= Nodales Channel =

Channel in British Columbia, Canada

- Nodales Channel
- Location: Discovery Islands, British Columbia, Canada
- Coordinates: 50°23′10″N 125°21′10″W
- Type: Strait

Nodales Channel is a channel along the coast of British Columbia, Canada. It is located between East Thurlow Island and Sonora Island, in the Discovery Islands archipelago between Vancouver Island and the mainland coast, north of the Salish Sea.

Nodales Channel connects to Cordero Channel and Frederick Arm, to the northeast, and to the junction of Discovery Passage and Johnstone Strait, to the southwest.

The channel features Hemming Bay on the northern East Thurlow Island side. Thurston Bay is on the southern Sonora Island side, near a cluster of bays, Binnington Bay, Handfield Bay, and Cameleon Harbour, in a small inlet connected to Nodales Channel by Burgess Passage and Young Passage.

Thurston Bay Marine Park is located on Davis Point, between Thurston Bay and Nodales Channel.
