= Comox-Strathcona Regional District =

Regional district of British Columbia, Canada

Coordinates: 50°20′00″N 125°20′00″W

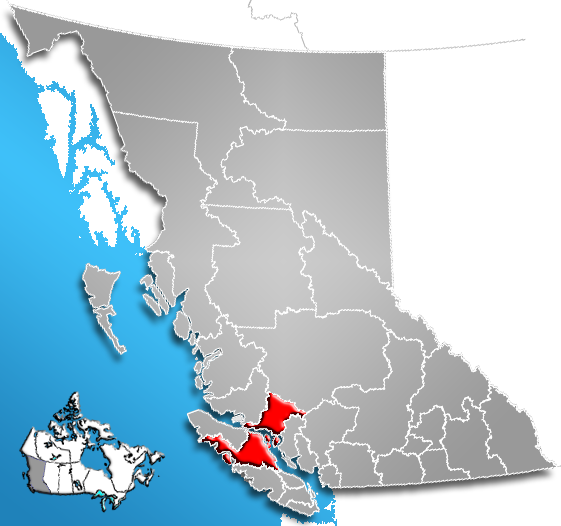

The Regional District of Comox-Strathcona was a regional district of British Columbia, Canada, from 1967 to 2008. On February 15, 2008, the regional district was abolished and replaced by two successor regional districts, Comox Valley and Strathcona.

The district covered large portions of northern Vancouver Island and included part of the mainland north of the Sunshine Coast. As of the 2006 census, the Regional District had a population of 101,595. The district's administrative offices were located in Courtenay, although the most populous incorporated community was the District Municipality of Campbell River.

== Geography ==
The Vancouver Island part of the Comox Strathcona Regional District stretches all the way across the island from east to west, and north to south between Sayward and the Denman and Hornby Islands on its east coast, and between Nootka Island and the Brooks Peninsula on its west coast, including most of Strathcona Provincial Park. The mainland portion, which is only very lightly settled, begins in the southeast at Toba Inlet, and stretches northwest almost to the Knight Inlet and also encompasses the Discovery Islands. The total land area is 20,013.48 km^{2} (7,728.01 sq mi).

Comox-Strathcona was bordered to the northwest by the Mount Waddington Regional District, to the east by the Powell River Regional District, and to the south by the Alberni-Clayoquot and Nanaimo Regional Districts.

== History ==
In 2007, Ida Chong, BC Minister of Community Services, announced that it was to be split into two districts, one covering the Comox Valley (electoral areas A, B, C and K), the other covering the rest of the existing district. The announcement came as something of a surprise to the existing regional council, and was opposed by some, particularly those directors representing rural areas.

== Communities ==
=== Incorporated communities ===
- Campbell River
- Comox
- Courtenay
- Cumberland
- Gold River
- Sayward
- Tahsis
- Zeballos

== Electoral areas ==
=== A (Baynes Sound) ===
- Fanny Bay
- Royston
- Union Bay

=== B (Comox North) ===
- Lazo
- Little River
- Tsolum

=== C (Puntledge/Black Creek) ===
- Black Creek
- Merville
- Oyster River
- Saratoga Beach

=== D (Oyster Bay/Buttle Lake) ===
- Campbell River Area

=== G (Kyuquot/Nootka) ===
- Kyuquot and Fair Harbour
- Oclucje
- Ehatis
- Esperanza and CeePeeCee
- Queens Cove
- Nuchatlitz
- Port Eliza
- Yuquot (Friendly Cove)
- Nootka Village
- Kendrick Arm and Plumper Harbour
- Tsaxana

=== I (Cortes Island) ===
- Cortes Island

=== J (Quadra Island and the Discovery Islands) ===
- Hardwick Island
- Port Neville
- Quadra Island
- Read Island
- Redonda Islands
- Refuge Cove
- Thurlow Islands

=== K (Denman/Hornby Islands) ===
See Islands Trust.
