= Hernando Island =

Island in British Columbia, Canada

- Location of Hernando Island (bottom right)

Geography
- Location: Salish Sea
- Coordinates: 49°58′58″N 124°55′08″W
- Archipelago: Discovery Islands
- Total islands: 1
- Area: 11 km^{2} (4.2 sq mi)
- Length: 5.2 km (3.23 mi)
- Width: 3.6 km (2.24 mi)
- Coastline: 21 km (13 mi)
- Highest elevation: 85 m (279 ft)

Administration
- Canada
- Province: British Columbia
- Region: Sunshine Coast
- Regional district: qathet

Hernando Island is one of the Discovery Islands on the coast of British Columbia, Canada. The isle is in the Salish Sea between Campbell River and Powell River.

== Natural features ==
The land area is 11 square kilometres (2,710 acres) and coastline is 21 kilometres (13 mi). The island has a temperate oceanic climate. The maximum elevation is 85 metres (279 ft) and mean elevation is 51 metres (167 ft). The 92 per cent tree coverage is primarily pine and fir.

In the 1890s, Stag Bay was the only good anchorage, being a sandy section along the rocky shore.

== First Nations and explorers ==
The traditional territory of the Tla'amin Nation (formerly called Sliammon) includes the smaller off-shore islands such as Hernando. Underground houses for fortification have been unearthed on the island. Along with the nearby Cortes Island, it was named in 1792 by Valdés and Galiano after Hernán Cortés, the Spanish conqueror of Mexico. Although the Spanish never settled the area, these names remained.

== Logging and farming ==
Non-native settlers farmed and logged from the 1880s, but most had moved on by the early 1900s. By 1915, Michael Manson had extensive landholdings, and the family managed the Campbell River Lumber Co. operations on the island. In 1912, Locomotive #2, a Shay, was bought from the bankruptcy trustee of the Lenora Mt. Sicker Railway (LMSR), and run first at Campbell River, then on Hernando Island. Assumedly, the Shay retained the 0.9-metre (3 ft) gauge of the LMSR. The narrow gauge logging railway transported logs across the island to the Stag Bay pier for dumping into the ocean and towing to a mill. Operating until 1920, the locomotive was wrecked and scrapped. After logging ceased about this time, some family members remained as farmers.

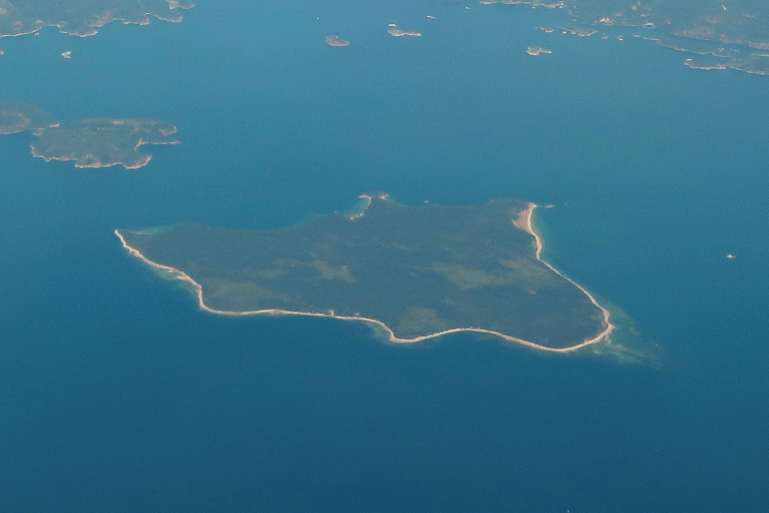
Northeastward view of Hernando Island, 2018

== Community ==
During 1893–1899, the post office operated and the school was open.

In 1962, Prince Wilhelm zu Wied of Koblenz on the Rhine paid $80,000 for the island. but sold it to a syndicate in 1972. The ownership company was bought by 50 shareholders in 1975.

The property title for owners is represented by shares in the co-operative. A specific lot is attached to each of the 52 shares. The island has a resident caretaker, dock, helipad, community garden, and tennis and basketball courts.

== Transportation ==
A weekly steamboat service commencing in the early 1890s lasted until around 1910.

During 1895, the 203-metre (665 ft) government wharf was built. When beyond repair, this wharf at Stag Bay was replaced in 1903 by a floating 137-metre (450 ft) one.

Nowadays, scheduled summer services for passengers and freight from Campbell River are provided by Way West Water Taxis and Discovery Launch Water Taxi. CorilAir operates floatplanes.

== Nearby islands ==
Due north are Cortes Island and Twin Islands. Southwest is Mitlenatch Island. Southeast is Savary Island.
