= Rock Bay Marine Provincial Park =

Provincial park in British Columbia, Canada

- IUCN category II (national park)
- Location within Vancouver Island Location within British Columbia
- Interactive map of Rock Bay Marine Provincial Park
- Location: British Columbia, Canada
- Nearest city: Campbell River
- Coordinates: 50°19′59″N 125°27′30″W
- Area: 5.25 km^{2} (2.03 sq mi)
- Established: July 13, 1995
- Governing body: BC Parks

Rock Bay Marine Provincial Park is a provincial park in British Columbia, Canada, located on the Inside Passage at the junction of Johnstone Strait and Discovery Passage. The park contains approximately 525 ha. Rock Bay is located on the shore of Vancouver Island, immediately south of East Thurlow Island.

== See also ==
- Rock Bay, British Columbia (community)
