= Cordero Channel =

- French: Canal Cordero
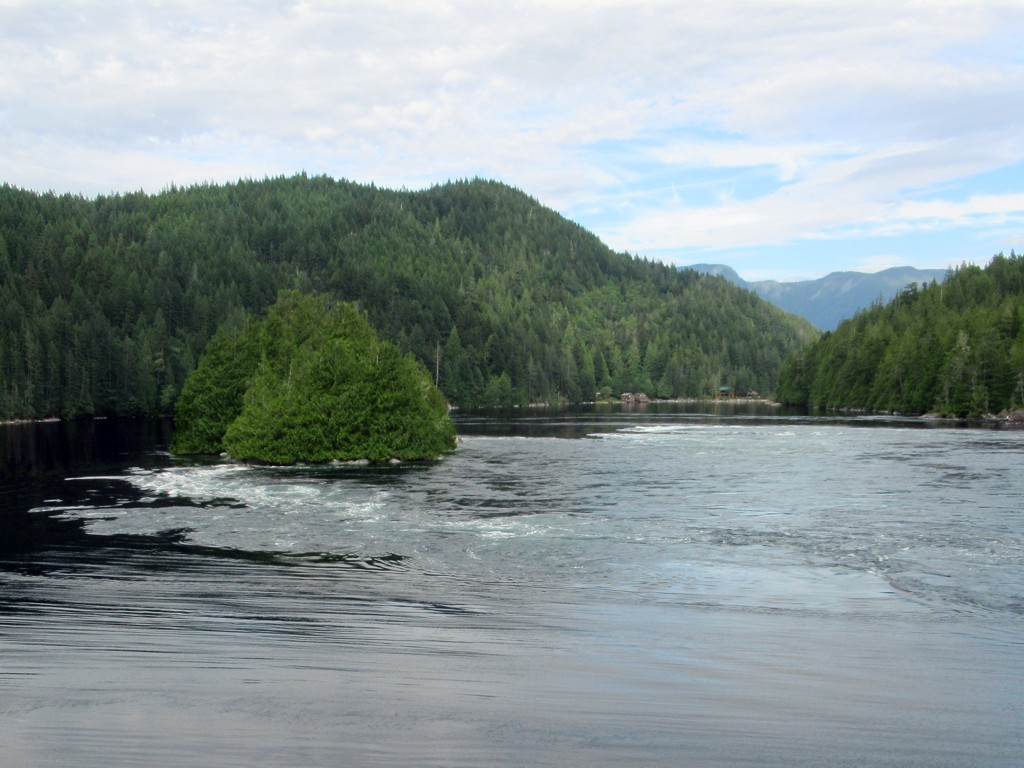
- Dent Rapids, which flows east to west between the mainland coast and Sonora Island

- Location within British Columbia

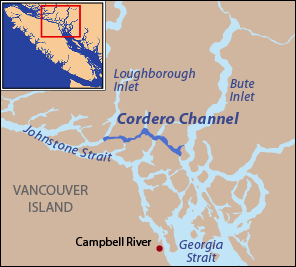
- Cordero Channel is part of a series of straits connecting the Strait of Georgia and Johnstone Strait
- Location: Strathcona RD, British Columbia
- Coordinates: 50°26′N 125°33′W
- Type: Strait
- Primary inflows: Bute Inlet
- Primary outflows: Loughborough Inlet

Cordero Channel is a strait in British Columbia, Canada, located between the mainland and Vancouver Island, among the Discovery Islands north of the Strait of Georgia. Cordero Channel runs north of Sonora Island, East Thurlow Island, and part of West Thurlow Island. Its eastern end connects to the mouth of Bute Inlet and to Calm Channel, at Stuart Island. Its west end is marked by the mouth of Loughborough Inlet, beyond which the channel is called Chancellor Channel, which continues west to Johnstone Strait.

There are four tidal rapids along Cordero Channel. The first is either Yuculta Rapids or Arran Rapids, depending on whether the channel is entered on the north or west side of Stuart Island. The following rapids from east to west are Gillard Passage Rapids, Dent Rapids, and Greene Point Rapids.

Cordero Channel was named Canal de Cardero in 1792 during the Spanish expedition of Dionisio Alcalá Galiano and Cayetano Valdés y Flores, in honor of José Cardero (sometimes called Josef Cardero), the expedition's artist and draftsman. Cardero sailed on board Valdés's ship, the Mexicana. He had sailed with Alessandro Malaspina from Spain on board the corvette Descubierta, possibly as a servant. After one of the official artists left Malaspina's expedition in Peru, Cardero began regularly producing drawings and was confirmed as an artist of the expedition in Mexico, in 1791. Like Galiano and Valdés, who had also been part of the Malaspina expedition, Cardero was detached from Malaspina's main mission in order to explore the Strait of Georgia. After they returned to Mexico, Cardero assisted Galiano in preparing reports, maps, and engravings. The name Canal de Cardero changed over time to the present form, Cordero Channel, and expanded in geographic scope to include a larger area. The form "Cardero" survives in the name of Cardero Street in Vancouver's West End. There is also a small fishing lodge named Camp Cordero located at the North end of the Channel.

== History ==
The 1792 Spanish expedition of Galiano and Valdés used the term Canal de Cardero for only one part of today's Cordero Channel, that being the portion west of Phillips Arm. Their names for other parts of today's Cordero Channel include Canal de Remolinos (Yuculta Rapids), Angostura de los Commandantes (Arran Rapids), Canal de Carbajal (also Carvajal, north of Sonora Island), Canal del Engaño, and Canal de Olavide (both north of East Thurlow Island and east of Phillips Arm).

Near Arran Rapids, which today marks the eastern end of Cordero Channel, the Spanish found a large village whose inhabitants were friendly. They warned the Spanish not to proceed through Arran Rapids because of strong currents and whirlpools. When the tide slackened the Spanish ships as well as a number of indigenous canoes passed through, entering Cordero Channel (this section of which the Spanish called Canal de Carbajal). By use of signs the natives indicated that the channel led to the sea. After making this discovery the Spanish returned to their base of operations where they met with the British expedition of George Vancouver for the last time before rejoining at Nootka Sound. The Spanish told Vancouver of their discovery of a passage to the sea and their intention to follow it. Soon after, a British scouting boat returned, having found Johnstone Strait. The two expeditions parted ways shortly afterwards, on July 13, 1792, with the British sailing through Discovery Passage and Johnstone Strait, while the Spanish went via Cordero Channel, Chancellor Channel, and Wellbore Channel. According to Galiano's report, Vancouver considered Cordero Channel too dangerous for his ships.

From their anchorage between West Redonda Island and Cortes Island, the Spanish set sail for Cordero Channel on July 13, 1792. They sailed up Calm Channel and around the east side of Stuart Island before finally reaching Arran Rapids (Angostura de los Commandantes), the entrance of Cordero Channel, on July 18. They had difficulty entering and were set back several times. On July 19 they met another group of indigenous people who were catching large quantities of fish in the strait. With some guidance from the natives the Spanish came to better understand the nature of the currents and made a plan for passing through. When the tidal current slackened in the afternoon the Spanish ships entered, yet the current was still swift enough to render the ships incapable of steering. At one point Galiano's ship, the Sutil, was caught in a whirlpool, but managed to escape. In the late evening, somewhere near Dent Island, they anchored in a cove, which they gave the name Anclage del Refugio. They named the first part of Cordero Channel Angostura de Carvajal and Canal de Carvajal, in honor of Ciriaco Gonzales Carvajal, an auditor of the Spanish Navy in Mexico (who would preside over the audit of Galiano and Valdés's voyage upon their return).

The Spanish had difficulty passing Dent Rapids, finally managing to do so on July 23. They were again visited by indigenous canoes of the same natives they had met at Arran Rapids (whom they called the "good Indians"). The natives again provided guidance regarding the currents and suggested a route the Spanish ships should take. In addition the natives made maps for the Spanish, showing which channels were closed inlets and which were straits that led to the sea. The maps were made by placing books on a bed and pencils on a piece of paper.

Having reached the northern end of Nodales Channel between Sonora Island and East Thurlow Island, the Spanish decided to continue west along today's Cordero Channel. They called this section of the channel Canal del Engaño. They entered it on July 26 and made quick progress to another section of Cordero Channel they called Canal de Olavide. They were carried by the current into the section they called Canal de Cardero, unable to steer or make way with oars. At the end of the day they were able to anchor at the mouth of Loughborough Inlet (Canal de Salamanca).

The Spanish ships left their anchorage at Viana on July 27, 1792, and entered what is today called Chancellor Channel, thus leaving today's Cordero Channel. When they reached Hardwicke Island they turned to the northwest, leaving Chancellor Channel for Wellbore Channel (Canal de Nuevos Remolinos), which took them to Sunderland Channel and finally Johnstone Strait.
