= Stuart Island (British Columbia) =

Privately owned island of the Discovery Islands in British Columbia, Canada

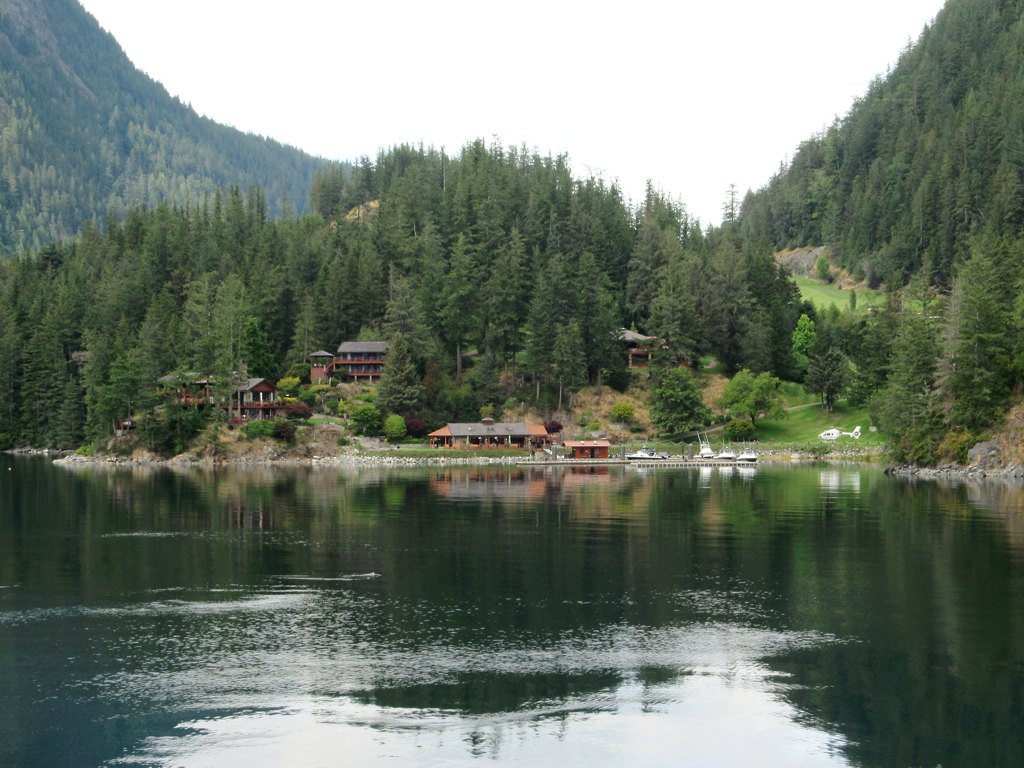
- Dennis Washington estate on Stuart Island

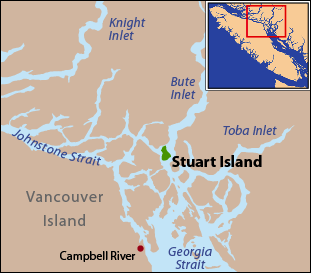
- Location of Stuart Island

Geography
- Location: Bute Inlet and Calm Channel
- Coordinates: 50°23′N 125°6.5′W
- Archipelago: Discovery Islands

Administration
- Canada
- Province: British Columbia
- Regional district: Strathcona

Stuart Island is one of the Discovery Islands of British Columbia, which lie between northern Vancouver Island and the British Columbia Coast. It is privately owned and has no ferry access. It is situated at the mouth of Bute Inlet to the east of the larger Sonora Island within Electoral Area C of the Strathcona Regional District. The island, and Bute Inlet, were named for John Stuart, 3rd Earl of Bute, Prime Minister of Great Britain from 1762 to 1763.

== Fishing lodges ==
The island is mostly home to exclusive fishing lodges and large private estates. Most of the visitors arrive by float plane or helicopter. Nanook Lodge is the only fishing/adventure lodge open to the public on Stuart Island and has scheduled daily seaplane service from Seattle.

== Property owners ==
Among the property owners on this island is Dennis Washington, a Montana businessman and owner of the Seaspan Marine Corporation, Dave Ritchie, a Vancouver businessman and Kris Mailman, owner and CEO of Seymour Pacific Developments and Broadstreet Properties. Washington has built a 9-hole golf course out of the granite on his estate.

== Airstrip ==
Stuart Island has a paved, private airstrip, approximately 2,100 ft (640 m) long. It does not appear on any aeronautical chart or in the Canada Flight Supplement. The Big Bay Water Aerodrome appears in the Water Aerodrome Supplement.

== See also ==
- Cordero Channel
