= Lewis Channel =

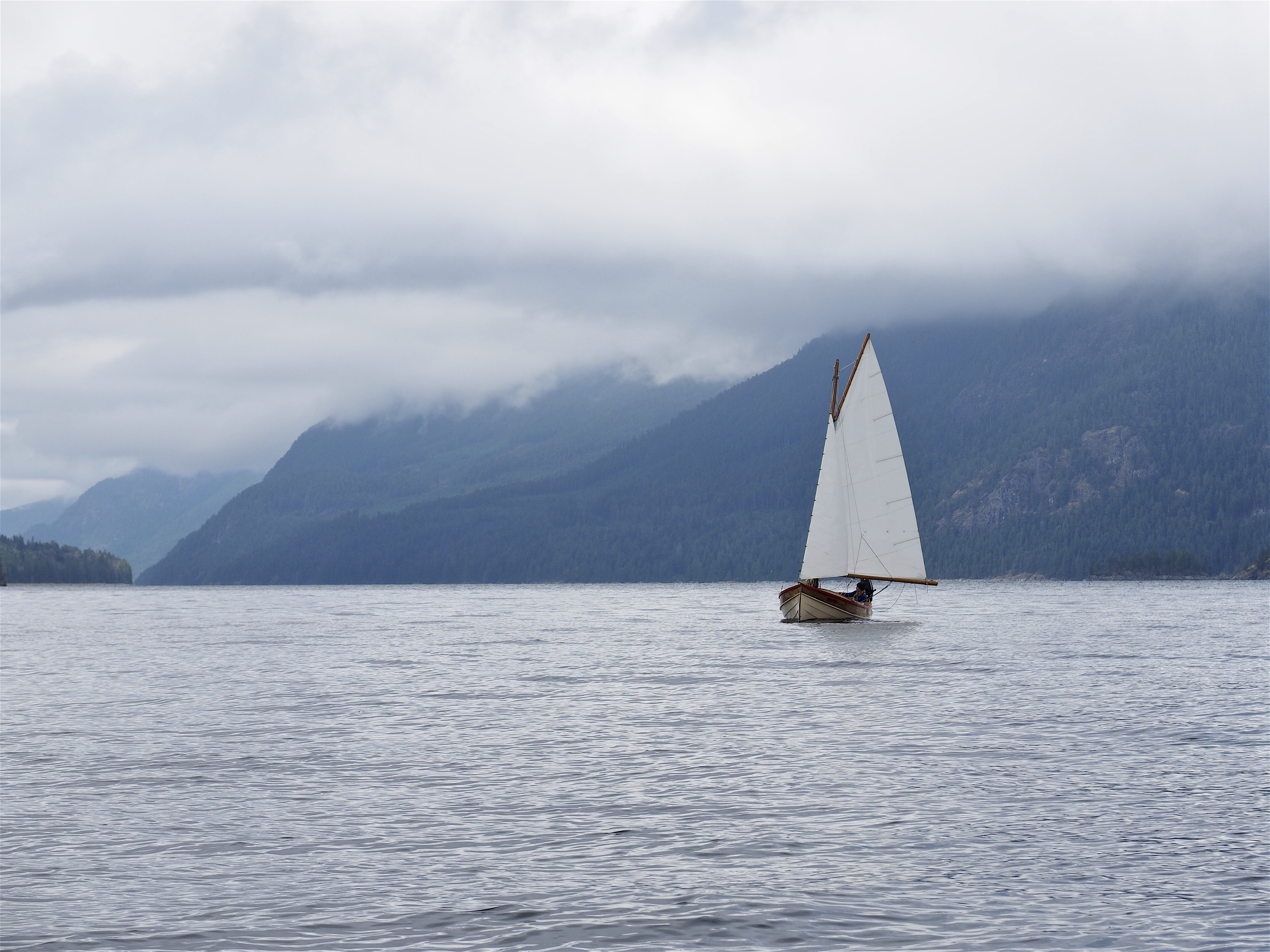
- Lewis Channel

- Location within British Columbia

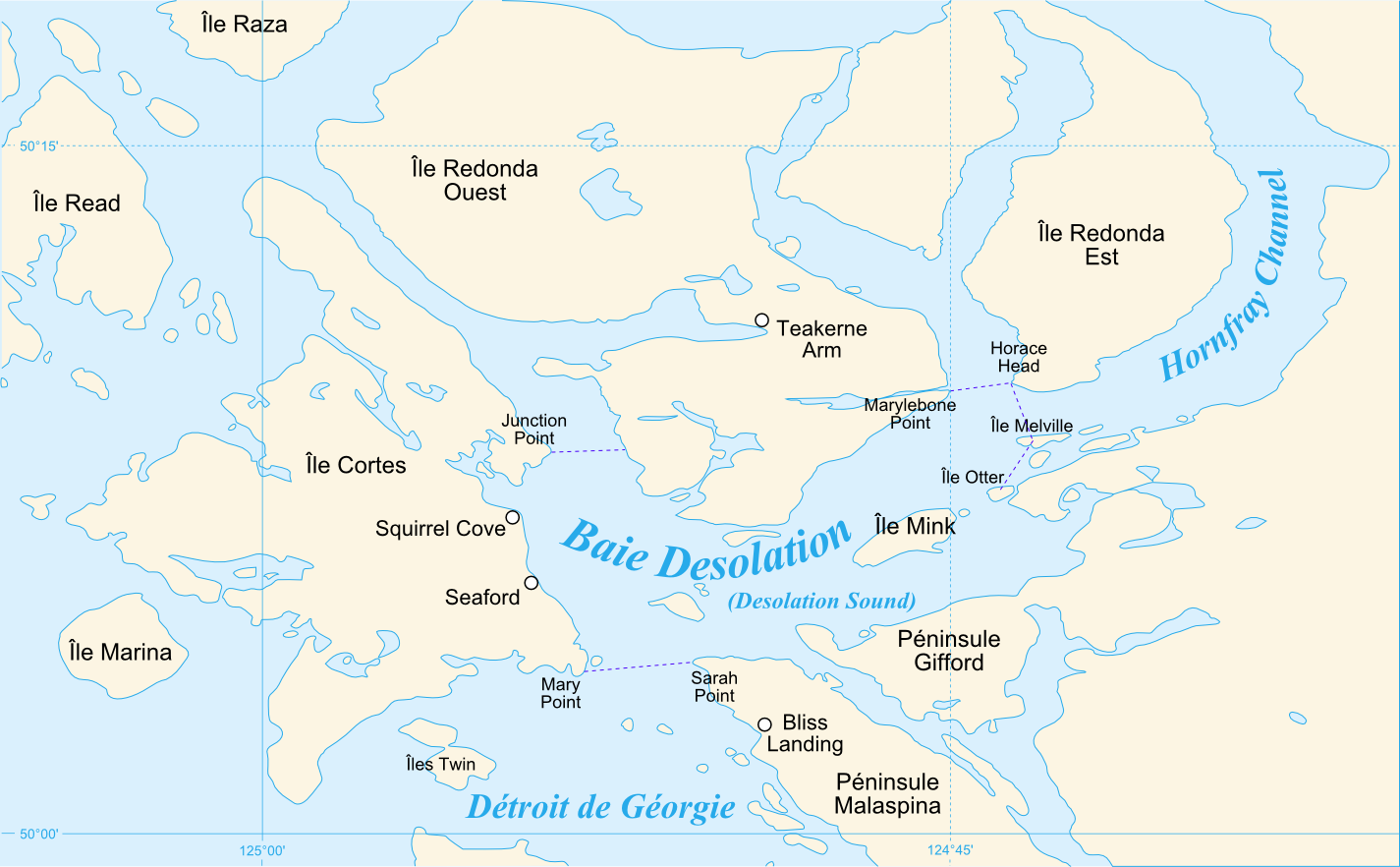
- Lewis Channel is located between Cortes Island and West Redonda Island
- Location: Discovery Islands, British Columbia
- Coordinates: 50°11′00″N 124°55′25″W
- Type: Strait
- Ocean/sea sources: Salish Sea

Lewis Channel is a strait located between Cortes Island and West Redonda Island in the Discovery Islands of British Columbia, Canada. It is part of the northern Salish Sea.

== Geography ==
Lewis Channel connects Desolation Sound to the south with Calm Channel and Deer Channel to the north. Teakerne Arm branches off of the main channel to the east and forms a large protected bay within West Redonda Island. The channel itself contains no major islands.

=== Hydrology ===
The northern hydrological limit of Lewis Channel delineates part of the northern limit of the Salish Sea.

== See also ==
- Sutil Channel
- Waddington Channel
- Homfray Channel
