= Hardwicke Island =

Island in British Columbia, Canada

- Location of Hardwicke Island (centre left)

Geography
- Location: Johnstone Strait
- Coordinates: 50°26′31″N 125°50′46″W
- Archipelago: Discovery Islands
- Area: 78 km^{2} (30 sq mi)

Administration
- Canada
- Province: British Columbia
- Regional district: Strathcona

Hardwicke Island is an island in British Columbia, Canada, measuring approximately 78 square kilometres (30 sq mi).

== Geography ==
Hardwicke Island lies directly off the coast of the village of Sayward and to the west of its neighbour West Thurlow Island. Hardwicke Island is located within Electoral Area C of the Strathcona Regional District.

Hardwicke Island is closely connected to the Bendickson, a Norwegian family who began logging operations on the island beginning in 1918, and who continued thereafter to live on or visit the island while growing fruit and vegetables there. Today, the island is base to the Hardwicke Transportation company which provides water taxi and small freight shipping services around the region.

== History ==
The island was named after Philip Yorke, 3rd Earl of Hardwicke, a patron of the master's mate on HMS Discovery during the 18th century Vancouver Expedition. The island is part of the Discovery Islands archipelago, named after the Discovery Passage, explored by Captain George Vancouver on the Discovery and so-named (the passage) by Captain Henry Kellett in 1847, to honour Captain Vancouver.
