= Twin Islands (British Columbia) =

Island group in British Columbia, Canada

- Location of Twin Islands (bottom right)

Geography
- Location: Salish Sea
- Coordinates: 50°01′45″N 124°55′52″W
- Archipelago: Discovery Islands

Administration
- Canada
- Province: British Columbia
- Regional district: Strathcona

Twin Islands, formerly known as the Ulloa Islands, are two small islands southeast of Cortes Island, between the eastern coast of Vancouver Island and the mainland of British Columbia, Canada and are part of the Discovery Islands. The southern island is about 1.5 kilometres (0.9 miles) in diameter and is separated from the slightly smaller northern island by a channel only about 60 metres (197 feet) wide. The north island is somewhat less rocky and more forested than the south island. They are located within Electoral Area B of the Strathcona Regional District.

Maximilian, Margrave of Baden of Baden-Baden, Germany purchased Twin Islands in the late 1950s as a summer retreat for his family.

On August 13, 1994, Queen Elizabeth II spent a few days on a private retreat at Twin Island while Prince Philip visited Yellowknife, Northwest Territories, Iqaluit and Rankin Inlet, Nunavut.
