= West Thurlow Island =

Island in British Columbia, Canada

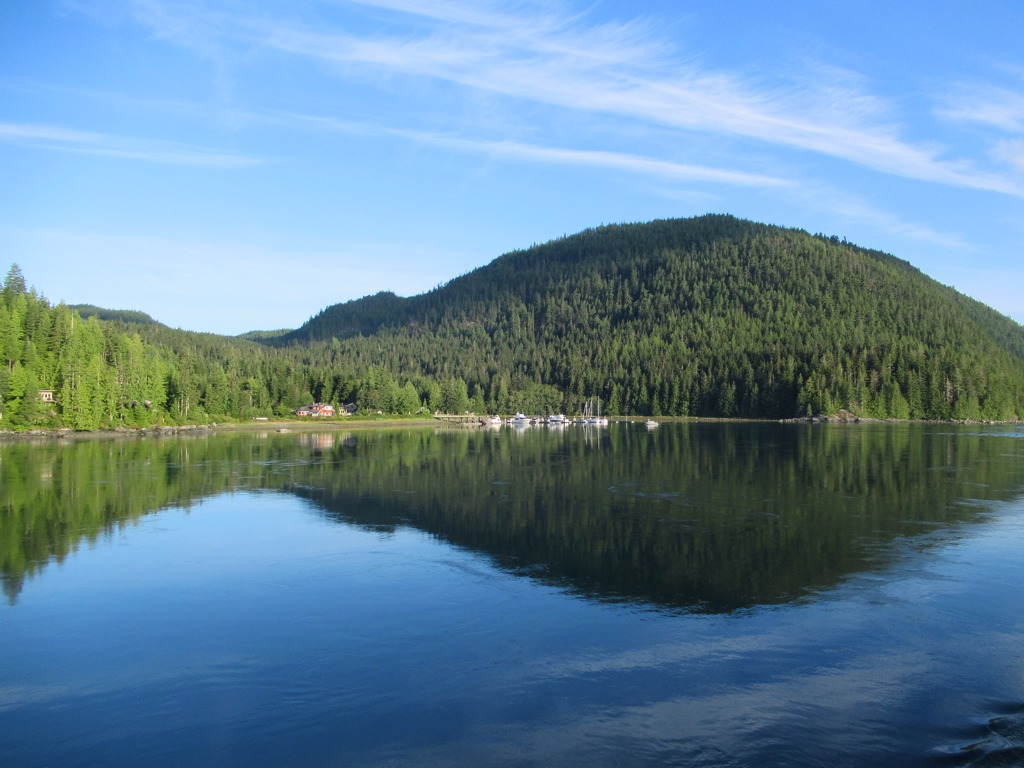
- West Thurlow as viewed from Blind Channel

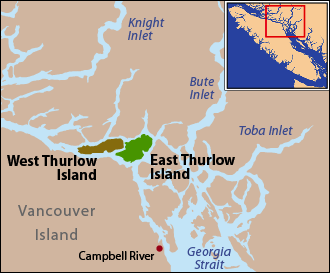
- East and West Thurlow islands are located along Johnstone Strait

Geography
- Coordinates: 50.405°N 125.616°W
- Archipelago: Discovery Islands

Administration
- Canada
- Province: British Columbia
- Regional district: Strathcona

West Thurlow Island is an island in British Columbia, Canada. It is part of the Discovery Islands, an archipelago between Vancouver Island and the mainland, whose waters connect the Strait of Georgia with the Johnstone Strait and the Queen Charlotte Strait.

West Thurlow lies in the traditional territory of the Kwakwaka'wakw first nations.

== Etymology ==
The island was named for Edward Thurlow, 1st Baron Thurlow, Lord Chancellor of England, by Captain George Vancouver during his voyage through the Johnstone Strait in July 1792.

== Geography ==
West Thurlow Island is located north of Vancouver Island, south of the mainland, southeast of Hardwicke Island, and west of East Thurlow Island, separated from the latter by Blind Channel. It is located within Electoral Area C of the Strathcona Regional District.

Just north of West Thurlow Island Loughborough Inlet extends into the mainland. The strait that separates the island from the mainland is called Cordero Channel to the east of the mouth of Loughborough Inlet, and Chancellor Channel to the west. Chancellor Channel also separates. Beauty Cat Strait separates West Thurlow Island from Vancouver Island.

There are a handful of private landholdings on the eastern shore of the island. The majority are located adjacent to Blind Channel Resort, which includes a marina, marine refueling station, general store, post office and seasonal restaurant and accommodations.

== Forestry ==
Logging operations first began on the island with the establishment of the Thurlow Island Lumber Company sawmill in 1918 in the location of what is now the Blind Channel Resort. Settlements around the mill eventually peaked at a population of several hundred in the 1940s, though no permanent forestry camps now remain on the island. West Thurlow currently includes sections of two tree farm licenses, 45 and 47, held by International Forest Products Ltd. (Interfor) and Timberwest respectively. The areas are accessible by two dry-land timber sorts at Knox Bay and Butterfly Bay, both on the southern shore of the island. West Thurlow Island lies within the Coastal Western Hemlock biogeoclimatic zone, and its forests consists mostly of western hemlock, Douglas fir and western red cedar.
