= East Thurlow Island =

Island in British Columbia, Canada

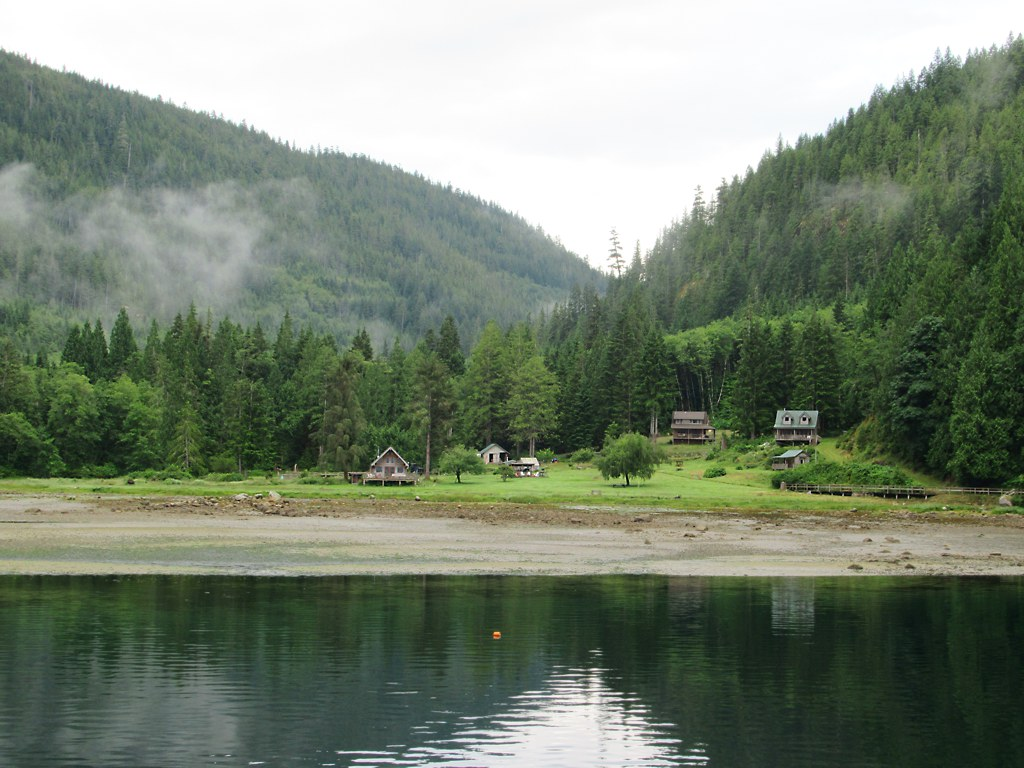
- Shoal Bay cabins on East Thurlow Island

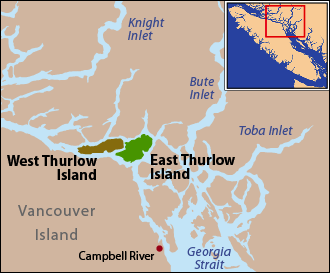
- East and West Thurlow Islands are located on Johnstone Strait just north of Discovery Passage.

Geography
- Coordinates: 50.407°N 125.429°W
- Archipelago: Discovery Islands

Administration
- Canada
- Province: British Columbia
- Regional district: Strathcona

East Thurlow Island is an island in British Columbia, Canada.

== Geography ==
It is part of the Discovery Islands, an archipelago between Vancouver Island and the mainland, whose waters connect the Strait of Georgia with the Johnstone Strait and the Queen Charlotte Strait. East Thurlow Island is located north of Vancouver Island, south of the mainland, northwest of Sonora Island, and east of West Thurlow Island.

East Thurlow Island is separated from the mainland by Cordero Channel, from Vancouver Island by the Johnstone Strait, and from Sonora Island by Nodales Channel. East and West Thurlow Islands are separated by the Mayne Passage. The junction of the Johnstone Strait and the Discovery Passage lies just south of East Thurlow Island.

== Administration ==
East Thurlow Island is located within Electoral Area C of the Strathcona Regional District.

== History ==
The island received its name in 1792, after Edward Thurlow, 1st Baron Thurlow, Lord Chancellor of England. It was later discovered that Thurlow consists of two islands, and the narrow passage between them was given the name Blind Channel, perhaps because its discoverer, Captain Vancouver, had missed it. The channel was later renamed Mayne Passage, but the community that formed on the east end of West Thurlow Island stuck with the name Blind Channel.

By 1910, Thurlow Island Lumber Company sawmill was established at Blind Channel. The B. C. Directory lists nine lumbermen, six woodsmen, a blacksmith, and the mill manager. Notches in the sides of scattered stumps are signs of the labouring woodsmen with bucksaws, and the wide shoes of workhorses attest to the method of delivery to the mill. By 1918, the population had grown to 120, with Union Steam Ship freight and passenger boats visiting regularly. For the next few decades the area bustled with activity. Blind Channel was home to a cannery, a shingle mill, and two large dance halls. The area continued to attract people looking for opportunity and an independent way of life.

In the 1930s, nine bootleggers were competing in Blind Channel at one point, mostly providing their own distillations with a high alcohol content. For those who preferred the taste and guaranteed safety of the approved product, two of them specialized in government liquor. The population peaked in the 1940s.
