= PRRD =

PRRD can stand for:

- Peace River Regional District, a regional government in British Columbia, Canada
- Powell River Regional District, a regional government in British Columbia, Canada
- President Rodrigo Roa Duterte, Filipino lawyer, politician, and 16th President of the Philippines
