= Teakerne Arm Provincial Park =

Provincial park in British Columbia, Canada

- IUCN category III (natural monument or feature)
- Location within Vancouver Island Location within British Columbia
- Interactive map of Teakerne Arm Provincial Park
- Coordinates: 50°12′05″N 124°50′35″W
- Area: 128 ha (320 acres)
- Established: August 10, 1989

Teakerne Arm Provincial Park is a provincial park in British Columbia, Canada, located on the north shore of Teakerne Arm on West Redonda Island in the Discovery Islands archipelago, to the northeast of the city of Campbell River, Canada.
