= Smelt Bay Provincial Park =

Provincial park in British Columbia, Canada

- IUCN category II (national park)
- Location within Vancouver Island Location within British Columbia
- Interactive map of Smelt Bay Provincial Park
- Location: British Columbia, Canada
- Nearest city: Campbell River
- Coordinates: 50°01′56″N 124°59′39″W
- Area: 0.2 km^{2} (0.077 sq mi)
- Established: February 1, 1973
- Governing body: BC Parks

Smelt Bay Provincial Park is a provincial park in British Columbia, Canada. It is located at the south end of Cortes Island, and has twenty-two camping sites. Eight are reservable and the rest are first-come, first-served. There is also an overflow parking lot directly next to the beach for any excess campers.
