= Thurston Bay Marine Provincial Park =

Provincial park in British Columbia, Canada

- IUCN category II (national park)
- Location within Vancouver Island Location within British Columbia
- Interactive map of Thurston Bay Marine Provincial Park
- Location: British Columbia, Canada
- Nearest city: Campbell River
- Coordinates: 50°22′24″N 125°19′39″W
- Area: 5.31 km^{2} (2.05 sq mi)
- Established: April 23, 1970
- Governing body: BC Parks

Thurston Bay Marine Provincial Park is a provincial park on the northwest side of Sonora Island in British Columbia, Canada.
