= Quathiaski Cove =

Coordinates: 50.051°N 125.217°W

Location of Quathiaski Cove in British Columbia

Quathiaski Cove is a settlement on Quadra Island in British Columbia. It is located within Electoral Area C of the Strathcona Regional District.

Quathiaski Cove is the commercial hub of Quadra Island and point of arrival for the regular BC Ferries service between Campbell River on Vancouver Island and Quadra Island.

At the turn of the century, Quathiaski Cove flourished as the economic centre for the Quadra and Campbell River area. Businesses, mail and settlers arrived first to Quathiaski cove, and then travelled to Campbell River, or other neighbouring Islands. Fishing and logging were the primary industries. Today these industries have been replaced primarily by tourism. The settlement offers visitors key services including, groceries, liquor, post office, gas and propane.
