= West Redonda Island =

Island in British Columbia, Canada

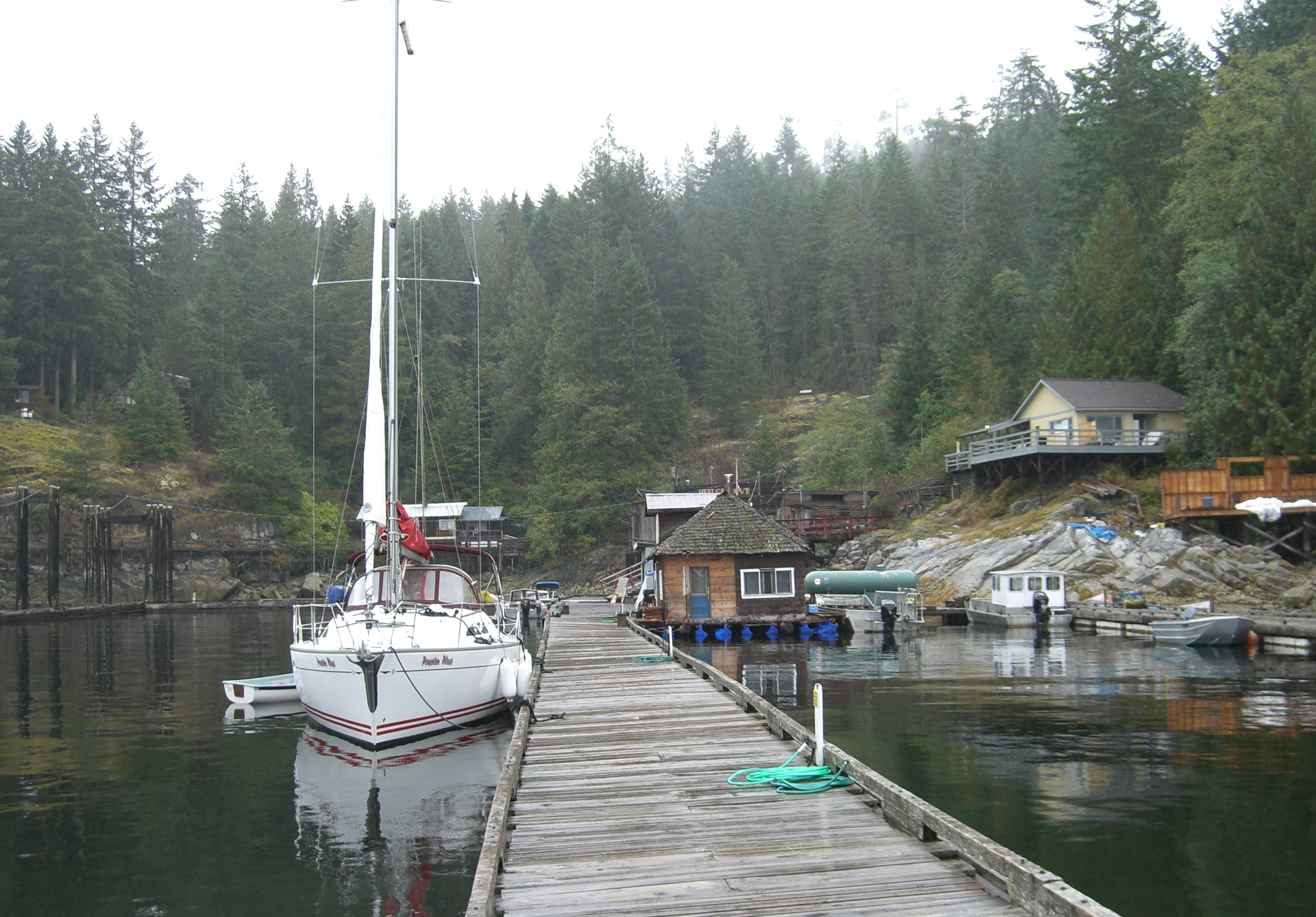
- Refuge Cove

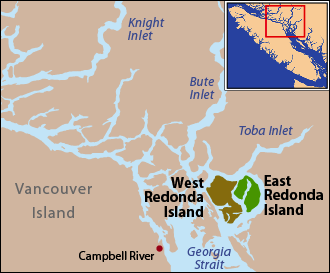
- East and West Redonda Islands are located just north of Desolation Sound, near the mouth of Toba Inlet.

Geography
- Location: Salish Sea
- Coordinates: 50°12′56″N 124°51′35″W
- Archipelago: Discovery Islands

Administration
- Canada
- Province: British Columbia
- Regional district: Strathcona

West Redonda Island is an island in British Columbia, Canada. It is part of the Discovery Islands, an archipelago between Vancouver Island and the mainland, and between the Strait of Georgia and Johnstone Strait.

West Redonda Island is located west of East Redonda Island, northeast of Cortes Island, southeast of Raza Island, and south of the mainland between Toba Inlet and Bute Inlet within Electoral Area C of the Strathcona Regional District.

The island is separated from the smaller East Redonda Island by Waddington Channel, from Cortes Island by Lewis Channel, from Raza Island by Deer Passage, and from the mainland by Pryce Channel. Desolation Sound lies just south of West Redonda Island.

The west side of the island is indented by Teakerne Arm, an inlet off Lewis Channel. 50.12392°N 124.8401°W at the south end of West Redonda Island Both Redonda Islands were sighted in 1792 by the Spanish explorers Galiano and Valdés and given the name Isla Redonda, meaning "round". The ships of Galiano and Valdés spent several days anchored near the two ships under George Vancouver in Lewis Channel and Teakerne Arm off the west coast of West Redonda Island. From this base the two expeditions sent out boat parties to explore the many islands and channels in the area, sharing their findings with one another.
