= Mitlenatch Island Nature Provincial Park =

Provincial park in British Columbia, Canada

- IUCN category Ia (strict nature reserve)
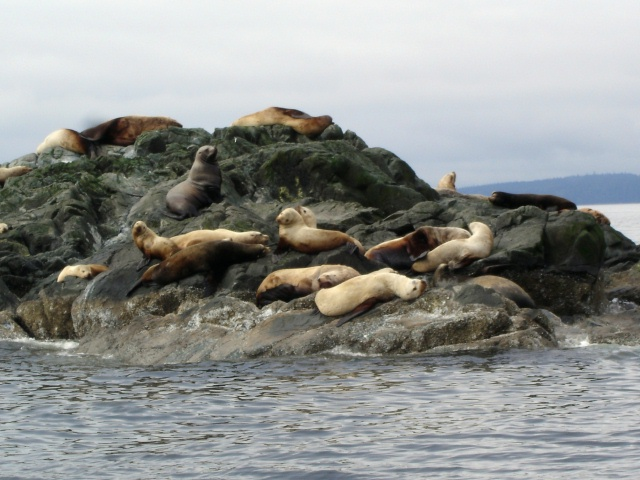
- Sea lions on Mitlenatch Island

- Location within Vancouver Island Location within British Columbia
- Interactive map of Mitlenatch Island; Nature Provincial Park
- Location: British Columbia, Canada
- Coordinates: 49°57′N 125°00′W
- Area: 155 ha (380 acres)
- Established: July 14, 1961
- Website: bcparks.ca/mitlenatch-island-nature-park/

Mitlenatch Island Nature Provincial Park is a provincial park in British Columbia, Canada encompassing Mitlenatch Island, a small islet in the northern Strait of Georgia within the Strathcona Regional District.

Mitlenatch Island is located approximately 30 kilometres (19 mi) northeast of Courtenay, British Columbia in the Strait of Georgia. The protected area is 155 hectares (380 acres) in size, with 36 hectares (89 acres) being upland and 119 hectares (290 acres) foreshore area.

== History ==
In 1959, the province of British Columbia purchased Mitlenatch Island from a local family, and in 1961 it was designated as a Provincial Nature Park.

"Mitlenatch" is a Coast Salish First Nations word translated to mean "calm waters all around". Perhaps the most descriptive meaning comes from the Comox language where ‘metl’ meant calm and ‘nach’ meant posterior. Calm (waters) behind is an apt description of the island during stormy weather. In the Kwak'wala language of the Kwakwaka'wakw, ‘mah-kwee-lay-lah’ meant "it looks close, but seems to move away as you approach it".

== Conservation ==
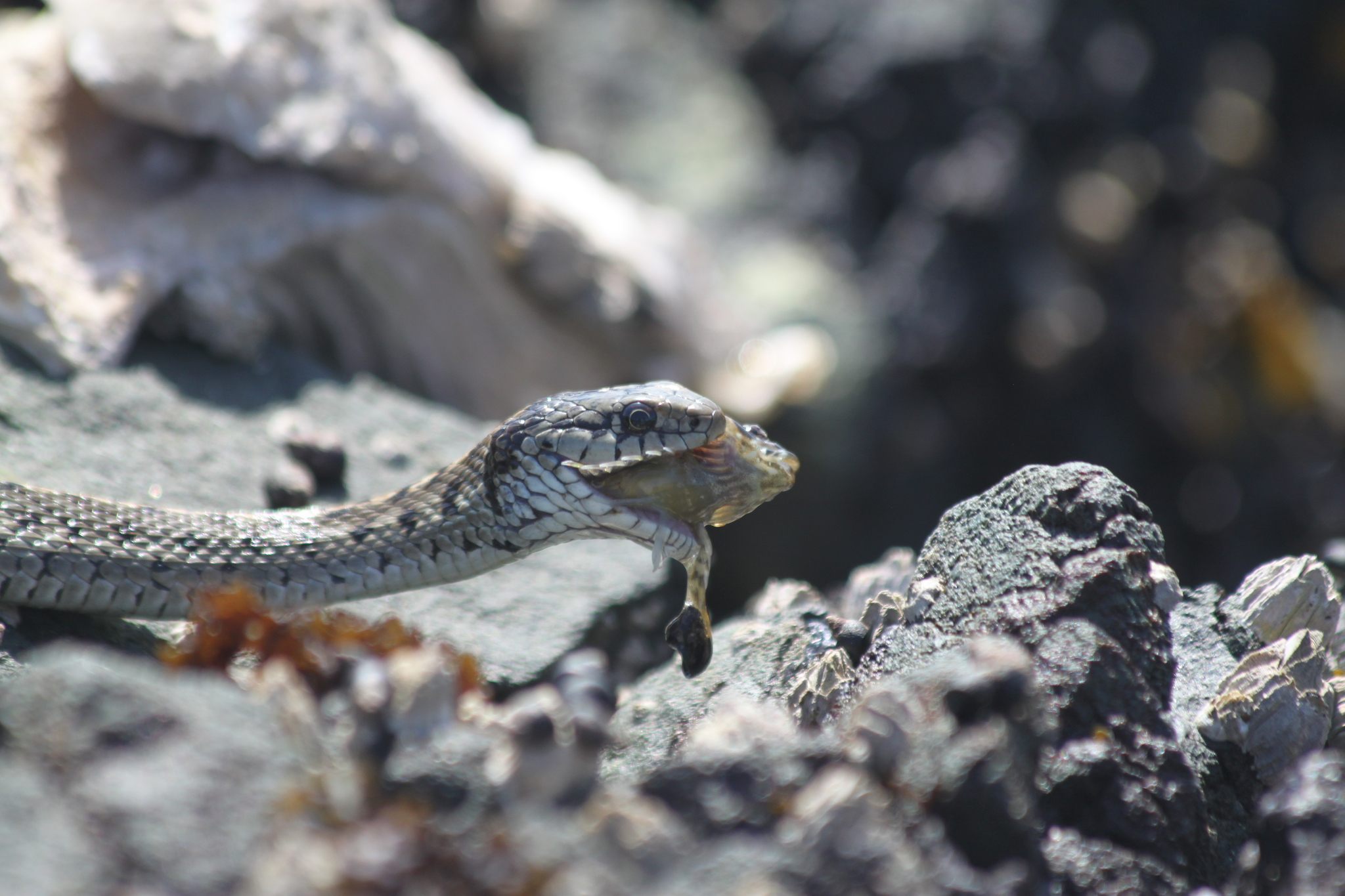
Wandering gartersnake (Thamnophis elegans vagrans) eating a fish

Mitlenatch Island Nature Provincial Park is home to the largest seabird colony in the Strait of Georgia. Glaucous-winged gulls, pelagic cormorants, pigeon guillemots, rhinoceros auklets and black oystercatchers also return to Mitlenatch each spring to breed. All sedentary marine life, including abalones, scallops and sea cucumbers are fully protected within this zone. Some of the largest garter snakes in BC reside here. These snakes are frequently encountered along trails and in beach and tide pool areas, where they feed on small fish such as sculpins and blennies. This park is a favourite haul-out for harbour seals, northern and California sea lions. The sea lions are generally present from late autumn to mid-May. River otters, killer whales and harbour porpoises are often sighted offshore.

== Recreation ==
Mitlenatch Island is only accessible by boat, with opportunities for canoeing, kayaking and nature-watching. Due to the sensitive bird habitat, most of the island is closed to the public. A short trail from Camp Bay to Northwest Bay, and to East Hill gull blind are the only areas accessible to visitors.

== See also ==
- List of British Columbia Provincial Parks
- List of Canadian provincial parks
