= Sonora Island =

Island in British Columbia, Canada

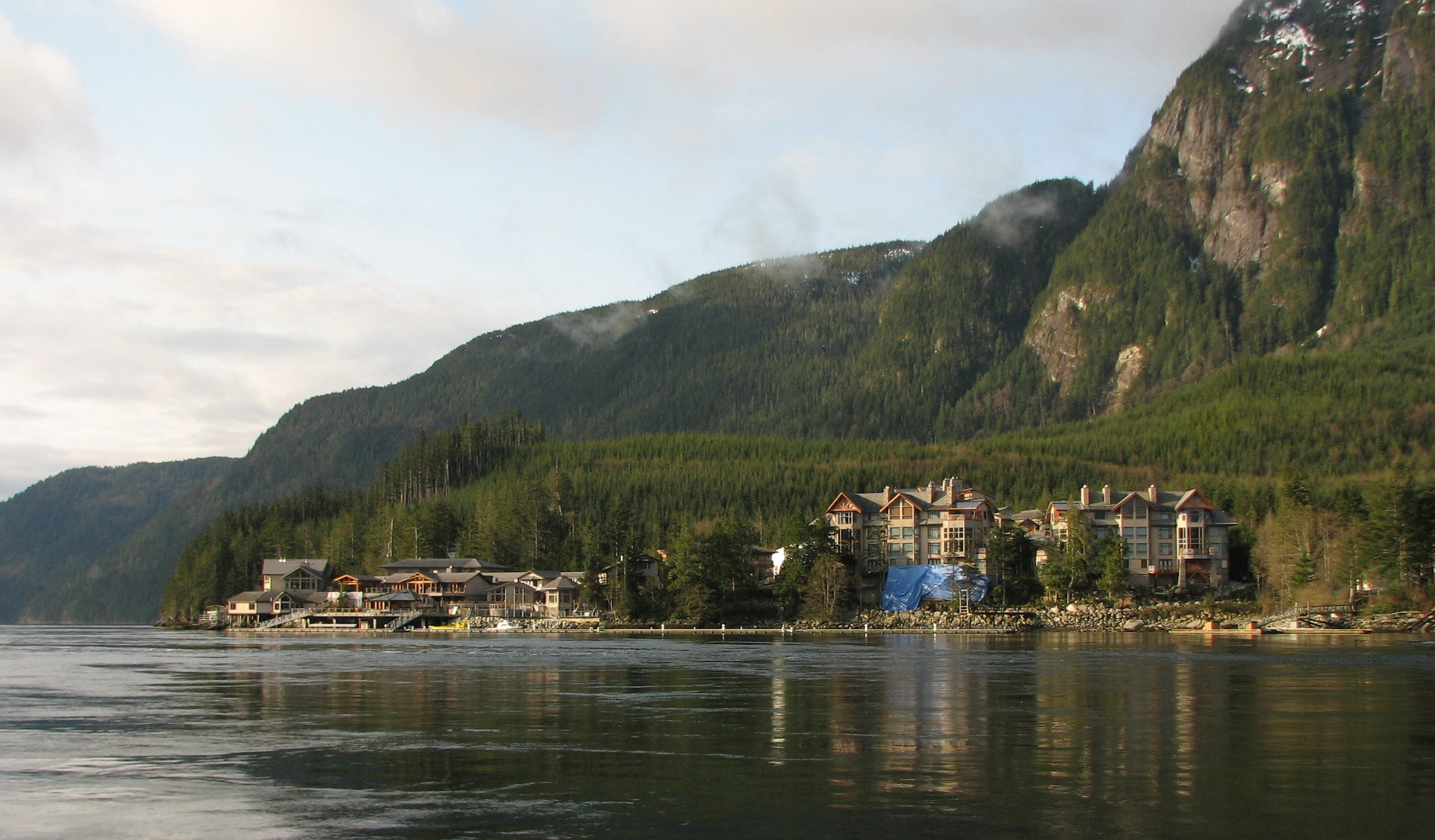
- Sonora Island and the Sonora Island Resort

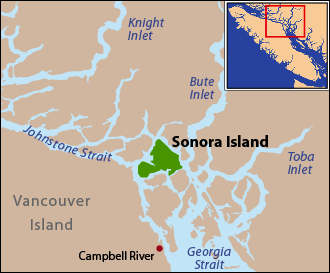
- Location of Sonora Island

Geography
- Coordinates: 50°22′33″N 125°15′5″W
- Archipelago: Discovery Islands

Administration
- Canada
- Province: British Columbia
- Regional district: Strathcona

Sonora Island is one of the outer islands (without ferry service) of the Discovery Islands of British Columbia, Canada. It is at the eastern end of the Johnstone Strait and the northern end of the Discovery Passage within Electoral Area C of the Strathcona Regional District.

The island took its name from the 36 ft (10.97 m) Spanish schooner that explored the Pacific Northwest in 1775. The expedition consisted of two ships: the Santiago, commanded by Bruno de Heceta and the schooner Sonora (la Señora), commanded by his second in command, Lieutenant Juan Francisco de la Bodega y Quadra. After some loss of life, Hezeta decided to return to Mexico, but Bodega y Quadra refused to follow him without having completed the essential mission, which was to locate the Russians. He continued northward on the Sonora and got as far as what is now close to Sitka, Alaska, reaching 59° north latitude on 15 August 1775. Failing to find any Russians, he returned southward. When returning he made sure that he landed once to claim the coast for Spain. This expedition made it clear to the Spanish that the Russians did not have a large presence in the Pacific Northwest. The vessel, its full name Nuestra Señora de Guadalupe (generally known as the Señora) with a crew of 16 was intended to perform coastal reconnaissance and mapping, and could make landfall in places the larger Santiago was unable to approach on its previous voyage; in this way, the expedition could officially lay claim to the lands north of Mexico it visited.

The island includes Thurston Bay Marine Provincial Park on the west side of the island (accessible only by sea) and a resort on the east side of the island.

The island is the location of the Sonora Resort, and Cathers Cove: the only rentals on the island.

A narrow passage between Sonora and the Maurelle Islands, Hole in the Wall, is the site of extremely powerful tidal currents and whirlpools.

Discovery Mountain, on the western part of Sonora Island, has a Canadian Coast Guard radiocommunication station.

== See also ==
- Cordero Channel
