= Savary Island =

Island in British Columbia, Canada

Native name: Áyhus (Comox language)
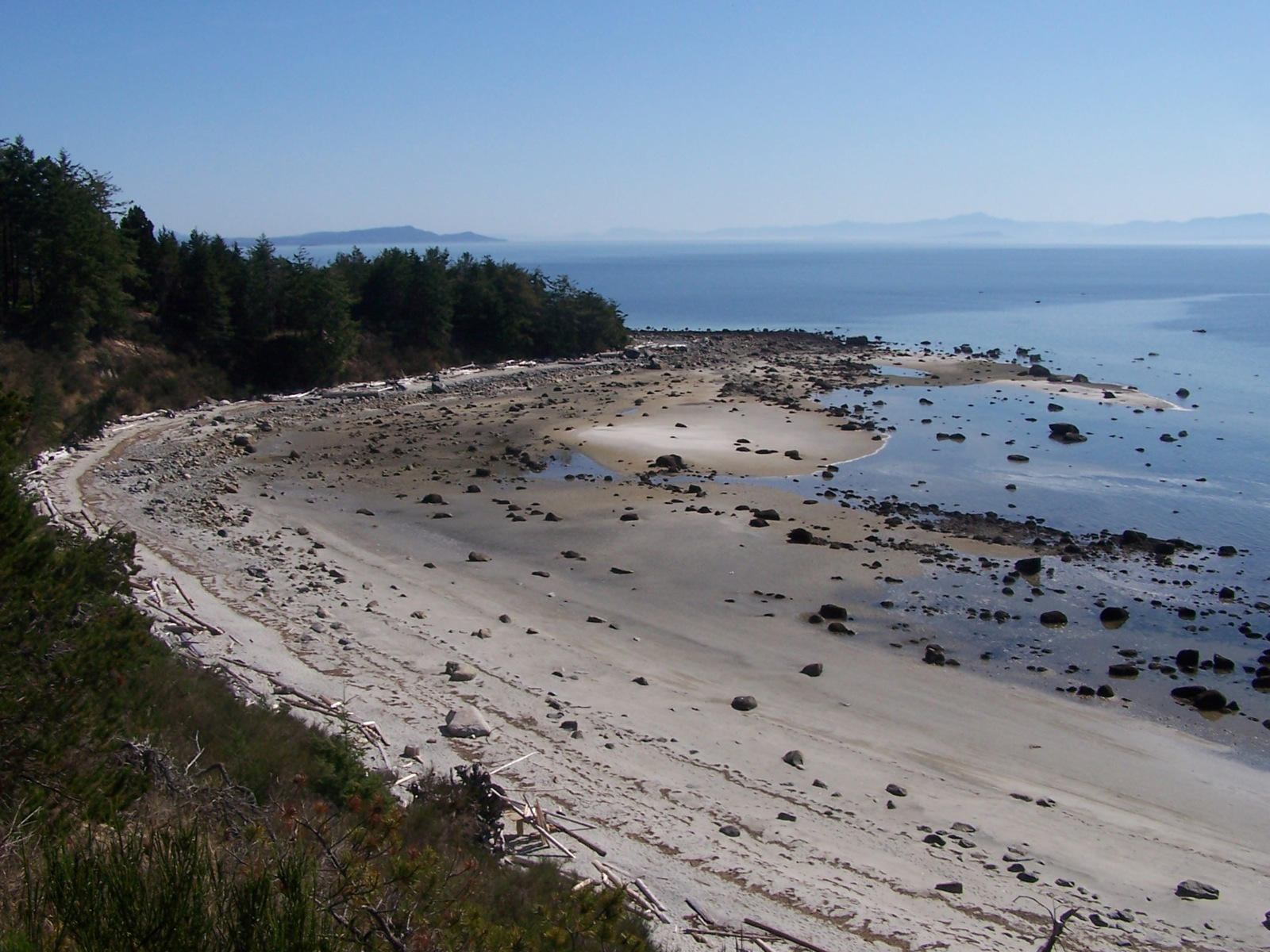
- The south shore of Savary Island

- Location of Savary Island (bottom right)

Geography
- Location: Salish Sea
- Coordinates: 49°56′21″N 124°48′48″W
- Archipelago: Discovery Islands
- Highest elevation: 68 m (223 ft)

Administration
- Canada
- Province: British Columbia
- Regional district: qathet Regional District

Additional information
- Time zone: PT (UTC−07:00)

Savary Island or Áyhus is an island in British Columbia, Canada. Located in the northern part of the Strait of Georgia, it is 144 kilometres (89 mi) northwest of Vancouver. It is approximately 0.8-1.5 km wide and 7.5 kilometres (4.7 mi) long. It has a permanent population of about 100, expanding to 2,000 or more in the summer months. Savary Island lies within the traditional territory of the Tla'amin Nation.

== History ==
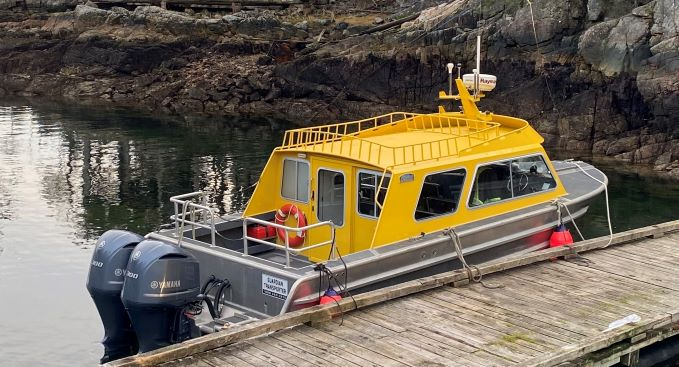
Savary Island Ferry at Dock

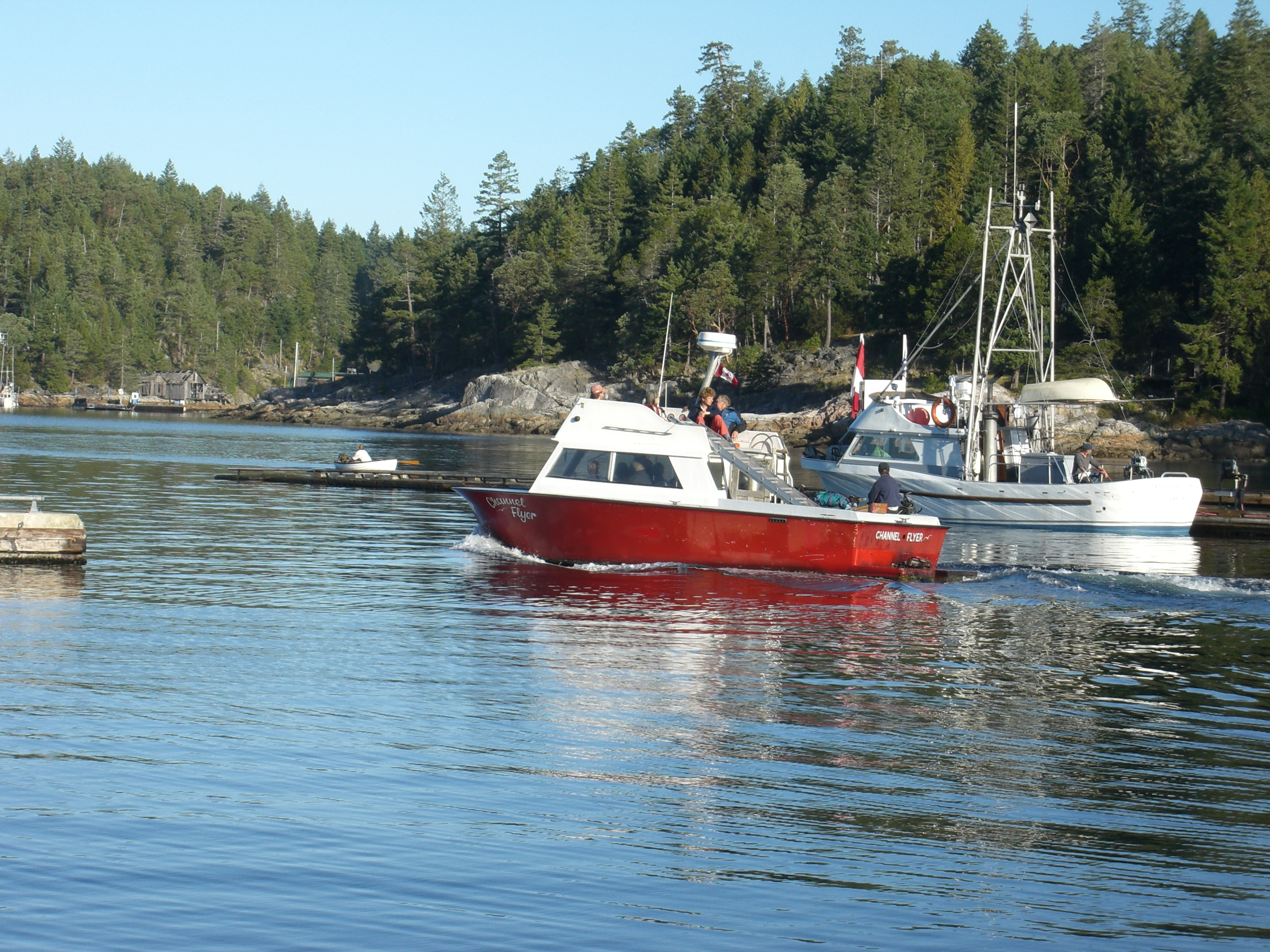
Lund Water Taxi.

=== First Nations Settlement ===
Archaeological evidence documents the occupation by Coast Salish peoples in this area of the Strait of Georgia for over 4,000 years. The island is within the territory of the Tla'amin (Sliammon) First Nation. In the language Ayajuthem spoken by the Tla'amin peoples, the whole island is known by two names: Ihohs (previously spelled Áyhus), meaning 'double-headed serpent' and Kayaykwon which is an allusion in Ayajuthem to the three main water sources found in the island. The western tip of the Island—named Indian Point by colonial settlers—is called Thetik or Thah teq in Ayajuthem, meaning 'broken off'. The area known by locals as The Meadow is called T’it’may in Ayajuthem, meaning 'wild cherry trees'. The area of the spring at Beacon Point is called Xixajayis in the Ayajuthem language. Over 13 archaeological sites, protected by the BC Heritage Conservation Act, have been registered on the Island, including a large habitation and use site on the eastern edge, a signal site atop the high south-southwesterly crest of the island, and numerous ancestral remains. These fragile archaeological sites reflect life in the pre-contact era.

=== European exploration (18th century) ===
It is possible that European ships were in the vicinity of the island in the mid-18th century. Tla'amin (Sliammon) First Nation oral history records the destruction and sinking of a European trade ship in that period. In 1791 José María Narváez commanded a small schooner, the Santa Saturnina, on an expedition to chart the Strait of Juan de Fuca and Strait of Georgia. He reached Jervis Inlet and was able to determine that Texada Island was in fact an island. In the distance to the north he saw a couple points of higher land, one probably Cape Mudge on Quadra Island, and another to the east, of unclear identity. In June 1792 the Spanish ships Sutil and Mexicana, under Galiano, and the British ships Discovery and Chatham, under Vancouver sailed by the island on their way to Desolation Sound. On or about June 25, 1792, Vancouver gave the name "Savary's Island". In early July a boat survey team led by Peter Puget and Joseph Whidbey charted Savary Island and spent at least one night on shore, meeting a group of Indigenous people at island's eastern end. Puget did not refer to the island as Savary, instead simply calling it "Indian Island".

=== European settlement (Late 19th century) ===
Permanent European settlement on the island did not begin until well into the 19th century. In the 1870s the government subdivided the island into lots for homesteading despite Indigenous establishments on the island.

Jack Green, the first non-Indigenous permanent resident, was an early settler who built a cabin and store in 1886. Green Point (now known as Mace Point) was named for him. In around 1893 Green and his business partner, Taylor, were murdered on Savary during a store robbery. The events of the robbery and murder mirror the robbery by the Flying Dutchman in Union Bay. Green's murderer, Hugh Lynn of the Lynn Valley clan, was eventually captured in a multi-thousand mile, multinational chase and sent to the gallows.

=== Development (Early 20th century) ===
The first hotel seems to have been "The Savary", built in 1914, near the Government Wharf. This hotel remained in operation until 1932 when it was destroyed in a fire. At the other end of the island, the Ashworth family built the Royal Savary Hotel at Indian Point.

Gradually, private boats and water taxis from Lund provided the most common access to the island. The steamship services ended in the 1940s (Union Steamships) and 1950s (Gulf Steamship Line).

For a brief time an airstrip was operating on the island, but it was later closed due to safety concerns (two children were killed while riding on ATVs). The main air access to Savary has been by seaplane and boats that come from Lund, a nearby town. In the summers, many island commuters from away come and go on seaplanes, especially on Friday and Sunday evening flights.

=== Shipwrecks ===
Over the years there have been several shipwrecks (including the Union Steamship Steamer Capilano in 1915) and aircraft crashes (including a small single engine crash in Seaweed Bay in the 1960s). The incidents include: an RCAF Hurricane fighter that crashed off Savary in 1943; lone survivor (12-year-old Fred Ilott) of the PowRivCo Tug Teeshoe sinking who washed up on Savary in the 1950s (Teeshoe: A Powell River Story by Filmmaker Jan Padgett); a Cessna on the airstrip; two fishboats, one in the Gulf and one in Malaspina Strait, each with loss of life; and a Gulf ship that sank on Dinner Rock in 1947. There have also been swimming and pleasure boating incidents over the years.

In the 1960s human remains were found on Savary and these were transferred to the Laboratory of Archaeology at UBC. These ancestral remains were returned by UBC to the Tla'amin (Sliammon) First Nation in a repatriation ceremony for burial at Sliammon in June 2006.

In 1982 the Royal Savary Hotel was demolished. Since then several B&Bs have opened on the island.

== Geology and soils ==
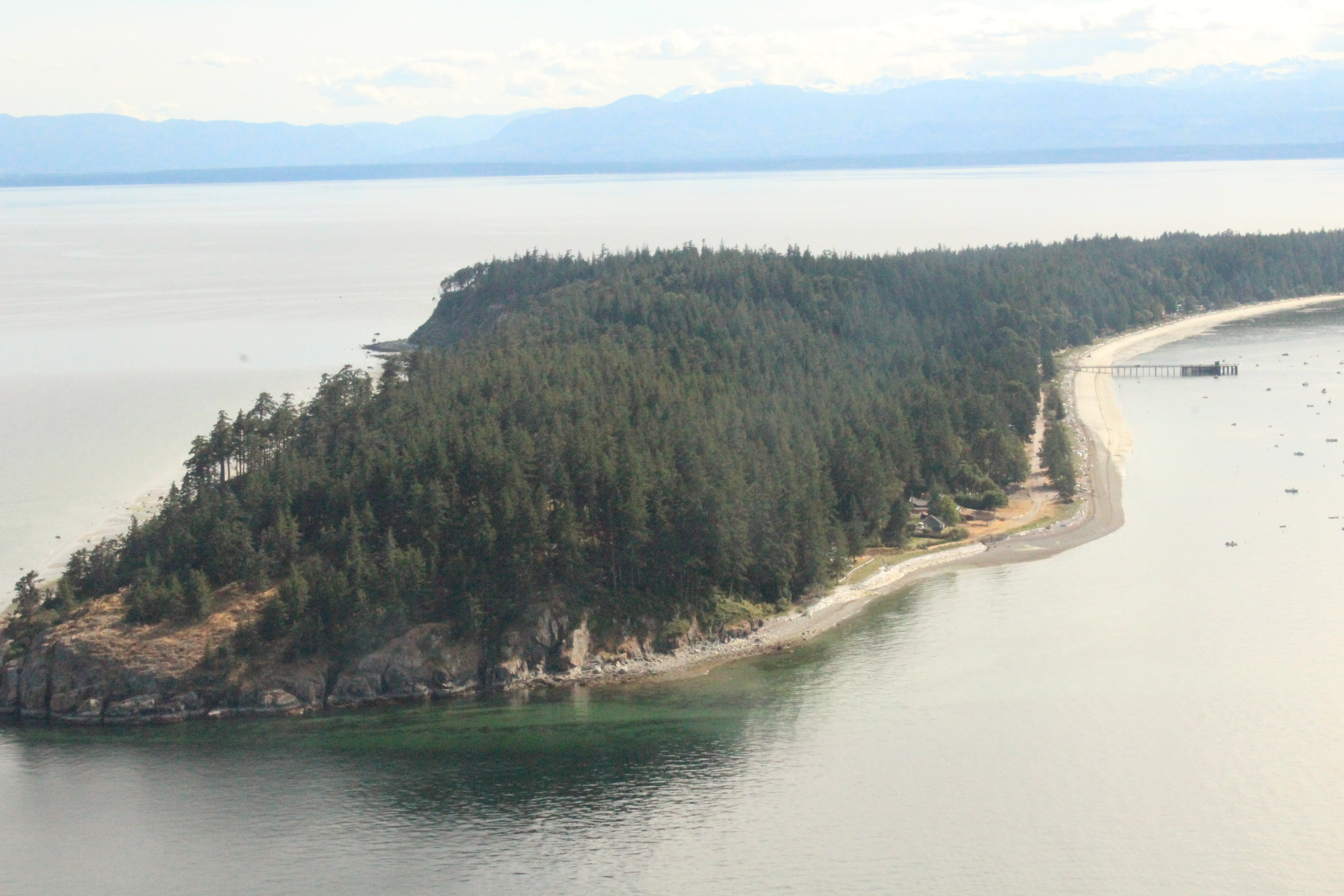
Eastern tip of Savary Island, seen from a floatplane

This island is composed mostly of unconsolidated material such as glacial till, marine clay, and sand. This comes primarily from the Pleistocene era as material deposited by meltwater streams from glaciers which advanced southward through the Strait of Georgia over 20,000 years ago. The Ice Age materials are overlain by Holocene (Recent) era deposits; their features include sand dunes. Bedrock is exposed only at the eastern end around Mace Point. Most of Savary's soils are sandy, with Ae horizon development sufficient to make them resemble classic podzols, although their B horizon chemistry qualifies them as brunisols. Since deglaciation (approximately 10,000 years ago), continued erosion under the general influence of prevailing south easterly storm waves, has caused the disappearance of much of the "original island". What remains today is very much in flux as the twin forces of erosion and accretion gradually move or shift the boundaries of the island. As one study described it, "With no exterior sources of sediment, the Island will continue to cannibalize its south coast."

== Climate ==
In the rain-shadow of Vancouver Island, Savary Island receives between 950 and 1,300 mm of precipitation annually, with maximum amounts in late fall through mid-winter. No permanent streams exist on the island, but at least one spring may be found mid-island called Indian Springs. The dry warm summers and erodible soils condition distinctive ecologic settings and surface processes (including wind erosion and deposition). In addition, storm waves, which are predominantly from the southeast, have important erosion and sediment transport effects along the south shore of Savary.

== Ecology ==
=== Flora ===
Common trees are Douglas-fir, western hemlock, western red cedar, lodgepole pine, grand fir, red alder, bigleaf maple and arbutus. It is claimed that one of the largest arbutus trees in the world is on the island. A few western white pine are present. A tiny population of Garry oak occurs at the eastern end — the northernmost natural occurrence of this species along the coast. It has splendid beaches, arbutus groves, meadows, and sand cliffs. Salal is the most plentiful shrub in the forest under-storey. Red huckleberry, evergreen huckleberry and red flowering currant are among the other shrubs present. Many of the open areas have been conquered by alien species such as Scotch broom, gorse and Himalayan blackberry.

=== Fauna ===
The animal population includes birds (bald eagles, barred owls, kingfishers, cliff and northern rough-winged swallows, seagulls, sandpipers, oyster catchers, and herons), mammals (black-tailed deer, mink, harbour seals, sea lions, otters, bats and mice), reptiles (garter snakes and northern alligator lizard), and numerous invertebrates. Surprisingly, the raccoon is absent; its failure to become established on the island has allowed ground-nesting birds to maintain their populations. Mink is the only native predatory mammal on land and has many mice to prey on.

== Governance ==
Prior to colonization, Savary was governed by the Tla'amin Nation under Tla'amin law. For many decades after colonization, there was no government to speak of on Savary. Eventually, Savary Island became part of the Powell River Regional District, now qathet Regional District. In the late 1990s, the Regional District set began drafting an official community plan for the island.

Draft OCPs were prepared in 2001, 2002, 2006 and 2025.

On February 22, 2007, the Savary Island Official Community Plan, Bylaw No. 403, 2006 was adopted by the Powell River Regional District. The principal aim of the OCP is to maintain Savary Island's unique character and rustic island lifestyle while protecting the island's ground water resources, its sensitive ecosystems, and its unique biophysical characteristics.

== Culture ==
Savary Island has inspired a great deal of creativity; artists whose work features Savary include Stephanie Aitken, Helen Griffin, Charles Hepburn Scott, Anne-Marie Harvey, David Burns, Sheldon Heppner, Toni Onley, E. J. Hughes, Keith Pepper and Michael Kluckner. From the early 1900s Savary Island was visited regularly by visual artists working in various media. In the 1930s it became the site of summer sketch camps of the Vancouver School of Art, which were often based at the Royal Savary Hotel. An artefact of these camps is a mimeographed newsletter produced by the students, The Savary Pudding.

The natural surroundings of Savary inspired poet Alice Brewer to verse found in her 1926 chapbook entitled Spring in Savary.
