= Refuge Cove, British Columbia =

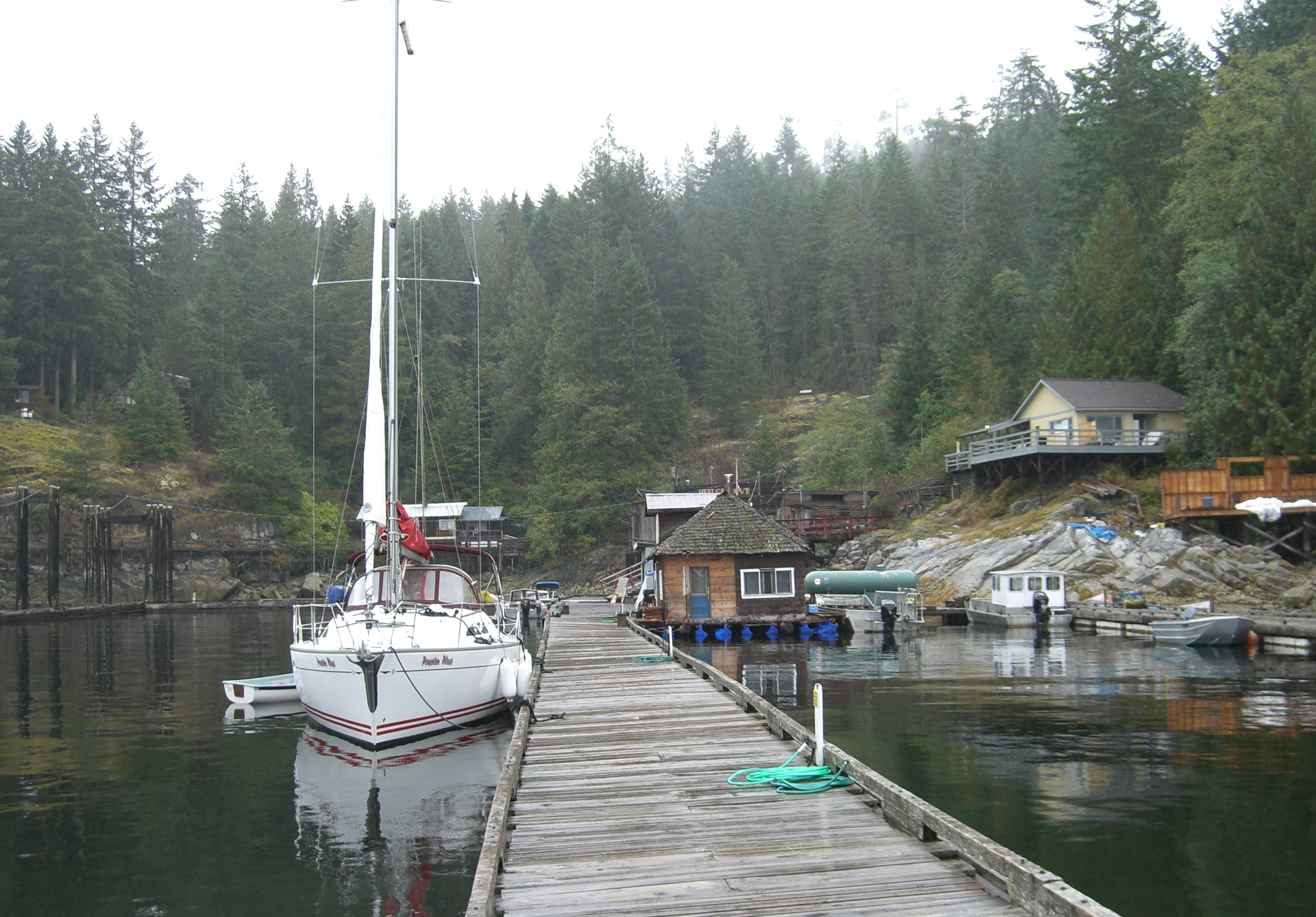
- Refuge Cove

- Location of in British Columbia
- Coordinates: 50°07′29″N 124°50′42″W
- Country: Canada
- Province: British Columbia

Refuge Cove is a locality in the Canadian province of British Columbia, located on West Redonda Island in the heart of the Desolation Sound area of the Inside Passage. It serves as a centrally located supply stop for boaters travelling in or near Desolation Sound, offering a wide range of services including moorage, fuel, groceries, ice, showers, laundry, espresso, and other supplies.

Most of the services are seasonal, operating from June through September. During the rest of the year, the general store and fuel docks are open Monday, Wednesday, and Friday from 1:00 PM to 3:00 PM.

Refuge Cove is home to about twenty families during the warm summer months. Hundreds of boaters stop here daily during the summer, relaxing and provisioning for their Desolation Sound adventures. During the colder seasons, the population hovers around 12 residents.

Refuge Cove is located about 150 kilometers northwest of Vancouver, between Vancouver Island and the mainland at the north end of the Strait of Georgia.

The two ways to arrive directly in Refuge Cove are by boat and by float plane.

Visitors travelling by car can take BC Ferries from Vancouver or Victoria to Powell River, and drive the short distance northward to Lund. From there, a private boat or Access Point Marine Transport can take visitors the rest of the way to Refuge Cove, about 13 miles.
