= Qathet Regional District =

Regional district in British Columbia, Canada

qathet Powell River (1967–2018)
- Regional district
- qathet Regional District
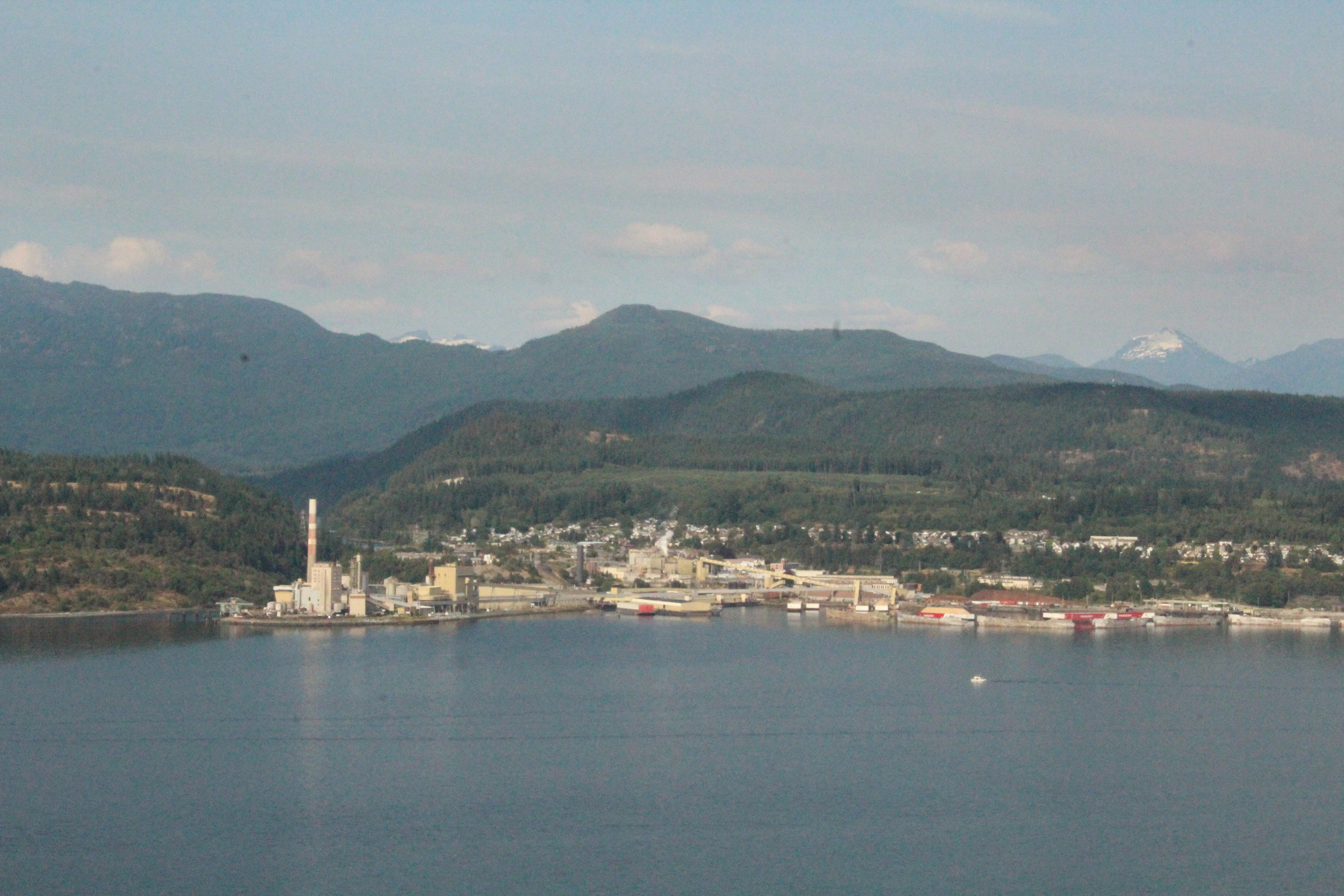
- City of Powell River

- Logo

- Location in British Columbia
- Country: Canada
- Province: British Columbia
- Administrative office location: Powell River

Government
  - Type: Regional district
  - Body: Board of Directors
  - Chair: Clay Brander, Electoral Area C
  - Electoral Areas: A; B; C; D; E

Area
  - Land: 5,075.33 km^{2} (1,959.60 sq mi)

Population (2021)
  - Total: 21,496
  - Density: 4.24/km^{2} (11.0/sq mi)
- Website: www.qathet.ca

The qathet Regional District (Note: The orthography of the indigenous Comox language does not use capital letters.) (/ˈkɑːθɛt/, qRD) is a regional district in the Canadian province of British Columbia. Its only incorporated municipality is the City of Powell River, although it includes a number of unincorporated areas. The district encompasses a land area of 5,075.33 square kilometres (1,959.60 sq mi). The district was formerly known as the Powell River Regional District. Because of frequent confusion between the identical names of Powell River district and city, the district's name was changed in 2018 to qathet, from q̓at̓ᶿɛt, meaning "working together, bringing together" in the Comox (ʔayʔaǰuθəm) language of the Tla'amin (ɬəʔamɩn), k̓ómoks, Homalco (χʷɛmaɬkʷu), and Klahoose (ƛohos) Nations.

== Geography ==
The district is bounded by the mainland portion of the Strathcona Regional District to the north, and to the east by the Squamish-Lillooet and Sunshine Coast Regional Districts. On the mainland, this includes the area southeast of Powell River to the ferry terminal at Saltery Bay and from Wildwood, northwest of Powell River to Desolation Sound and the terminus of Highway 101 in Lund. Lasqueti Island and Texada Island, along with the southernmost Discovery Islands (including Hernando and Savary), are included, as are the largely uninhabited lands to the north and west of this area.

== Government ==
Its head offices are located in Powell River. The district is governed by a board of seven directors: five electoral area directors who are elected for a four-year term by voters in the electoral areas, and two municipal directors who are first elected to the City of Powell River’s council and then appointed by council to the regional board. The board chair is elected annually by all directors.

== Demographics ==
As a census division in the 2021 Census of Population conducted by Statistics Canada, the qathet Regional District had a population of 21,496 living in 10,057 of its 11,921 total private dwellings, a change of 7.1% from its 2016 population of 20,070. With a land area of 5,067.89 km^{2} (1,956.72 sq mi), it had a population density of 4.2/km^{2} (11.0/sq mi) in 2021. As of the 2006 census, 19,599 people lived in the district.

Panethnic groups in the qathet Regional District (1996−2021)
Panethnic group	2021		2016		2011		2006		2001		1996	
Panethnic group	Pop.	%	Pop.	%	Pop.	%	Pop.	%	Pop.	%	Pop.	%
European (Note: Statistic includes all persons that did not make up part of a visible minority or an indigenous identity.)	18,200	86.42%	17,440	88.91%	17,580	89.95%	17,700	91.57%	18,085	92.41%	18,480	93.55%
Indigenous	1,805	8.57%	1,575	8.03%	1,565	8.01%	1,105	5.72%	1,160	5.93%	845	4.28%
East Asian (Note: Statistic includes total responses of "Chinese", "Korean", and "Japanese" under visible minority section on census.)	425	2.02%	210	1.07%	125	0.64%	250	1.29%	85	0.43%	215	1.09%
Southeast Asian (Note: Statistic includes total responses of "Filipino" and "Southeast Asian" under visible minority section on census.)	205	0.97%	150	0.76%	80	0.41%	125	0.65%	75	0.38%	30	0.15%
South Asian	155	0.74%	60	0.31%	85	0.43%	60	0.31%	95	0.49%	80	0.4%
Latin American	105	0.5%	30	0.15%	0	0%	15	0.08%	35	0.18%	10	0.05%
African	80	0.38%	85	0.43%	60	0.31%	65	0.34%	25	0.13%	40	0.2%
Middle Eastern (Note: Statistic includes total responses of "West Asian" and "Arab" under visible minority section on census.)	25	0.12%	0	0%	0	0%	0	0%	10	0.05%	0	0%
Other (Note: Statistic includes total responses of "Visible minority, n.i.e." and "Multiple visible minorities" under visible minority section on census.)	45	0.21%	60	0.31%	40	0.2%	20	0.1%	0	0%	60	0.3%
Total responses	21,060	97.97%	19,615	97.73%	19,545	98.19%	19,330	98.63%	19,570	99.01%	19,755	99.09%
Total population	21,496	100%	20,070	100%	19,906	100%	19,599	100%	19,765	100%	19,936	100%
Note: Totals greater than 100% due to multiple origin responses
