= Discovery Islands =

Archipelago in the Salish Sea, British Columbia, Canada

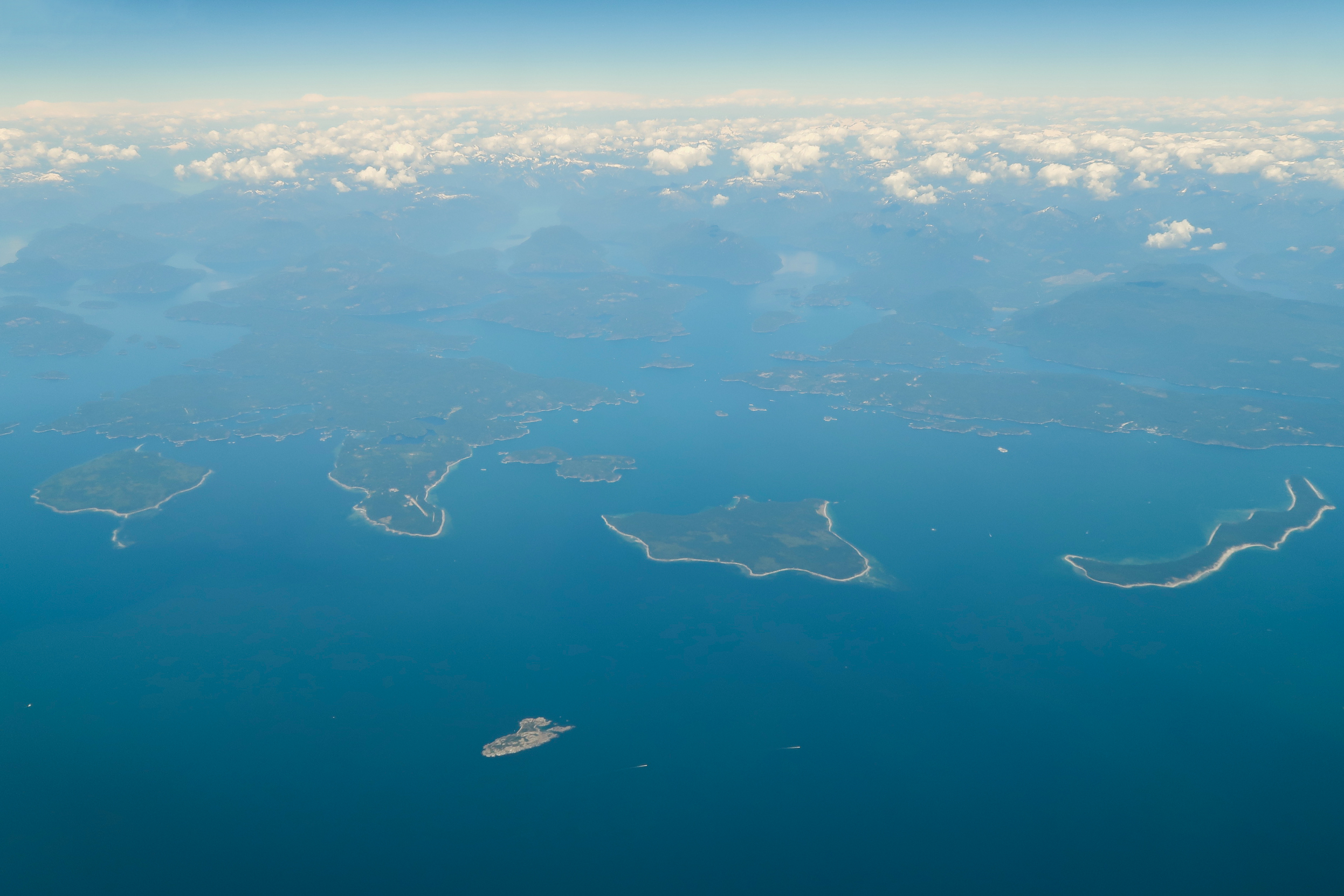
- Aerial view of the Discovery Islands

- Discovery Islands, between Vancouver Island and continental British Columbia, north of Strait of Georgia

- Location in British Columbia, Canada Discovery Islands (British Columbia)

Geography
- Location: Johnstone Strait and Salish Sea
- Coordinates: 50°16′41″N 125°09′08″W
- Major islands: 20

Administration
- Canada
- Province: British Columbia

The Discovery Islands are a group of islands located at the northern end of the Salish Sea and the eastern end of Johnstone Strait, between Vancouver Island and the mainland coast of British Columbia, Canada.

Most of these islands have very few residents. Only Quadra Island and Cortes Island have ferry service. The remainder are served by private boat or float plane.

== Geography ==
The area's complex geography can make it difficult to determine when travelling by boat whether a sighted coastline belongs to the mainland, Vancouver Island, or one of the Discovery Islands.

=== Major islands ===
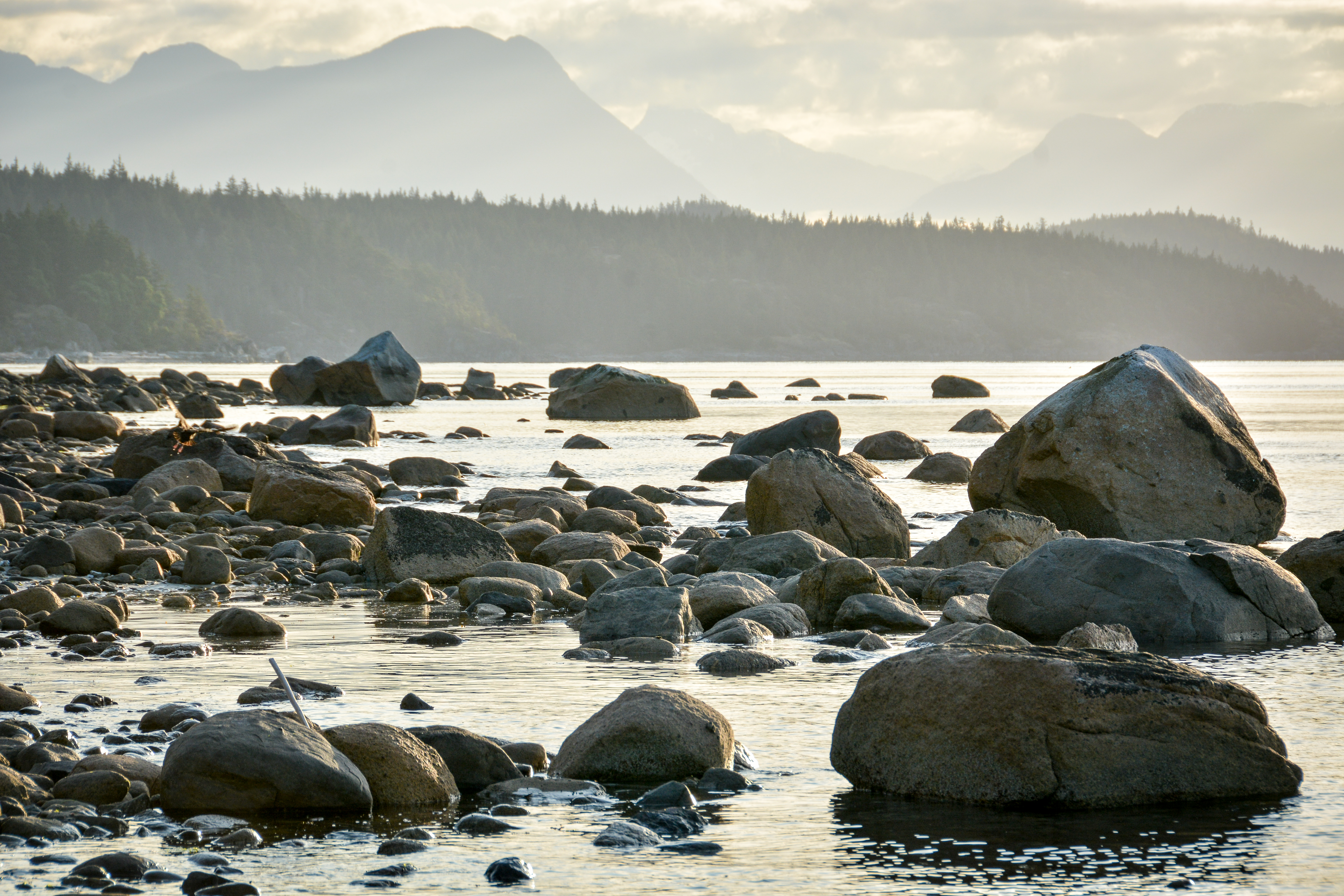
Cortes Island sunrise

The Discovery Islands are all located within the Strathcona Regional District, except for a few of the southernmost, such as Hernando Island and Savary Island, which are in the qathet Regional District. The larger islands within the Discovery Islands are:

Strathcona Regional District

- Cortes Island (west: Subtle Islands)
- Hardwicke Island (north: Poyntz, Seymour, Murray; west: Yorke; south: Helmcken)
- West Thurlow Island
- East Thurlow Island (west: Walkem Islands; south: Tum)
- Sonora Island (northwest: Hardinge, Block)
- Stuart Island
- Quadra Island (north: Okis Islands)
- Maurelle Island
- Mitlenatch Island
- Read Island (east: Hill Island, Penn Islands)
- Rendezvous Islands
  - Raza Island
- West Redonda Island (south: Mink, Kinghorn, and the Martin Islands; north: Elizabeth)
- East Redonda Island (south: Melville, Morgan, Eveleigh, Otter, and the William Islands; north: Double, Channel)
- Marina Island
- Twin Islands

qathet Regional District

- Hernando Island (east: Copeland Islands)
- Mink Island
- Savary Island

=== Major waterways ===
The Discovery Passage starts where the Strait of Georgia narrows between Quadra Island and Vancouver Island and continues north to Chatham Point, where it meets the Nodales Channel and Johnstone Strait.

== Tourism ==
The primary attraction for visitors are salmon fishing, sailing, kayaking, and hiking.

== See also ==
- Gulf Islands
- Queen Charlotte Strait
