= Cortes Island =

Island of the Discovery Islands in British Columbia, Canada

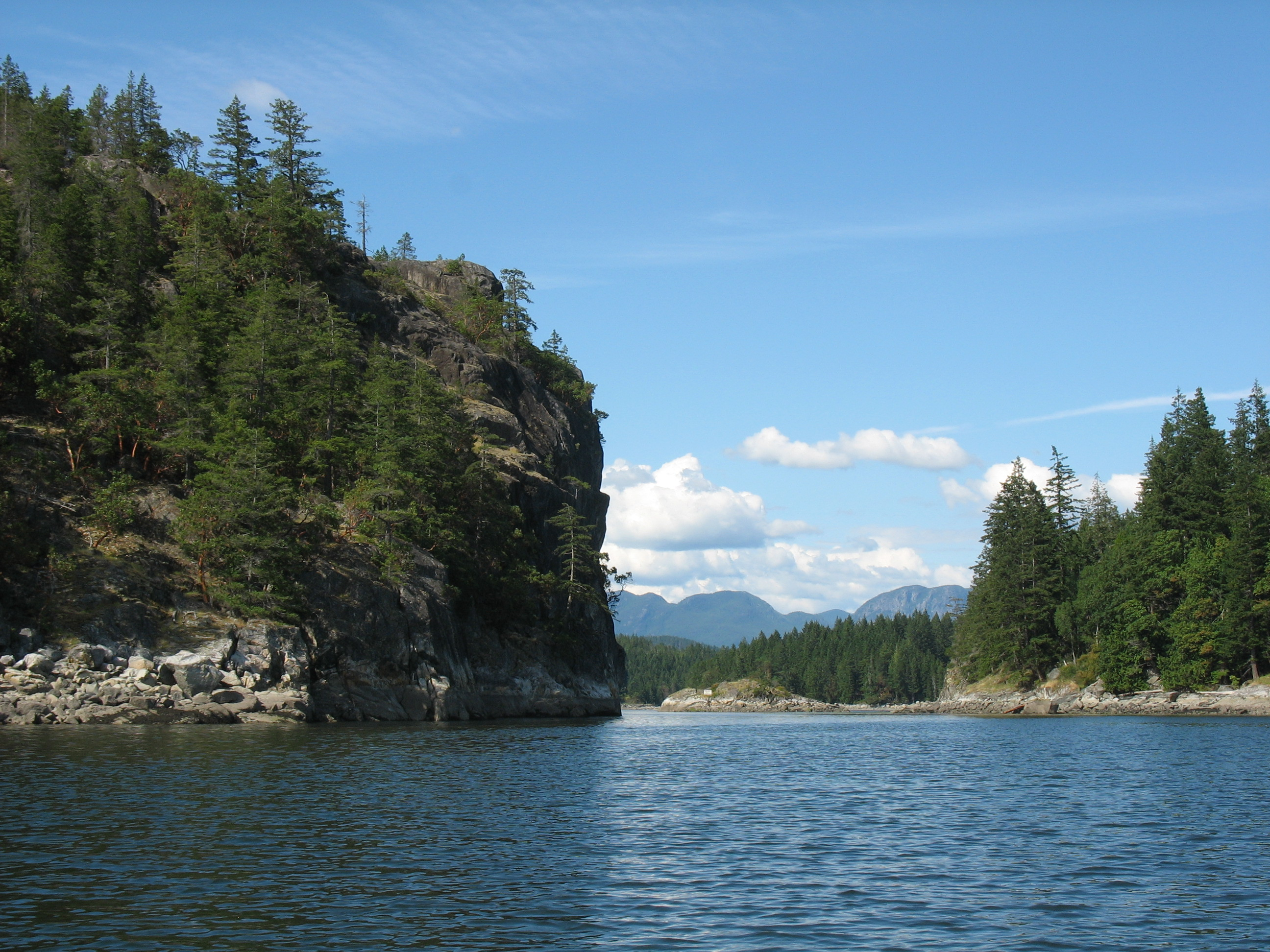
- The Gorge of Cortes Island

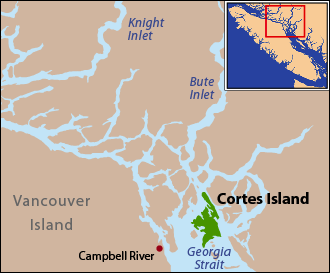
- Cortes Island is located at the northern end of the Strait of Georgia

Geography
- Location: Salish Sea
- Coordinates: 50°07′N 124°58′W
- Archipelago: Discovery Islands
- Area: 130 km^{2} (50 sq mi)
- Length: 25 km (15.5 mi)
- Width: 13 km (8.1 mi)

Administration
- Canada
- Province: British Columbia
- Regional district: Strathcona

Demographics
- Population: 1,035 (2016)
- Ethnic groups: Wei We Kai, Kwiakah, Homalco and Klahoose First Nations

Cortes Island is an island in the Discovery Islands archipelago on the coast of British Columbia, Canada. The island is 25 km (16 mi) long, 13 km (8 mi) wide, and 130 km^{2} (50 sq mi) in area. It has a population of 1,035 permanent residents (2016 census). Cortes Island lies within Electoral Area B of the Strathcona Regional District, which provides water and sewage systems, fire protection, land use planning, parks, recreation, and emergency response.

Access to Cortes Island is by plane or ferry - by seaplane to many of the island's protected harbours; by ferry from Quadra Island, which is itself accessed from Campbell River on Vancouver Island via BC Ferries.

Cortes Island is a tourist destination in the summers, with many people visiting to enjoy the peaceful atmosphere and warm weather.

== History ==
The office of the Klahoose First Nation is located on the island.

The island was named in 1792 during the expedition of Galiano and Valdés, after Hernán Cortés, the Spanish conqueror of Mexico. Despite the official Cortes spelling, which appeared on Canadian Hydrographic Service Charts, many of the island's early pioneers anglicized the name and referred to the island as Cortez. Marina Island, just southwest of Cortes Island in Sutil Channel, was also named by Galiano and Valdes in 1792, in association with Cortes Island, for La Malinche, known as Doña Marina, the Nahua woman who was interpreter, adviser, and mistress of Hernando Cortes during his conquest of Mexico. During the late 19th century Admiralty charts showed the name as Mary Island, until the original name was restored in 1906.

In July 1792 William Broughton and Archibald Menzies of the Vancouver Expedition landed at the mouth of a stream in Squirrel Cove, on the east side of Cortes Island, to take some refreshment. They were surprised to find the stream salty. They shot some large grouse and saw some deer but could not get near enough to shoot them.

== Geography ==
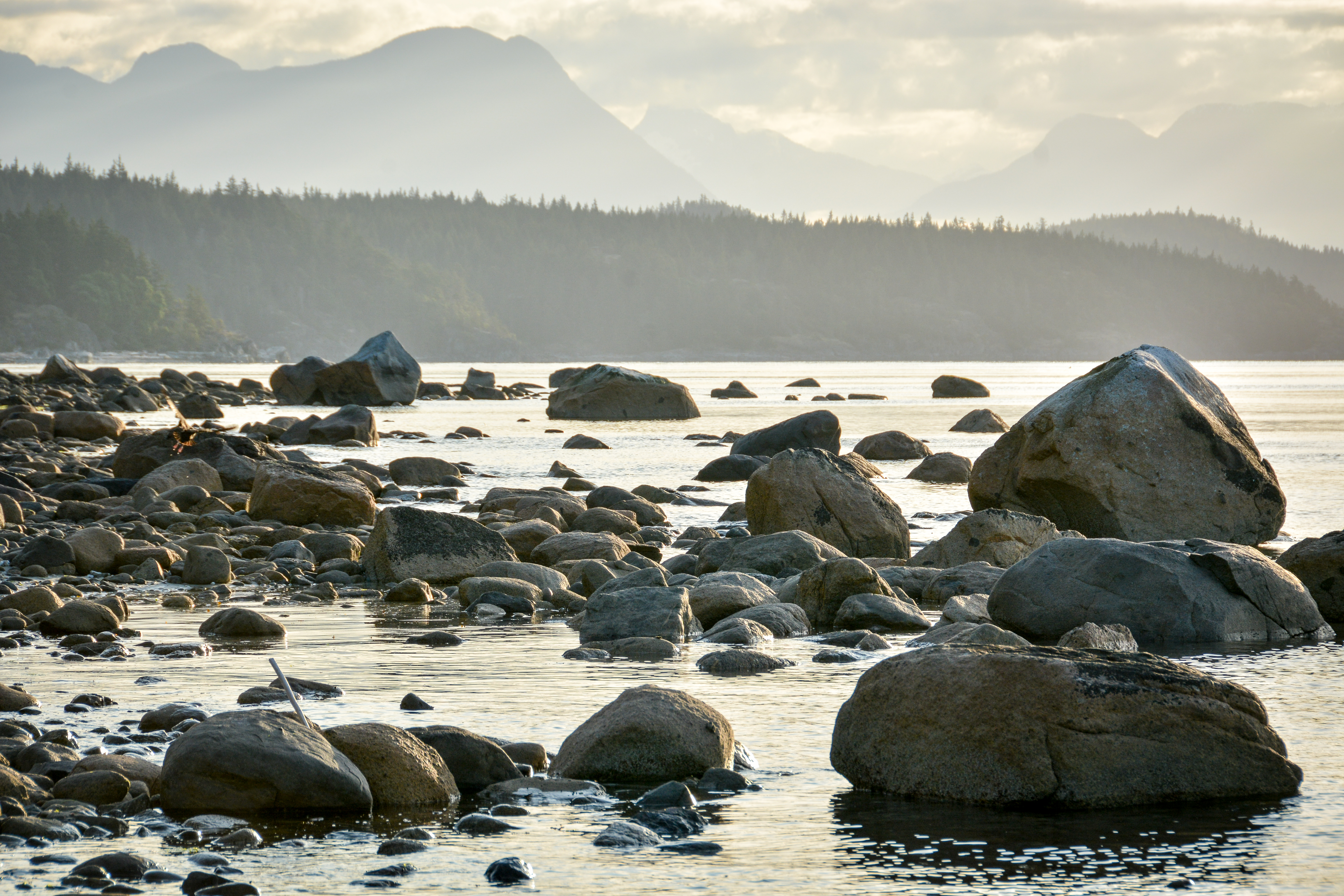
Cortes Island sunrise

Cortes Island is part of the archipelago known as the Discovery Islands in British Columbia, Canada, which lie beyond the northern end of the Gulf of Georgia, between Vancouver Island and the British Columbia Mainland. It is also considered to be part of the Northern Gulf Islands. Cortes lies on the far side of Quadra Island from the city of Campbell River, separated from Quadra Island by Sutil Channel. To the northeast of Cortes Island, across Lewis Channel, is West Redonda Island. Desolation Sound lies to the east of Cortes Island and, beyond that, the upper end of the Malaspina Peninsula. The island is located roughly halfway between Powell River and Campbell River.

=== Climate ===
Climate data for Cortes Island (1971–2000)
Month	Jan	Feb	Mar	Apr	May	Jun	Jul	Aug	Sep	Oct	Nov	Dec	Year
Record high °C (°F)	15.0 (59.0)	15.5 (59.9)	19.4 (66.9)	25.0 (77.0)	31.5 (88.7)	31.1 (88.0)	31.7 (89.1)	32.5 (90.5)	28.5 (83.3)	21.1 (70.0)	16.0 (60.8)	15.6 (60.1)	32.5 (90.5)
Mean daily maximum °C (°F)	5.4 (41.7)	7.0 (44.6)	9.4 (48.9)	12.6 (54.7)	16.6 (61.9)	19.2 (66.6)	22.1 (71.8)	21.9 (71.4)	18.3 (64.9)	12.7 (54.9)	8.0 (46.4)	5.5 (41.9)	13.2 (55.8)
Daily mean °C (°F)	3.4 (38.1)	4.6 (40.3)	6.5 (43.7)	9.1 (48.4)	12.7 (54.9)	15.4 (59.7)	17.9 (64.2)	17.9 (64.2)	14.8 (58.6)	10.1 (50.2)	5.9 (42.6)	3.7 (38.7)	10.2 (50.4)
Mean daily minimum °C (°F)	1.4 (34.5)	2.2 (36.0)	3.5 (38.3)	5.6 (42.1)	8.8 (47.8)	11.5 (52.7)	13.6 (56.5)	13.8 (56.8)	11.1 (52.0)	7.4 (45.3)	3.8 (38.8)	1.8 (35.2)	7.1 (44.8)
Record low °C (°F)	−10.6 (12.9)	−11 (12)	−6.1 (21.0)	−1.1 (30.0)	1.7 (35.1)	2.8 (37.0)	5.0 (41.0)	7.8 (46.0)	2.2 (36.0)	−3.5 (25.7)	−11 (12)	−13.9 (7.0)	−13.9 (7.0)
Average precipitation mm (inches)	172.7 (6.80)	133.2 (5.24)	116.1 (4.57)	90.6 (3.57)	70.2 (2.76)	65.1 (2.56)	50.5 (1.99)	58.8 (2.31)	71.7 (2.82)	150.1 (5.91)	211.9 (8.34)	187.7 (7.39)	1,378.6 (54.28)
Average rainfall mm (inches)	147.9 (5.82)	121.0 (4.76)	110.6 (4.35)	88.6 (3.49)	70.2 (2.76)	65.1 (2.56)	50.5 (1.99)	58.8 (2.31)	71.7 (2.82)	149.6 (5.89)	207.0 (8.15)	167.8 (6.61)	1,308.7 (51.52)
Average snowfall cm (inches)	24.8 (9.8)	12.2 (4.8)	5.5 (2.2)	2.0 (0.8)	0.0 (0.0)	0.0 (0.0)	0.0 (0.0)	0.0 (0.0)	0.0 (0.0)	0.6 (0.2)	4.9 (1.9)	19.9 (7.8)	69.9 (27.5)
Average precipitation days (≥ 0.2 mm)	19.2	17.3	17.9	16.0	13.7	12.6	8.6	9.2	10.2	16.6	21.3	20.7	183.4
Average rainy days (≥ 0.2 mm)	17.3	15.9	17.5	16.0	13.7	12.6	8.6	9.2	10.2	16.6	21.1	18.5	177.2
Average snowy days (≥ 0.2 cm)	3.8	2.5	1.7	0.46	0.0	0.0	0.0	0.0	0.0	0.08	1.2	3.6	13.4
Source: Environment Canada

== Demographics ==
=== Administration ===
Cortes Island is in the Sunshine Coast Forest District and the Vancouver Island Ministry of Environment's Vancouver Island Region. The island is part of the North Island Provincial Electoral District.

=== Communities ===
Communities on the island include Cortes Bay, Whaletown, Squirrel Cove and Mansons Landing. Desolation Sound is off the east shore of the island. Forestry, fishing and mining have featured in its history. There is also a campground at Smelt Bay Provincial Park.

The Campbell River School District operates the Cortes Elementary / Jr. Secondary school on the island. Until 2010 there was also the Linnaea School, a non-traditional school which offered a different approach on education. It was closed due to a lack of students and funding. After the ninth grade, students must either switch to homeschooling or transfer to a school off the island. In addition, a seasonal Canadian Coast Guard Inshore Rescue Boat Station is located in Cortes Bay during the summer. The station is staffed by a coxswain and 2 crewmembers aboard a Zodiac Hurricane Rigid Hull Inflatable Boat (RHIB).

== Tourism ==
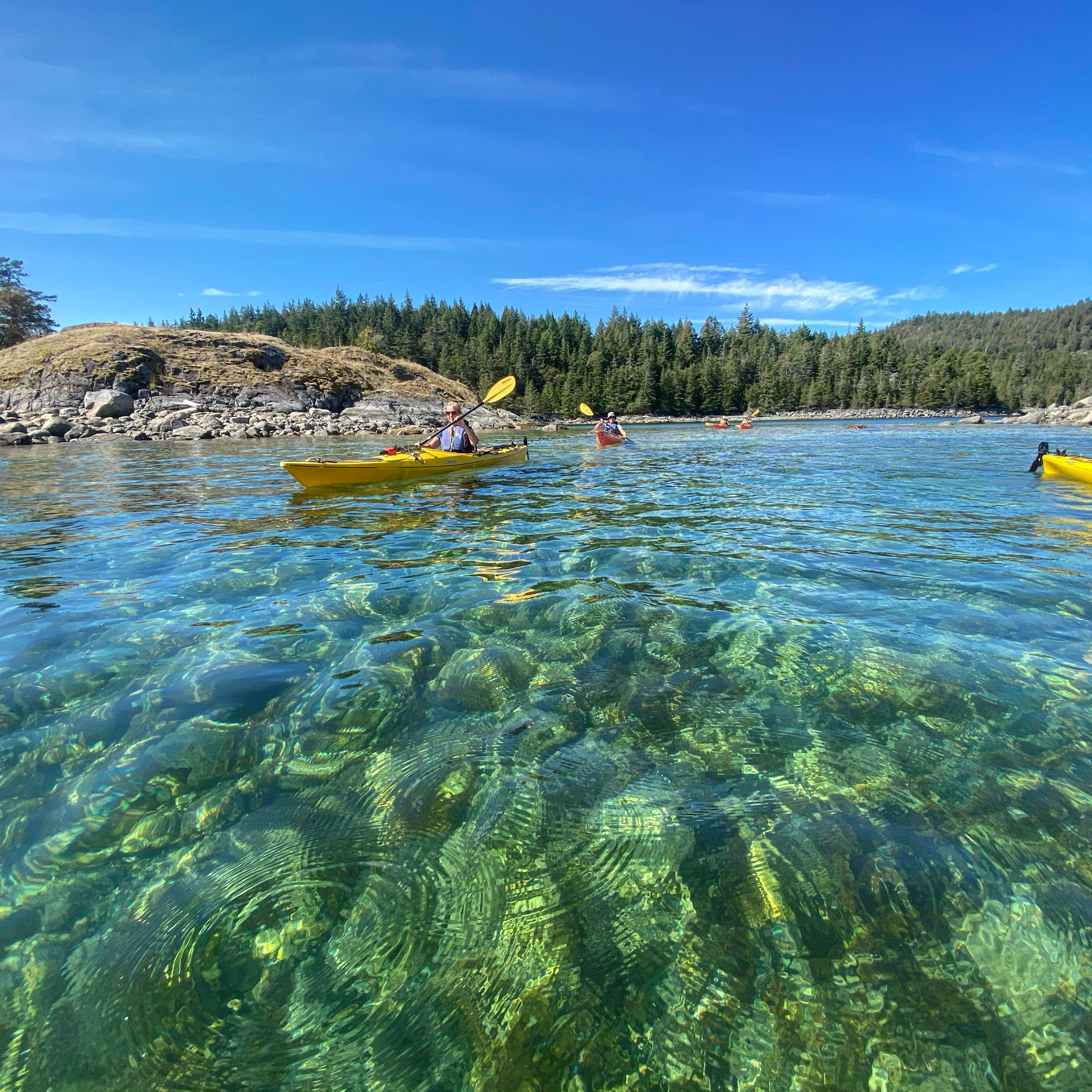
A kayaking tour

Cortes is known for the wilderness and remote nature of the community. Kayaking is a popular activity around the island, and the Cortes Museum and Archives hosts the local visitor's centre. Craft markets are held weekly at the Manson's Landing Community Hall, and the Gorge Harbour Marina Resort.

Hiking through K'was park and Carrington bay are popular activities for tourists visiting the island.
