= Discovery Passage =

Strait between Vancouver Island and the Discovery Islands of British Columbia, Canada

- French: Passage Discovery
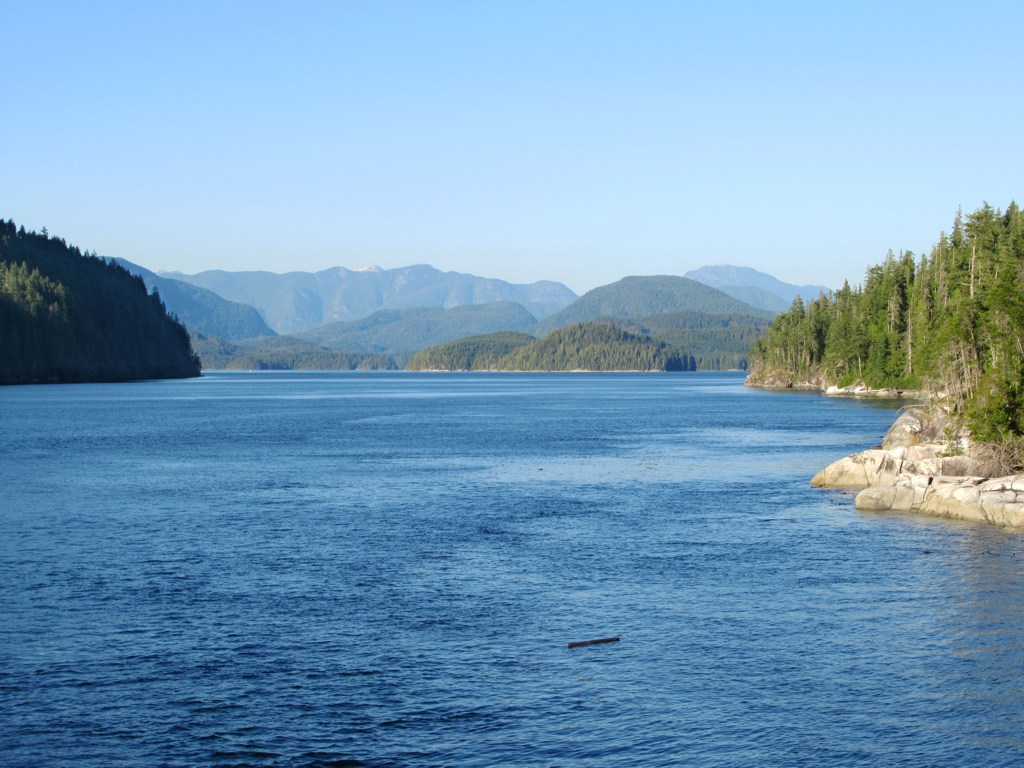
- Looking south from between Vancouver Island and Sonora Island

- Location within British Columbia

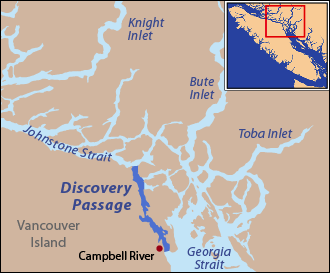
- Location: British Columbia, Canada
- Coordinates: 50°13′N 125°23′W
- Type: Strait
- Part of: Inside Passage, Discovery Islands
- Ocean/sea sources: Salish Sea
- Max. length: 25 km (16 mi)
- Max. width: 2 km (1.2 mi)
- Max. depth: 100 m (330 ft)
- Sections/sub-basins: Seymour Narrows

The Discovery Passage (French: Passage Discovery) is a strait that forms part of the Inside Passage between Vancouver Island and the Discovery Islands of British Columbia. The strait is considered the most important natural passage for vessels entering or leaving the Salish Sea from the north.

== Etymology ==
The strait was named by Captain Vancouver in 1792 after his ship, HMS Discovery. Other sources say that the passage was named by Captain Kellett because Vancouver's Discovery had sailed through the passage earlier.

== Geography ==
The strait has a length of 25 km (16 mi) and an average width of 2 km (1.2 mi), narrowing to only 750 m (820 yd) at Seymour Narrows. Most of the eastern shoreline of the passage is Quadra Island, with Sonora Island forming the shoreline at the northern end where Discovery Passage meets Johnstone Strait. The southern end of Discovery Passage enters the Strait of Georgia, the northern arm of the Salish Sea, at Campbell River, British Columbia.

The strait is frequently transited by cruise ships, cargo ships, fishing boats, and ships of the Alaska Marine Highway and BC Ferries systems.

== See also ==
- Cordero Channel
- Sutil Channel
