= Johnstone Strait =

Waterway between northern Vancouver Island and mainland British Columbia, Canada

- French: Détroit de Johnstone
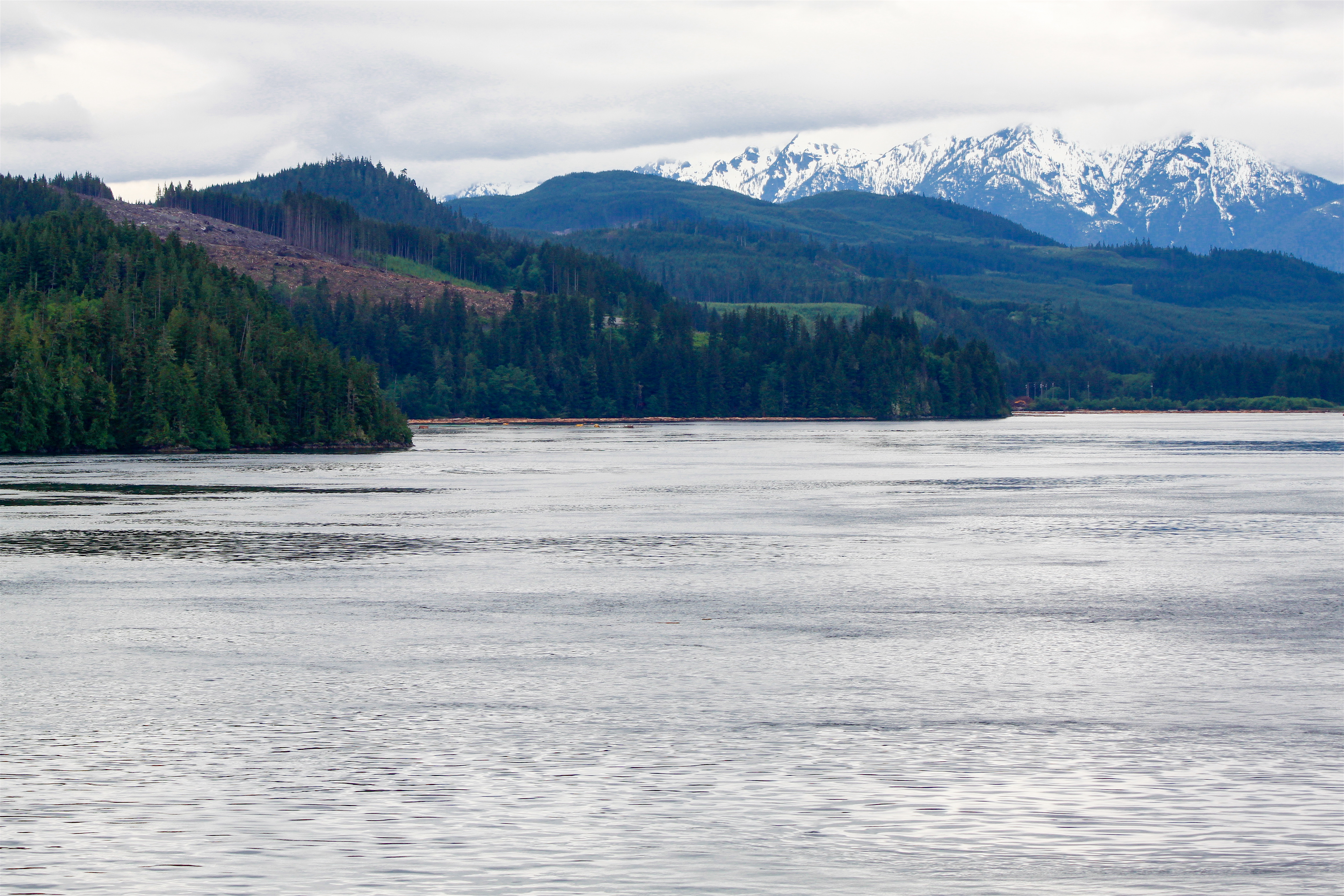
- Johnstone Strait backdropped by the Vancouver Island Ranges

- Location in British Columbia

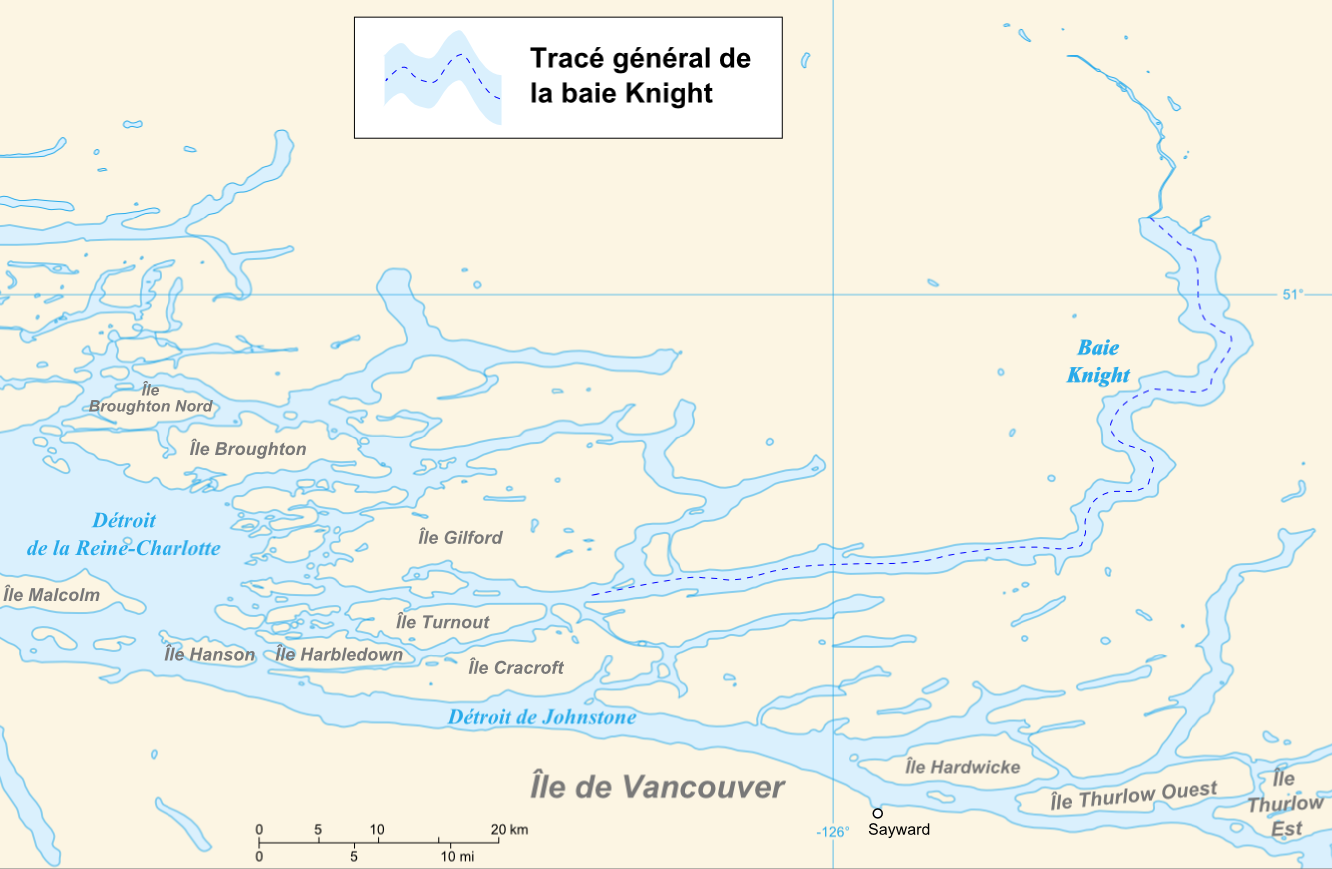
- Map of Johnstone Strait (bottom) and the surrounding islands and inlets
- Location: British Columbia, Canada
- Coordinates: 50°28′0″N 126°05′0″W
- Type: Channel
- Ocean/sea sources: Pacific Ocean

The Johnstone Strait (French: Détroit de Johnstone) is a 110 km (68 mi) channel along the north east coast of Vancouver Island in British Columbia, Canada. Opposite the Vancouver Island coast, running north to south, are Hanson Island, West Cracroft Island, the mainland British Columbia Coast, Hardwicke Island, West Thurlow Island and East Thurlow Island. At that point, the strait meets the Discovery Passage which connects to the Georgia Strait.

== Name origin ==
The Strait was named by Vancouver for James Johnstone, master of the armed tender Chatham. In 1792, his survey party established that Vancouver Island was an island.

== Geography ==
The strait is between 2.5 km (1.6 mi) and 5 km (3.1 mi) wide. It is a major navigation channel on the west coast of North America. It is the preferred channel for vessels from the Strait of Georgia leaving to the north of Vancouver Island through the Queen Charlotte Strait bound for Prince Rupert, Haida Gwaii, Alaska, and the North Pacific Ocean, and for southbound vessels from those areas bound for the ports of Vancouver, Seattle, and Tacoma.

There are no cities or towns along the length of the strait. Telegraph Cove and Robson Bight on Vancouver Island are along the strait near its north end and the village of Sayward on Kelsey Bay is near its midpoint.

== Ecology ==
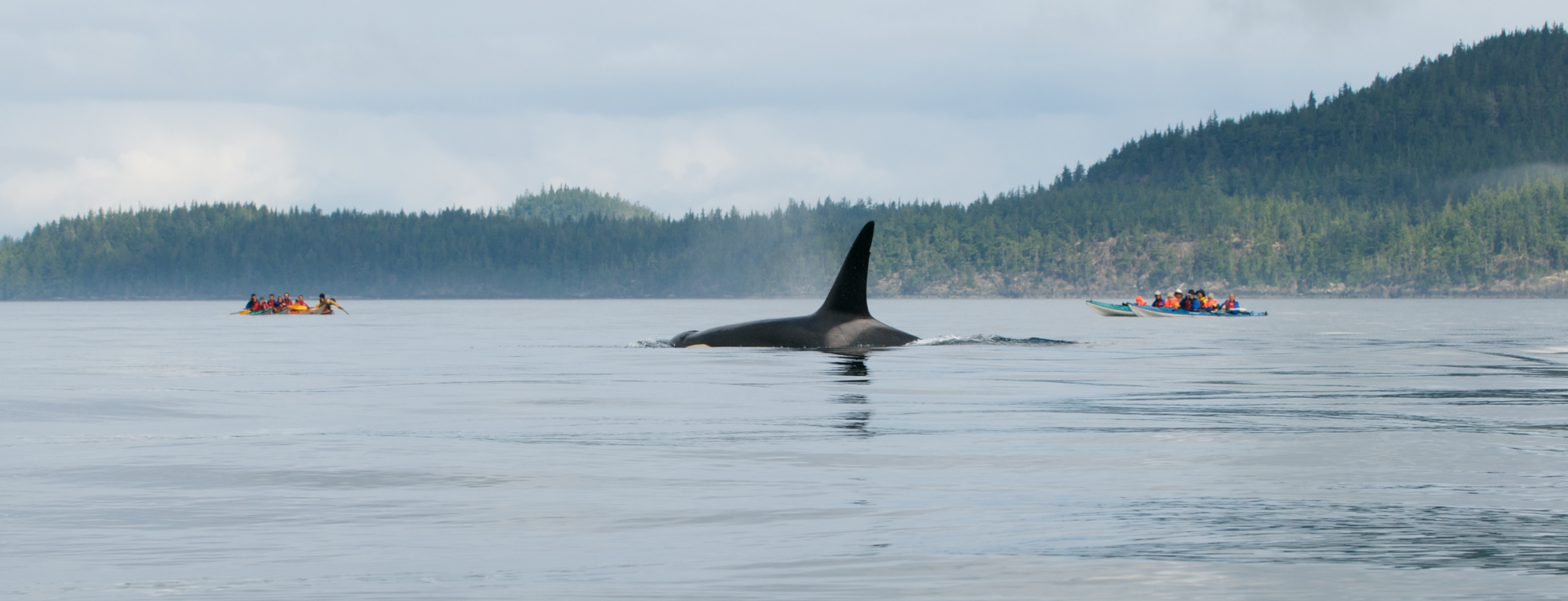
Johnstone Strait is the summer home to a large population of orcas.

During the summer months, the Strait is home to approximately 150 orcas, which are often seen by kayakers and boaters packed with tourists.

Scientists including Michael Bigg and Paul Spong have been researching the orcas in the Strait since 1970. Spong established the OrcaLab, based on studying the Orcas in their natural habitat without interfering with their lives or their habitat. The strait includes the Robson Bight (Michael Bigg) Ecological Reserve.

== See also ==
- Cordero Channel
