= Strathcona Regional District =

Regional district in British Columbia, Canada

Strathcona
- Regional district
- Strathcona Regional District
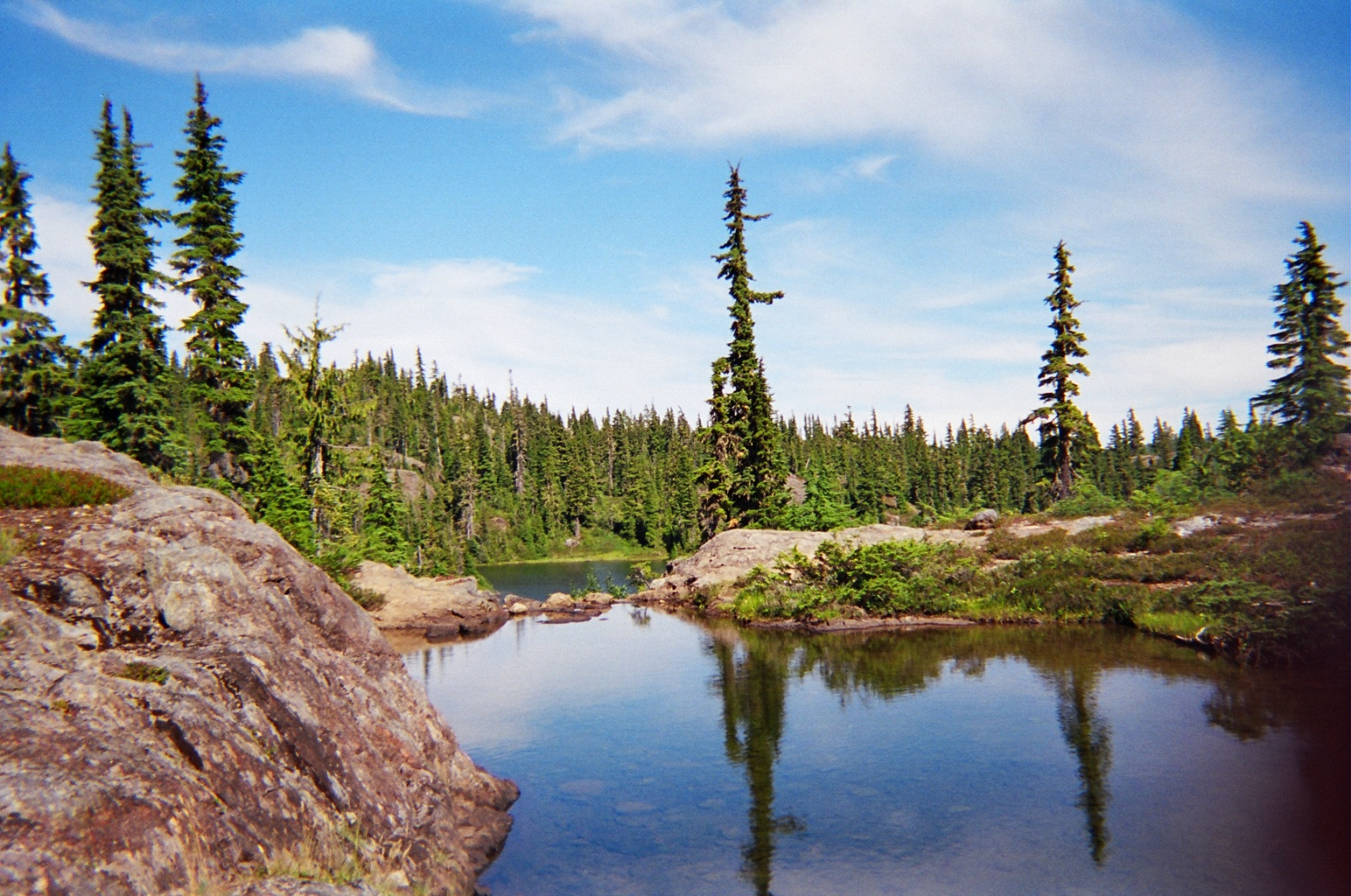
- Strathcona Provincial Park

- Logo

- Location in British Columbia
- Country: Canada
- Province: British Columbia
- Administrative office location: Campbell River

Government
  - Type: Regional district
  - Body: Board of Directors
  - Chair: Michele Babchuk (Campbell River)
  - Vice Chair: Brad Unger (Gold River)
  - Electoral Areas: A; B; C; D

Area
  - Land: 18,278.06 km^{2} (7,057.20 sq mi)

Population (2021)
  - Total: 48,150
  - Density: 2.63/km^{2} (6.8/sq mi)
- Website: srd.ca

The Strathcona Regional District is a regional district in British Columbia, Canada. It was created on February 15, 2008, encompassing the northern and western portions of the former Regional District of Comox-Strathcona. The partition left the new Strathcona Regional District with 91.6 percent of the former Comox-Strathcona's land area, but only 42.1 percent of its population. Its current territory has a land area of 18,329.948 km^{2} (7,077.232 sq mi) and a 2016 census population of 44,671 inhabitants. There are 21 named Indian reserves within its territory, with a combined 2016 census population of 1,579 and combined land area of 16.444 km^{2} (6.345 sq mi).

The District's head offices are in Campbell River, British Columbia. During a transitional period, much of its administration was carried out by the Comox Valley Regional District, based in Courtenay, British Columbia but it is now self-administered. It is governed by a board of directors comprising representatives from each of the 5 municipalities and 4 electoral areas within its boundaries. It is anticipated that the board will expand to include representatives from some of the First Nations governments within its boundaries following treaty settlements.

Most of the Discovery Islands are within the Strathcona Regional District, while a few of the southernmost ones are in the Powell River Regional District.

== Demographics ==
As a census division in the 2021 Census of Population conducted by Statistics Canada, the Strathcona Regional District had a population of 48,150 living in 21,227 of its 23,017 total private dwellings, a change of 7.8% from its 2016 population of 44,671. With a land area of 18,243.66 km^{2} (7,043.92 sq mi), it had a population density of 2.6/km^{2} (6.8/sq mi) in 2021.

Panethnic groups in the Strathcona Regional District (2001−2021)
Panethnic group	2021		2016		2011	
Panethnic group	Pop.	%	Pop.	%	Pop.	%
European (Note: Statistic includes all persons that did not make up part of a visible minority or an indigenous identity.)	38,790	82.04%	36,095	82.39%	36,455	85.74%
Indigenous	6,140	12.99%	5,855	13.36%	4,650	10.94%
Southeast Asian (Note: Statistic includes total responses of "Filipino" and "Southeast Asian" under visible minority section on census.)	760	1.61%	685	1.56%	630	1.48%
East Asian (Note: Statistic includes total responses of "Chinese", "Korean", and "Japanese" under visible minority section on census.)	580	1.23%	460	1.05%	240	0.56%
South Asian	540	1.14%	275	0.63%	150	0.35%
African	230	0.49%	165	0.38%	135	0.32%
Latin American	135	0.29%	150	0.34%	160	0.38%
Middle Eastern (Note: Statistic includes total responses of "West Asian" and "Arab" under visible minority section on census.)	15	0.03%	50	0.11%	15	0.04%
Other (Note: Statistic includes total responses of "Visible minority, n.i.e." and "Multiple visible minorities" under visible minority section on census.)	85	0.18%	80	0.18%	65	0.15%
Total responses	47,280	98.19%	43,810	98.07%	42,520	98.31%
Total population	48,150	100%	44,671	100%	43,252	100%

- Note: Totals greater than 100% due to multiple origin responses.

== Municipalities ==
Municipality	Government Type	Population (2016)
Campbell River	city	32,588
Gold River	village	1,212
Sayward	village	311
Tahsis	village	248
Zeballos	village	107

== Electoral areas and unincorporated communities ==
- Area A (Kyuquot/Nootka–Sayward)
  - Nootka Island
- Area B (Cortes Island)
  - Cortes Bay
  - Mansons Landing
  - Squirrel Cove
  - Whaletown
- Area C (Discovery Islands–Mainland Inlets)
  - Heriot Bay
  - Port Neville
  - Quathiaski Cove
  - Refuge Cove
- Area D (Oyster Bay–Buttle Lake)
  - Oyster Bay
