= Cape Sutil =

Headland in British Columbia, Canada

- Cape
- Location in British Columbia
- Coordinates: 50°52′35″N 128°3′6″W
- Location: Vancouver Island, British Columbia
- Offshore water bodies: Queen Charlotte Sound; Queen Charlotte Strait

Dimensions
  - Length: 1 km (0.62 mi)
  - Width: 0.5 km (0.31 mi)
- Topo map: NTS 102I16 Cape Scott

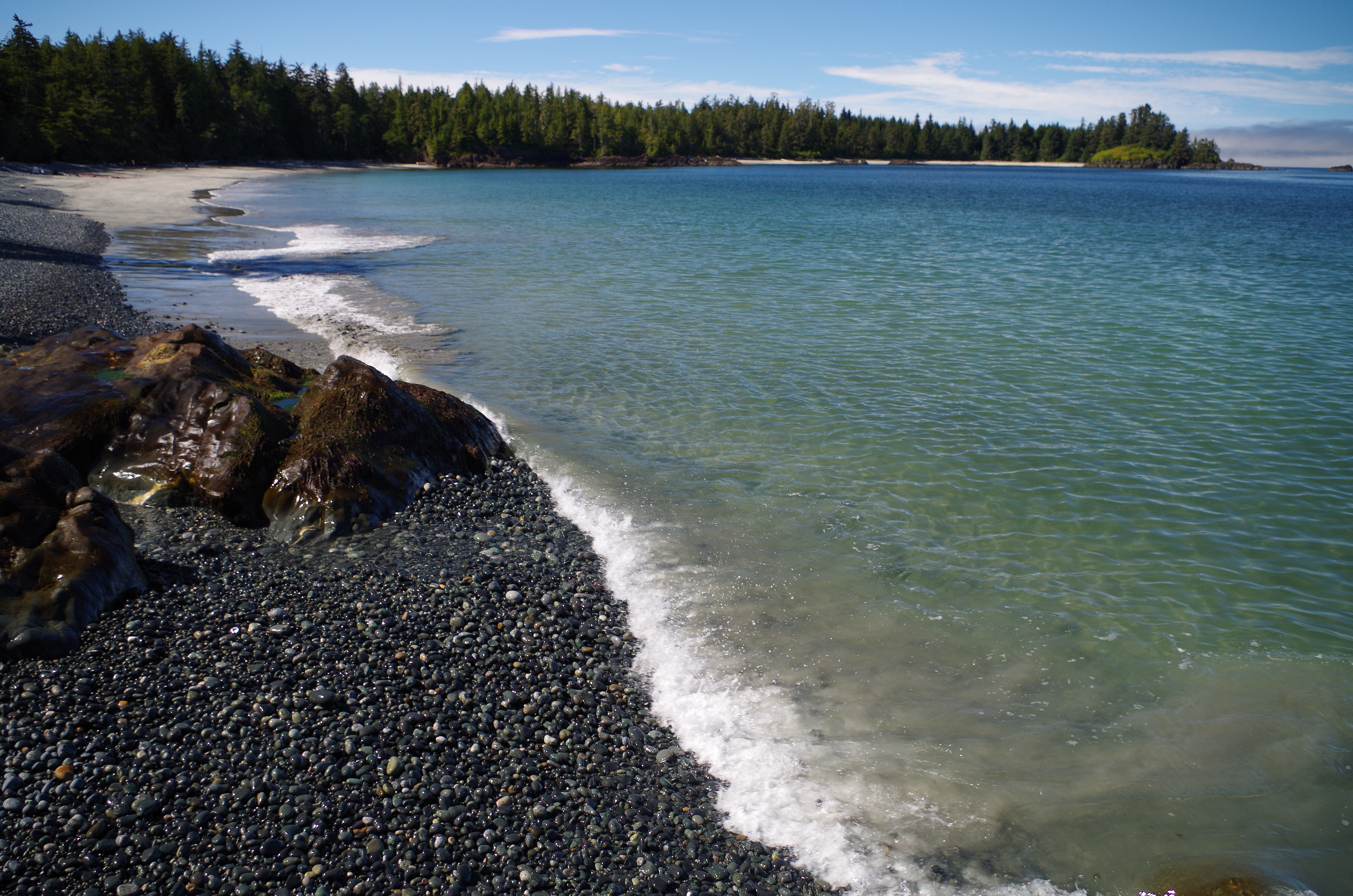

Cape Sutil is the headland at the northernmost point of Vancouver Island, in the Canadian Province of British Columbia.

== Toponymy ==
Cape Sutil was named in 1792 by Spanish explorers Dionisio Alcalá Galiano and Cayetano Valdés y Flores during their circumnavigation of Vancouver Island, done in partial cooperation with George Vancouver. The name refers to Galiano's goleta, Sutil.

In 1860 or 1862 George Henry Richards named the headland Cape Commerell. The name Sutil was restored by the Geographic Board of Canada in 1905 or 1906.

== Geography ==
Cape Sutil is the northernmost point of Vancouver Island. It is located at the western end of Goletas Channel near Hope Island. The westernmost point of Hope Island, Mexicana Point, was named for Cayetano Valdés's vessel, Mexicana. Goletas Channel was also named by Galiano and Valdés in 1792.

BC Geographical Names uses a line between Cape Sutil and Cape Caution to separate Queen Charlotte Sound and Queen Charlotte Strait.

== History ==
Nahwitti was a Kwakwakaʼwakw First Nation village located just east of Cape Sutil. It was a major trading site during the maritime fur trade era of approximately 1790 to 1850. Today it is an Indian reserve under the administration of the Kwakwakaʼwakw Tlatlasikwala Nation.

During the early 19th century Nahwitti was the principal town of the Nahwitti First Nation. It was one of the most popular sites for Western trading vessels on the Pacific Northwest coast, and the primary point of contact with the Kwakwakaʼwakw peoples. Hundreds of trading vessels, mostly British and American, visited during this time, mainly seeking sea otter skins to take to China, where they commanded a high price.

In 1850–1851 the village of Nahwitti was shelled and burned to the ground twice by the British Navy. Most of the inhabitants fled to Bull Harbour on Hope Island. The Nahwitti people called their new village on Hope Island "Meloopa". Many eventually relocated again to Alert Bay. The village site on Hope Island remains an Indian reserve called "Hope Island 1". Near the original village, on Cape Sutil, is a reserve called "Nahwitti 4".
