= Nahwitti River =

River in British Columbia, Canada

- Etymology: Nahwitti First Nation

Location
- Country: Canada
- Province: British Columbia
- District: Rupert Land District
- Region: Northern Vancouver Island

Physical characteristics
- Source
  - location: Nahwitti Mountain
  - coordinates: 50°41′24″N 127°41′29″W
  - elevation: 560 m (1,840 ft)
- Mouth
  - location: Goletas Channel
  - coordinates: 50°51′31″N 128°0′29″W
  - elevation: 0 m (0 ft)
- Length: 40 km (25 mi)
- Basin size: 229 km^{2} (88 sq mi)

The Nahwitti River is a 40-kilometre (25 mi) long river in northernmost Vancouver Island, British Columbia, Canada. It flows through Cape Scott Provincial Park into Goletas Channel near Hope Island and Queen Charlotte Sound. Its watershed, 229 km^{2} (88 sq mi) large, is located west and northwest of Port Hardy, north and northeast of Holberg, and north of Holberg Inlet, part of Quatsino Sound.

== Name origin ==
The name "Nahwitti" comes from the historic Kwakwakaʼwakw First Nation village of Nahwitti, which was an important trading site during the maritime fur trade era of approximately 1786–1850. The village was located near the mouth of the Nahwitti River. In 1850–1851 the village of Nahwitti was shelled and burned to the ground twice by the British Navy. Most of the inhabitants fled to Bull Harbour on Hope Island. Today they are part of the Tlatlasikwala Nation. Today the village is gone, but there remains on Cape Sutil an Indian reserve called "Nahwitti 4", under the administration of the Tlatlasikwala Nation.

== Course ==
The Nahwitti River originates about 14 kilometres (8.7 mi) west of Port Hardy, not far from Kains Lake and Nahwitti Mountain. It flows generally west to Nahwitti Lake. Joined on the way by numerous creeks, including Kains Creek, and Mead Creek. Then the Nahwitti passes through the Nahwitti River Recreation Site and enters Nahwitti Lake, after which it flows north and northwest. Just below Nahwitti Lake the river is joined by Hepler Creek, then, among various unnamed tributaries, Pugh Creek, Nahshutti Creek, Rannell Creek. Godkin Creek, and Tyllia Creek with its tributary Bragg Creek. Then the Nahwitti River enters Cape Scott Provincial Park and empties into Goletas Channel, part of Queen Charlotte Sound.

The First Nation Indian reserve called "Nahwitti 4" is located about 3.5 kilometres (2.2 mi) west of the river's mouth, on Cape Sutil, the northernmost point of Vancouver Island. Hope Island lies north of Goletas Channel. Within Goletas Channel is Nahwitti Bar.

== History ==
The Nahwitti River watershed is within the traditional territory of the Tlatlasikwala and Quatsino Kwakwakaʼwakw First Nations, which are part of the Kwakiutl District Council and the Winalagalis Treaty Group.

== Environment ==
A relatively large, if short river, the Nahwitti supports many fish species, including sockeye, kokanee, coho, pink, and chum salmon; cutthroat, steelhead, and rainbow trout; Dolly Varden char, brook trout, and others.

Much of the river's watershed is used for timber harvesting and lies within the Kingcome Timber Supply Area, which is part of the Port McNeill Forest District. About 23% of the watershed has been harvested, and about 32% of the remaining land is considered to not be harvestable. The main trees are western hemlock and western red cedar, with lesser amounts of yellow cedar and coastal lodgepole pine.

The lower Nahwitti River lies within the protected Cape Scott Provincial Park, through which runs the North Coast Trail wilderness hiking trail.

== See also ==
- List of rivers of British Columbia
