= Nahwitti (trading site) =

Coordinates: 50°52′N 128°3′W

Nahwitti was a Kwakwakaʼwakw First Nation village and a major trading site during the maritime fur trade era of approximately 1790 to 1850. Today it is an Indian reserve under the administration of the Kwakwakaʼwakw Tlatlasikwala Nation. It is located near the northern tip of Vancouver Island, at Cape Sutil on Queen Charlotte Sound, near Hope Island and the Nahwitti River, east of Cape Scott, and not far from historic Fort Rupert and modern Port Hardy.

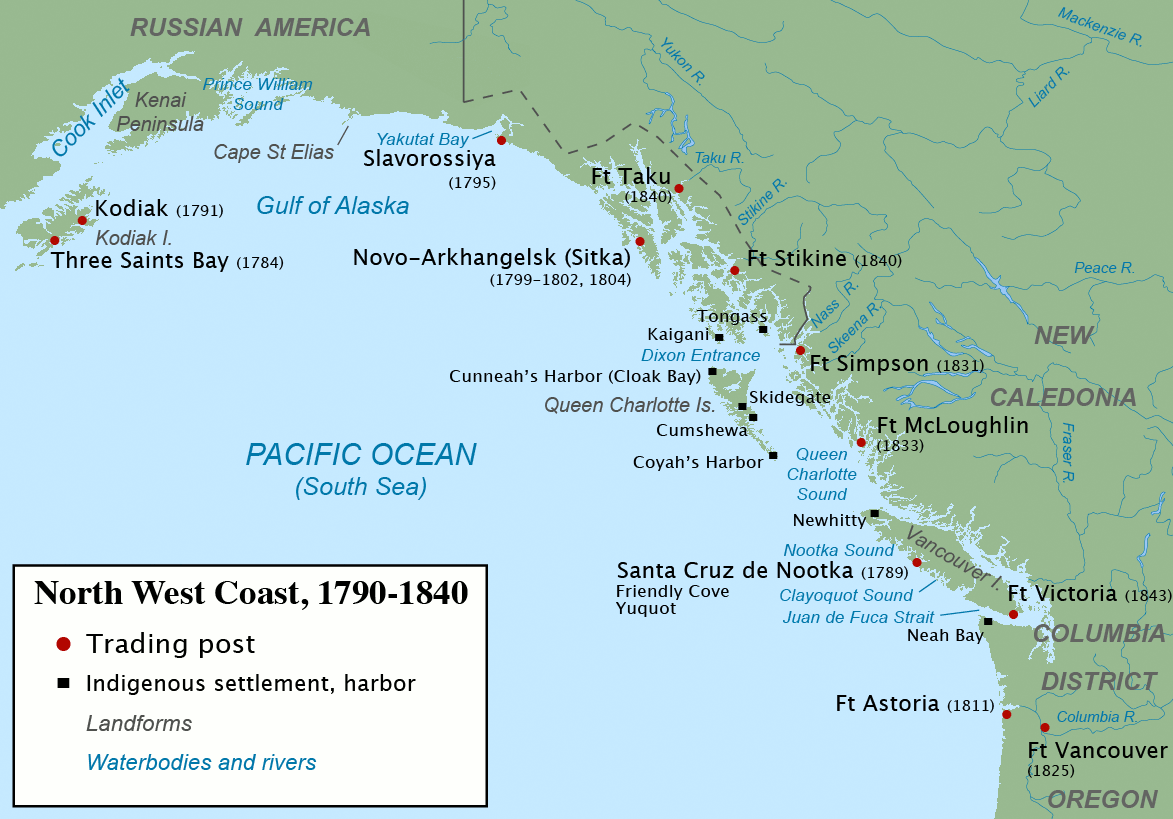
The North West Coast during the maritime fur trade era, about 1785 to 1850. Nahwitti is here spelled Newhitty, a common variant spelling.

During the early 19th century Nahwitti was the principal town of the Nahwitti First Nation. It was one of the most popular sites for Western trading vessels on the Pacific Northwest coast, and the primary point of contact with the Kwakwakaʼwakw peoples. Hundreds of trading vessels, mostly British and American, visited during this time, mainly seeking sea otter skins to take to China, where they commanded a high price.

Maritime fur traders and other early explorers spelled Nahwitti in many ways, including: Newitty, Newhitty, Newittee, Newitti, Nuwitti, Newetteo, Neuitie, Neu-wit-ties, New Whitty, New Witty, New Eity, Newettees, and others ways.

Among the first Westerners to visit the area was James Hanna, who visited Sea Otter Cove in 1786, and James Strange, who in 1786 explored Queen Charlotte Sound and made contact with the Kwakwakaʼwakw people on northern Vancouver Island. In 1792 Dionisio Alcalá Galiano stopped at Nahwitti during his circumnavigation of Vancouver Island. Also in 1792, Robert Gray of the Columbia Rediviva visited and traded in the area.

According to the Boston-based trader and merchant William F. Sturgis, regular American trade at Nahwitti began after a visit by captain Asa Dodge of the Alexander in 1800, who procured 600 sea otter skins at low prices. In the years following, Sturgis wrote, American trading vessels collected 1,500 to 2,000 skins annually at Nahwitti. The native population of Nahwitti was able to funnel almost all the Kwakwakaʼwakw trade through their port. In June 1805 six American ships gathered at Nahwitti during the aftermath of an attack on the Atahualpa at Milbanke Sound. They were the Juno, under John DeWolf, Vancouver, Lydia, Pearl, Mary, and Atahualpa. Two months later the Caroline visited Nahwitti and purchased 330 sea otter pelts, despite the very active trading season. American trading vessels continued to visit Nahwitti into the 1820s. During the 1810s and early 1820s the Pedler often wintered at Nahwitti. Other American ships that visited around 1820 include the Hamilton, Rob Roy, Mentor, Frederick, and Lascar.

In 1850–1851 the village of Nahwitti was shelled and burned to the ground twice by the British Navy. Most of the inhabitants fled to Bull Harbour on Hope Island. The Nahwitti people called their new village on Hope Island "Meloopa". Many eventually relocated again to Alert Bay. The village site on Hope Island remains an Indian reserve called "Hope Island 1". Near the original village, on Cape Sutil, is a reserve called "Nahwitti 4".

Around 1912–1913 the Nahwitti area attracted a number of European settlers. The population decimated by enlistments for World War I, only one elderly bachelor remained by 1921.

== See also ==
- List of Indian reserves in British Columbia
- List of Kwakwakaʼwakw villages
- List of historical ships in British Columbia
