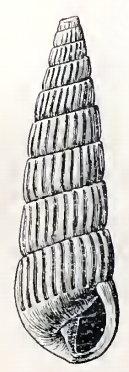
- Drawing of a shell of Turbonilla galianoi

Scientific classification
- Kingdom: Animalia
- Phylum: Mollusca
- Class: Gastropoda
- Family: Pyramidellidae
- Genus: Turbonilla
- Species: T. galianoi

Binomial name
- Turbonilla galianoi Dall & Bartsch, 1909

Synonyms
- Turbonilla stylina (Carpenter, 1864); Turbonilla (Strioturbonilla) galianoi Dall & Bartsch, 1909

= Turbonilla galianoi =

Species of gastropod

Turbonilla galianoi is a species of sea snail, a marine gastropod mollusk in the family Pyramidellidae, the pyrams and their allies.

This species was named for Dionisio Alcalá Galiano, the Spanish explorer of California

== Description ==
The milk-white, shining shell has an elongate-conic shape. Its length measures a little more than 6 mm. The 2½ whorls of the protoconch are very small. They form a rather elevated spire, having their axis at right angles to that of the succeeding turns, in the first of which they are about one-fourth immersed. The ten whorls of the teleoconch are well rounded, very strongly tabulately shouldered at the summit, ornamented with well-developed, rounded, slightly protractively curved axial ribs. Of these ribs, 16 occur upon the first, second, and third, 18 upon the fourth and fifth, 20 upon the sixth, 22 upon the seventh, 24 upon the eighth, 26 upon the ninth, and 28 upon the penultimate turn. These ribs extend equally strong from the summit to the periphery of the whorls. The intercostal spaces are not quite as wide as the ribs. They are well impressed, extending anteriorly to the suture. The sutures are strongly constricted. The periphery of the body whorl is well rounded. The base of the shell is rather long, and well rounded. The entire surface of the spire and the base is marked by exceedingly fine spiral striations. The aperture is subquadrate. The posterior angle is obtuse. The outer lip is thin, showing the external sculpture within. The columella is almost straight, and slightly revolute.

== Distribution ==
This species occurs in the Pacific Ocean off California.
