= Cape Scott (disambiguation) =

Cape Scott is in Victoria Land, Antarctica.

Cape Scott may also refer to:

- Cape Scott Provincial Park on Vancouver Island, Canada
- Cape Scott Lighthouse on Vancouver Island, Canada
- HMCS Cape Scott, a former Canadian warship
- Fleet Maintenance Facility Cape Scott, at Canadian Forces Base Halifax
