= Francisco Antonio Mourelle =

Spanish Galician naval officer and explorer

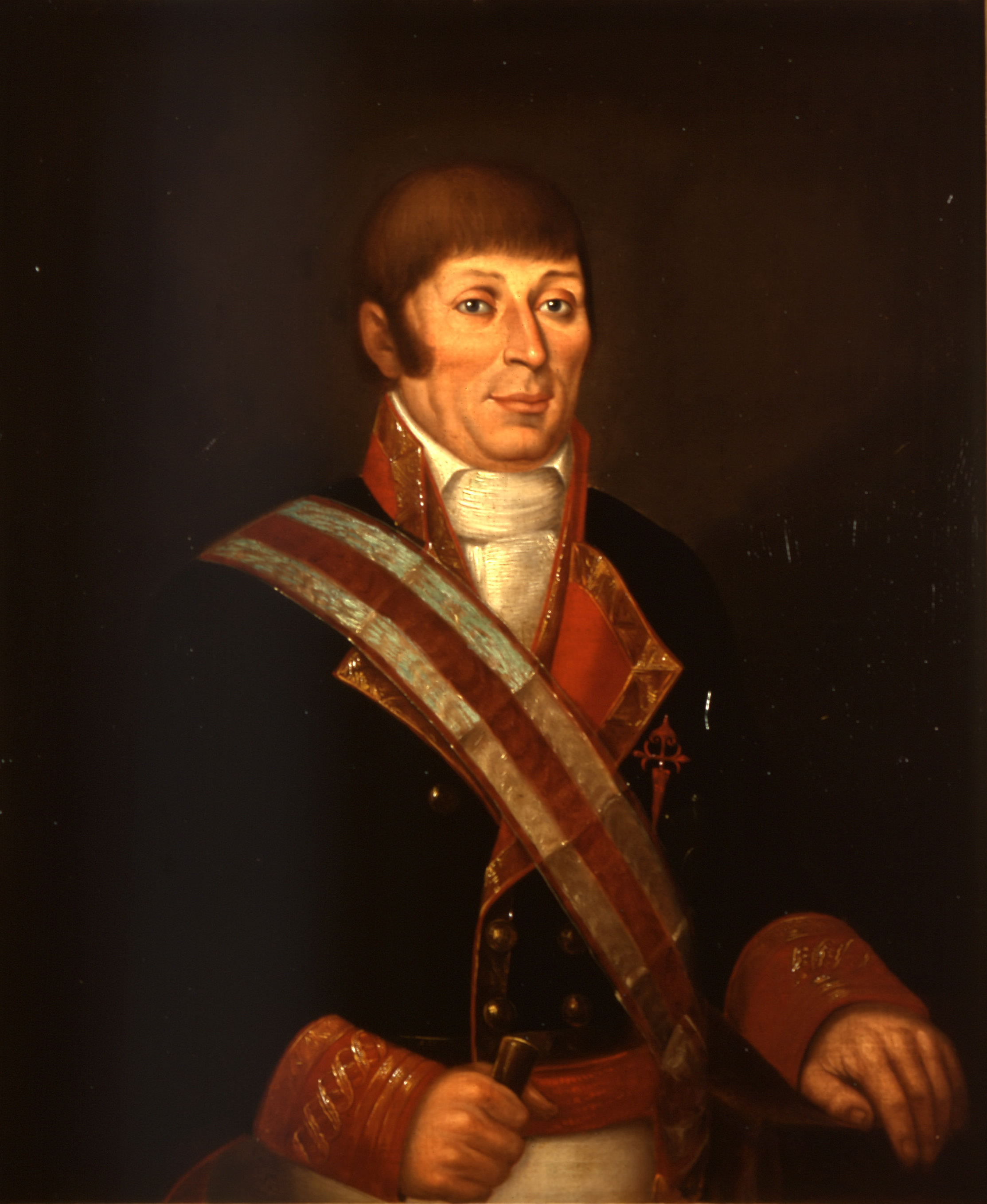
Francisco Antonio Mourelle

Francisco Antonio Mourelle de la Rúa (July 17, 1750 – May 24, 1820) was a Spanish Galician naval officer and explorer serving the Spanish crown. He was born in 1750 at San Adrián de Corme (Corme Aldea, Ponteceso), near A Coruña, Galicia.

== 1775 voyage ==
Mourelle served the Spanish navy in the Guyanas, Trinidad, and the Antilles before becoming stationed at New Spain's Pacific Ocean naval base at San Blas, Mexico in 1774. He joined the 1775 expedition of Bruno de Heceta and Juan Francisco de la Bodega y Quadra, serving as Quadra's pilot on the schooner Sonora. On July 29, at around 49 degrees north latitude, the Sonora became separated from Heceta's ship Santiago. Heceta soon returned south while Quadra and Mourelle continued north, eventually reaching 58 degrees 30 minutes north latitude. They found and anchored in Bucareli Bay. Then they sailed south, arriving at Monterey, California, on October 7, and San Blas on November 20, 1775.

Mourelle's journal was somehow taken clandestinely to London, where it was translated and published. Captain James Cook made use of the information in Mourelle's journal during his travels in the Pacific Northwest.

== 1779 voyage ==
Mourelle again served as the pilot of Quadra, and second in command of the ship Favorita, during the 1779 expedition commanded by Ignacio de Arteaga. Leaving San Blas on February 11, 1779, the expedition reached 61 degrees north and Hinchinbrook Island at the head of the Gulf of Alaska. From there they sailed southwest along the Kenai Peninsula. The ships returned to San Blas on November 21, 1779.

== Later career ==
During his service at San Blas, Mourelle traveled extensively throughout the Pacific Ocean. From 1781-1781 on the La Princessa, he attempted to find a southern route from the Philippines to Mexico, mapping 29 of the 50 islands in the Hermit Islands, Ninigo Islands and Tench Island in New Guinea, and Ontong Java in the same latitude as Solomon Islands. He visited Tonga and travelled through the Ellice Islands (now Tuvalu). Keith S. Chambers and Doug Munro (1980) identify Niutao as the island that Mourelle named on May 5, 1781, thus solving what Europeans had called The Mystery of Gran Cocal. Due to contrary winds, he returned via Guam and took the northern route across the Pacific to Mexico. He was also familiar with the Philippines and Canton, China.

Mourelle was to command the Mexicana for a 1792 voyage to explore the Strait of Georgia but Alessandro Malaspina had one of his own officers, Cayetano Valdés, placed in command of the Mexicana. Dionisio Alcalá Galiano commanded the Sutil, the twin companion of the Mexicana.

Mourelle was transferred to Spain in 1793. He was promoted to frigate captain in the same year as the action of 19 January 1799 where he took a leading role. He became ship's captain in 1806, and commodore in 1811. He commanded a squadron in 1818 that was to put down a rebellion in the Rio de la Plata, but the endeavor never got underway.

Mourelle died on May 24, 1820, at the age of 69.

== Legacy ==
Maurelle Island in the Discovery Islands of the South Coast of British Columbia, Canada, was named for him.
