= José Cardero =

Spanish draughtsman and artist

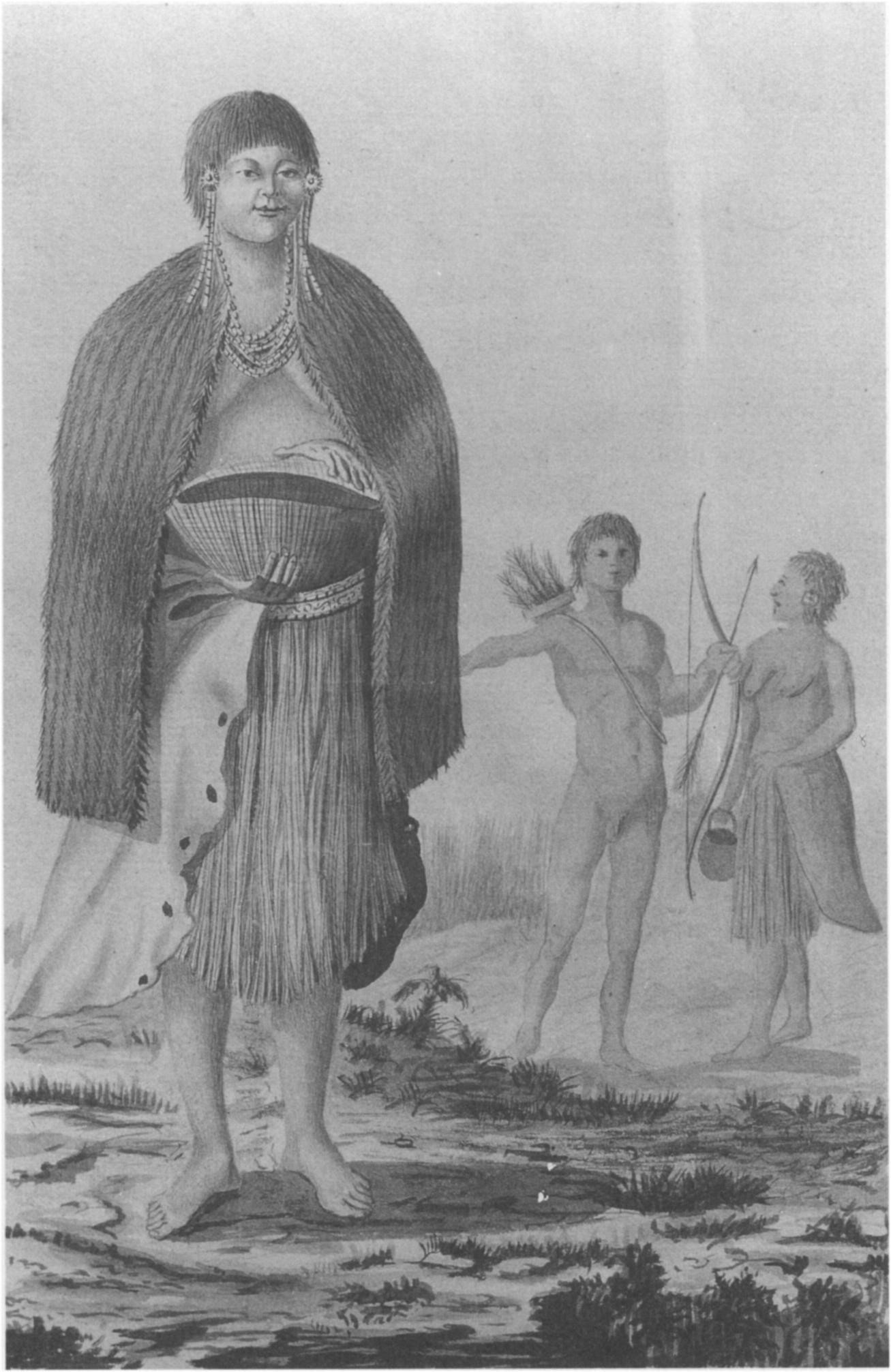
An Indian native of the Monterey, California area circa 1791 by Cardero.

José Cardero (also Josef Cardero, in full Manuel, José, (Josef, Joseph) Antonio Cardero) (1766 – after 1811) was a Spanish draughtsman and artist. He is most remembered for his work on the expedition of Alejandro Malaspina and the related expedition of Dionisio Alcalá Galiano. During the Galiano voyage Cordero Channel was named in his honor. Other places in British Columbia were later named in his honor as well, including Dibuxante Point, "dibuxante" being Spanish for "draughtsman".

== Biography ==
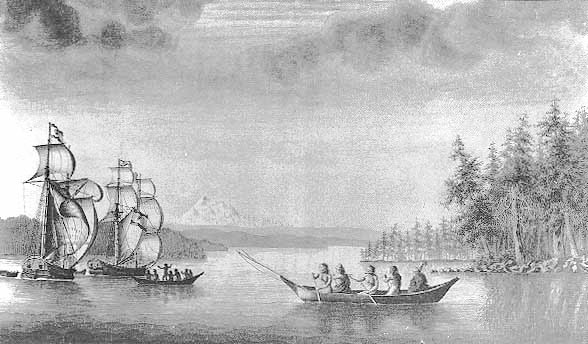
Ships Sutil and Mexicana, during the Dionisio Alcalá Galiano expedition made in 1792 in British Columbia (Canada). Drawing by Cardero

He was born in 1766 in Écija, Spain. Nothing is known about Cardero's life until he sailed with Malaspina in 1789. He was a member of the crew of Malaspina's corvette, the Descubierta, perhaps as a servant. He showed an aptitude for drawing early in the voyage and after Juan del Pozo Bauzá, one of the official artists, was discharged in Peru, Cardero began producing drawings regularly. In 1791, when the expedition was in Acapulco, New Spain (Mexico), Cardero was officially confirmed as an artist and map drawer of the expedition.

He sailed with Malaspina to Alaska, where he made many drawings of the Tlingit. After returning to Mexico Malaspina assigned him to serve as an artist on the expedition of Galiano and Cayetano Valdés, both officers of Malaspina's who were given ships and the task of exploring the Strait of Georgia. Cardero sailed on Valdés's ship, the Mexicana, in 1792. During the voyage the Spanish met and worked with George Vancouver, who was exploring the Strait of Georgia for the British. Both expeditions sailed around Vancouver Island.

Cardero's duties on the Galiano expedition included not only making drawings and fair copies of sketch maps, but serving in boat parties sent out to explore. After the voyage many of Cardero's drawings were copied and improved upon by other artists, especially the painter Fernando Brambila in Madrid. Brambila, who had never been to the Pacific Northwest, produced higher quality artwork but sometimes added unrealistic details.

After the Galiano voyage, Cardero returned to Spain and worked with Valdés and Malaspina briefly. In 1795 he was reassigned as a Ship Accountant in the Spanish Navy and sent to Cádiz. His name appears on a list of permanent officers of the navy from 1797 to 1811, after which there is no further mention of him in known records. The reason for the removal of his name from the list of officers in 1811 is not known.

== Legacy ==
Cordero Channel, originally Canal de Cardero, commemorates Jose Cardero. Cardero Street, in Vancouver's West End is named for the strait, and only as a result indirectly for Jose Cardero.

== See also ==
- Spanish expeditions to the Pacific Northwest
