= Descubierta and Atrevida =

18th-century Spanish Navy corvettes

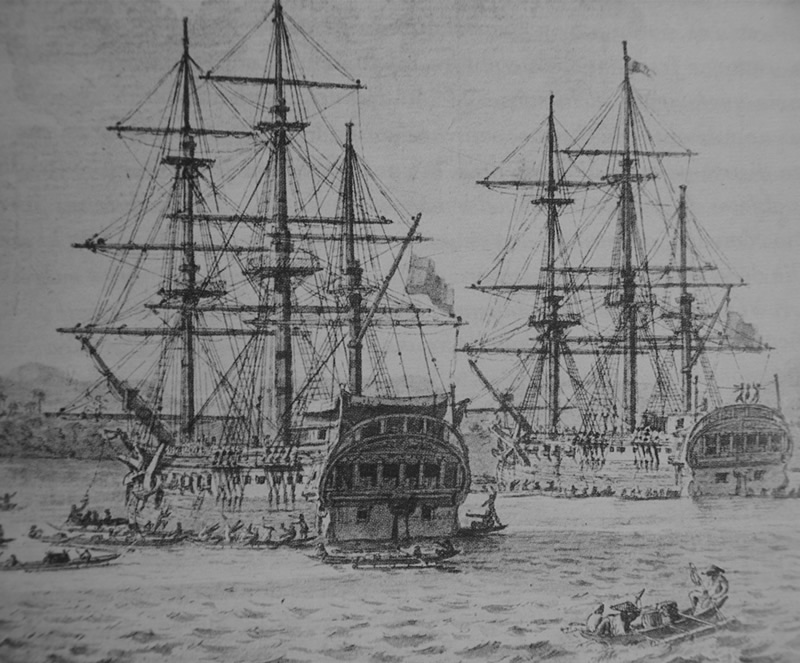
- The corvettes Descubierta and Atrevida; drawing by Fernando Brambila.

History

Spain
- Name: Descubierta and Atrevida
- Builder: Tómas Muñoz, La Carraca shipyard, Cádiz
- Launched: 8 April 1789

General characteristics
- Type: corvette
- Tons burthen: 306 toneladas
- Length: 33.3 m (109 ft 3 in)
- Beam: 8.7 m (28 ft 7 in)
- Depth of hold: 4.3 m (14 ft 1 in)
- Propulsion: Sail (three masts, ship rig)
- Complement: 104
- Armament: 14 × 6-pounder (2.7 kg) cannon, 2 × 4-pounder (1.8 kg) cannon

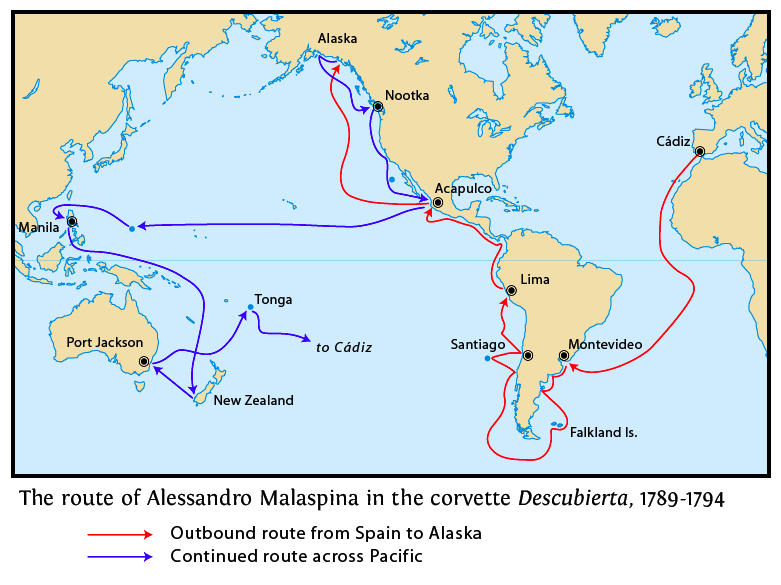
This map shows the route of Malaspina's ship Descubierta with the return to Spain from Tonga omitted. The route of Bustamante's Atrevida was mostly the same, but deviated in some places.

Descubierta and Atrevida were twin corvettes of the Spanish Navy, custom-designed as identical special exploration and scientific research vessels. They were built at the same time for the Malaspina Expedition. Under the command of Alejandro Malaspina (Descubierta) and José de Bustamante y Guerra (Atrevida) the two vessels sailed from Spain to the Pacific Ocean, conducting a thorough examination of the internal politics of the American Spanish Empire and the Philippines. They explored the coast of Alaska and worked to reinforce Spain's claim to the Pacific Northwest in the aftermath of the Nootka Crisis. After crossing the Pacific Ocean, the colonial government in the Philippines was examined. Exploration and diplomatic reconnaissance followed, with stops in Qing dynasty-era China, New Zealand, Australia, and Tonga.

Under Malaspina's supervision and according to his specifications, the Descubierta and Atrevida were constructed at the La Carraca shipyard in Cádiz by the shipbuilder Tómas Muñoz . Both vessels were 33.3 m (109 ft) long with a beam of 8.7 m (29 ft), a depth of hold of 4.3 m (14 ft), and a tonnage of 306 toneladas. The complement of both the Descubierta and the Atrevida was 104. Their armament consisted of fourteen 6-pounder and two 4-pounder cannons. They were launched together on 8 April 1789.

== Malaspina Expedition ==
Malaspina's expedition was the most important voyage of discovery dispatched by Spain in the 18th century. It had two primary goals, the first being to increase geographic and scientific knowledge in general, the second to check on the status of Spain's vast empire, especially along the west coast of North America, where the Russians and the British were expanding their influence. Modeled after the voyages of James Cook, the Malaspina expedition was conducted in a highly scientific manner. Numerous scientists from many fields were among the crew. Indigenous peoples, such as the Tlingit and Tongan, were studied by the expedition's ethnographers.

The Descubierta and Atrevida sailed from Cádiz on 30 July 1789, stopping first at Montevideo on the Río de la Plata, then sailing south along the coast of Patagonia and visiting the Falkland Islands (Islas Malvinas). After rounding Cape Horn the expedition stopped at several Chilean ports and surveyed the Juan Fernández Islands. The two corvettes sailed north separately, surveying and mapping the coast between Peru and Mexico, where they arrived at the end of March 1790.

In Mexico Malaspina received instructions from the Spanish king, Carlos IV requiring a change of plans. Instead of sailing to the Hawaiian Islands and the Kamchatka Peninsula, Malaspina was to sail to Alaska and survey the coast between Mount Saint Elias and Nootka Sound, on Vancouver Island, in order to prove or disprove the existence of a Northwest Passage supposedly located in that area. Accordingly, the two corvettes sailed from Acapulco on 1 May 1791, and arrived at Yakutat Bay by the end of June. Staying at Yakutat Bay for about a month, the scientists made detailed ethnographic studies of the local Tlingit people. Surveys along the coast of Alaska revealed no hint of the fabled Northwest Passage. On July 27 Malaspina and Bustamante headed south to Nootka Sound, arriving there on 12 August 1791. They remained at Nootka Sound for about a month. Detailed surveys were made of the area, while the ethnographers studied the Nuu-chah-nulth (Nootka) people.

Leaving Nootka Sound, Malaspina and Bustamante sailed the Descubierta and Atrevida south to Monterey, Alta California. There Malaspina learned from Juan Carrasco that an inland sea had been discovered near Nootka Sound. It was the Strait of Georgia. Malaspina knew that an exploration voyage had to be dispatched immediately. He gave two of his officers, Dionisio Alcalá Galiano and Cayetano Valdés y Flores, command of two newly constructed goletas (schooners or brigs), and instructed them to thoroughly explore the new discovery. Malaspina himself supervised the final construction and fitting out of the two goletas, called the Sutil and the Mexicana.

The Malaspina expedition crossed the Pacific Ocean, from Acapulco to Manila in the Philippines, by way of the Mariana Islands. Coastal surveys were done and a side-trip to Macao was made. Then the two corvettes sailed southwest, landing at Espiritu Santo in the New Hebrides, then continuing on to southern New Zealand. After a visit to Dusky Sound, previously explored by Cook, the Spaniards explored Doubtful Sound, which no European had visited before.

From New Zealand the expedition sailed west to Port Jackson, Australia (today part of Sydney). They arrived in March 1793, about five years after the British first colonized Australia. The Malaspina expedition stayed for about a month. Relations with the British colonists were warm and friendly. The Spanish conducted scientific experiments, including astronomical and hydrographic observations, and the collection of many specimens of flora, fauna, and minerals. They also observed the British settlement, taking special note of any potential threat to Spanish interests in the Pacific. Malaspina was concerned that the increasing British presence in the Pacific might jeopardize Spanish trade between the Americas and the Philippines, which the Manila galleons had carried out for over two centuries with virtually no outside interference.

The Spanish corvettes left Port Jackson on 11 April 1793 and sailed northeast to Tonga, then known as the Friendly Islands. Cook had visited the southern Tongan islands in 1773. Malaspina opted to visit the northern archipelago now known as Vavaʻu. After the stay in Tonga the expedition sailed to Peru, then back around Cape Horn and on to Spain, arriving in Cádiz on 21 September 1793 after a voyage of over four years.

== Aftermath ==
In Spain, Malaspina's involvement in a conspiracy to overthrow the government culminated in his arrest, imprisonment, and eventually banishment. Most of the material collected by the expedition was put away and did not see the light of day again until late in the 20th century.

== See also ==
- List of historical ships in British Columbia
- Descubierta-class corvette
- European and American voyages of scientific exploration
