= Action of 19 January 1799 =

Battle of the French Revolutionary Wars

- Part of the French Revolutionary Wars
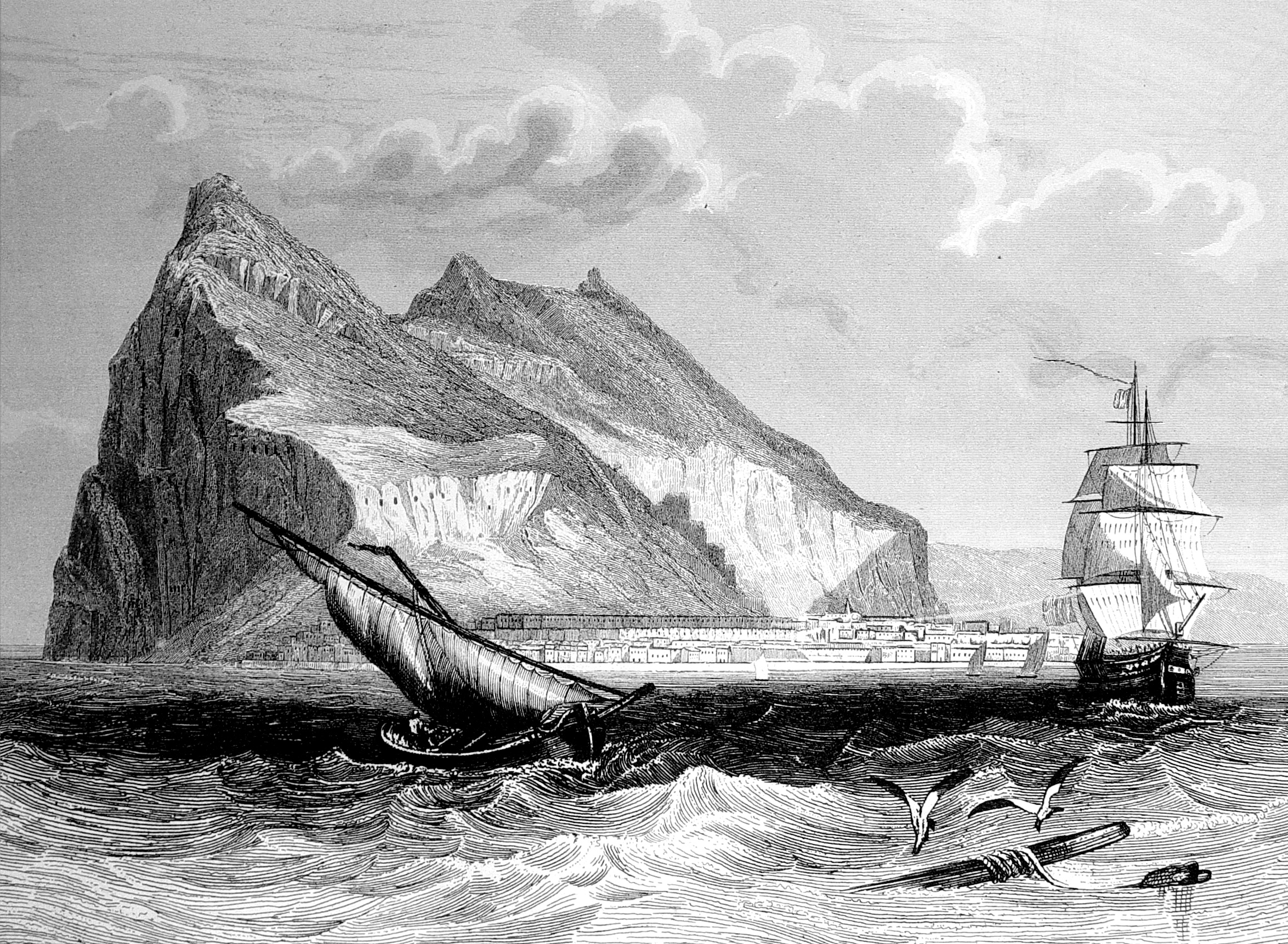
- Engraving of Gibraltar as seen from the north, depicting the view as seen in 1852.
Date	19 January 1799
Location	Off Punta Europa, Strait of Gibraltar
Result	Spanish victory

Belligerents
Great Britain	Spain

Commanders and leaders
Unknown	Mourelle de la Rúa

Strength
1 third-rate, 1 gun-brig, 3 gunboats, 4 merchant ships, 3 merchant brigs	1 mistico, 14 gunboats

Casualties and losses
1 gunboat sunk, 1 merchant ship captured, 2 merchant brigs captured, 1 gunboat captured, 120 prisoners	Minor

The action of 19 January 1799 was a minor naval battle of the French Revolutionary Wars fought in waters of the Strait of Gibraltar, off Punta Europa. A Spanish squadron of 14 gunboats with a mistico as flagship, commanded by Francisco Mourelle de la Rua, attacked a British merchant convoy escorted by several Royal Navy warships, among them a 74-gun ship of the line. The British warships failed to defend the convoy, losing a gunboat sunk and another captured. The convoy also lost a ship and two brigs. For this action Mourelle de la Rua was promoted to frigate captain.

== Background ==
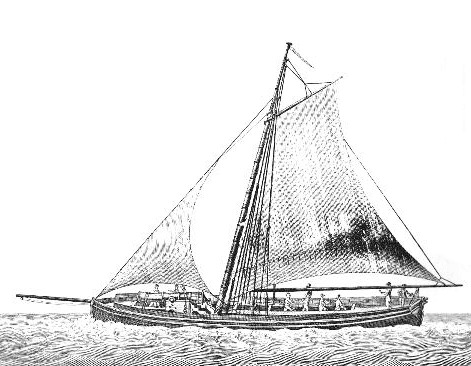
Engraving of a Spanish gunboat of the late 18th century.

Once the Spanish Navy realized how useful gunboats could be in naval warfare, they established a base for them at Algeciras. The deployment had two objectives: first, impede British naval trade with Gibraltar and second, protect Spain's own commerce.

During the Great Siege of Gibraltar Admiral Antonio Barceló commanded the naval forces responsible for blockading the bay that included a fleet of several xebecs and gunboats. One of his successors was Francisco Antonio Mourelle de la Rua, who was appointed to Algeciras in 1797 and took part in more than 41 actions against the British.

== Action - the Spanish account ==
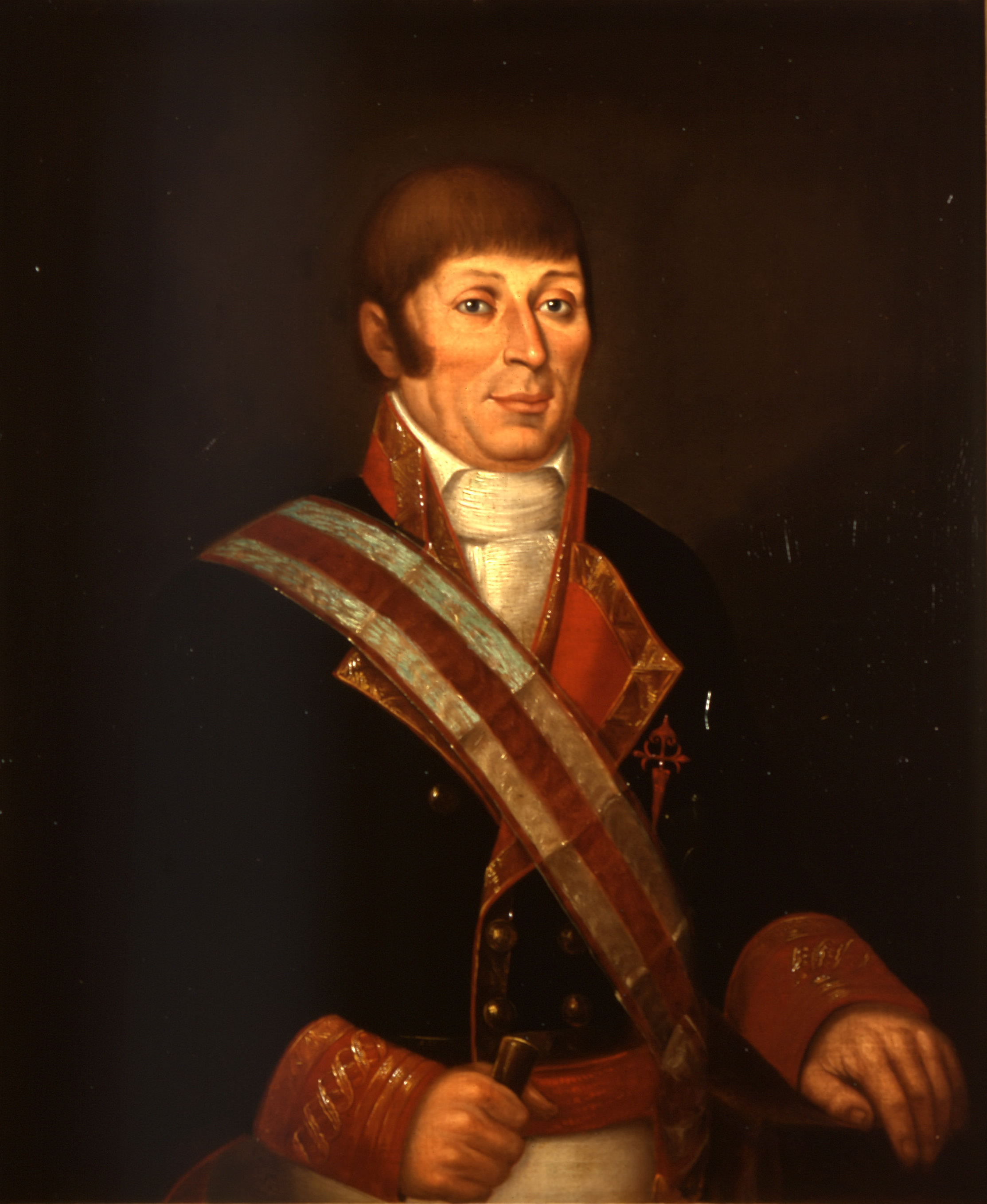
Portrait of Mourelle de la Rua.

At 2 PM on 19 January 1799 a British merchant convoy consisting of four ships and three brigs sailed from Gibraltar escorted by a 74-gun ship of the line and an 18-gun brig of the Royal Navy. As they left Gibraltar, three gunboats accompanied them out of the bay to defend them against the Spanish gunboats based in Algeciras. Fourteen of them and a místico under Lieutenant Francisco Antonio Murelle de la Rua sailed an hour later to intercept the convoy, forming a line of battle, while four remained in reserve and two were dispatched to Punta Europa to attack the rear of the convoy.

After several hours of harassment, at 7:30 PM, Mourelle managed to cut off a ship and two brigs from the rest of the convoy. The three British gunboats immediately came to their assistance. One of the British gunboats sank and the remaining ones were captured, along with the merchant vessels. Gunfire from the British shore batteries of Punta Europa and the unexpected sally of seven boats from Gibraltar allowed one of the prizes to escape, though the Spanish were able to fend off the counterattack.

== Action - The British account ==
In the afternoon of 19 January, HMS Strombolo, a gunboat armed with one gun and under the command of Lieutenant William Davies, sailed to cover the departure of a convoy. She towed Transport 55 clear of the mole at Gibraltar and then returned to bring out another vessel. The activity drew the attention of the Spanish, who sent out a flotilla of gunboats and launches. Strombolo cast off her tow and moved to intercept the Spanish. Eight Spanish vessels surrounded her and in the exchange of fire, a Spanish cannonball holed Strombolo at the larboard bow. She rapidly filled with water so the crew abandoned her; the Spanish picked them up from the water.

The second British gunboat lost that day was HMS Wilkin, under the command of Lieutenant Henry Power. She had towed the Esther clear of the mole when the Spanish gunboats approached. She too sailed to meet them and too found herself surrounded by eight gunboats and launches. Her long gun misfired so the crew was reduced to using small arms to defend themselves. In the short engagement Wilkin lost her main topmast and mizzenmast. When the several Spanish boats came alongside, she struck her colours.

== Aftermath ==
Shortly thereafter, the Spanish squadron entered Algeciras towing the four prizes with 120 prisoners, among them the commander of the British gunboats of Gibraltar. None of the later British countermeasures to beat the Spanish gunboats, which included the use of grapeshot from a distance, had any effect. The Spanish gunboats proved their worth in subsequent years when they defended two major merchant convoys.
