= Goletas Channel =

- Location of Goletas ChannelRennell Sound
- Location: British Columbia, Canada
- Coordinates: 50°50′32″N 127°44′29″W
- Type: Channel
- Ocean/sea sources: Pacific Ocean

Goletas Channel is a channel and strait on the north side of Vancouver Island in British Columbia, Canada. It separates Vancouver Island from Hope Island and Nigei Island, located just east of Cape Sutil, the northernmost point of Vancouver Island. The waters of Goletas Channel are part of northern Queen Charlotte Strait.

The Nahwitti River empties into the western end of Goletas Channel, near the site of the historic Kwakwakaʼwakw village and maritime fur trade harbor known as Nahwitti.

Goletas Channel was named by the Spanish naval officers Dionisio Alcalá Galiano and Cayetano Valdés y Flores during their 1792 voyage around Vancouver Island, after their goletas (a Spanish term approximately equivalent to English "schooner"), Sutil and Mexicana. The channel was labeled Salida de las Goletas on their chart, published in 1793.
