= Spanish schooner Mexicana =

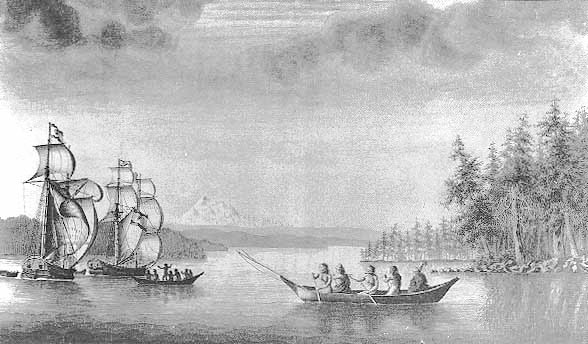
- The Mexicana (left, following) and Sutil (right, leading) during the 1792 voyage around Vancouver Island, drawn by José Cardero. Galiano's pennant flies from the mainmast of the Sutil. The Mexicana is spilling the wind from her sails to slow the ship. Mount Baker is in the background.

History

Spain
- Name: Mexicana
- Ordered: 1791
- Builder: Manuel Bastarrachea, San Blas shipyard, New Spain
- Cost: 10,513 pesos (1791)
- Laid down: 27 March 1791
- Launched: 21 May 1791

General characteristics
- Type: goleta (modified topsail schooner-brig)
- Tons burthen: 33 toneladas
- Length: 14 m (45 ft 11 in)
- Beam: 3.69 m (12 ft 1 in)
- Draft: 1.58 m (5 ft 2 in) forward; 1.72 m (5.6 ft) aft
- Depth of hold: 2.32 m (7.6 ft)
- Propulsion: Sails, oars
- Sail plan: Modified topsail schooner-brig rigged on two masts
- Complement: 21 officers, crew, servant, and artist

Mexicana was a topsail schooner (Spanish goleta) built in 1791 by the Spanish Navy at San Blas, New Spain. It was nearly identical to the Sutil, also built at San Blas later in 1791. Both vessels were built for exploring the newly discovered Strait of Georgia, carried out in 1792 under Dionisio Alcalá Galiano, on the Sutil, and Cayetano Valdés y Flores, on the Mexicana. During this voyage the two Spanish vessels encountered the two British vessels under George Vancouver, HMS Discovery and Chatham, which were also engaged in exploring the Strait of Georgia. The two expeditions cooperated in surveying the complex channels between the Strait of Georgia and Queen Charlotte Strait, in the process proving the insularity of Vancouver Island. After this first voyage the Mexicana continued to serve the San Blas Naval Department, making various voyages to Alta California and the Pacific Northwest coast.

== Construction ==
To meet the need for additional ships following the 1789 Nootka Crisis, Juan Francisco de la Bodega y Quadra, commandant of the San Blas Naval Base, augmented his small fleet. Four new vessels built, the schooners Valdés and Activa, and the twin schooners Mexicana and Sutil. Construction of the Mexicana began on 27 March 1791, under the direction of the shipyard constructor Manuel Bastarrachea and according to Bodega y Quadra's specifications. The Mexicana was launched on 21 May 1791.

The Mexicana was 14 m (46 ft) long with a beam of 3.6 m (12 ft), a depth of hold of 1.4 m (4.6 ft), and a tonnage of 33 toneladas. The vessel's draft was 1.58 m (5.2 ft), forward, and 1.72 m (5.6 ft) aft. The keel's length was 13 m (43 ft).

Although the Spanish word goleta is usually translated as schooner, the rigging of the Mexicana was changed a number of times, from a topsail schooner to a modified brig and other variations. In addition to a set of fore-and-aft sails the Mexicana carried main-mast and fore-mast courses, topsails, and staysails. The vessel also carried spanker, jib, and flying jib sails.

== Career ==
In late 1790 Alejandro Malaspina arrived in Acapulco. He sailed to Alaska and Nootka Sound, then returned to Acapulco. On the return voyage he met Juan Carrasco and heard about the discovery of the Strait of Georgia in July 1791. Malaspina knew it was vital that another expedition be dispatched to explore the Strait of Georgia more fully. Malaspina's corvettes, Descubierta and Atrevida, were unsuitable and not available, since they were to sail to the Philippines. Once back at Acapulco, Malaspina discovered that the Viceroy of New Spain, the Count of Revillagigedo, was already preparing to send another exploration voyage to the Strait of Juan de Fuca. He had assigned the newly finished Mexicana, under Francisco Antonio Mourelle, to the task. Malaspina proposed sending the Sutil as well, which was under construction at San Blas, and also that instead of sending Mourelle two of his own officers, Galiano and Valdés, should be given the assignment.

On the suggestion of Malaspina, and acceptance of Viceroy Revillagigedo, Mourelle, who had been given command of the Mexicana was replaced with one of Malaspina's officers, Cayetano Valdés y Flores, while another, Dionisio Alcalá Galiano, was given command of the newly built Sutil. Both were capitanes de fragata (Frigate Captains). Galiano was given overall command of the expedition. Additional personnel from the Malaspina Expedition were assigned as well. Secundino Salamanca and Juan Vernacci were made second in command of each vessel. José Cardero was also detached and assigned to the Mexicana. The Mexicana had a complement of 21, including two commissioned officers, one soldier, three petty officers and tradesmen, seven seaman gunners, six seamen, one servant, and the artist José Cardero.

The Sutil and Mexicana were transferred to Acapulco in late December 1791 where they were fitted out for exploration under Malaspina's supervision. Both vessels handled poorly. There were many defects in their construction and both required strengthening. Carpenters made various fixes and alterations in Acapulco, but the vessels were still defective and further alterations later were made at Nootka Sound.

They sailed from Acapulco on 8 March 1792 and arrived at the Spanish post at Nootka Sound, on the west coast of Vancouver Island, on 12 May 1792. On April 14, far from land, the Mexicana broke its mainmast. A rough and partial repair was made at sea, allowing the expedition to continue. Both the Sutil and the Mexicana were refitted and repaired at Nootka with the help of Bodega y Quadra, who had been assigned commandant at Nootka. Among other things, the Mexicana was fitted with a new mainmast and foremast. To repair the vessels Bodega y Quadra had them hauled into a small cove the Spanish called Caleta de Santa Cruz or Campo Santo.

In early June the two vessels entered the Strait of Juan de Fuca and made their way through the San Juan Islands and into the Strait of Georgia. Near the mouth of the Fraser River the Spaniards encountered the two ships of the Vancouver Expedition, which were also engaged in exploring the same area. The two expeditions shared information and sailed together for a while. They parted ways in the Discovery Islands and returned to Nootka Sound separately. Vancouver returned via Discovery Passage while Galiano and Valdés sailed via Cordero Channel. After arriving at Nootka Sound, the Sutil and Mexicana returned to San Blas, arriving there on 25 November 1792.

Vancouver, who had plenty of opportunity to examine the Sutil and Mexicana, wrote about them critically. He was "astonished" that such vessels "were employed to execute a service of such a nature". And that the vessels' "apartments just allowed room for sleeping places on each side, with a table in the intermediate place, at which four persons, with some difficulty, could sit, and were, in all other respects, the most ill calculated and unfit vessels which could possibly be imagined for such an expedition."

After the voyage of Galiano and Valdés, both the Mexicana and Sutil continued to serve the San Blas Naval Department for some years. In 1793 the Mexicana sailed north to explore the Columbia River and determine whether its mouth would be a good place for a new Spanish base. Under Juan Martínez y Zayas, the Mexicana sailed first to Neah Bay on the south coast of the Strait of Juan de Fuca, where the Activa was supposed to rendezvous but failed to arrive. So the Mexicana went south to the mouth of the Columbia River and entered. Due to the dangerous bar it was determined an unsuitable place for a base.

The Sutil was at Nootka Sound in 1796. The Mexicana might have been at Nootka in 1797.

== See also ==
- List of historical ships in British Columbia
