= Queen Charlotte Channel =

Strait between Bowen Island and West Vancouver

Coordinates: 49°22′39″N 123°18′24″W

- Location of Queen Charlotte Channel in Metro Vancouver
- Type: Strait
- Part of: Salish Sea
- Basin countries: Canada
- Max. length: 3–5 km (1.9–3.1 mi)
- Max. width: 9 km (5.6 mi)
- Frozen: Never
- Settlements: West Vancouver; Bowen Island

Queen Charlotte Channel forms the southern entrance to Howe Sound, British Columbia, Canada, between Bowen Island and West Vancouver.

Queen Charlotte Channel is approximately 9 km long, and varies between 3 km and 5 km wide. The channel borders on to Strait of Georgia to the south (marked by the small Passage Island). And it borders on Howe Sound to the north (at the southernmost tip of Bowyer Island).

The channel was named after the Royal Navy ship HMS Queen Charlotte, which was itself named after Queen Charlotte.

== See also ==
- Queen Charlotte Sound (Canada)
- Queen Charlotte Strait
- Royal eponyms in Canada
