= Cape Scott Lighthouse =

Lighthouse in British Columbia, Canada

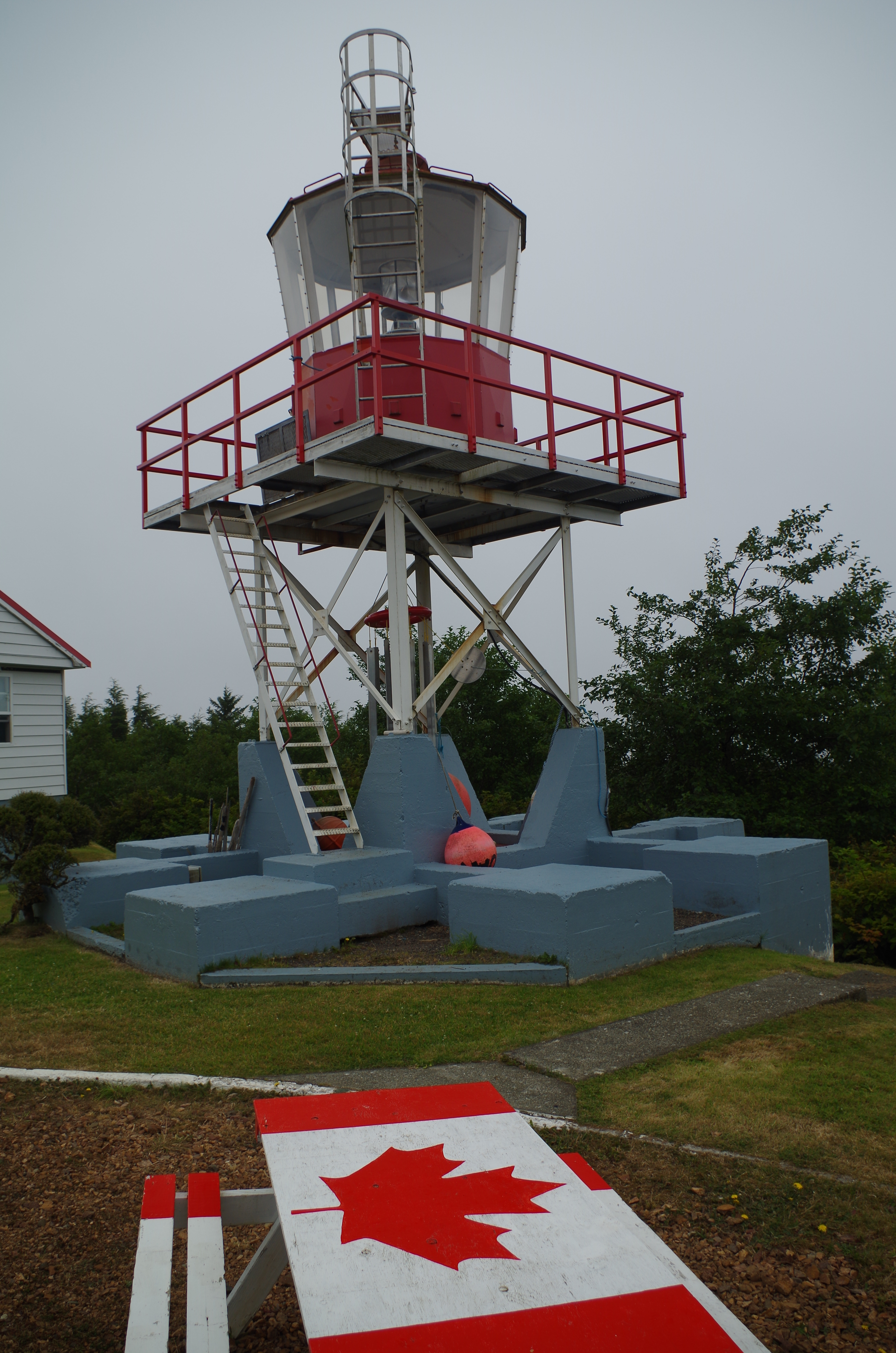
- Cape Scott Lighthouse
- Location: Cape Scott Provincial Park; British Columbia; Canada
- Coordinates: 50°46′57″N 128°25′38″W

Tower
- Constructed: 1927 (first)
- Foundation: concrete pillars
- Construction: steel skeletal tower
- Height: 9 metres (30 ft)
- Shape: square tower with balcony and lantern
- Markings: white tower, red balcony and lantern
- Operator: Canadian Coast Guard

Light
- First lit: 1981 (current)
- Focal height: 70 metres (230 ft)
- Lens: first-order Fresnel lens
- Light source: diesel electric generator
- Range: 19 nmi (35 km; 22 mi)
- Characteristic: Fl W 10s.

Cape Scott Lighthouse is at the northwestern extremity of Vancouver Island, British Columbia.

== Initial presence ==
A Danish-Canadian community existed east of Cape Scott from 1897, but numbers had dwindled by the mid-1910s. The community apparently maintained a stake light and lantern at the cape for a period. However, the practice had long ceased by the time the first official navigational aid was constructed in 1927. This red lantern, fitted to a wooden mast, comprised an unwatched acetylene gas light.

== Radar installation ==
During World War II, the Royal Canadian Air Force erected a radar tower near the point, and a camp in the woods immediately east of the Guise Bay neck. Connected by a plank and sand road, the facility became operational in February 1943. The contingent of up to 70 military personnel relied upon a weekly supply ship, which offloaded into rowboats for transport to shore. Parachute drops were used in emergencies. A landline was established to Coal Harbour. In September 1945, the electronic equipment was removed and the station disbanded. The Department of National Defence remains owner of the property.

== Light tower ==
In 1959, a light tower was built upon the concrete foundation of the former radar tower with a DCB 36 beacon, and the diesel generators providing electricity were housed in the former operator shack. Three dwellings for keepers were built nearby. In 1981, a new tower was erected with AGA PRB 21 model panels of sealed beams. By 2019, solar panels replaced the diesel generators. Operated by the Canadian Coast Guard, the lighthouse is one of the few that has not been automated. Although hikers visit the lighthouse location, the trails are unofficial, and their use is discouraged.

== Principal keepers ==
- William Edward Gardiner 1960–1964
- Arthur G. Walden 1964–1968
- Anthony Holland 1968–1969
- Don DeRousie 1971–1972
- Robert W. Noble 1972–1973
- Don Weeden 1973–1992
- Mike Higgins 1996–1997
- Glenn Borgens 1998–1999
- Roger Williamson 2001–2002
- Mike Higgins 2002–2003
- Calvin Martin 2003–2004
- Harvey Humchitt 2004–present

== Placards ==
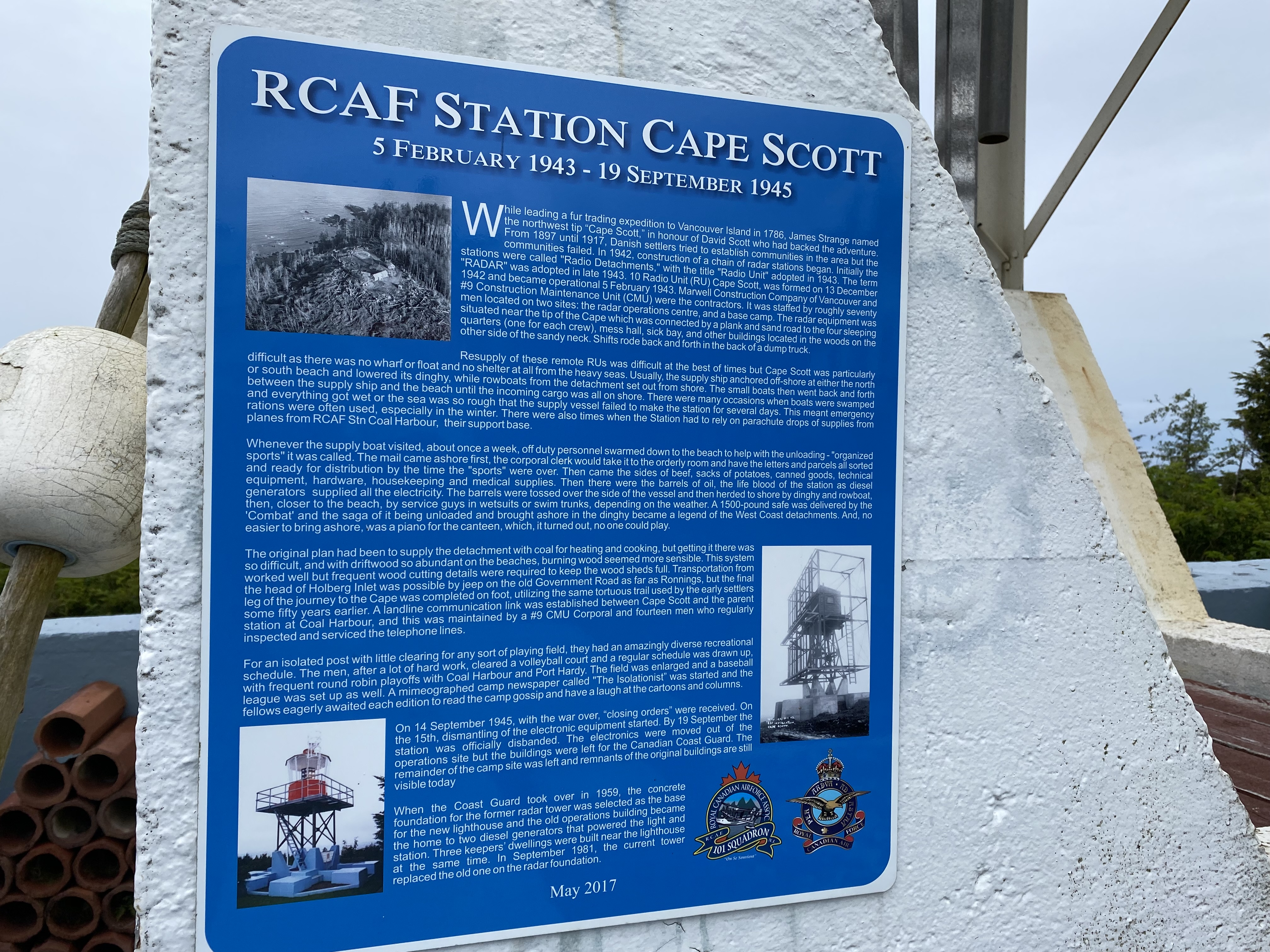
Placard at base of lighthouse

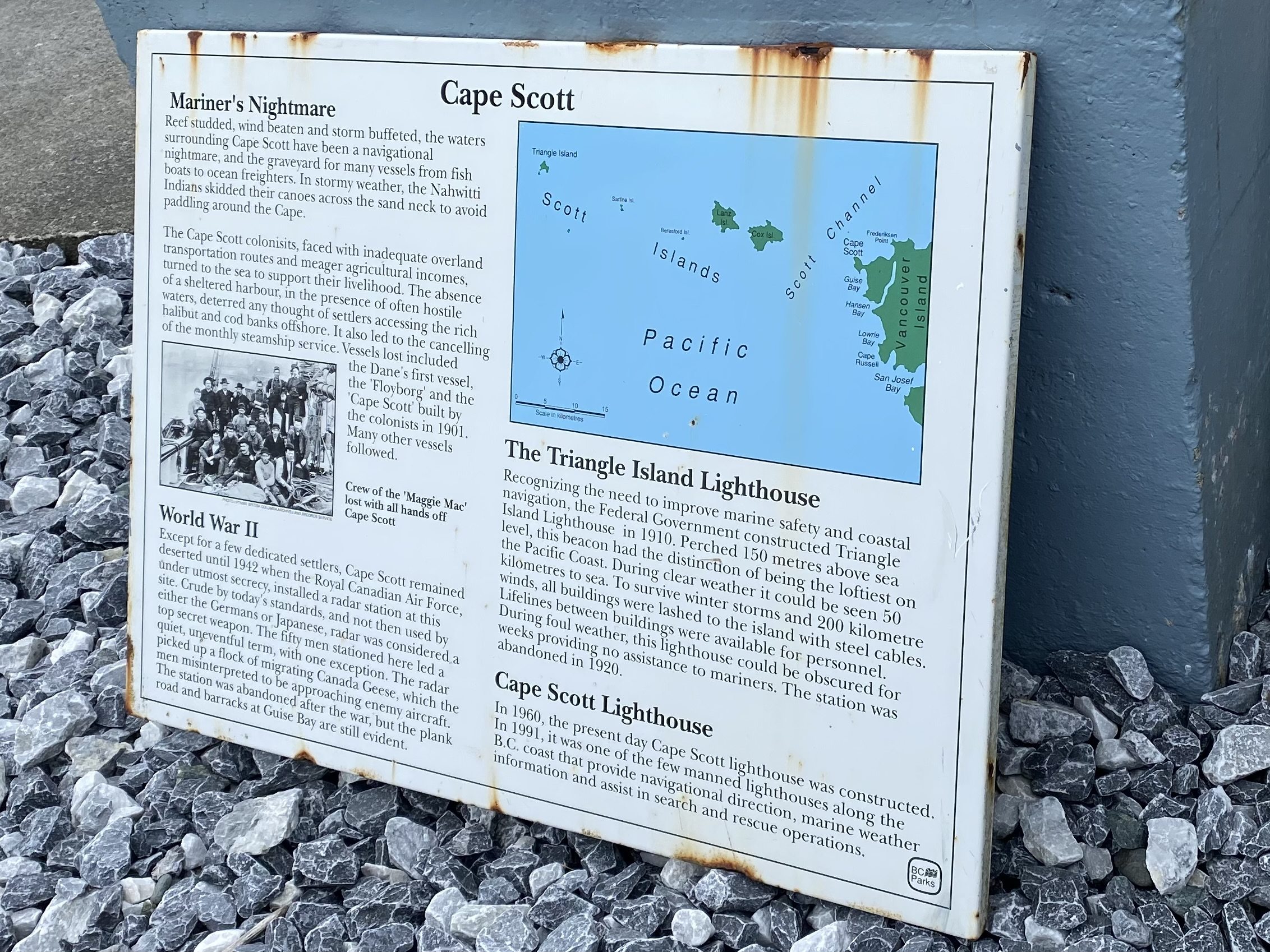
Cape Scott placard at the base of lighthouse

== See also ==
- List of lighthouses in British Columbia
- List of lighthouses in Canada
- Cape Caution
