= Queen Charlotte Sound (Canada) =

Sound of the Pacific Ocean in British Columbia, Canada

- French: Bassin de la Reine-Charlotte
- Location within British Columbia

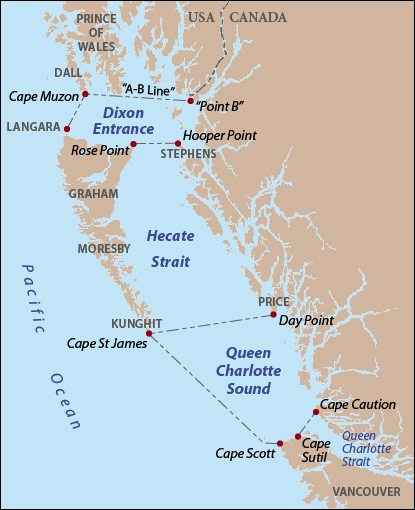
- Queen Charlotte Sound as delineated by BCGNIS, along with Hecate Strait and Dixon Entrance. Red dots indicate capes and points, grey text indicates island names.
- Location: British Columbia, Canada
- Coordinates: 51°30′N 129°00′W
- Ocean/sea sources: Pacific Ocean
- Max. length: 200 km (120 mi)
- Max. width: 135 km (84 mi)

Queen Charlotte Sound (French: Bassin de la Reine-Charlotte) is a sound of the Pacific Ocean in British Columbia, Canada, between Vancouver Island in the south and Haida Gwaii in the north. It merges with the Hecate Strait in the north and the Queen Charlotte Strait in the south.

Queen Charlotte Sound is part of the Inside Passage shipping route. It is part of the Haíɫzaqv Nation territory and Heiltsuk Nation.

== Definition ==
According to the BCGNIS, the northern boundary of Queen Charlotte Sound is defined as a line running from the southernmost point of Price Island to Cape St James on Kunghit Island, the southernmost point of Haida Gwaii. The western boundary is a line from Cape St James to Cape Scott at the north end of Vancouver Island. The southern boundary runs along the coast of Vancouver Island from Cape Scott to Cape Sutil, then to Cape Caution on the mainland. An older definition placed the northern boundary as a line from the southernmost point of Aristazabal Island to Cape St James.

== History ==
Queen Charlotte Sound was named by the British maritime fur trader James Charles Stuart Strange on August 5, 1786, in honour of Queen Charlotte of Great Britain. Strange had begun a fur trading expedition in 1785 which consisted of two vessels, Captain Cook under Captain Henry Lawrie and Experiment under Captain John Guise. During a boat excursion up Goletas Channel Strange saw an opening ahead and named it Queen Charlotte Sound. The body of water he named was what is today known as Queen Charlotte Strait. The strait was called Queen Charlotte Sound until 1920 when the BCGNIS and Hydrographic Service distinguished between Queen Charlotte Sound and Queen Charlotte Strait. The British explorer George Vancouver, who used the name in his maps and writings, wrote that the sound was named by Mr. S. Wedgeborough, in command of the Experiment under Strange, but Vancouver was wrong—Strange was the one who gave the name.

== See also ==
- Queen Charlotte Channel
- Queen Charlotte Strait
- Royal eponyms in Canada
