= Cape Caution =

Headland in Brirish Columbia, Canada

- Cape
- Location in British Columbia
- Coordinates: 51°09′49″N 127°47′12″W
- Location: Central Coast, British Columbia
- Offshore water bodies: Queen Charlotte Sound; Queen Charlotte Strait

Dimensions
  - Length: 2 km (1.2 mi)
  - Width: 2.5 km (1.6 mi)
- Topo map: NTS 92M4 Cape Caution

Cape Caution is a headland along the Central Coast of the Canadian Province of British Columbia. It is the point where Queen Charlotte Strait meets Queen Charlotte Sound, as well as where Mount Waddington Regional District meets Central Coast Regional District.

== Toponymy ==
Cape Caution was named by British maritime explorer George Vancouver in May 1793 for the turbulent waters and rocky coastline found in the vicinity. Vancouver had nearly lost his ship, HMS Discovery, the previous year on a rock about 24 kilometres southeast of the headland.

== Geography ==
Cape Caution is located on the western end of a large unnamed peninsula. The cape measures 2 km (1.2 mi) long and 2.5 km (1.6 mi) at its widest. It is bound to the northwest by Blunden Bay and to the southeast by Silvester Bay. Despite the visual prominence of the cape, the true westernmost point of the unnamed peninsula is Neck Ness (51°11′45″N 127°47′44″W).

== Conservation ==
The unique ecology of the headland is protected within the 25,685 hectares (63,470 acres) Ugʷiwa’/Cape Caution Conservancy and the 331 hectares (820 acres) Ugʷiwa’/Cape Caution–Blunden Bay Conservancy.

== See also ==
- Cape Scott Lighthouse
