= Hope Island (British Columbia) =

Island in British Columbia, Canada

- Interactive map of Hope Island

Geography
- Location: Queen Charlotte Strait
- Coordinates: 50°54′54″N 127°54′11″W

Administration
- Canada
- Province: British Columbia

Hope Island is an island in the Central Coast region of the Canadian province of British Columbia. It is located in Queen Charlotte Strait just west of Nigei Island and is separated from the northern end of Vancouver Island by Goletas Channel. Bull Harbour is on Hope Island.

Hope Island is territory of the Tlatlasikwala Nation. The entirety of Hope Island is a Tlatlasikwala Indian reserve under federal Canadian law. No trespass without permission is allowed.

Hope Island was named by George Henry Richards in 1862, for James Hope of the British Royal Navy.

== See also ==
- List of islands of British Columbia
