= Dionisio Alcalá Galiano =

Spanish Navy officer

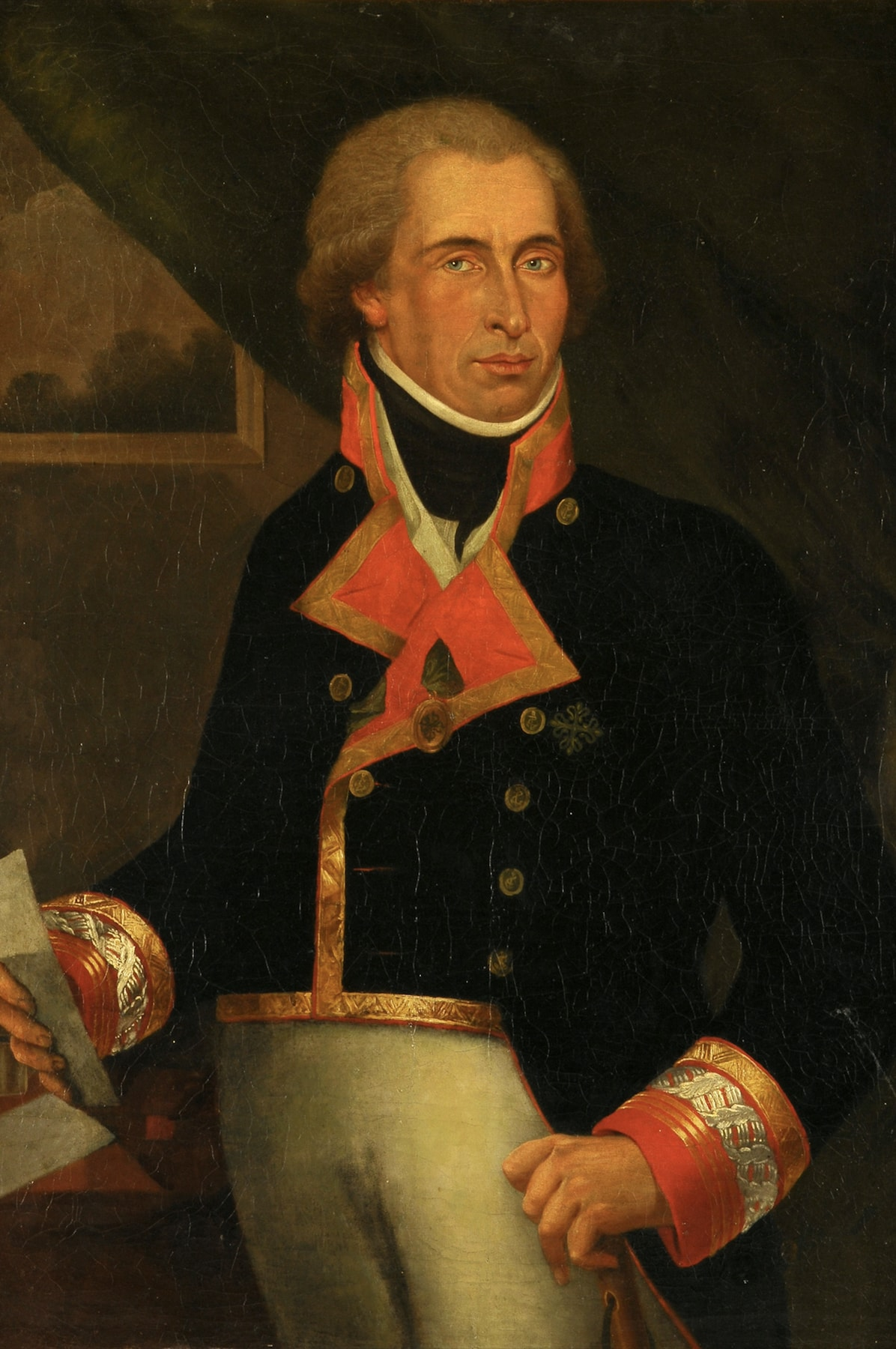
- Born: 8 October 1760; Cabra, Córdoba, Spain
- Died: 21 October 1805 (aged 45); Cape of Trafalgar, Spain
- Occupations: Naval officer; Cartographer; Explorer; Navigator

Dionisio Alcalá Galiano (8 October 1760 – 21 October 1805) was a Spanish Navy officer, cartographer, and explorer. He mapped various coastlines in Europe and the Americas with unprecedented accuracy using new technology such as chronometers. He commanded an expedition that explored and mapped the Strait of Juan de Fuca and the Strait of Georgia, and made the first European circumnavigation of Vancouver Island. He reached the rank of brigadier and died during the Battle of Trafalgar.

He sometimes signed his full surname, Alcalá-Galiano, but often used just Galiano. The published journal of his 1792 voyage uses just the name Galiano, and this has become the name by which he is most known.

== Early life ==
Galiano was born in Cabra, Córdoba, Spain, in 1760. He entered the Spanish navy in 1771, at the age of 11, and enrolled in the Spanish naval school in 1775. After graduation in 1779 he entered active service.

He participated in several hydrographic surveys and became skilled in cartography. As a junior officer he spent time in the River Plate region and the Falkland Islands. He returned to Spain in 1783.

In 1784 Galiano met and worked with Alejandro Malaspina, with whom he would later journey to America. Both men were among a group of officers studying astronomy at the Royal Observatory in Cádiz under Admiral Vicente Tofiño. The association was brief, as Tofiño was called upon to create an atlas of the coast of Spain, and he chose Galiano to work on the project. Thus Galiano assisted Tofiño's great hydrographic study, which resulted in the Atlas Maritímo de España, published in 1789. This experience was the basis of Galiano's expertise as a professional cartographer.

In 1785 Galiano married María de la Consolación Villavicencio. Soon after the marriage he left on a survey of the Strait of Magellan under another influential teacher, Antonio de Córdoba.

In 1788 he was given charge of a mission to fix the location of the Azores, during which he was in command of the brig Natalia. In the same year he assisted in the final stages of Tofiño's mapping project.

== Malaspina expedition ==
In 1789 Galiano was selected as the hydrographer for Malaspina's ambitious scientific and political voyage. Aboard the expedition's second ship, Atrevida, commanded by José Bustamante, he helped map the coastline Patagonia and most of the Pacific coast from southern Chile to Mexico. In addition, he engaged in various scientific tasks including astronomical observations, and gravity and magnetic measurements.

The expedition arrived in Acapulco in March 1791. Galiano was put in charge of a group of Malaspina's scientific officers assigned to stay in Mexico for a year. Malaspina's letter to the viceroy of New Spain, Juan Vicente de Güemes, Count of Revillagigedo, read in part: Under the orders of Ship Lieutenant Don Dionisio Galiano, he, together with [Novales, Pineda, and Olavide], will proceed to [Mexico] ... [Galiano] will be charged with coordinating in that capital, and later in Spain, all the notes of our past tasks ... Besides, he must extract all that information conducive to giving an exact idea of the former and present state of [New Spain].

Thus Galiano remained in Mexico, compiling the expedition's hydrographic and astronomical data, and making maps. He also investigated the colonial archives and collected information useful in assessing the state of the colony. This was one of the political tasks of the Malaspina expedition, for which Malaspina and his officers had royal authority above that of the viceroy, authorizing access to any and all documents they might think relevant. He spent about a year at this task, while the Malaspina expedition sailed to Alaska and Vancouver Island.

== 1792 voyage of the Sutil and Mexicana ==
Malaspina's voyage to Alaska was for the purpose of determining whether a rumored Northwest Passage existed there. Finding none, he returned to Mexico, stopping at Nootka Sound, on Vancouver Island, and Monterey, California. The Spanish had been exploring the Pacific Northwest for some years, and just as Malaspina was returning to Mexico another Spanish expedition, led by Francisco de Eliza, had discovered a large body of water inland beyond the eastern end of the Strait of Juan de Fuca. This was the Strait of Georgia. The pilots José María Narváez and Juan Carrasco had not had time to fully explore it, but had noted a promising opening leading to the east (which turned out to be the estuary of the Fraser River, which from offshore appeared to be a channel). It was the last reasonable chance of a possible Northwest Passage. One of the ships of the exploring party, the schooner Santa Saturnina, had been unable to return to Nootka and instead sailed south to Monterey, where Malaspina had just arrived. Thus Malaspina learned about the Strait of Georgia before the viceroy himself, who had been preparing another exploration expedition to the Strait of Juan de Fuca. In 1791 he had appointed Francisco Antonio Mourelle as commander and ordered two new schooners, Mexicana and Sutil, to be built for the mission. When Malaspina returned to Acapulco in late 1791 he managed to have Mourelle replaced with his own officer, Alcalá Galiano. Another of Malaspina's officers, Cayetano Valdés, was assigned to command the second schooner, replacing another of the viceroy's pilots. This effectively removed the two schooners from the viceroy's jurisdiction and placed them under Malaspina's authority. The vessels were moved from the shipyard at San Blas, where they had been built, to Acapulco, where they were fitted out under Malaspina's direction. Thus, although frequently said have been given the command by the viceroy Revillagigedo, Galiano's exploration expedition was essentially part of the larger Malaspina expedition. In addition, the artist José Cardero, who had accompanied Malaspina, sailed with Galiano.

The expedition left Acapulco on 8 March 1792. Galiano commanded the Sutil, and the expedition overall, while Valdés commanded the Mexicana. These ships were "goletas", a Spanish term often translated as "schooner". However goletas were not necessarily rigged as schooners. The Sutil was rigged as a brig and the Mexicana began rigged as a topsail schooner but was changed during the voyage to a brig.

=== Nootka Sound ===
On 13 May they arrived at the Spanish post at Nootka Sound, then under the command of Francisco de Eliza. Also present was Eliza's senior officer, Juan Francisco de la Bodega y Quadra, who had come to negotiate with George Vancouver the carrying out of the Nootka Convention, an agreement between Britain and Spain regarding the Nootka Crisis of 1789. Galiano and Valdés remained at Nootka Sound for about a month, during which time their ships were overhauled, repaired, and resupplied. The Mexicana had broken its masts on the voyage to Nootka Sound. Both its main mast and foremast were replaced. The crews were supplemented with a few soldiers serving at Fort San Miguel, members of the Free Company of Volunteers of Catalonia. While at Nootka Sound Galiano noted that the Nuu-chah-nulth (Nootka) had become friendly toward the Spanish again, after a period of hostility following the 1789 killing of Chief Callicum by Esteban José Martínez. According to Galiano, Chief Maquinna dined with Quadra nearly every day. Galiano also described the Spanish understanding of the Nuu-chah-nulth social class system, and identified three principal chiefs, which he spelled Macuina (Maquinna), Tlupananul, and Cicomacsia. He also mentioned the chief of the Clayoquot Sound area as Uicaninish (Wickaninnish). Galiano estimated the population of the Nuu-chah-nulth as not more than 4,000. On 20 May the Spaniards were invited to the village of Maluinas (Malvinas) by Chief Quicomacsia. Galiano noted that the year before this chief had called himself Quicsiocomic but had changed his name due to his marriage to a daughter of a chief of the Nuchimas (Nimpkish). Galiano admits to not understanding very well, but reports that Quicomacsia claimed that this marriage gave him a status above that of Maquinna, and that he was now the highest chief of the Nuu-chah-nulth and the Nimpkish. Nonetheless, Galiano noted that nearly everyone considered Maquinna to be sovereign of the coast from Esperanza Inlet to Escanlante Point, "and all the inlets between". Some kind of feudal system was guessed at by the Spanish. A group of Clayoquot natives arrived at Nootka Sound in late May, and Galiano noted that they had acquired a large number of firearms and desired in trade gunpowder above all else.

On 3 June a group of Nuu-chah-nulth asked Quadra for help against a ship that had attacked a village in Esperanza Inlet. They said that seven of their people had been killed, many wounded, and all their sea otter furs seized. Quadra had his surgeon tend some of the wounded and promised to punish the aggressors. Galiano was under the impression that the ship was the Columbia Rediviva under Robert Gray, but the attack was actually done by the English fur trader William Brown. Brown was the commander of three trading vessels, the Butterworth, Jackal, and Prince Lee Boo, collectively known as the Butterworth Squadron. He had a grant from the British government to set up a fur trading post on the coast of Vancouver Island. It was expected that Spain would turn over the post at Nootka Sound to the British later in the year, but due to Quadra's firm stand the transfer did not happen. Brown may have been planning to take over the post, but instead did not establish any post. Later in the year Brown had a violent conflict with the indigenous people of Clayoqout Sound as well. He claimed he acted in self-defense, while other fur traders said he forcefully stole furs from the Clayoquot people.

On 18 and 28 May the Spanish made an observation of the moons of Jupiter, allowing them to finely calibrate their chronometers. Two other chances to make the observation failed due to cloudy skies.

=== Strait of Juan de Fuca ===
Galiano and Valdés left Nootka Sound very early on 5 June and entered the Strait of Juan de Fuca, reaching at today's Neah Bay (Puerto de Núñez Gaona to the Spanish) the next day, where a Spanish post was being established by Salvador Fidalgo. They anchored near Fidalgo's ship, the corvette Princesa. Galiano reports that the Makah were friendly and similar to the Nuu-chah-nulth, but that Fidalgo did not trust them. Later in the year there was a violent conflict between the Spanish and Makah, for which Fidalgo was severely reprimanded. The Makah Chief Tetacus (also known as Tatoosh or Tatlacu) led the attack. When Galiano and Valdés were at Neah Bay earlier in the year, however, Tetacus was friendly. He was invited on board the Sutil and Mexicana, and examined them with a curiosity that impressed Galiano. On 8 June, when the ships were about to leave Neah Bay, Tetacus visited and said he was planning to travel into the Strait of Juan de Fuca as well. Valdés urged him to accompany the Spanish and he accepted the offer.

Having with them maps and information about the Strait of Juan de Fuca obtained by Quimper in 1790 and Eliza in 1791, Galiano intended to sail quickly to Bellingham Bay and then north into the Strait of Georgia. In accordance with his orders, Galiano was most interested in unexplored waters that extended east into the continent. For that reason he opted not to explore the south-tending Boca de Caamaño (Admiralty Inlet), which would have led him into Puget Sound. In any case, George Vancouver had just finished his exploration of Puget Sound when Galiano and Valdés were sailing into the Strait of Juan de Fuca.

The Sutil and Mexicana left Neah Bay on 8 June, crossing to the north side of the Strait and cruising along the coast of Vancouver Island. They sailed through the night, reaching Race Rocks around dawn, then made for Esquimalt Harbour (Puerto de Córdova). Tetacus suggested a place to stop and take on water, there being fewer sources near Esquimalt Harbour. Galiano and Valdés were impressed by Tetacus in many ways. He knew the names of all the Spanish and British captains who had been to the region, and said that two ships had already entered the Strait of Juan de Fuca — these being the ships of George Vancouver. Tetacus was also shown a map of the Strait of Juan de Fuca and recognized many places and told the Spanish what the native names were. He was one of the region's more powerful chiefs, more or less of the status of Maquinna and Wickaninnish.

The Spanish anchored in Esquimalt Harbour around noon on 9 June. Soon two of his wives arrived by canoe. They had followed from Neah Bay by canoe, not wanting to sail on the Spanish ships. In the evening the Spanish officers went to the villages on shore. Galiano thought that Tetacus was the chief of these villages, but it is unlikely that they were his people since they were in the territory of the Songhees while Tetacus was a Makah. He may have been a relative. José Cardero, an artist who accompanied Galiano and Valdés, drew portraits of Tetacus and two of his wives. One of his wives is shown wearing Coast Salish dress. She may have been a Songhees woman.

The Spanish ships left Esquimalt very early on 10 June. They made for Smith Island (Isla de Bonilla) and, after sighting it, turned to the north, making for Lopez Island. They anchored near Point Colville at the southern end of Lopez Island. A party was sent ashore to make an observation of the first moon of Jupiter, by which they were able to improve their longitude measurements. The next day they sailed northeast through part of Rosario Strait and through Guemes Channel into Padilla Bay, noting a village on the shore of Guemes Island. That evening they anchored in Bellingham Bay (Seno de Gaston).

=== Meeting the Vancouver Expedition ===
On 13 June, near Point Roberts, they encountered HMS Chatham, under William Robert Broughton, second in command of the British expedition of George Vancouver. They met Vancouver himself on 21 June, near present-day Vancouver, British Columbia. Galiano and Vancouver established a friendly relationship and agreed to assist one another by dividing up the surveying work and sharing charts. They worked together in this way until 13 July, after which each resumed circumnavigating Vancouver Island separately. Galiano's ships sailed north around the island, through Cordero Channel and Goletas Channel, proving that it was in fact an island. They reached Nootka Sound, completing the circuit, on 31 August. Vancouver's ships had arrived earlier.

Since Galiano had set out from Nootka while Vancouver had entered the Strait of Juan de Fuca directly from the south, Galiano and his crew became the first Europeans to circumnavigate Vancouver Island. They were also the first Europeans to discover and enter the Fraser River, on 14 June 1792.

Galiano had received letters of suggestion and order from both Malaspina and Viceroy Revillagigedo. Malaspina urged a stop at San Francisco on the return, in order to map and assess the Spanish colony there, which Malaspina's expedition had been unable to do. The viceroy, while not directly contradicting Malaspina, informed Galiano of the "almost continuous fog" at San Francisco and the lack of provisions compared to Monterey. Careful not to give contrary orders, the viceroy strongly suggested that Monterey would be a better place to stop than San Francisco. As it turned out, Galiano stopped at Monterey and not San Francisco, due to inclement weather. Both Malaspina and the viceroy also urged Galiano to investigate the "Entrada de Ezeta" (the mouth of the Columbia River), which the Spanish expedition of Bruno de Heceta (also spelled Ezeta) had sighted in 1775, but had been unable to enter or even determine whether it was a river or a strait. At Nootka Sound Galiano learned from Juan Francisco de la Bodega y Quadra that Robert Gray had already entered the river. Quadra had given Galiano a sketch map of the river's mouth based on Gray's information. Galiano sighted the Columbia River on 8 September 1792. He did not enter the river, claiming that his ships were inappropriate for the task. However he did fix the location and determine that it was a river and not a strait.

Galiano returned to Mexico in late 1792 and began to write an account of his explorations, which was published in 1802, unusual in that Spain typically kept its exploration results secret. Galiano would likely have remained obscure if not for his exploration of the Strait of Georgia and Vancouver Island.

In 1795 Malaspina was imprisoned for plotting against the state. Spain had planned to publish a grand report and atlas about his expedition, but after his political downfall this became impossible. After reports of the voyages of La Pérouse and George Vancouver were published in 1797 and 1798, the Spanish authorities, unwilling to publish Malaspina's report, which would have surpassed any other, settled on publishing only the account of Galiano's expedition. Malaspina's name was totally removed and the fiction that Galiano operated under the direction of viceroy Revillagigedo was inserted. In effect Galiano replaced Malaspina as Spain's great explorer of the late 18th century.

== Later career ==
After Galiano's return to Spain in 1794, he was made a member of the Order of Alcántara, by royal decree dated December 5, 1795.

Alessandro Malaspina returned to Spain in August 1794. Galiano joined him in presenting the Malaspina expedition's report to the Commander in Madrid. Along with two other officers they stayed in the capital to prepare a planned publication compiled from the vast quantity of reports, observations, charts, drawings, and other data collected during Malaspina's five-year voyage. This massive undertaking, which was to include a grand narrative and an atlas, was intended to rival the publication of the expeditions of James Cook. Galiano's 1792 exploration of the Strait of Georgia was to be an important complement to the accounts of Malaspina's visits to Alaska and Nootka. However, Malaspina tried to influence Spanish politics regarding the American colonies with disastrous consequences. He was arrested in late 1795 and imprisoned from 1796 to 1802, after which he was exiled from Spain. Nearly all documents from his expedition were seized and publication forbidden. As a result, Galiano's account of his exploration, published in 1802, became the only Spanish publication about Spanish activities in the Pacific Northwest for many years, and Galiano's name became synonymous with Spanish exploration of the region.

After this, Galiano returned to cartography and then active duty as war broke out with Britain. Careful to distance himself from Malaspina, Galiano remained untainted by the political disaster. In 1797 he was in command of the frigate Vencedor during the Battle of Cape St Vincent.

In 1798 Galiano went with a group of ships to America to bring treasure to Spain, much needed for war funding. He slipped through the British blockade of Cádiz at night during a storm, then sailed to the Caribbean, picking up silver and other valuables at Cartagena and Veracruz. Returning, he had to evade enemy ships several times, but reached Cádiz safely. He made a second treasure voyage to New Spain and commanded a small squadron on the return voyage. British ships and bad weather drove him into Havana, where he was when the Treaty of Amiens ended the war in 1802.

In December 1804 war broke out again between Spain and Britain. Galiano, now a brigadier, was given command of the 76-gun ship Bahama. He fought in the Battle of Trafalgar, where he was killed by a cannonball on 21 October 1805. His body was buried at sea from his half wrecked ship.

== Legacy ==
Galiano Island, an island on the Strait of Georgia, is named for Alcalá Galiano, as are Alcala Point and Dionisio Point on the islands' northern end. The island's highest point of land, 341m, is Mt Galiano, now the site of the Mt Galiano Nature Protection Area managed by the Galiano Club (founded in 1924). The main hiking trail here, opened in 1992 on the 200th anniversary of the historic meeting, is named for Dionisio Galiano. Salamanca Point, on the east side of Galiano Island, is named for Secundino Salamanca, one of Galiano's officers. An unusual cliff formation on Gabriola Island is named Galiano Gallery. The Canadian warship HMCS Galiano was likewise named for him. The ship alternated duties with a similar vessel, HMCS Malaspina, named for Galiano's commander and associate. Sutil Channel is named for Galiano's vessel, the Sutil, as is Cape Sutil at the northern end of Vancouver Island and Mount Sutil, the second highest point of land on Galiano Island.

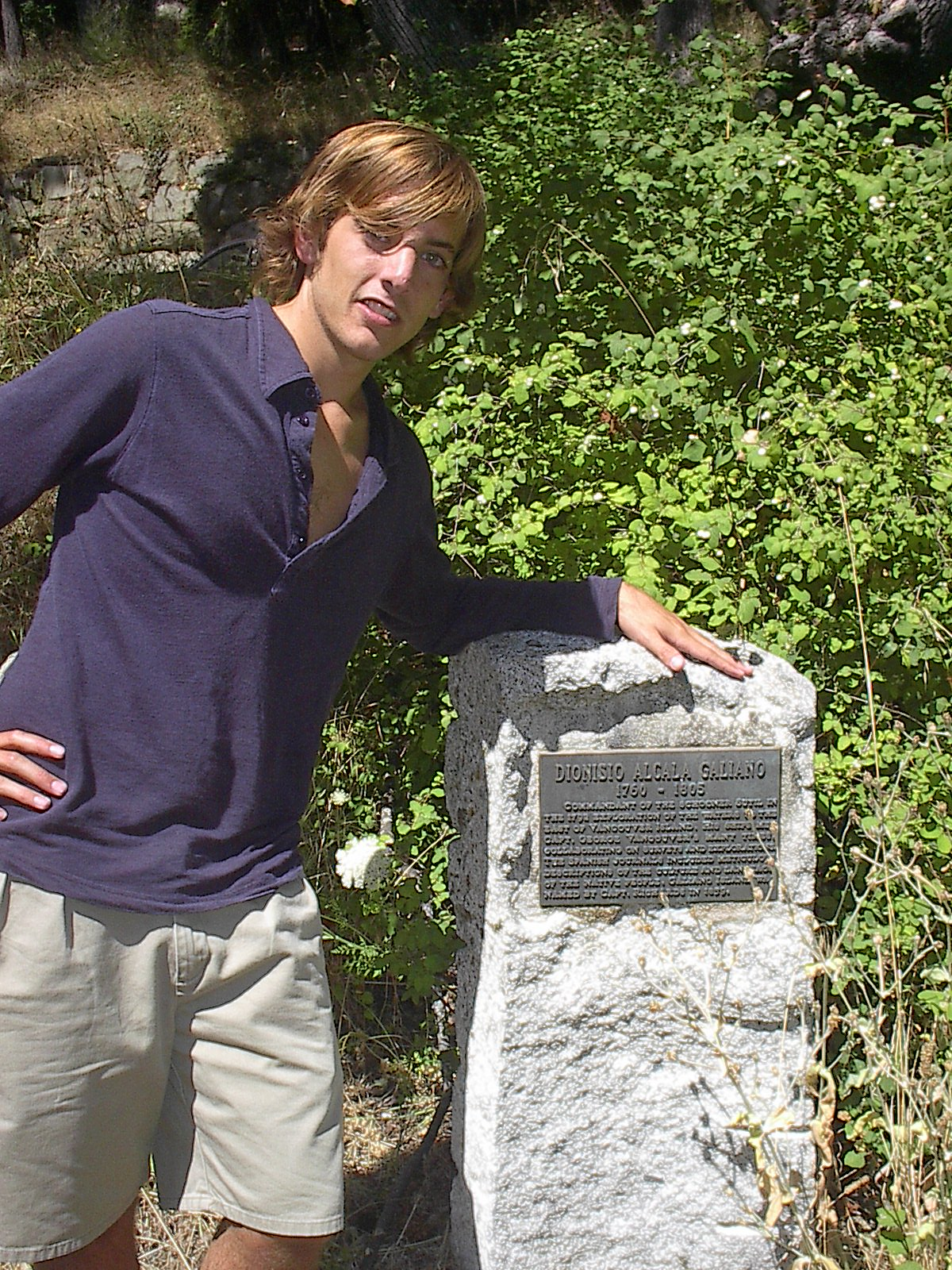
Jaime Alcalá Galiano, direct descendant of Dionisio Alcalá Galiano, at the Galiano Is. memorial stone now located at the Galiano Museum site.

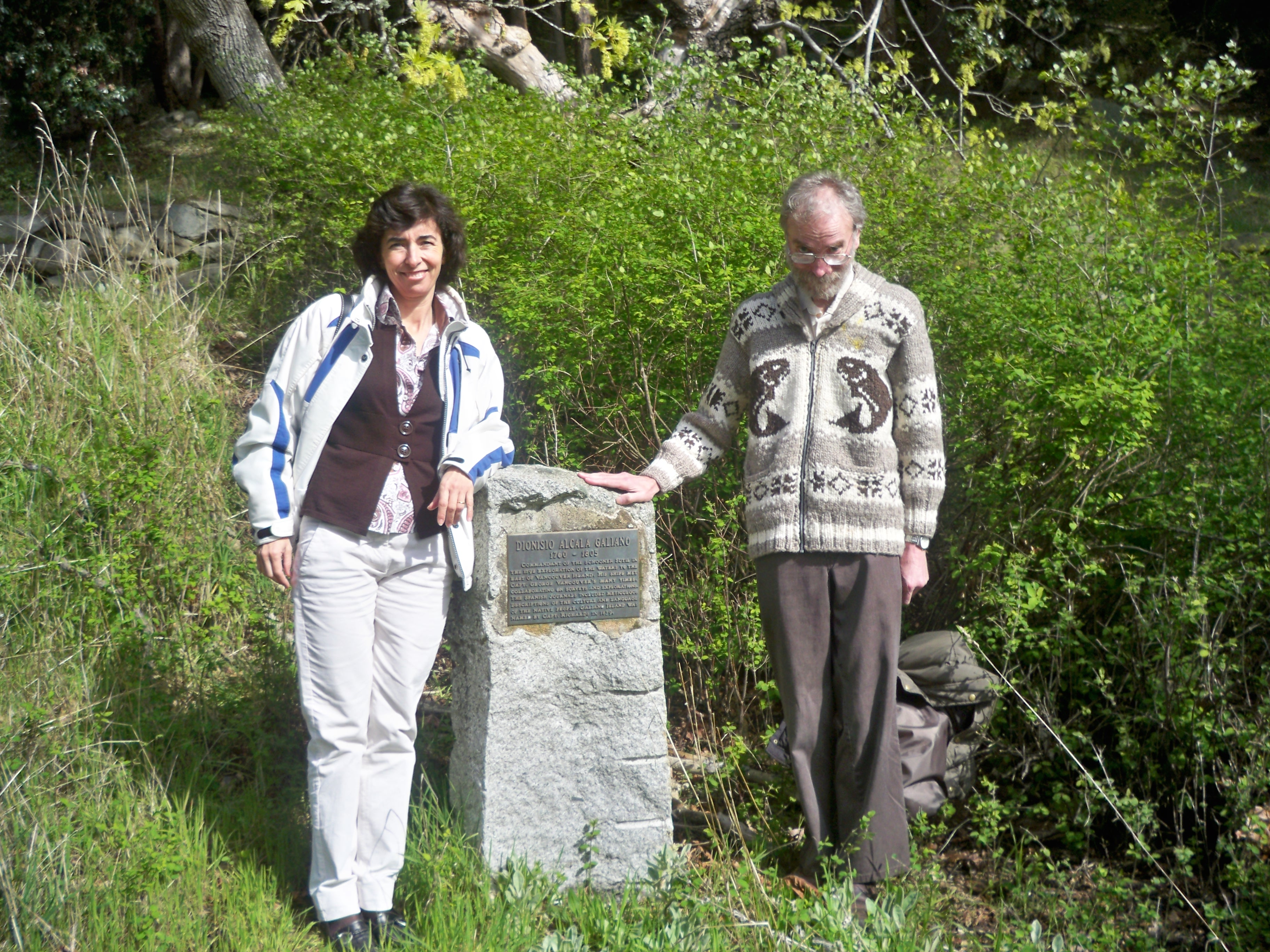
Almudena Alcalá-Galiano with local historian, Andrew Loveridge, at the Dionisio Alcalá-Galiano memorial.

== See also ==
- Cordero Channel
