= Bull Harbour =

Coordinates: 50.918°N 127.925°W

Location of Bull Harbour in British Columbia

Bull Harbour is a settlement in British Columbia, Canada.

Bull Harbour is a settlement on Hope Island, just north of northern Vancouver Island across Goletas Channel. It has an estimated population of 2-20 people.

The name Bull Harbour has been in use since at least 1841. The name likely comes from the large and fierce sea lions that frequent the area.

== Climate ==
The climate is temperate oceanic (Cfb in the Köppen climate classification) with a strong drying trend in summer. Winters are cool and wet, directly affected by Pacific lows, while summers are mild. The most rain falls in November, while the least rain falls in July.

Climate data for Bull Harbour
Month	Jan	Feb	Mar	Apr	May	Jun	Jul	Aug	Sep	Oct	Nov	Dec	Year
Record high °C (°F)	16.7 (62.1)	20 (68)	22.2 (72.0)	22.5 (72.5)	30.4 (86.7)	37.8 (100.0)	25.6 (78.1)	30 (86)	28.9 (84.0)	26.3 (79.3)	23.9 (75.0)	15.6 (60.1)	37.8 (100.0)
Mean daily maximum °C (°F)	6 (43)	7.2 (45.0)	8.7 (47.7)	10.3 (50.5)	12.2 (54.0)	13.8 (56.8)	15.7 (60.3)	16.2 (61.2)	15 (59)	12.2 (54.0)	8.1 (46.6)	6.2 (43.2)	11 (52)
Daily mean °C (°F)	3.6 (38.5)	4.5 (40.1)	5.5 (41.9)	6.8 (44.2)	8.9 (48.0)	10.9 (51.6)	12.9 (55.2)	13.3 (55.9)	11.7 (53.1)	9.1 (48.4)	5.6 (42.1)	3.8 (38.8)	8.1 (46.6)
Mean daily minimum °C (°F)	1.2 (34.2)	1.8 (35.2)	2.2 (36.0)	3.3 (37.9)	5.6 (42.1)	8 (46)	10 (50)	10.4 (50.7)	8.4 (47.1)	5.9 (42.6)	3.1 (37.6)	1.4 (34.5)	5.1 (41.2)
Record low °C (°F)	−12.8 (9.0)	−11 (12)	−10.6 (12.9)	−3.7 (25.3)	−2.2 (28.0)	1.1 (34.0)	4.4 (39.9)	1.2 (34.2)	0 (32)	−6.1 (21.0)	−13.8 (7.2)	−12.2 (10.0)	−13.8 (7.2)
Average precipitation mm (inches)	285.7 (11.25)	217.1 (8.55)	189.3 (7.45)	156.1 (6.15)	106.1 (4.18)	107.1 (4.22)	73.2 (2.88)	73.8 (2.91)	151.7 (5.97)	234.8 (9.24)	320 (12.6)	286.7 (11.29)	2,201.7 (86.68)
Source: 1971-2000 Environment Canada
