= Course (sail) =

Type of square sail

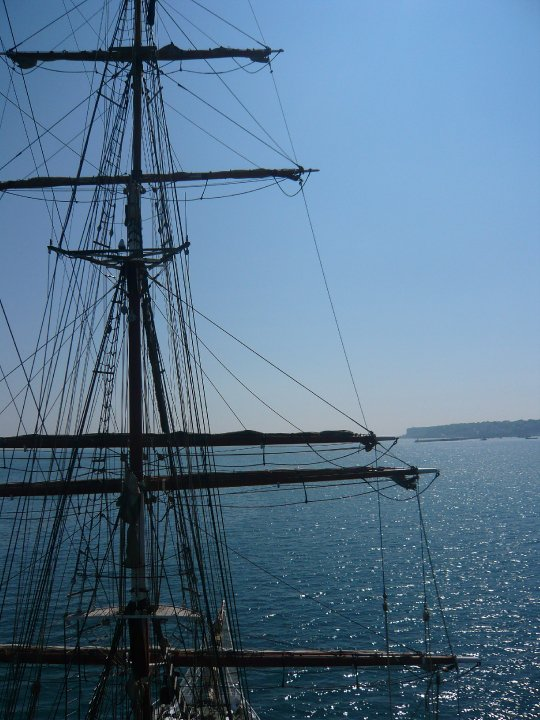
Illustration of the foremast of the Stavros S Niarchos. The course sail is the lowermost sail.

In sailing, a course is a type of square sail. It is the sail set on the lowest yard on a mast. The courses are given a name derived from the mast on which they are set, so the course on the foremast may be called the fore-course or the foresail; similarly main-course or mainsail for that carried on the mainmast. On the mizzen, a course is not usually carried. If it is, it is called the crossjack (or cro'jack) or mizzen sail. The lower yard on the mizzen takes the same name (crossjack). When there is no sail set from this yard it is still needed to sheet home the topsail. In that case, a clue to the arrangement is the absence of footropes.Above it lay topsail.

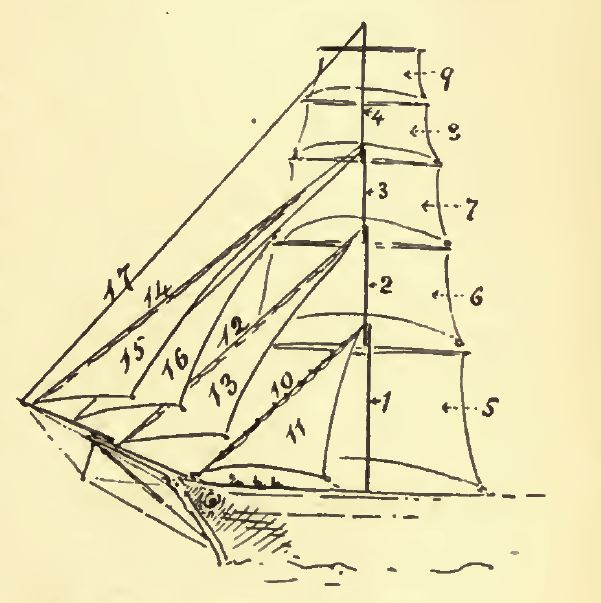
Sketch of a square rigged foremast. The course is numbered 5
