= Queen Charlotte Strait =

Strait in British Columbia, Canada

- French: Détroit de la Reine-Charlotte
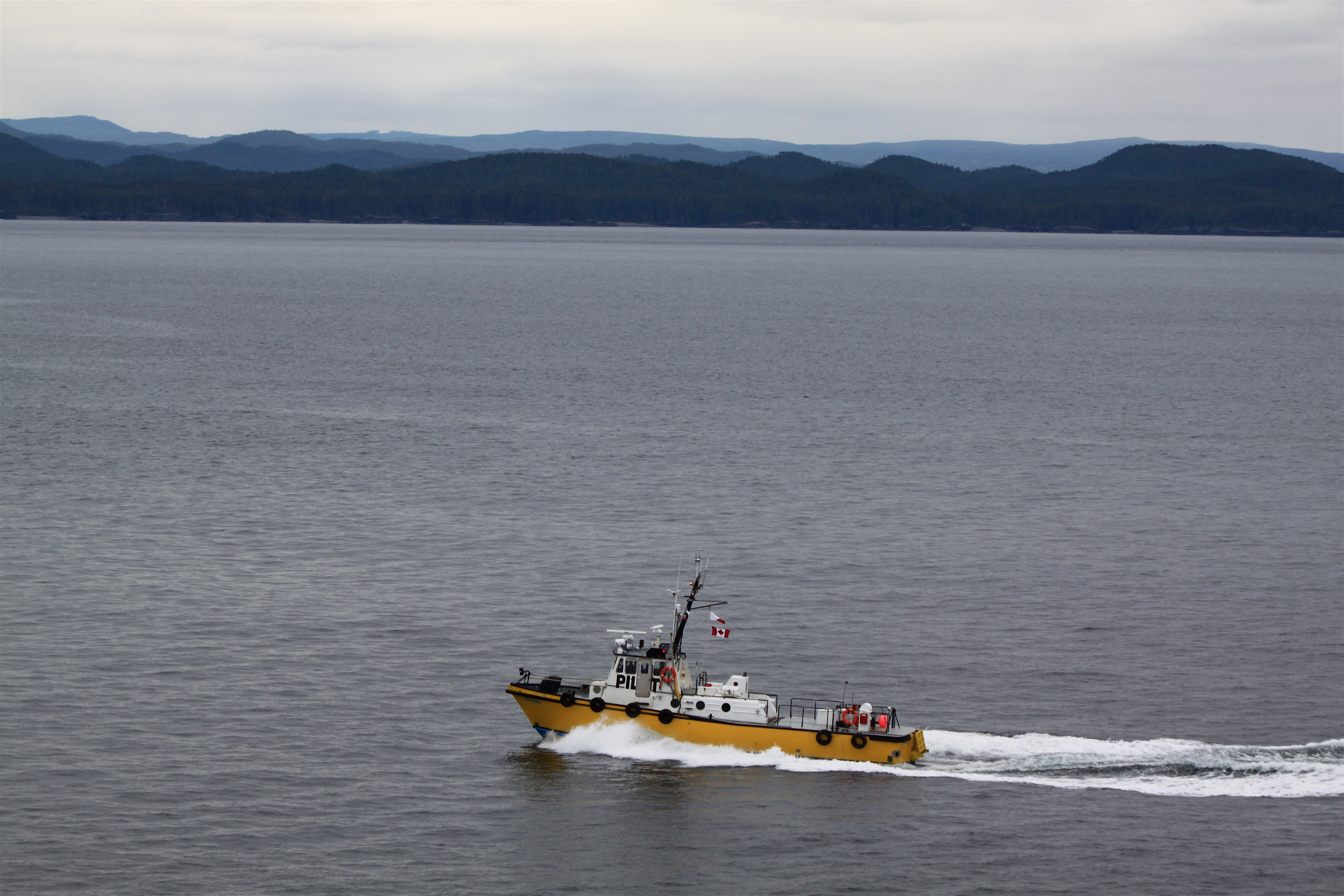
- A pilot boat plies Queen Charlotte Strait near Port Hardy

- Location within British Columbia

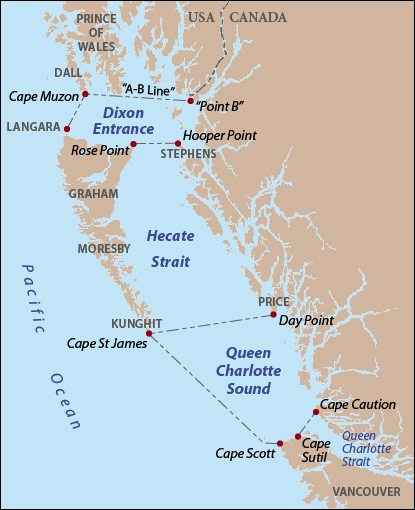
- Queen Charlotte Strait is located southeast of Queen Charlotte Sound
- Location: British Columbia
- Coordinates: 50°50′16″N 127°27′29″W
- Type: Strait
- Ocean/sea sources: Pacific Ocean
- Settlements: Alert Bay, Port Hardy, Port McNeill, Sointula

Queen Charlotte Strait is a strait between Vancouver Island and the mainland of British Columbia, Canada. It connects Queen Charlotte Sound with Johnstone Strait and Discovery Passage and via them to the Strait of Georgia and Puget Sound. It forms part of the Inside Passage from Washington to Alaska. The term Queen Charlotte Strait is also used to refer to the general region and its many communities, notably of the Kwakwakaʼwakw peoples. Despite its name, Queen Charlotte Strait does not lie between Haida Gwaii (Queen Charlotte Islands) and the mainland; that body of water is named Hecate Strait.

== Etymology ==
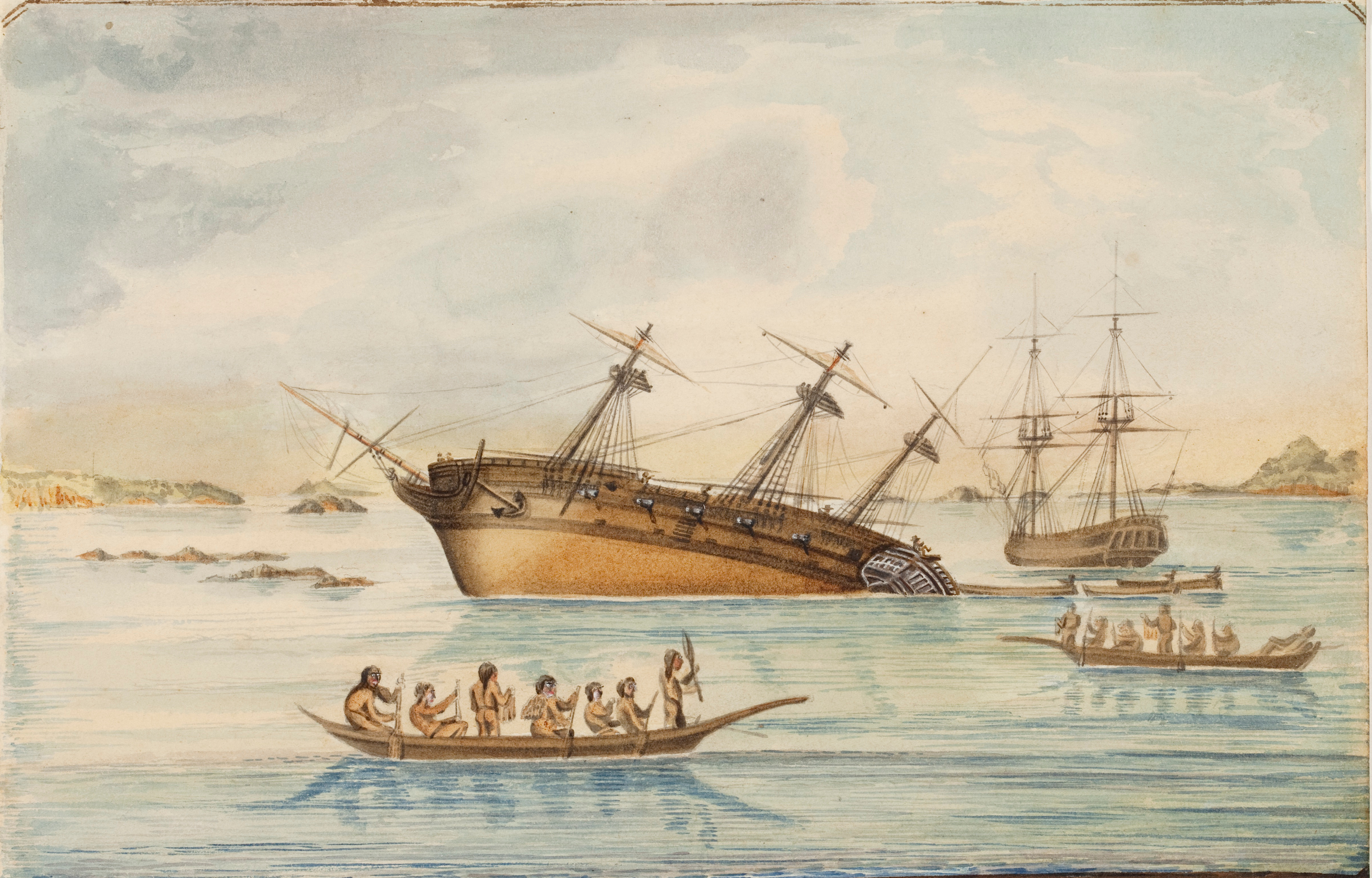
The Discovery ran aground in early August 1792 on hidden rocks in Queen Charlotte Strait near Fife Sound. Within a day the Chatham (at right) also ran aground on rocks about two miles away.

Queen Charlotte Sound was named by James Strange on August 5, 1786, in honour of Queen Charlotte, the consort of King George III. Strange was the leader of a fur trading expedition of two vessels, the Captain Cook, under Captain Henry Lawrie, and the Experiment, under Captain John Guise. During a boat excursion up Goletas Channel, Strange saw an opening ahead and named it Queen Charlotte Sound. The body of water he named was what is today known as Queen Charlotte Strait.

For some time Queen Charlotte Strait was also called Queen Charlotte Sound, until 1920 when the BCGNIS and Hydrographic Service distinguished between Queen Charlotte Sound and Queen Charlotte Strait. George Vancouver, who used the name in his maps and writings, wrote that the sound was named by Mr. S. Wedgeborough, in command of the Experiment under James Strange, but this is probably a mistake.

== Geography ==
According to the BC Geographical Names, the northern boundary of Queen Charlotte Strait is defined as a line running Cape Sutil, at the north end of Vancouver Island, to Cape Caution on the mainland. The southern end of Queen Charlotte Strait is described as "several narrow channels north and east of Malcolm Island".

The strait lies between the mainland and Vancouver Island portions of the Regional District of Mount Waddington, a form of regional municipal governance with power over zoning, building and sewer permits and inter-municipal integration. Most communities in the region, however, are Indian reserve communities of the Kwakwakaʼwakw peoples which are outside the jurisdiction of regional district governance. The traditional territories of most of the various Kwakwaka'wakw peoples overlap in the strait, which is a vital fishery resource and transportation link between their communities.

== See also ==
- Broughton Archipelago
- Knight Inlet
- List of fjords in Canada
- Queen Charlotte Channel
- Queen Charlotte Sound (Canada)
- Royal eponyms in Canada
