= Cayetano Valdés y Flores =

Spanish Navy officer and explorer

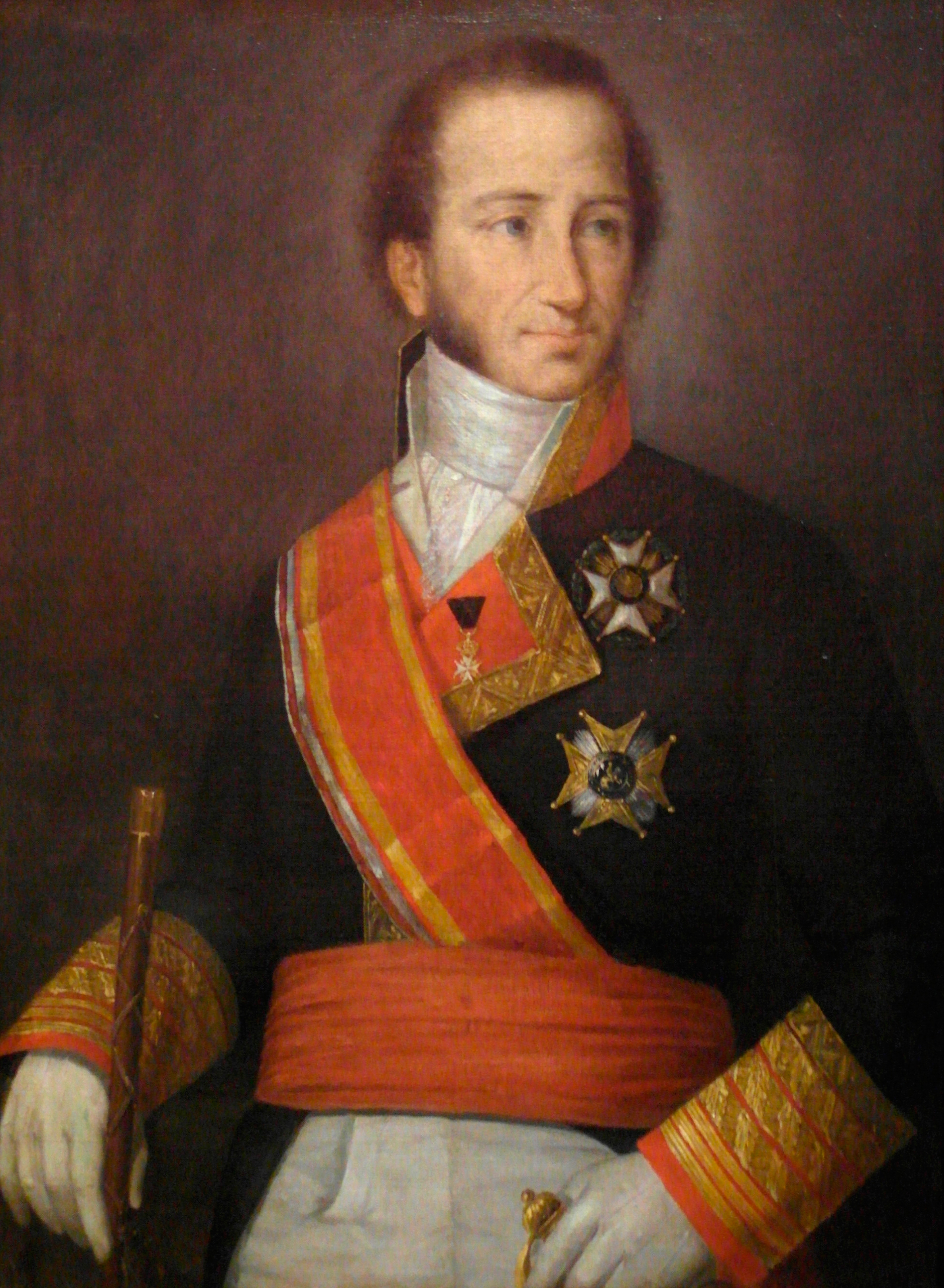
1847 portrait of Valdés by José Roldán y Martínez

Cayetano Valdés y Flores Bazán (28 September 1767 – 6 February 1835) was a Spanish Navy officer and explorer who served in the American Revolutionary War and the French Revolutionary and Napoleonic Wars, fighting on opposing sides at different times due to the changing fortunes of Spain. He took part in a number of battles, including the Battle of Cape Spartel, the Battle of Cape St. Vincent and the Battle of Trafalgar. He was an explorer, most notable in the Pacific Northwest, where he and Dionisio Alcalá Galiano conducted the first circumnavigation of Vancouver Island, in partial cooperation with George Vancouver. Over his long career he achieved the highest ranks in the Spanish Navy, eventually being named Captain General of Cádiz and Captain General of the Navy.

== Early career ==
He was born in Seville in 1767, and was the nephew of Antonio Valdés y Fernández Bazán. Cayetano Valdés joined the Naval Academy in Cádiz as a guardiamarina (midshipman) in 1781. After finishing his studies he sailed with the fleet of Luis de Córdova and in 1782 saw action in the battle of Cape Spartel with a British fleet under Richard Howe, during the Great Siege of Gibraltar. In 1783 Valdés took part in a Spanish operation against Algiers in an effort to crush the Barbary corsairs sponsored by the Dey.

== Malaspina and Galiano expeditions ==
In 1789 Valdés achieved a position as a lieutenant (teniente de navío) on the scientific expedition of Alejandro Malaspina.

In 1791 Malaspina gave him command of the "goleta" Mexicana and orders to explore the Strait of Juan de Fuca and Strait of Georgia in an expedition under the command of another of Malaspina's officers, Dionisio Alcalá Galiano The term "goleta" is Spanish for a schooner-like ship but not necessary rigged as a schooner.

Galiano and Valdés named Goletas Channel, on the northern end of Vancouver Island, after their goletas. The Mexicana began rigged as a topsail schooner but was changed during the voyage to a brig. During the summer of 1792 Valdés and Galiano circumnavigated Vancouver Island, meeting George Vancouver along the way. After working together for a time the two expeditions split up and arrived at Nootka Sound separately. Because Valdés and Galiano had begun their voyage around the island from Nootka Sound while Vancouver had begun at the Strait of Juan de Fuca, the Spaniards became the first Europeans to fully circumnavigate the island.

== French Revolutionary and Napoleonic Wars ==
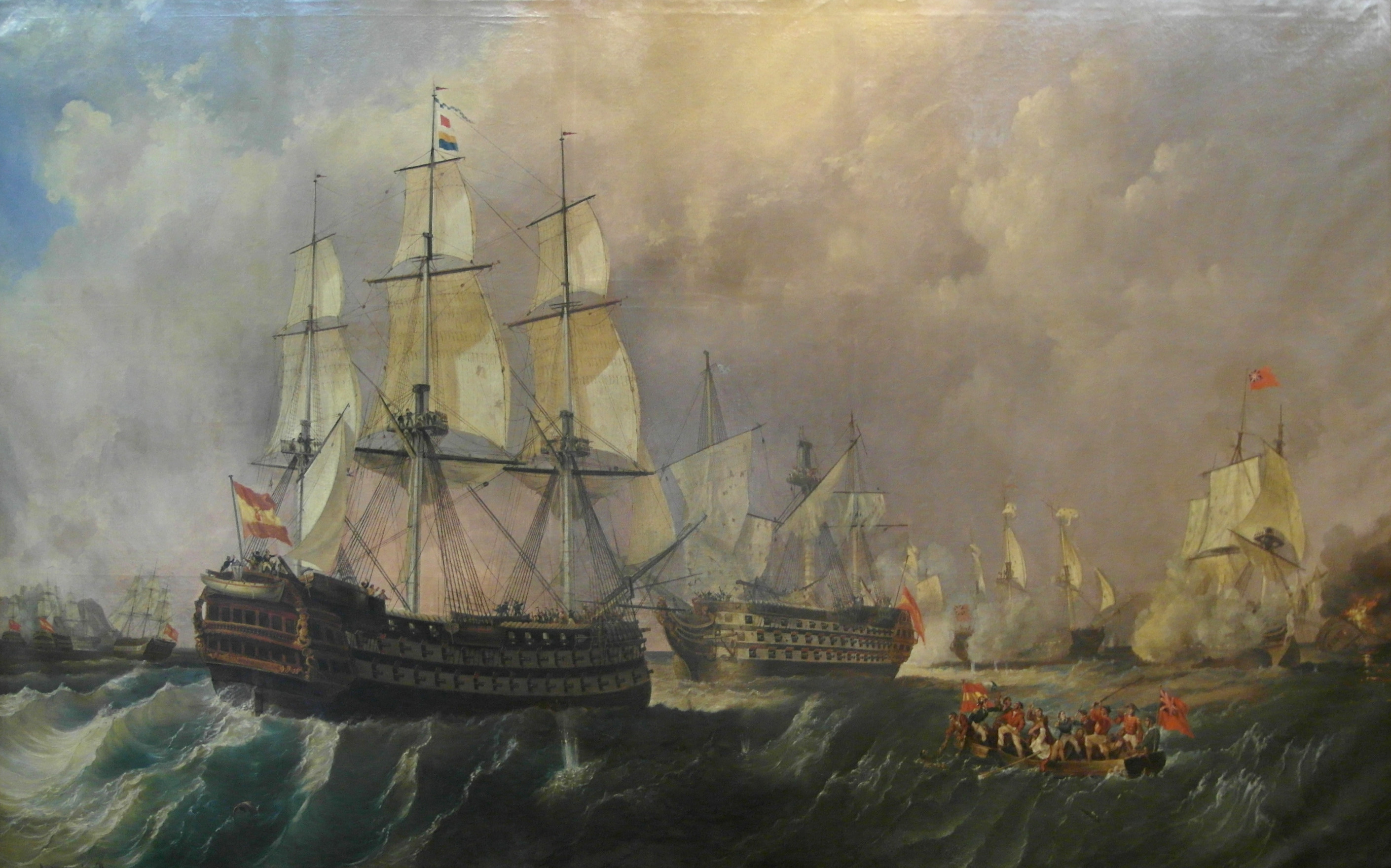
Valdés captaining Infante don Pelayo during the Battle of Cape St. Vincent

In 1797 Valdés was in command of the ship of the line Infante don Pelayo at the Battle of Cape St. Vincent when a British fleet under Sir John Jervis defeated the Spanish. During the battle, Valdés came to the rescue of Nuestra Señora de la Santísima Trinidad, which had struck her colours. Due to the assistance provided by Infante don Pelayo and Don Pablo, Santísima Trinidad raised her colours again and left the battlefield along with the rest of the Spanish fleet. For his actions, Valdés was promoted to ship-of-the-line captain and gained a reputation as a strong fighter.

Under the terms of the Third Treaty of San Ildefonso, Infante don Pelayo was given to the French Navy and Valdés was given command of the Neptuno, then stationed at Brest, France. In November 1801 he was part of the Spanish contingent of a French-led fleet which sailed from Europe to Spain to overthrow the regime of Toussaint Louverture in Saint-Domingue. After stopping in Havana he returned to Cádiz in 1802, where he was appointed brigadier de la Real Armada.

In 1805, Valdés and the Neptuno were based in Cádiz as commodore of a squadron of ships, and so they were called on to fight when the French fleet attempted to make the open sea during the Trafalgar campaign. On the 21 October the combined fleet was chased down and attacked at the Battle of Trafalgar. Valdés fought hard, his ship was leading the combined fleet and turned back into the melee behind him. Unfortunately the French ships accompanying the Neptuno under Admiral Dumanior did not turn back and so the isolated Neptuno was surrounded and suffered great damage. Valdés himself was seriously wounded and eventually lost consciousness and the disabled Neptuno was eventually forced to surrender.

Although his ship was wrecked in the storm which followed the battle, Valdés and many of his shipmates survived, and thus he was in England when the Peninsular War broke out in Spain in 1808. Immediately released and returning home, Valdés enlisted in the land army. Leading one of the brigades of the Army of Galicia, under Joaquín Blake, Valdés participated at the Battle of Espinosa, where he was again seriously wounded.

== Later life ==
He was appointed captain-general of Cádiz, but on the return of Ferdinand VII of Spain, he was imprisoned during the repression which followed the restitution of an absolute monarchy. Released in 1820, following Riego's 1820 revolt, Valdés was again appointed governor of Cádiz during the Trienio Liberal, seeing active service again defending the city during the siege that followed the Battle of Trocadero. Under a sentence of death, he initially chose not to flee Cádiz, but the French military governor had him arrested and sent him, under the French flag, to Gibraltar, from whence Valdés would eventually go into exile in England, where he lived for ten years.

In 1833 Isabella II of Spain recalled Valdés and named him Captain General of Cádiz and later of the Spanish Navy.

Vayetano Valdés died on June 6, 1835, in San Fernando, Cádiz.

== Legacy ==
Valdes Island, an island on the Strait of Georgia, is named for Cayetano Valdés, as is Cayetano Point on that island's southwestern end. Other features on Valdes Island that relate to the 1792 voyage include Mexicana Hill, named for Valdés's ship the Mexicana, Dibuxante Point, named for the artist José Cardero who sailed on board the Mexicana, and Vernaci Point, for Juan Vernacci y Retamal, one of Valdés's officers.
