= List of provincial parks of Vancouver Island =

The list of provincial parks of Vancouver Island contains the provincial parks located on the island, which is part of the province of British Columbia. It includes parks from the seven regional districts of Alberni-Clayoquot, Capital, Comox Valley, Cowichan Valley, Nanaimo, and the island portions of Mount Waddington and Strathcona. These parks are administered by BC Parks under the jurisdiction of the Ministry of Environment and Climate Change Strategy.

== Parks ==
=== Alberni-Clayoquot Regional District ===
Name	Established	Commons category	Picture	Coordinates
Clayoquot Arm Provincial Park				49.1778°N 125.567°W
Clayoquot Plateau Provincial Park				49.225°N 125.431°W
Dawley Passage Provincial Park				49.14722222°N 125.78611111°W
Epper Passage Provincial Park				49.21944444°N 125.95°W
Flores Island Marine Provincial Park	1995			49.2875°N 126.192°W
Fossli Provincial Park				49.25°N 124.95°W
Gibson Marine Provincial Park				49.2667°N 126.067°W
Hesquiat Lake Provincial Park				49.502°N 126.388°W
Hesquiat Peninsula Provincial Park				49.4417°N 126.517°W
Kennedy Lake Provincial Park				49.05°N 125.5969°W
Kennedy River Bog Provincial Park				49.0972°N 125.617°W
Maquinna Marine Provincial Park	1955	Maquinna Marine Provincial Park		49.4°N 126.342°W
Sproat Lake Provincial Park	1966-06-06	Sproat Lake Provincial Park		49.2961°N 124.927°W
Stamp River Provincial Park	1940-12-20	Stamp River Provincial Park		49.341666666667°N 124.925°W
Sulphur Passage Provincial Park				49.4167°N 126.183°W
Sydney Inlet Provincial Park				49.4806°N 126.279°W
Taylor Arm Provincial Park				49.2833°N 125.05°W
Tranquil Creek Provincial Park				49.3167°N 125.619°W
Vargas Island Provincial Park				49.1792°N 126.028°W

=== Capital Regional District ===
Name	Established	Commons category	Picture	Coordinates
Beaver Point Provincial Park	1949			48.771388888889°N 123.40361111111°W
Bellhouse Provincial Park	1964-08-21			48.8722°N 123.31°W
Bodega Ridge Provincial Park	2001-04-11			48.9583°N 123.525°W
Burgoyne Bay Provincial Park	2004			48.8°N 123.533°W
Collinson Point Provincial Park	2004			48.86166667°N 123.36166667°W
Dionisio Point Provincial Park	1991-07-31	Dionisio Point Provincial Park		49.01277778°N 123.57277778°W
Discovery Island Marine Provincial Park	1972			48.416666666667°N 123.23333333333°W
French Beach Provincial Park	1974-01-24			48.3941°N 123.943°W
Goldstream Provincial Park	1958			48.4667°N 123.55°W
Gowlland Tod Provincial Park	1993			48.546°N 123.51°W
John Dean Provincial Park	1921			48.61222222°N 123.44805556°W
Juan de Fuca Provincial Park	1996			48.4833°N 124.283°W
Montague Harbour Marine Provincial Park		Montague Harbour Marine Provincial Park		48.9°N 123.4°W
Mount Maxwell Provincial Park				48.804166666667°N 123.51583333333°W
Ruckle Provincial Park				48.7667°N 123.383°W
Sooke Mountain Provincial Park				48.439444444444°N 123.65861111111°W
Sooke Potholes Provincial Park	1972	Sooke Potholes Provincial Park		48.428°N 123.712°W
Wallace Island Marine Provincial Park	1990-11-09			48.9428°N 123.551°W

=== Comox Valley Regional District ===
Name	Established	Picture	Coordinates
Boyle Point Provincial Park	Aug 10, 1989		
Denman Island Provincial Park	2013-03-14		49.565277777778°N 124.81111111111°W
Fillongley Provincial Park			49.5439°N 124.762°W
Helliwell Provincial Park	1966		49.51666667°N 124.60555556°W
Kin Beach Provincial Park			49.7333°N 124.9°W
Kitty Coleman Provincial Park	1944-11-14		49.7889°N 124.996°W
Miracle Beach Provincial Park	1950		49.85°N 125.1°W
Mount Geoffrey Escarpment Provincial Park	2004		49.5069°N 124.684°W
Sandy Island Marine Park	Jun 7, 1966		
Tribune Bay Provincial Park	1978-11-02		49.5294°N 124.642°W

=== Cowichan Valley Regional District ===
Name	Established	Commons category	Picture	Coordinates
Bamberton Provincial Park	1960			48.6083°N 123.525°W
Carmanah Walbran Provincial Park	1991-03-13	Carmanah Walbran Provincial Park		48.65°N 124.65°W
Chemainus River Provincial Park				48.841°N 123.826°W
Cowichan River Provincial Park	1995-07-13			48.772222222222°N 123.89583333333°W
Eves Provincial Park	1962-02-15			48.861388888889°N 123.69833333333°W
Gordon Bay Provincial Park	1969-09-18			48.836°N 124.197°W
Hitchie Creek Provincial Park				48.7958°N 124.738°W
Koksilah River Provincial Park	1954-09-10			48.650555555556°N 123.72361111111°W
Memory Island Provincial Park	1945-08-23			48.6139°N 123.633°W
Nitinat River Provincial Park	1996-04-30			48.899722222222°N 124.5625°W
Spectacle Lake Provincial Park				48.5833°N 123.567°W
Wakes Cove Provincial Park				49.1236°N 123.702°W
West Shawnigan Lake Provincial Park	1979			48.6408°N 123.651°W
Whaleboat Island Marine Provincial Park				49.0667°N 123.7°W

=== Regional District of Nanaimo ===
Name	Established	Commons category	Picture	Coordinates
Arbutus Grove Provincial Park	1966-07-21			49.25°N 124.15°W
Drumbeg Provincial Park		Drumbeg Provincial Park		49.134°N 123.697°W
Englishman River Falls Provincial Park	1940	Englishman River		49.2475°N 124.352°W
Gabriola Sands Provincial Park				49.1942°N 123.859°W
Hemer Provincial Park	1981			49.1°N 123.833°W
Horne Lake Caves Provincial Park	1989	Horne Lake Caves Provincial Park		49.3444°N 124.758°W
Little Qualicum Falls Provincial Park	1940			49.2853°N 124.599°W
MacMillan Provincial Park	1947	MacMillan Provincial Park		49.29°N 124.661°W
Morden Colliery Historic Provincial Park	1972	Morden Colliery Historic Provincial Park		49.1°N 123.867°W
Petroglyph Park	August 24, 1948	Petroglyph Park		49.141111°N 123.926944°W
Pirates Cove Marine Provincial Park				49.096388888889°N 123.72583333333°W
Rathtrevor Beach Provincial Park		Rathtrevor Beach Provincial Park		49.323°N 124.27°W
Roberts Memorial Provincial Park	1980-05-22	Roberts Memorial Provincial Park		49.06666667°N 123.76666667°W
Rosewall Creek Provincial Park		Rosewall Creek Provincial Park		49.4542°N 124.775°W
Sandwell Provincial Park	1988			49.185°N 123.81694444444°W
Saysutshun (Newcastle Island Marine) Provincial Park	1961			49.1905°N 123.9347°W
Spider Lake Provincial Park	1981			49.343°N 124.632°W

=== Regional District of Mount Waddington ===
Name	Established	Commons category	Picture	Coordinates
Broughton Archipelago Marine Provincial Park	1992			50.6833°N 126.683°W
Cape Scott Provincial Park	1973-05-18	Cape Scott Provincial Park		50.7333°N 128.333°W
Echo Bay Marine Provincial Park	1971			50.75083333°N 126.49472222°W
God's Pocket Marine Park	Jul 12, 1995	God's Pocket Marine Park		
Lanz and Cox Islands Provincial Park				50.8083°N 128.667°W
Lower Nimpkish Provincial Park				50.5375°N 127.01111111111°W
Lower Tsitika River Provincial Park				50.458333333333°N 126.58888888889°W
Marble River Provincial Park				50.541666666667°N 127.52638888889°W
Nimpkish Lake Provincial Park				50.3389°N 127°W
Quatsino Provincial Park				50.49166667°N 127.81666667°W
Raft Cove Provincial Park	1990			50.5833°N 128.233°W
Schoen Lake Provincial Park	1977			50.1833°N 126.233°W
Woss Lake Provincial Park				50.1014°N 126.621°W

=== Strathcona Regional District ===
Name	Established	Commons category	Picture	Coordinates
Artlish Caves Provincial Park	1996-04-30			50.1667°N 126.917°W
Big Bunsby Marine Provincial Park	1996-04-30			50.1167°N 127.517°W
Bligh Island Marine Provincial Park				49.63333333°N 126.54166667°W
Brooks Peninsula Provincial Park		Brooks Peninsula Provincial Park		50.1397°N 127.783°W
Catala Island Marine Provincial Park				49.836111111111°N 127.05416666667°W
Dixie Cove Marine Provincial Park	1996			50.05°N 127.2°W
Elk Falls Provincial Park	1940			50.05°N 125.317°W
Gold Muchalat Provincial Park	1996			49.8661°N 126.1024°W
Háthayim Marine Provincial Park	1993			50.175°N 124.953°W
Homathko Estuary Provincial Park	1997			50.9375°N 124.842°W
Loveland Bay Provincial Park				50.05°N 125.45°W
Main Lake Provincial Park	1996-04-30			50.211111111111°N 125.21666666667°W
Mitlenatch Island Nature Provincial Park				49.95°N 125°W
Morton Lake Provincial Park	1966-11-28			50.125555555556°N 125.48472222222°W
Nuchatlitz Provincial Park	1996			49.8333°N 126.917°W
Octopus Islands Marine Provincial Park				50.27833056°N 125.22982222°W
Read Island Provincial Park	1996			50.1417°N 125.133°W
Rebecca Spit Marine Provincial Park	1959-07-07			50.1°N 125.18333333°W
Roscoe Bay Provincial Park	1989			50.1583°N 124.774°W
Small Inlet Marine Provincial Park	1996			50.2528°N 125.283°W
Smelt Bay Provincial Park	1973			50.0333°N 124.983°W
Strathcona Provincial Park	1911	Strathcona Provincial Park		49.8742°N 125.744°W
Strathcona-Westmin Provincial Park	1989			49.5647°N 125.553°W
Surge Narrows Provincial Park	1996-04-30			50.2333°N 125.15°W
Tahsish-Kwois Provincial Park				50.1833°N 127.15°W
Teakerne Arm Provincial Park				50.2014°N 124.843°W
Thurston Bay Marine Provincial Park	1970-04-23			50.3833°N 125.317°W
Walsh Cove Provincial Park	1989-08-10			50.2681°N 124.8°W
Weymer Creek Provincial Park				49.9°N 126.617°W
White Ridge Provincial Park				49.7783°N 125.974°W
White River Provincial Park				50.1414°N 126.034°W
