= Rendezvous Island South Provincial Park =

Provincial Park in British Columbia, Canada

- IUCN category II (national park)
- Location within Vancouver Island Location within British Columbia
- Interactive map of Rendezvous Island South Provincial Park
- Location: British Columbia, Canada
- Nearest city: Campbell River
- Coordinates: 50°15′39″N 125°02′00″W
- Area: 1.64 km^{2} (0.63 sq mi)
- Established: July 23, 1997
- Governing body: BC Parks
- Website: bcparks.ca/rendezvous-island-south-park/

Rendezvous Island South Provincial Park is a provincial park in British Columbia, Canada, located in the Rendezvous Islands in Calm Channel, to the east of the north end of Read Island in the Discovery Islands at the northern end of the Strait of Georgia region. The park contains a total of 164 ha. 113 ha. of it upland, 53 ha. of it foreshore.
