= Calm Channel =

Channel in British Columbia, Canada

- French: Canal Calme
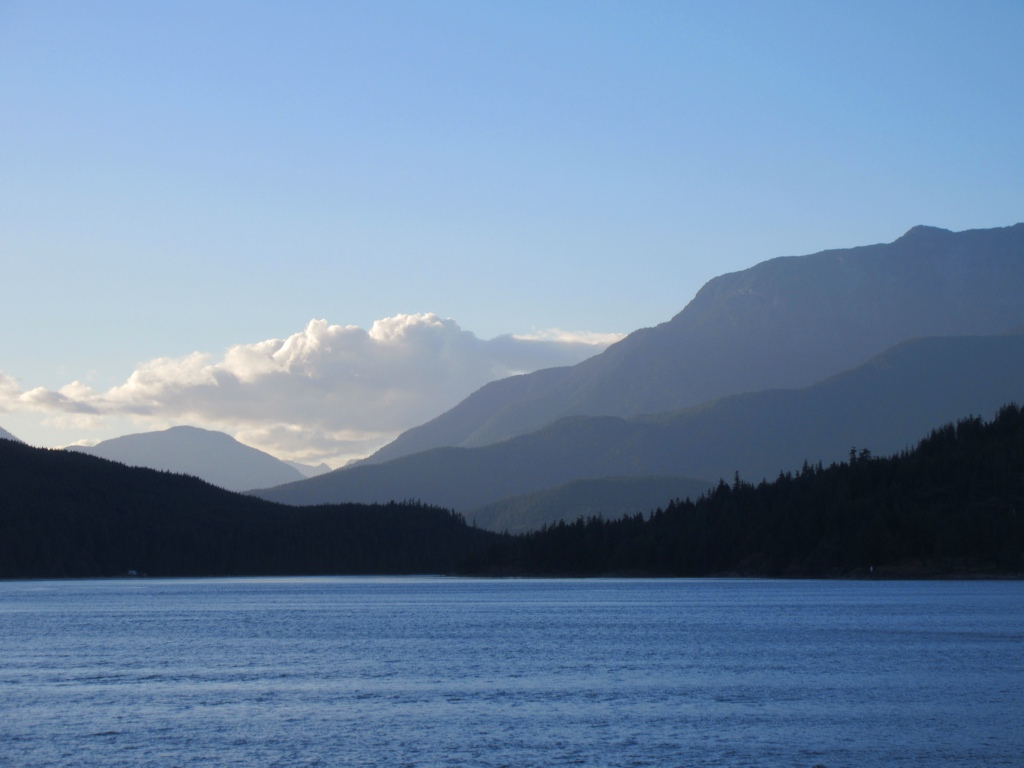
- Calm Channel

- Location within British Columbia

- Calm Channel surrounds the Rendezvous Islands (centre right)
- Location: Discovery Islands, British Columbia
- Coordinates: 50°17′51″N 125°03′48″W
- Type: Strait
- Primary inflows: Bute Inlet (north); Pryce Channel (east)
- Islands: Rendezvous Islands
- Sections/sub-basins: Drew Passage

Calm Channel is a channel located between several major islands of the Discovery Islands in British Columbia, Canada. The channel is an important waterway for boats transiting the archipelago.

== Geography ==
The channel is flanked by Maurelle Island, Raza Island, Read Island, Sonora Island, Stuart Island, and West Redonda Island. Adjacent waterways include Cordero Channel and Bute Inlet (to the north), Raza Passage and Deer Passage (to the east), Lewis Channel and Sutil Channel (to the south), Whiterock Passage (to the southwest), and Hole in the Wall (to the northwest).

The segment of Calm Channel between the Rendezvous Islands and the northern tip of Read Island is known as Drew Passage.

=== Hydrology ===
Water flows into Calm Channel primarily from Bute Inlet, and Pryce Channel via Deer Passage and Raza Passage. From Calm Channel, water flows outward with low velocity to various other channels and straits. Due to this predominantly south-moving water flow, Calm Channel is not officially considered part of the Salish Sea proper, but it is considered part of its watershed.
