= Read Island, British Columbia =

Read Island
- Location of Read Island in British Columbia
- Coordinates: 50°11′00″N 125°05′00″W
- Country: Canada
- Province: British Columbia
- Area codes: 250, 778

Read Island is an unincorporated locality and designated place on the east side of Read Island, near its south end, in the Discovery Islands region of the South Coast of British Columbia, Canada.

== See also ==
- Read Island Provincial Park
