= Miracle Beach Provincial Park =

Provincial park in British Columbia, Canada

- IUCN category II (national park)
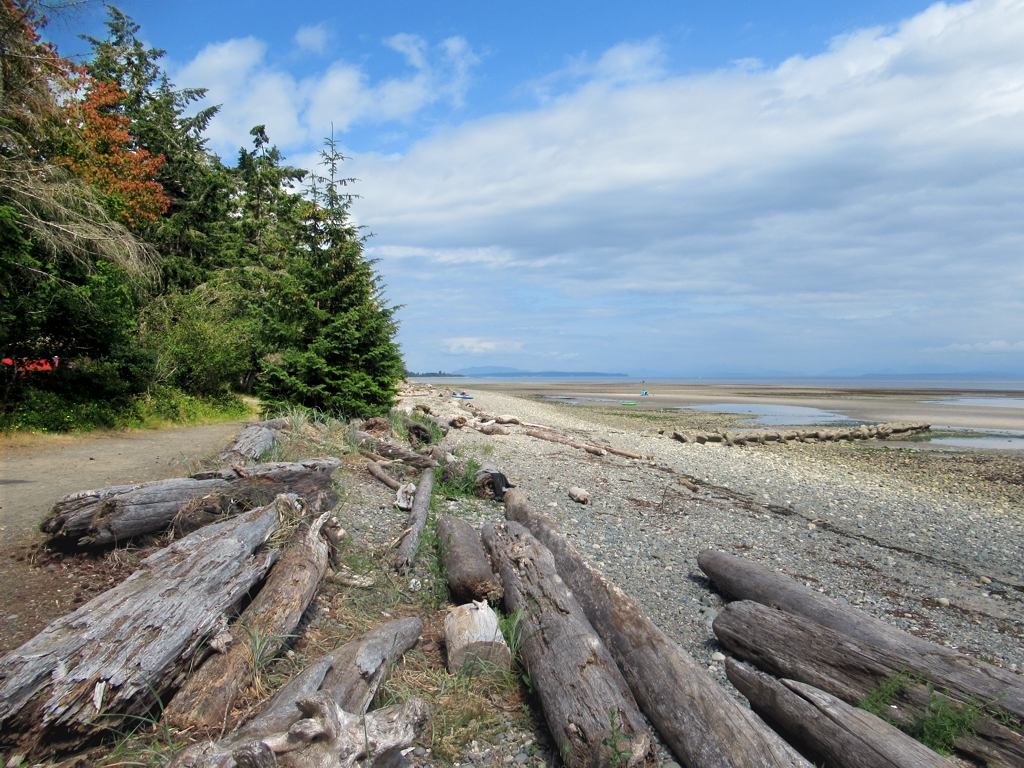
- Miracle Beach

- Location within British Columbia Location within Comox Valley Regional District
- Interactive map of Miracle Beach Provincial Park
- Location: Vancouver Island, British Columbia, Canada
- Nearest city: Campbell River, Courtenay
- Coordinates: 49°51′00″N 125°06′00″W
- Area: 137 ha (340 acres) upland: 109 ha (270 acres) foreshore: 28 ha (69 acres)
- Established: 1950
- Governing body: BC Parks

Miracle Beach Provincial Park is a provincial park on the eastern shore of Vancouver Island in British Columbia, Canada. Located between Comox and Campbell River, the park includes a foreshore area in the Strait of Georgia, much of the Black Creek estuary, and a forested area. According to its Master Plan, it fulfills primarily a recreational role with a focus on beach play, picnicking, nature appreciation, and camping, and a secondary conservation role with a focus on the natural shoreline and estuary. In support of its recreational focus the park is developed with a day-use parking area with accessible trails leading to the shoreline and a camping area with 200 drive-in sites. The park is also hosts a nature centre building and a sheltered group picnic shelter. Vegetation in the park is typical for the region's second-growth forests with Douglas-fir most prominent. Common associates include Western hemlock, Sitka spruce, red alder and bigleaf maple. Salal and sword fern are abundant in the understorey. Black Creek, which flows through the park, is a spawning area for coho salmon.

== History ==
Archaeological findings show that the Coast Salish used the area, though only one stone tool (a hammerstone) has been discovered within the park boundaries. The land was surveyed in 1886 and 1893 into individual lots for forestry use, primarily hemlock and fir, and it was all logged shortly after. A second cut was taken in the 1920s and 1930s. The property was purchased by a private citizen, Frank Pottage, in 1948 with the intention to subdivide and develop it for residential purposes. To achieve road access to proposed waterfront parcels, Pottage and the provincial government entered into an agreement involving the province purchasing 57.5 hectares for park purposes, 6 hectares at the mouth of Black Creek being gifted to the province, and the construction of a public road that would access both the park and the proposed residential lots. Miracle Beach Drive was constructed in 1952 and a year later, Seaview Road and the first set of residential lots were created adjacent to the park land. The provincial government officially established the Miracle Beach Provincial Park as a Class A park with 57 ha (140 acres) in 1950 with Order-in-Council 2259. The following year, an additional 35 ha (86 acres) south of the park was purchased from Pottage and added to the park. The foreshore component, which had remained crown land, was added to the park in 1956. A nearby property owner later donated 3 ha (7.4 acres) of wetland that drains into the Black Creek estuary to be added to the park as an exclave.

Several origins of the "Miracle Beach" name have been put forward. According to BC Geographical Names, it is the location where a messenger of the Great Spirit in the form of a lost and starving man was befriended by the We Wai Kai Other origins are that this is the place where the We Wai Kai witnessed a woman being turned to stone creating Mitlenatch Island, that this area was left untouched by a major forest fire that destroyed the surrounding areas, and that presence of several old growth trees despite forest fire and logging clearing the region is a miracle.

== Recreation and facilities ==
For recreational purposes, the park is used for beach enjoyment, swimming, nature appreciation, scenic viewing, picnicking and camping. There are two day-use parking areas off Miracle Beach Drive where there are numerous pedestrian and wheelchair accessible paths to the beach. The forested trail network runs parallel to the beach and to Black Creek with branches off to the parking and camping areas as well as the road. On the southern end of the beach there is an outdoor picnic area with a changehouse, flush toilet and water tap north of which there is a picnic shelter suitable for hosting groups or events. The Miracle Beach Nature House is a nature centre, constructed in 1958 and the second such nature centre constructed in a BC provincial park located in the park which features natural history displays and offers seasonal educational programs. Outside the Nature House is an amphitheatre with a projection screen.

Approximately 30 ha (74 acres) of the park is used as a campground with 197 vehicle accessible campsites. The campground is also developed with a shower building, a sani-station for disposing sewage from recreational vehicles and filling with drinking water, two playgrounds, a BMX pump-track, and several water taps and outhouses. As the park is within the service area of the regional water system, which includes the Oyster River area down to Seaview Road, the water taps provide treated drinking water. The campground is open from April to October with limited off-season camping in March and November. Park usage has increased over the decades with the expansion and addition of facilities from 54,211 day users and 14,183 campers in 1980 to 88,451 day users and 52,564 campers in 2015. Recent data (summer 2024) show that over 125,000 people used the park for day-use activities, while 43,276 people camped in the park.

== Geography and ecology ==
Miracle Beach Park comprises 137 hectares (340 acres), with approximately 665 m (2,182 ft) of shoreline along the Strait of Georgia on the east coast of Vancouver Island. The beach component of the park extends outward approximately 340 to 410 m (1,115 to 1,345 ft) from the shoreline to the tide's low water mark. The tide floods this sandy foreshore area twice daily. The extensive beach area is an intertidal sandbar, the result of coastal sediment transport from Williams Beach, and other nearby shorelines, driven by winds and waves from the southeast, as well as sediment from spilling out from Black Creek and Oyster River. Following this sediment transport pattern, the sands of Miracle Beach are being transported northward to Saratoga Beach. The shoreline is composed of a cobble and gravel surface with driftwood logs. Native species growing in the saline environment of the shoreline include gumweed, American dunegrass, Vancouver wildrye. The intertidal area is heavily trafficked by park visitors but animal life that can be found there include sand dollar, purple shore crab, green shore crab and green burrowing anemone. Coho Salmon swim up Black Creek from the sea in the fall.

The terrestrial portion of the park lies within what the province terms the Coastal Western Hemlock Biogeoclimatic Zone, based on the climax vegetation, in the very dry maritime subzone (CWHxm1). The air masses coming from the Pacific Ocean loses much of its moisture as it passes the Vancouver Island Ranges, resulting in this area experiencing warm summers with little rain but wet winters. This leads to western hemlock being the potential dominant tree species. However, in second-growth forest the most abundant tree is usually Douglas-fir. Western redcedar and grand fir grow in the drier nutrient-rich sites and red alder and bigleaf maple grow where disturbance has resulted in sun exposure, like along the borders of clearings. In the mature forest areas, shade-tolerant plants grown in the understory, such as red huckleberry, salal, Oregon grape, sword fern, and vanilla-leaf. Most of the park's soils were mapped as well-drained gravelly loamy sands or sandy loams (Dashwood-Shawnigan complex, mapped as "D-S") and classified as brown podzolic in a soil survey published in 1959. However, the abundance of bleached sand grains on forest trails is evidence of an albic horizon characteristic of podzols. More detailed soil surveys in the 1980s identified a coarse-textured classic podzol (Quennell series) in a strip adjacent to the beach but found considerable areas of silty and loamy Gleysols (Cowichan series) and Brunisols (Chemainus series) inland. Among the coarser soils, brunisolic Qualicum and Saturna series also occur along with the podzolic Kye series.

== See also ==
- List of provincial parks of Vancouver Island
- List of protected areas of British Columbia
