= Sutil Channel =

- French: Canal Sutil
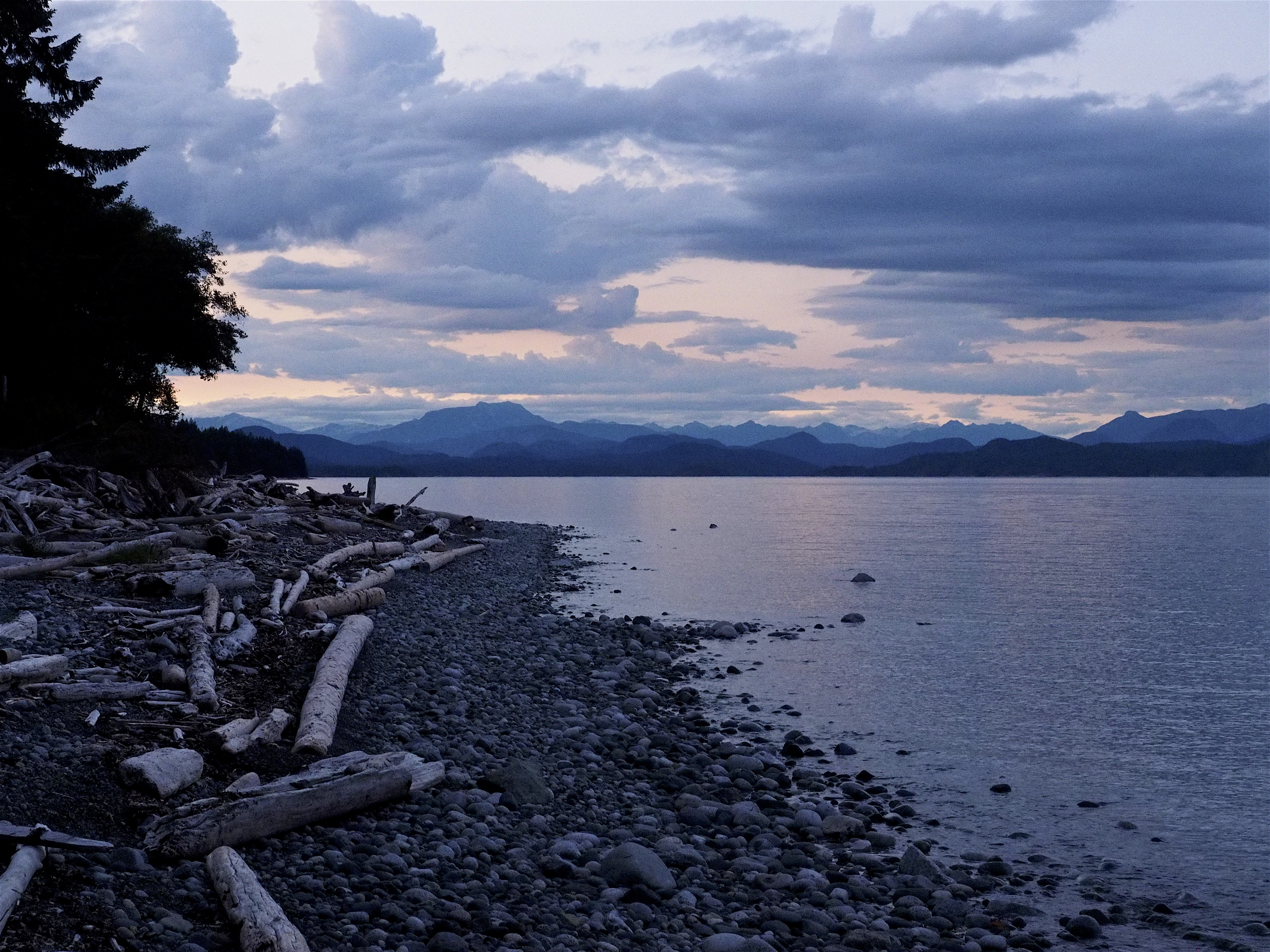
- Looking up Sutil Channel from Quadra Island

- Location within British Columbia

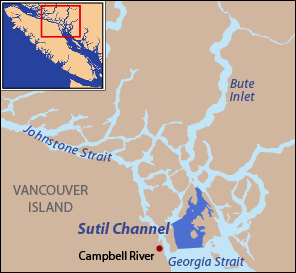
- Location of Sutil Channel among the Discovery Islands
- Location: Discovery Islands, British Columbia
- Coordinates: 50°8′N 125°4′W
- Type: Strait
- Ocean/sea sources: Salish Sea
- Islands: Coulter Island, Hill Island, Marina Island, Penn Islands

Sutil Channel (French: Canal Sutil) is a broad strait located in the Discovery Islands of British Columbia, Canada.

== Etymology ==
Sutil Channel was named around 1864 by Captain George Henry Richards in honor of the ship Sutil used by Dionisio Alcalá Galiano in exploring the region in 1792. A group of small islands in Sutil Channel called the Subtle Islands are named for Galiano's ship as well, translated to English.

== Geography ==
=== Extent ===
Sutil Channel is located between Cortes Island to the east, and Quadra Island and Read Island to the west. It connects Calm Channel to the north with the Strait of Georgia to the south. Hoskyn Channel branches off toward the northwest from the Sutil Channel between Read Island and Quadra Island. Von Donop Inlet branches off from the northern end of the channel to incise Cortes Island from the northwest.

The southern boundary of Sutil Channel, where it joins the Strait of Georgia, is defined as a line between Francisco Point, at the southeast end of Quadra Island, to Sutil Point, the southern end of Cortes Island. Sometimes Cape Mudge instead of Francisco Point is mentioned as the southern end of Quadra Island. The boundary between Sutil Channel and Hoskyn Channel is a line between Rebecca Spit on Quadra Island and Read Point on Read Island. Wide in the south, Sutil Channel narrows in the north, and merges with Calm Channel at the northernmost point of Cortes Island in the vicinity of the Rendezvous Islands. Settlements on the shore of Sutil Channel include Whaletown on Cortes Island. Desolation Sound, which strictly defined does not directly connect to Sutil Channel, is sometimes used loosely as all the waters north of Cape Mudge and Sarah Point, including Sutil Channel and Discovery Passage.

=== Major features ===
The major bays of Sutil Channel include Burwood Bay, Carrington Bay, Coulter Bay, Evans Bay, George Harbour, and Manson Bay. The major islands of Sutil Channel include Coulter Island, Hill Island, Marina Island, and the Penn Islands.

=== Hydrology ===
The Penn Islands of Sutil Channel delineate part of the northern limit of the Salish Sea.

== See also ==
- Discovery Passage
- Lewis Channel
- Homfray Channel
