= Errington, British Columbia =

Community in British Columbia, Canada

Coordinates: 49.283333°N 124.36666°W

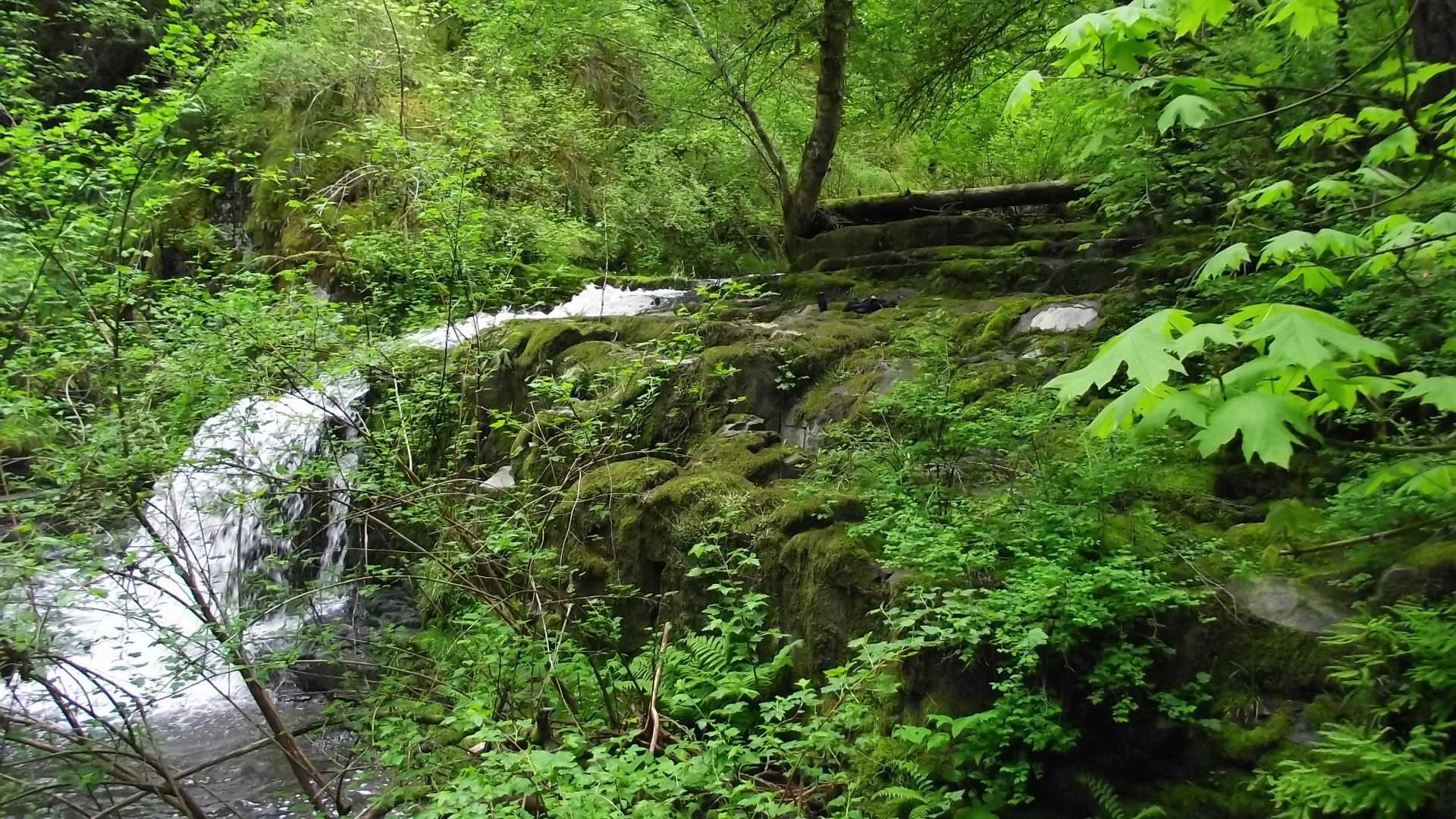
Triple Falls on Englishman River near Errington

Errington is a small community on Vancouver Island, British Columbia, Canada, located on Errington Road, off Highway 4, just south of Parksville and Qualicum Beach.

The unincorporated rural community is part of the Regional District of Nanaimo's Electoral Area F. In 2016, this rural residential and farming community had a population of 2,677. There is a designated village centre with a post office, general store, community hall, cemetery and other businesses.

Established in 1922, the Errington War Memorial Hall and adjacent park host such annual events as the seasonal Errington Farmers' Market, Hi Neighbour Day, Pumpkin Trail, vaudeville show, and craft sales in addition to a regular community coffee houses and a professional concert series.

Englishman River Falls Provincial Park and Englishman River Regional Park are adjacent to the community.

== History ==
=== Etymology ===
Duncan McMillan, an early resident, is said to have named the community from the poem "Jock of Hazeldean" by Sir Walter Scott. The poem refers to the village of Errington in Northumberland England.

=== European Settlers ===
In 1885, the first settlers in the area were Duncan McMillan and Alva Swayne. McMillan was Scottish and from Ontario. McMillan's log house still stands today.

In 1891, the Errington Post Office was opened. Duncan McMillan was the first postmaster.

In 1922, the Errington War Memorial Hall opened. It was financed through bazaars, donated materials, and volunteer labour.

In 1972, the Errington Farmers' Market was founded by Geraldine Shaw and her family. The market is open-air and located in the woods, with permanent wooden stalls.
