= Mount Arrowsmith Biosphere Region =

UNESCO Biosphere Reserve in British Columbia, Canada

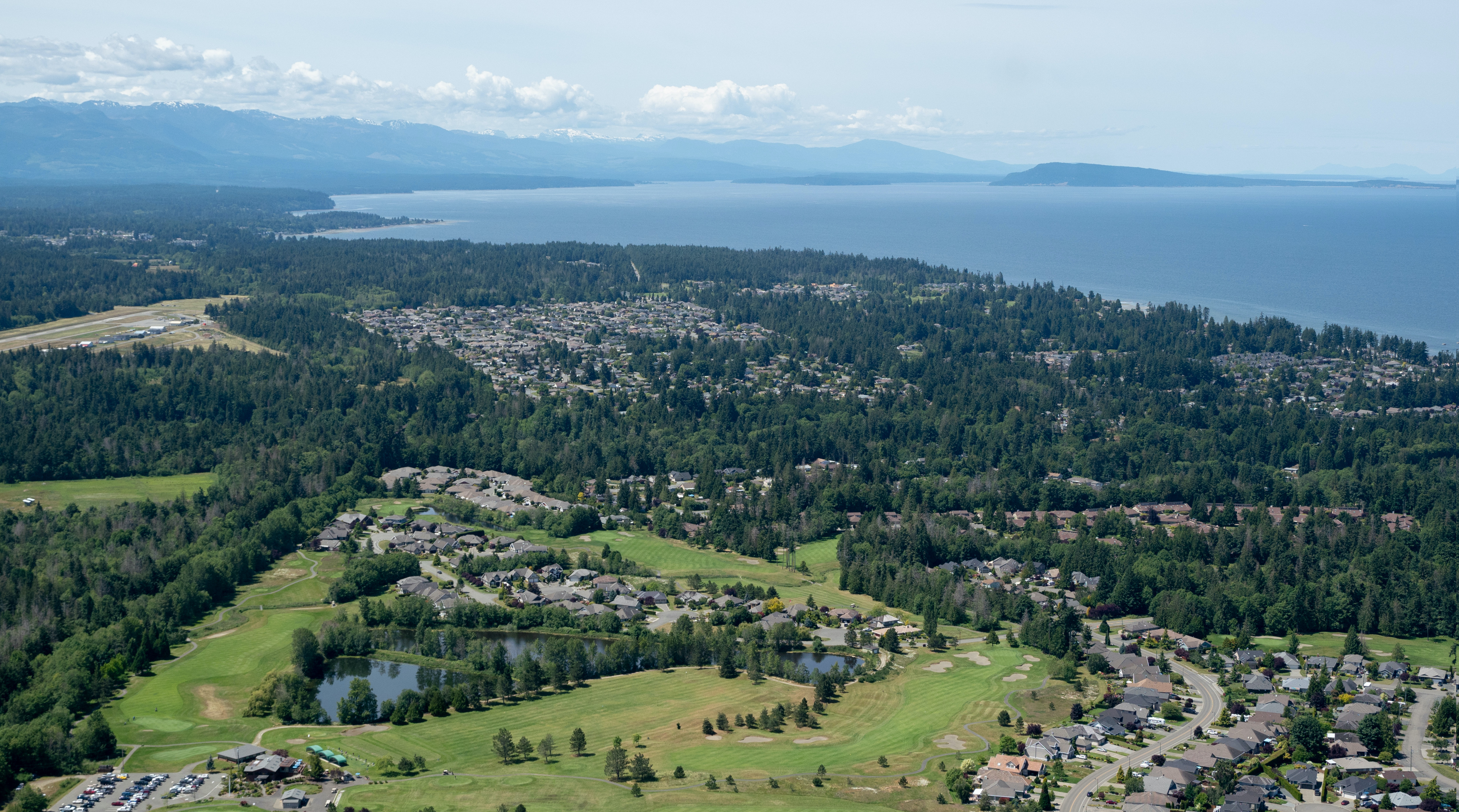
- Aerial view of Qualicum Beach and the northeastern coast of Vancouver Island

- Location within British Columbia Location within Canada
- Location: Vancouver Island, British Columbia, Canada
- Nearest city: Parksville
- Coordinates: 49°11′0″N 124°15′0″W
- Area: 118,592 ha (457.89 sq mi)
- Designation: UNESCO Biosphere Reserve
- Designated: 2000
- Governing body: Mount Arrowsmith Biosphere Foundation (2000–2013); Mount Arrowsmith Biosphere Region Research Institute (2014–Today)

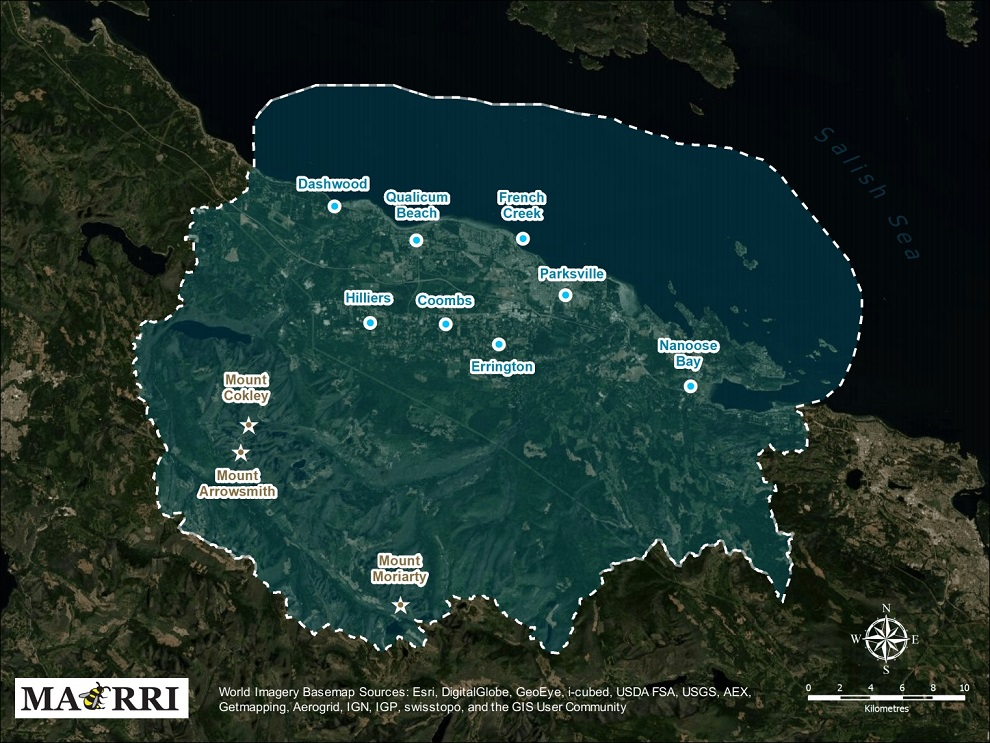
Map of the MABR

Mount Arrowsmith Biosphere Region (MABR) is a UNESCO Biosphere Reserve located on the east coast of Vancouver Island in British Columbia, Canada. It was designated in 2000 by UNESCO to protect a large second-growth coast Douglas fir ecosystem in the watersheds of the Little Qualicum and Englishman Rivers from being developed.

== History ==
=== Early history ===
The watersheds of the Little Qualicum and Englishman Rivers on the northeastern slope of Mount Arrowsmith were once home to a large old-growth forest dominated by coast Douglas fir. The forest was clearcut in the early 1900s but eventually rebounded as the trees matured. In the mid-1990s, local logging industries pressured the provincial government to permit clearcutting in the area as the trees neared their harvestable size. Local conservation groups protested additional logging of the recovering forest.

=== Establishment ===
In 2000, UNESCO, in cooperation with local conservation groups and the provincial government, designated the land in these watersheds a UNESCO Biosphere Reserve, protecting the forest from being clearcut.

In November 2008, the governing body of Alberni-Clayoquot Regional District in cooperation with local conservation groups established Mount Arrowsmith Massif Regional Park within the biosphere reserve to further protecting the forest from being clearcut.

=== Restructuring ===
In 2013, members of the Mount Arrowsmith Biosphere Foundation voted to dissolve the society and transfer management of the biosphere reserve to Vancouver Island University (VIU) and the City of Parksville.

In 2014, VIU established the Mount Arrowsmith Biosphere Region Research Institute, which is governed by representatives from the Qualicum First Nation, Snaw-naw-as First Nation, City of Parksville, Town of Qualicum Beach, Regional District of Nanaimo, BC Ministry of Environment and Climate Change Strategy, Vancouver Island Conservation Land Management Program, Island Timberlands, TimberWest, and VIU.

== Protected areas ==
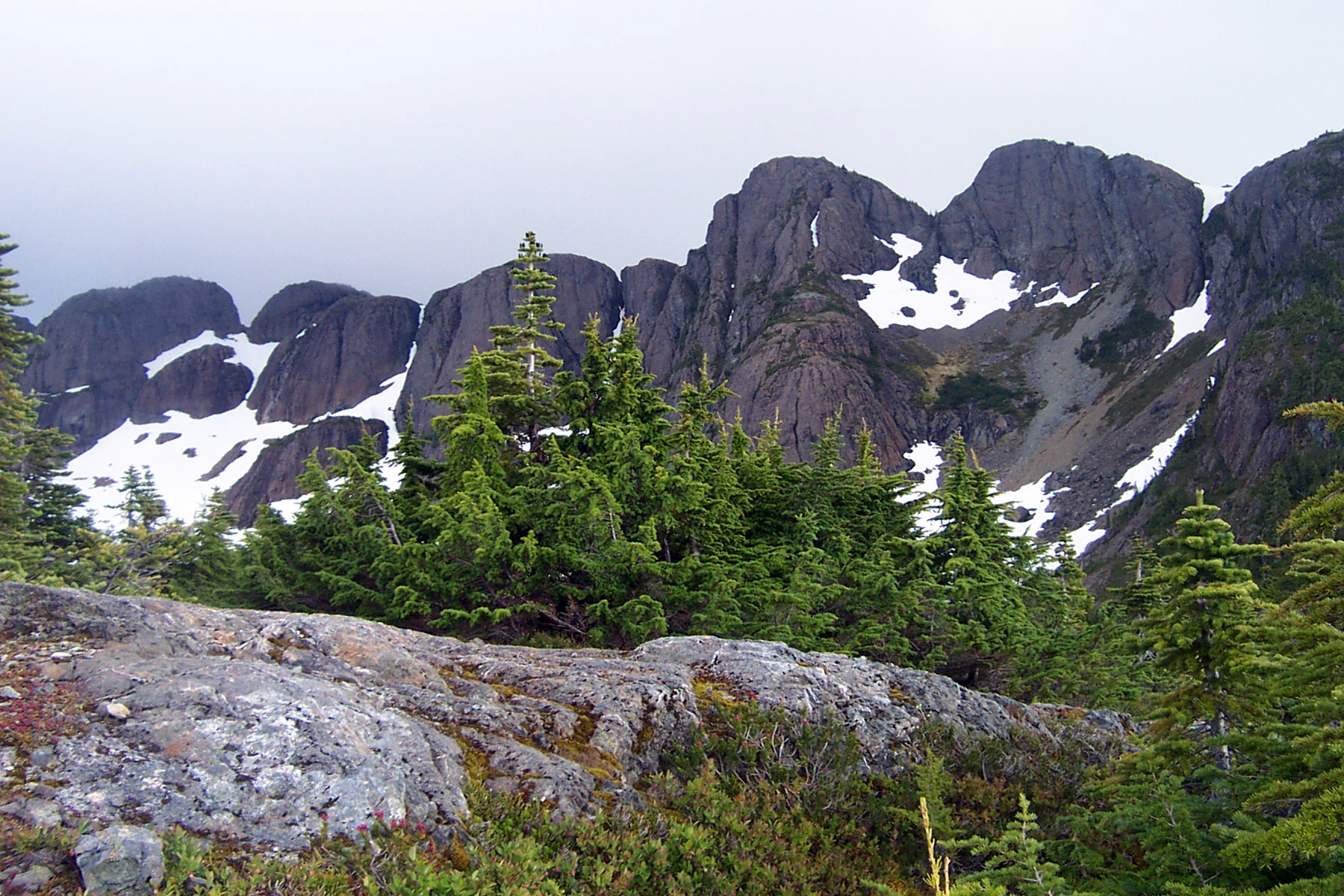
Mount Arrowsmith massif, northeast aspect

Protected areas located within the biosphere reserve include:

- Arbutus Grove Provincial Park
- Englishman River Regional Park
- Englishman River Falls Provincial Park
- Little Qualicum Falls Provincial Park
- MacMillan Provincial Park
- Mount Arrowsmith Massif Regional Park
- Qualicum National Wildlife Area
- Rathtrevor Beach Provincial Park
- Spider Lake Provincial Park

== See also ==
- Clayoquot Sound Biosphere Reserve
- List of UNESCO Biosphere Reserves in Canada
