= Octopus Islands Marine Provincial Park =

Provincial park in British Columbia

- IUCN category II (national park)
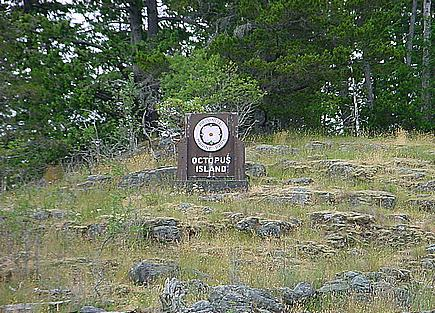
- Octopus Islands Marine Provincial Park sign

- Location within Vancouver Island Location within British Columbia
- Interactive map of Octopus Islands Marine Provincial Park
- Location: British Columbia, Canada
- Nearest city: Campbell River
- Coordinates: 50°16′04″N 125°13′37″W
- Area: 7.61 km^{2} (2.94 sq mi)
- Established: March 26, 1974
- Governing body: BC Parks

Octopus Islands Marine Provincial Park is a provincial park in British Columbia, Canada. It is located between Quadra Island and Maurelle Island in Okisollo Channel.
