= Nitinat River =

River in British Columbia, Canada

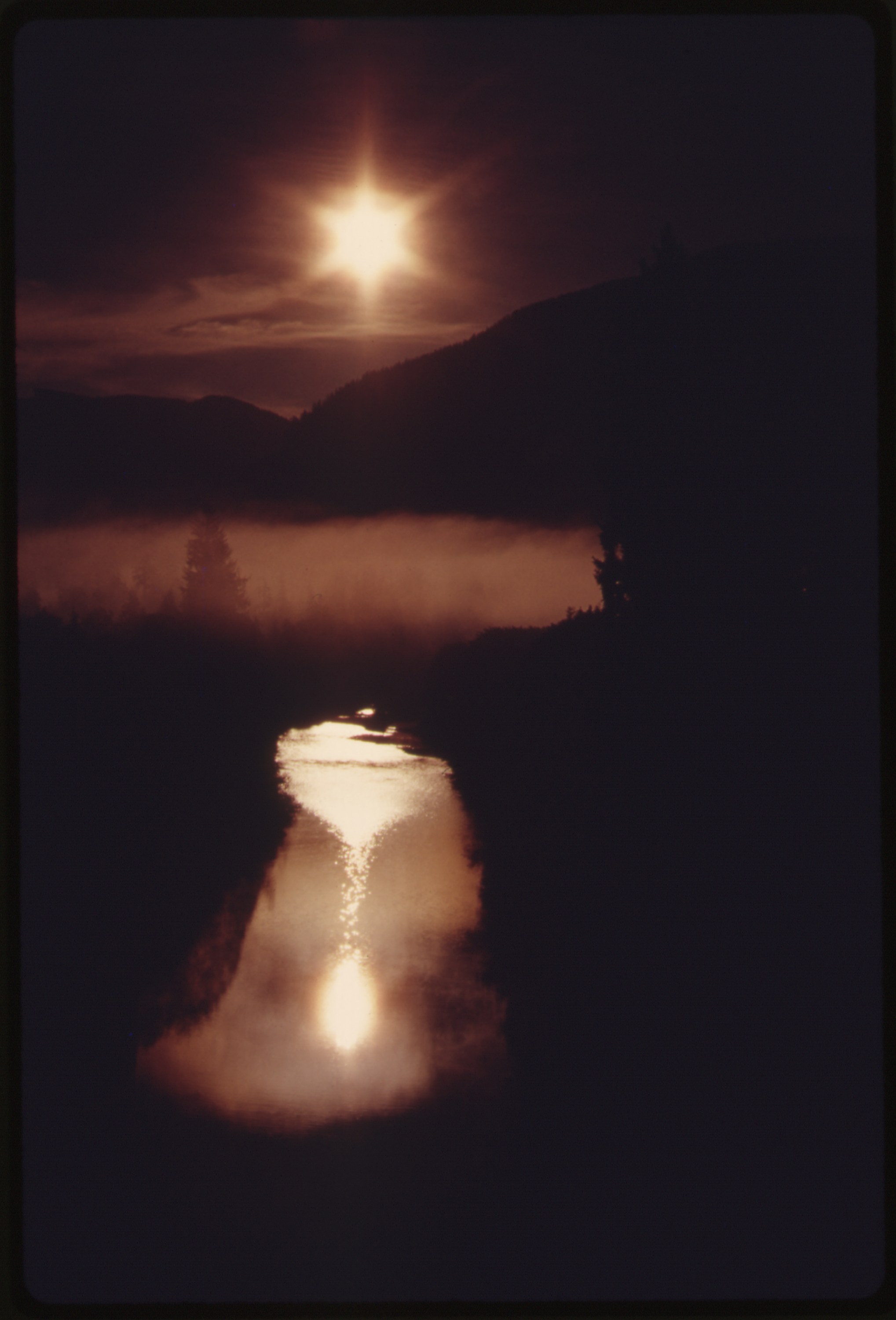
- An image of the Nitinat River near Port Alberni in 1974, captured for the DOCUMERICA collection.

- Location of river's mouth Nitinat River (British Columbia)

Location
- Country: Canada
- Province: British Columbia

Physical characteristics
- Source: McKinlay Peak
  - coordinates: 49°8′45″N 124°35′15″W
- Mouth: Pacific Ocean
  - location: Nitinat Lake
  - coordinates: 48°49′17″N 124°40′55″W
  - elevation: 0 m (0 ft)

Basin features
- Tributaries
  - left: Rift Creek; Parker Creek; Worthless Creek; Little Nitinat River
  - right: Vernon Creek; Granite Creek; Jasper Creek

Nitinat River is a river on the west coast of Vancouver Island in the Canadian province of British Columbia. Its source is in the Vancouver Island Ranges at McKinlay Peak. It travels in a south-west direction from its source until it meets Nitinat Lake at the Pacific Ocean.

Along the river's course there is a provincial park called Nitinat River Provincial Park and a fish hatchery called Nitinat Hatchery.

== See also ==
- List of rivers of British Columbia
