= Háthayim Marine Provincial Park =

Canadian provincial park

Háthayim Provincial Park
- IUCN category II (national park)
- Location within Vancouver Island Location within British Columbia
- Interactive map of Háthayim Provincial Park
- Location: Sayward Land District, British Columbia, Canada
- Nearest city: Campbell River, BC
- Coordinates: 50°10′24″N 124°57′30″W
- Area: 1,277 ha (3,160 acres)
- Established: December 2, 1993
- Governing body: BC Parks

Háthayim Marine Provincial Park, formerly Von Donop Marine Provincial Park, is a provincial park in British Columbia, Canada, located on the north end of Cortes Island in the Discovery Islands.

== History ==
The name Von Donop Marine Provincial Park was derived from that of Von Donop Inlet (Klahoose: ha̓θamɩn), which drains NW towards Sutil Channel from the northwest end of Cortes Island. The inlet was named in 1863 by Captain Daniel Pender for Victor von Donop, who was a midshipman on board the 21-gun HMS Charybdis, under Captain George Keane. The vessel had arrived at Esquimalt from China on March 23, 1862, with orders to protect the British colonies of the region at a time of mounting hostilities between Great Britain and the United States growing out of the Mason and Slidell affair resulting from the Trent Affair. Donop was later sub-lieutenant of HMS Duncan from 1865 to 1866. The 81-gun Duncan was the flagship of Vice-Admiral Sir James Hope of the North American Station, after whom Hope Island had been named in 1862. Donop later served as lieutenant-commander on the gunboat HMS Cromer, from 1875 to 1877.

Victor von Donop came from a distinguished naval and military family and was the eldest son of Captain Edward von Donop. While serving as lieutenant in command of the gunboat HMS Decoy, Donop drowned on February 12, 1881, after being swept off the bridge when the ship rolled heavily in a violent storm.

The park was renamed Háthayim Park in 1995, followed by a further change to Háthayim Marine Park in 1997 to honour the Coast Salish First Nations name for the area.
