= Nitinat River Provincial Park =

Provincial park in British Columbia, Canada

- IUCN category II (national park)
- Location within Vancouver Island Location within British Columbia
- Interactive map of Nitinat River Provincial Park
- Location: Vancouver Island, British Columbia, Canada
- Coordinates: 48°53′53″N 124°33′29″W
- Area: 160 ha (400 acres)
- Established: April 30, 1996
- Governing body: BC Parks

Nitinat River Provincial Park is a provincial park in the Canadian province of British Columbia on Vancouver Island.

The 160-hectare park is on the Nitinat River, upstream from Nitinat Lake, and has no developed camping or day-use facilities. Access is by an unmaintained trail from Nitinat Road. The nearest communities are Port Alberni, Lake Cowichan, and Port Renfrew.

The park is divided into two parcels about 9 kilometres apart along the course of Nitinat River. The western most portion is called Bridge Pool and is accessed from the bridge that crosses the Nitinat River. This parcel is located upstream from Little Nitinat River and downstream from Jasper Creek. The other parcel is located farther upstream at the point where Granite Creek meets the Nitinat River. This parcel is not intended for recreational use.

== See also ==
- List of British Columbia Provincial Parks
- List of protected areas of British Columbia
