= Rathtrevor Beach Provincial Park =

Provincial park in British Columbia, Canada

- IUCN category II (national park)
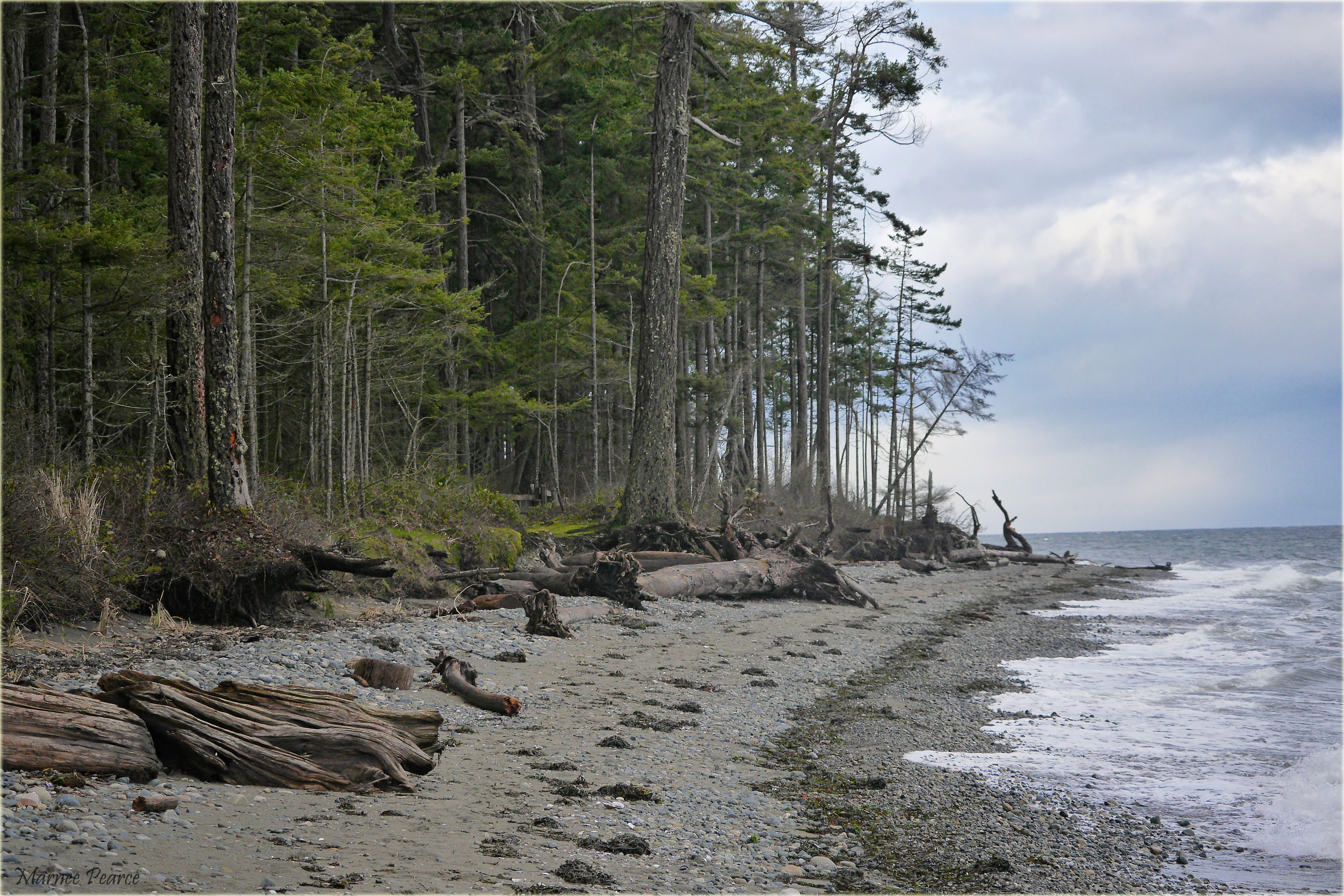
- Rathtrevor Beach Provincial Park

- Location within Vancouver Island Location within British Columbia
- Interactive map of Rathtrevor Beach Provincial Park
- Location: Parksville, British Columbia, Canada
- Coordinates: 49°19′23″N 124°16′12″W
- Area: 347 ha (860 acres)
- Established: 20 April 1967
- Visitors: 836,211 (in 2017-18)
- Governing body: BC Parks

Rathtrevor Beach Provincial Park is a provincial park in Parksville, British Columbia, Canada. Located at the east end of the town, the 347-hectare park features a two-kilometre long stretch of sandy beach, a stand of old-growth Douglas fir trees and 250 vehicle-accessible and 25 walk-in camping spaces. Popular year-round, the park is easily accessible from Highway 19. The sandy beach is the main attraction. At low tide, it stretches nearly a kilometre out into the Strait of Georgia.

== Wildlife ==
The park is an important stopover area for migratory birds, notably brant geese, which use the beach as a staging area from March 1 to April 15. Deer, raccoons, minks and squirrels have been seen occupying the park during spring migrations. Furthermore, aquatic animals such as otters use the park.

== Origin of the name ==
Rathtrevor takes its name from the Rath family who homesteaded on the land in the late 19th century. The family eventually established a private campground on the site, adding the "trevor" to give it a more romantic name. In 1967, the campground became a provincial park.

== Establishment of the park ==
Rathtrevor Beach Park has a connection to Wells Gray Provincial Park in central British Columbia, Canada. In the 1960s, Clearwater Timber Products, a major employer in Clearwater, just outside Wells Gray Park, was running out of timber to supply the mill. On October 3, 1963, the Social Credit Government passed an order-in-council which stated the terms of an agreement between the government and Clearwater Timber whereby the government received 47 hectares of Rathtrevor Beach, owned by Clearwater Timber Products, in exchange for timber rights in 137 square km of southwestern Wells Gray Park. The beach property was valued at $186,000, so the approved swap allowed for that value of timber to be removed from Wells Gray Park. However, the stumpage fee was fixed at $1.50 per 100 cubic feet for fir, an extremely low price because the standard rate paid by a logging company to the government was $16.90.

An investigation of the deal in 1964 disclosed that the Rath family actually sold their property to Clearwater Timber Products in 1963 for only $150,000, yet within a month the government appraised the property at $186,000. An editorial in the Victoria Daily Times on March 24, 1964, pointed out that “the amount allocated by the government as the value of bargain-priced timber was equivalent to the highest appraisal made on the Rathtrevor property”. Despite the suspicions raised by this investigation, the government granted an additional 65 square km of timber rights to Clearwater Timber in 1964, so its holdings now extended from north of the Flourmill Volcanoes to Mahood Lake.

On April 1, 1969, Bob Williams (a Member of the Legislative Assembly or M.L.A.) told the Legislature, "It seems questionable that a licence should be granted for the company to run at will through Wells Gray Park at bargain basement prices." Former Kamloops M.L.A., Phil Gaglardi, was accused of using his position as Highways Minister to interfere with the Department of Recreation and Conservation in the land swap and thus secure approval for the deal. Williams summarized the loss to the government by pointing out that 204,000 cubic metres (7.2 million cubic feet) of timber had already been cut, yielding $88,000 in stumpage fees applied to the Rathtrevor purchase. The logging company was nearly halfway through the deal in 1969. Up to that year, the government could have collected a total of $670,613 on stumpage fees, or $l.6 million if the deal had been completed, instead of the $186,000 park site it did acquire. Williams called the arrangement “a glaring example of park mismanagement mixed with outside interference. What we are looking at is between 50 and 60 Stanley Parks. What British Columbia, the public, is being left with is stumps.”

By 1974, two years after the New Democratic Party had formed the government, the arrangement with Clearwater Timber was cancelled and the access road to the Flourmill Volcanoes logging area was permanently closed by demolishing the Mahood River bridge. In the 40 years since, Rathtrevor Beach has become one of British Columbia's most popular provincial campgrounds.

== Rathtrevor Beach Nature House ==
Rathtrevor Beach Nature House is a nature centre located in the park and operated by RLC Enterprize. The centre features natural history displays and offers seasonal environmental education programs for school groups and the general public.

== Gallery ==
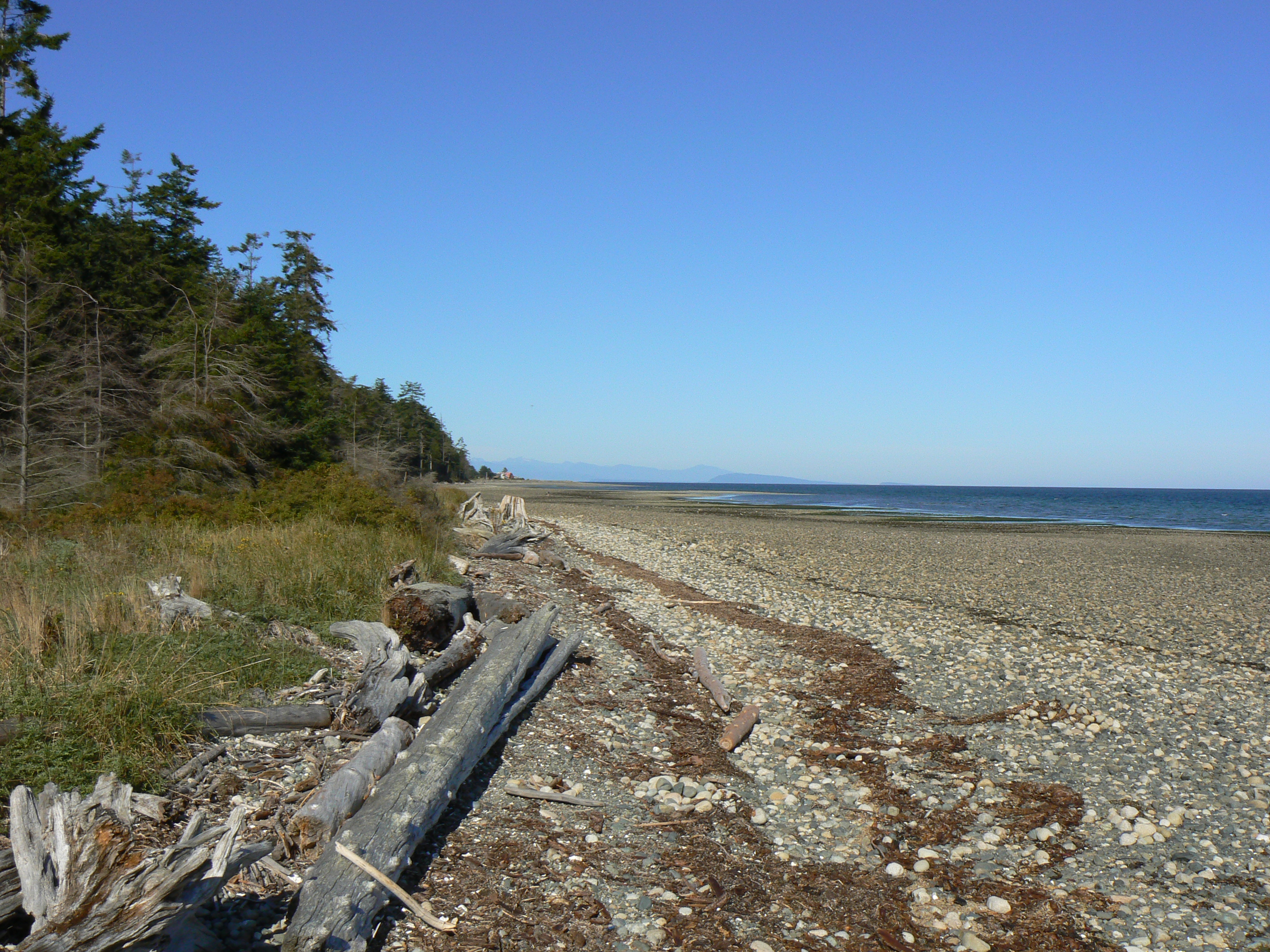
the beach

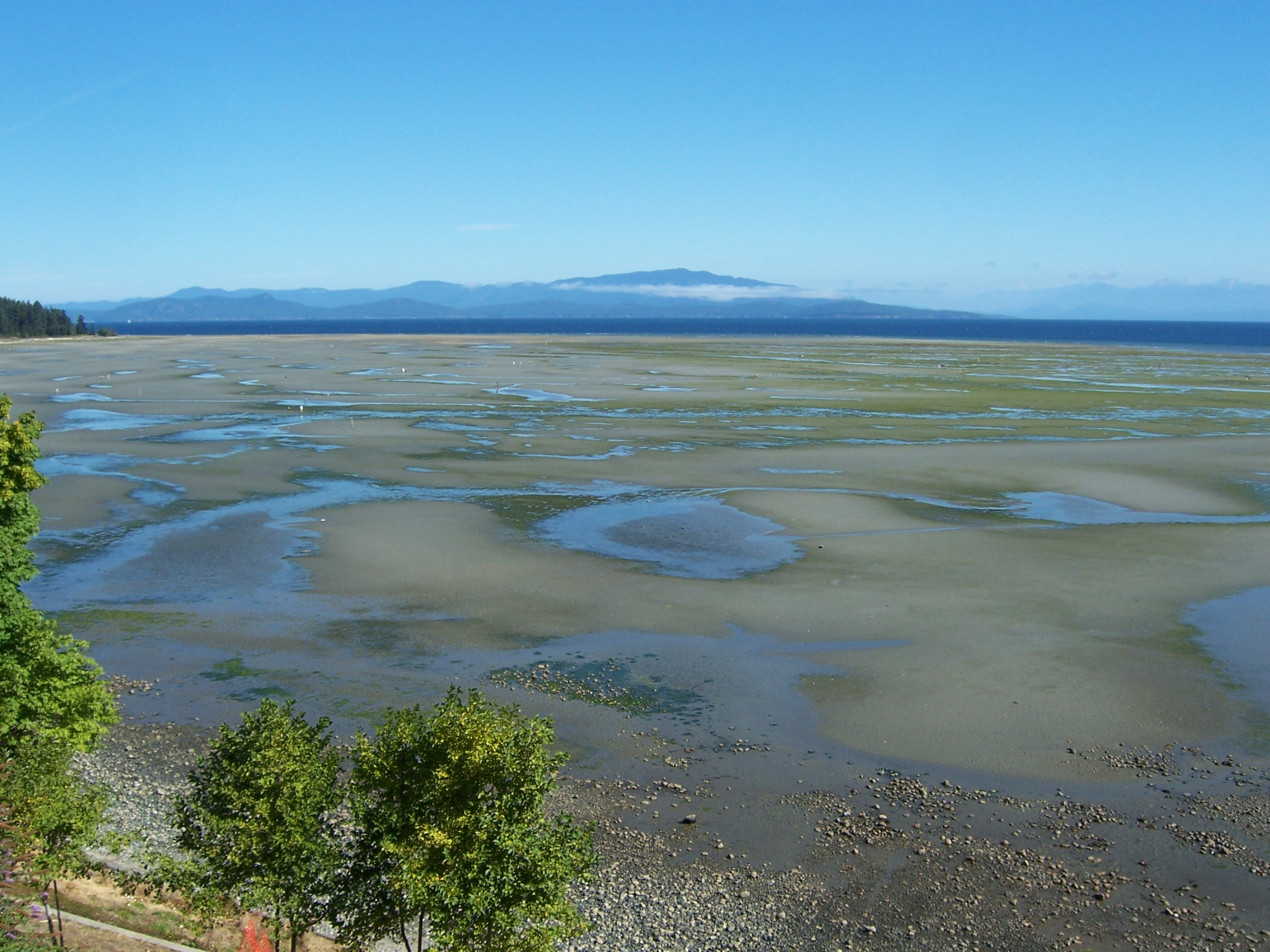
low tide

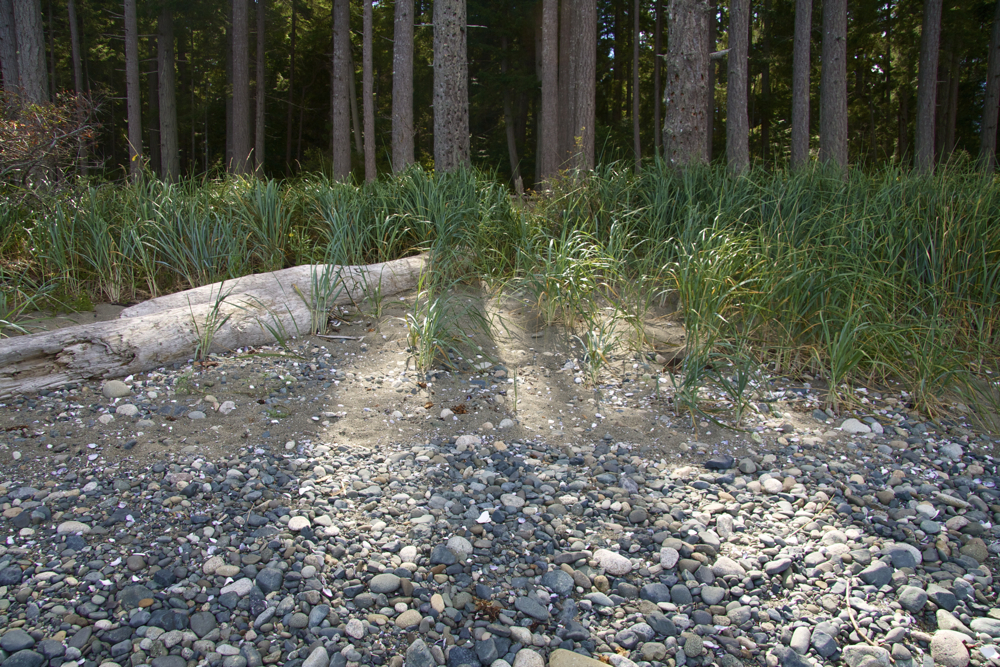
grass in the sand

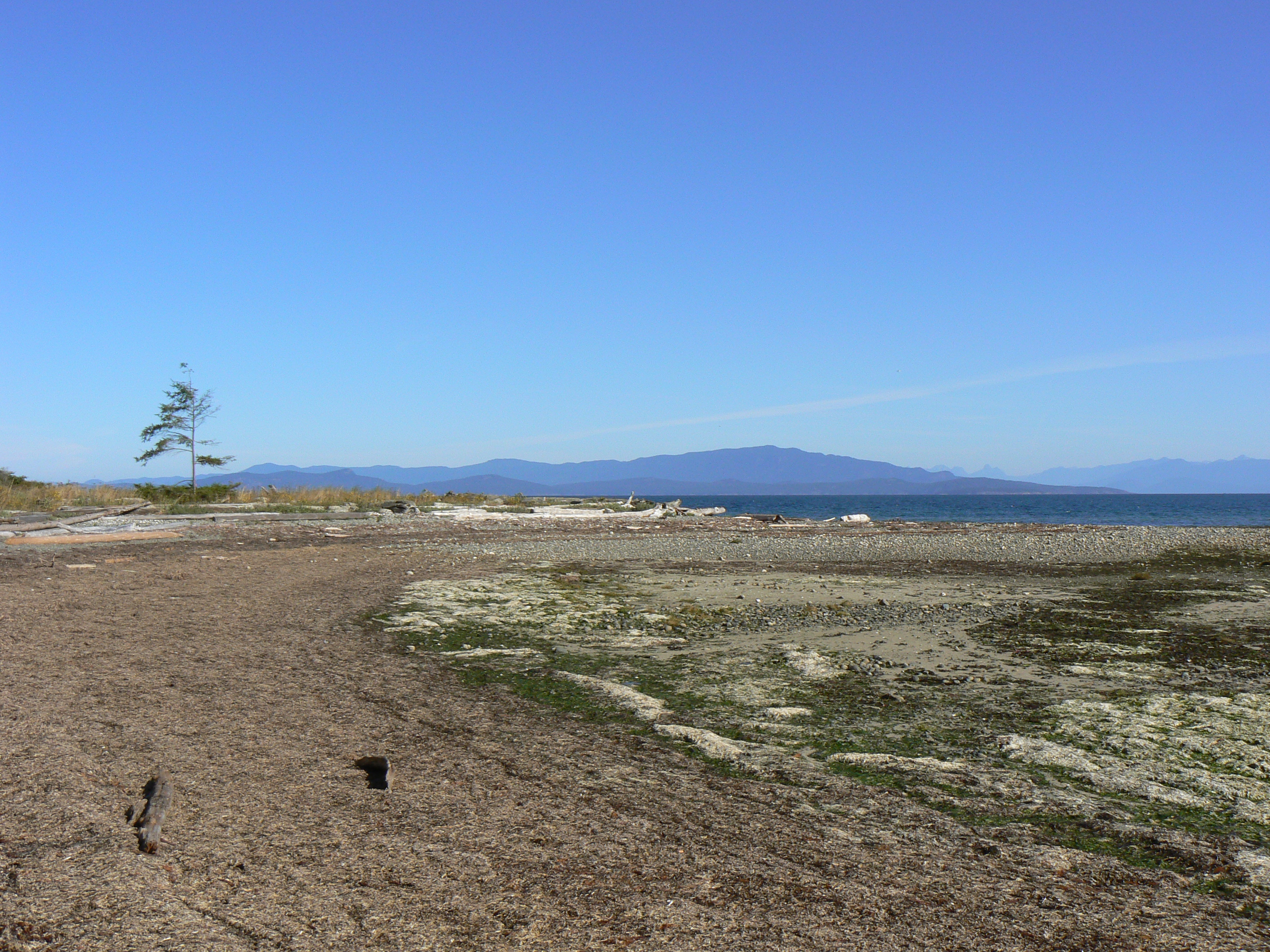
Lasqueti Island and the mainland Coast Mountains in the distance

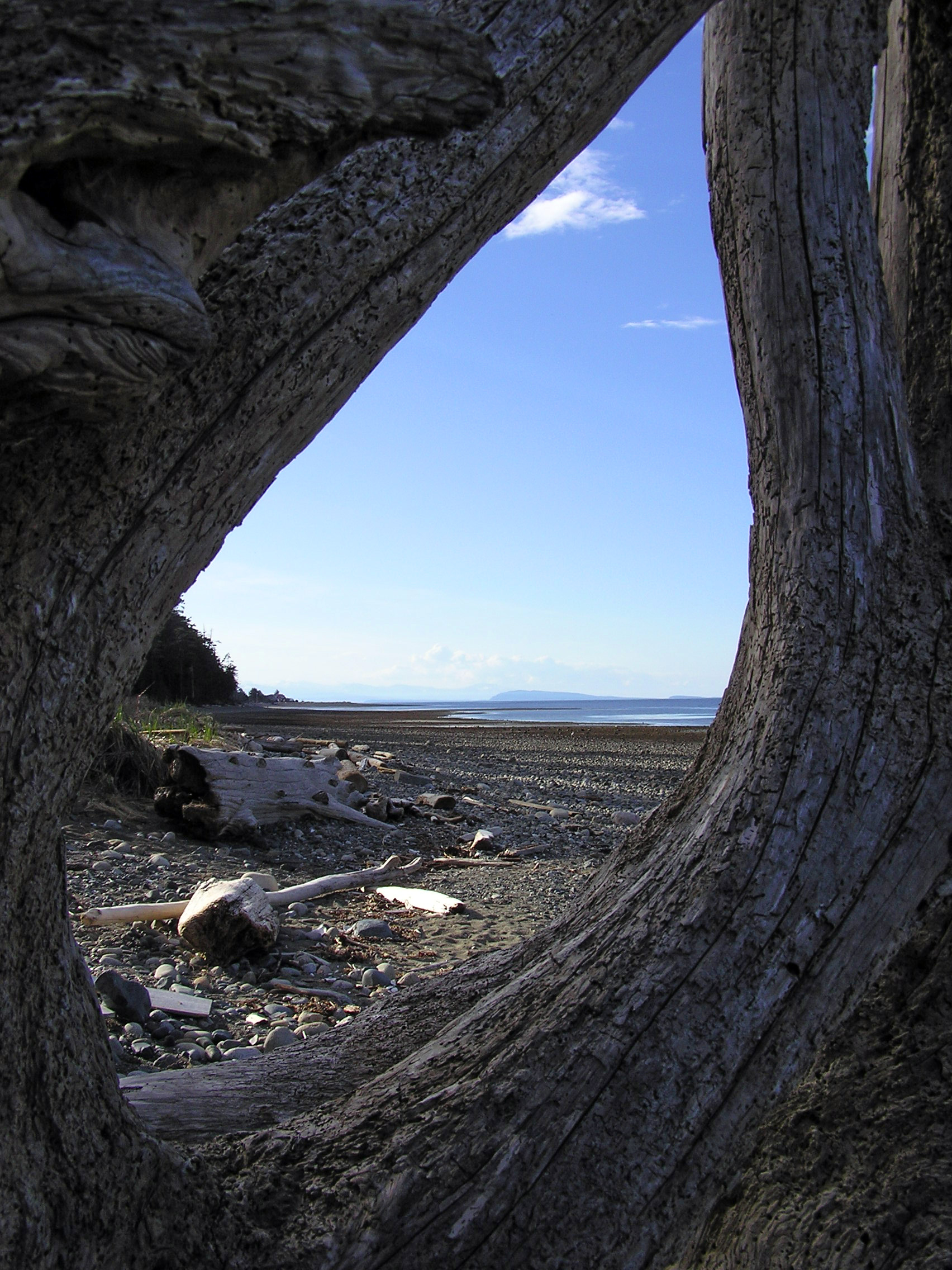
driftwood

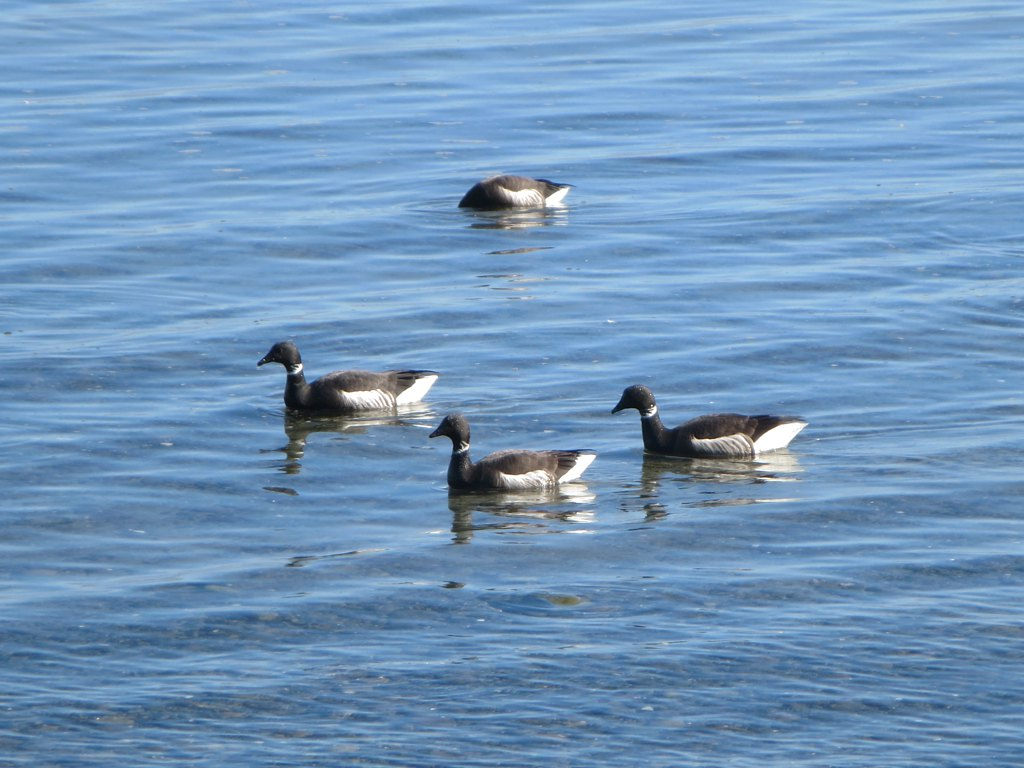
Brant Geese

== See also ==
- Mount Arrowsmith Biosphere Region
