= Rosewall Creek Provincial Park =

Provincial park in British Columbia, Canada

- IUCN category II (national park)
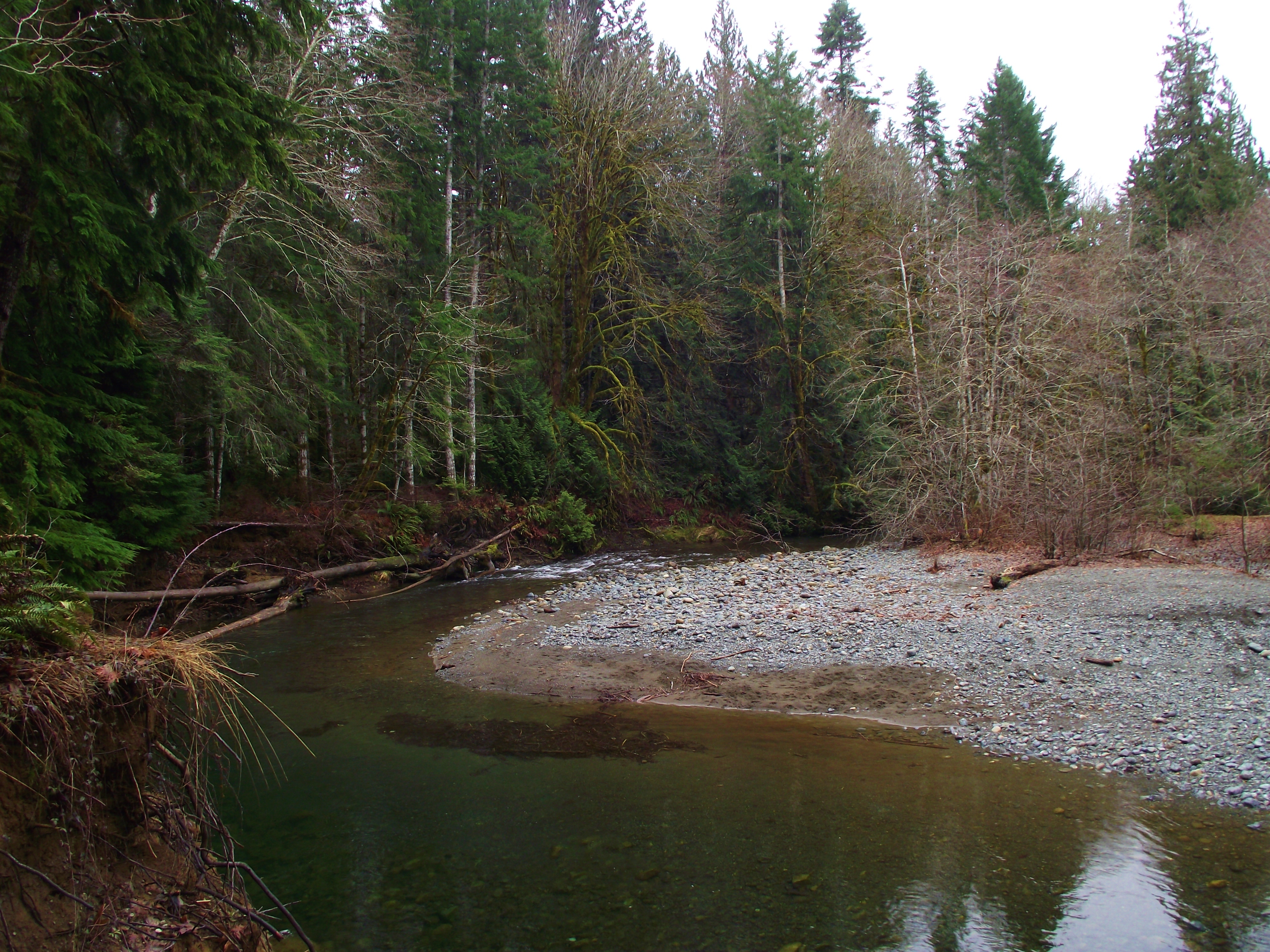
- Rosewall Creek from a picnic area within the park

- Location within British Columbia Location within Comox Valley Regional District
- Interactive map of Rosewall Creek Provincial Park
- Location: Comox Valley RD, British Columbia, Canada
- Coordinates: 49°27′15″N 124°46′30″W
- Area: 54.3 ha (134 acres)
- Established: May 14, 1956
- Governing body: BC Parks

Rosewall Creek Provincial Park is a provincial park in British Columbia, Canada, located northwest of the community of Bowser. The park is situated along picturesque Rosewall Creek, south of Fanny Bay on central Vancouver Island. The park features a mixture of coniferous trees interspersed with striking broad leaf maple trees. One of the best times to visit this park is in the fall when the colour of the maple leaves makes an attractive backdrop for photographers.

== Facilities ==
This small day-use only park incorporates the Lieutenant Ian Philip MacDonald Picnic Area (managed by BC Parks), honouring a soldier from nearby Fanny Bay who was killed in WWII's Normandy Invasion (see photo for details). Two picnic areas on either side of the creek are connected by a short riverside trail; one overlooks the creek and the other is situated at its edge.

== Access ==
The area is served by the coast-spanning Island Highway, and the Island Rail Corridor.

== Gallery ==
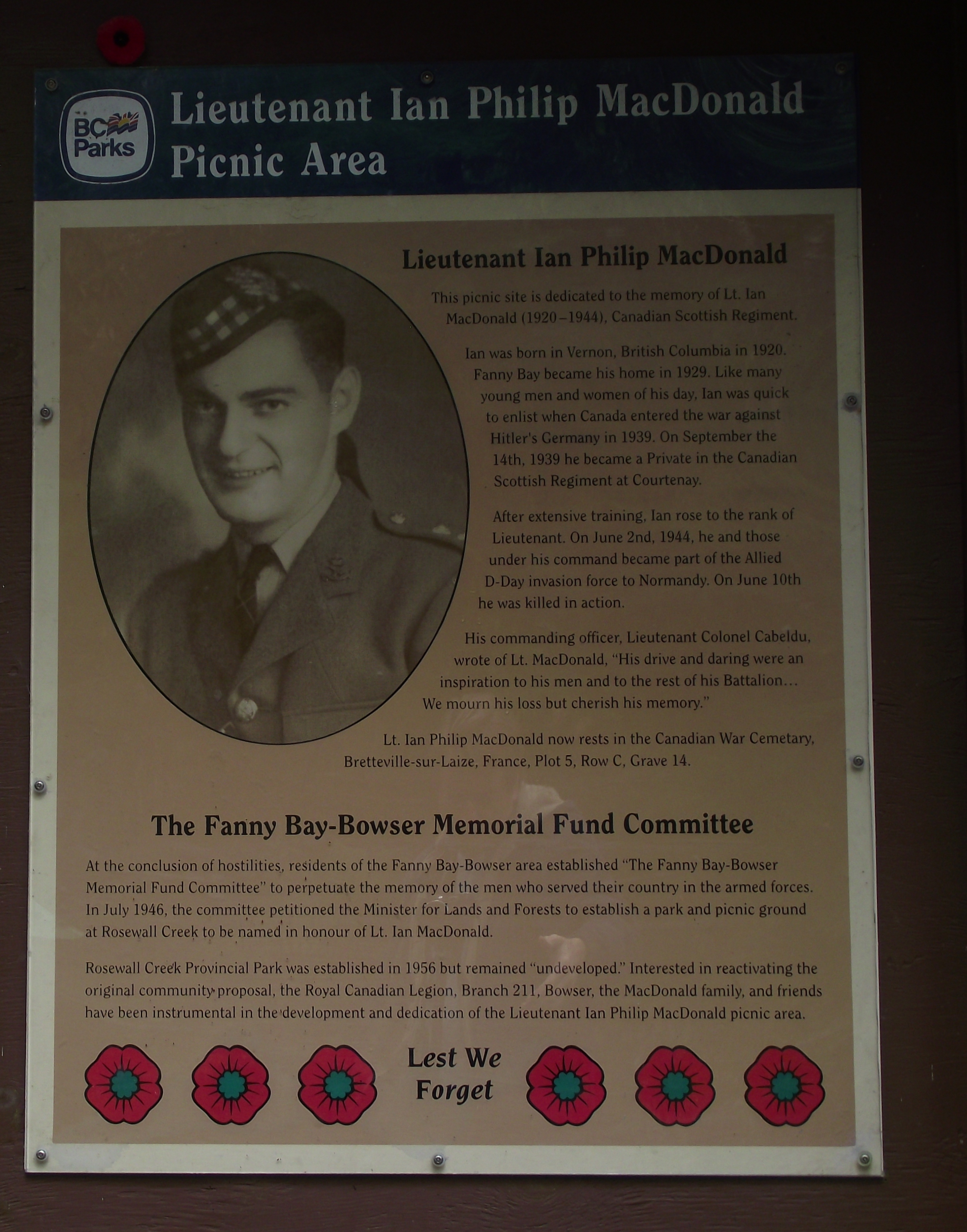
Plaque within Lieutenant Ian Philip MacDonald Picnic Area
