= Surge Narrows Provincial Park =

Provincial park in British Columbia, Canada

- IUCN category II (national park)
- Location within Vancouver Island Location within British Columbia
- Interactive map of Surge Narrows Provincial Park
- Location: British Columbia, Canada
- Nearest city: Campbell River
- Coordinates: 50°14′00″N 125°09′00″W
- Area: 5.15 km^{2} (1.99 sq mi)
- Established: April 30, 1996
- Governing body: BC Parks

Surge Narrows Provincial Park is a provincial park in British Columbia, Canada, located on the south tip of Maurelle Island and on adjacent islands in the Discovery Islands archipelago in that province's South Coast region.
