= Spider Lake Provincial Park =

Provincial park in British Columbia, Canada

- IUCN category II (national park)
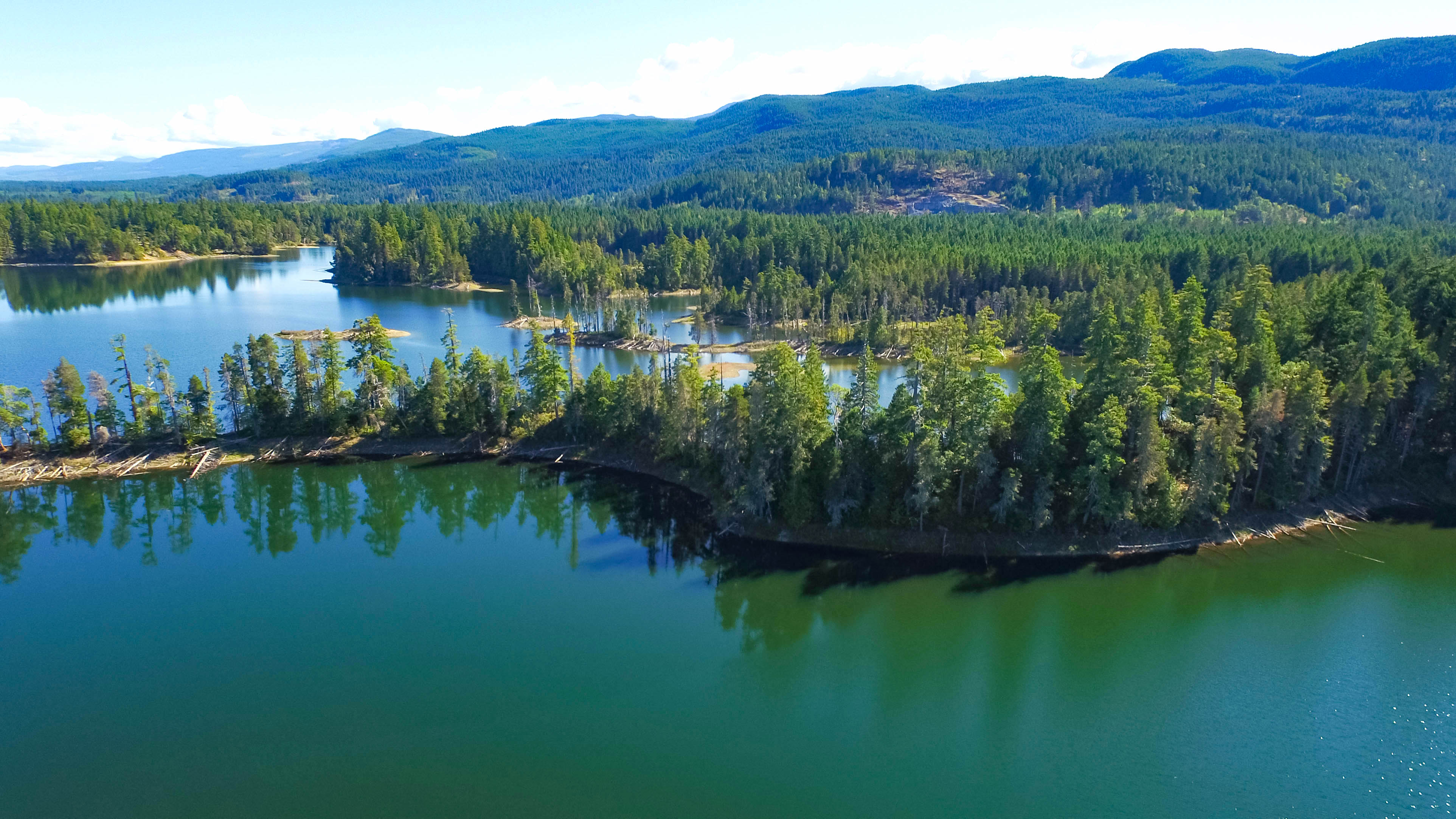
- Aerial view of Spider Lake

- Location within Vancouver Island Location within British Columbia
- Interactive map of Spider Lake Provincial Park
- Location: Nanaimo RD, British Columbia, Canada
- Nearest town: Qualicum Beach
- Coordinates: 49°20′35″N 124°37′55″W
- Area: 64.59 ha (159.6 acres)
- Governing body: BC Parks

Spider Lake Provincial Park is a provincial park located on Vancouver Island in British Columbia, Canada. It was established on June 18, 1981, to protect the ecological integrity of the lake and to provide day use visitors with recreational facilities.

The park is located within the larger Mount Arrowsmith Biosphere Region.
