= Nitinat Lake =

Lake in British Columbia

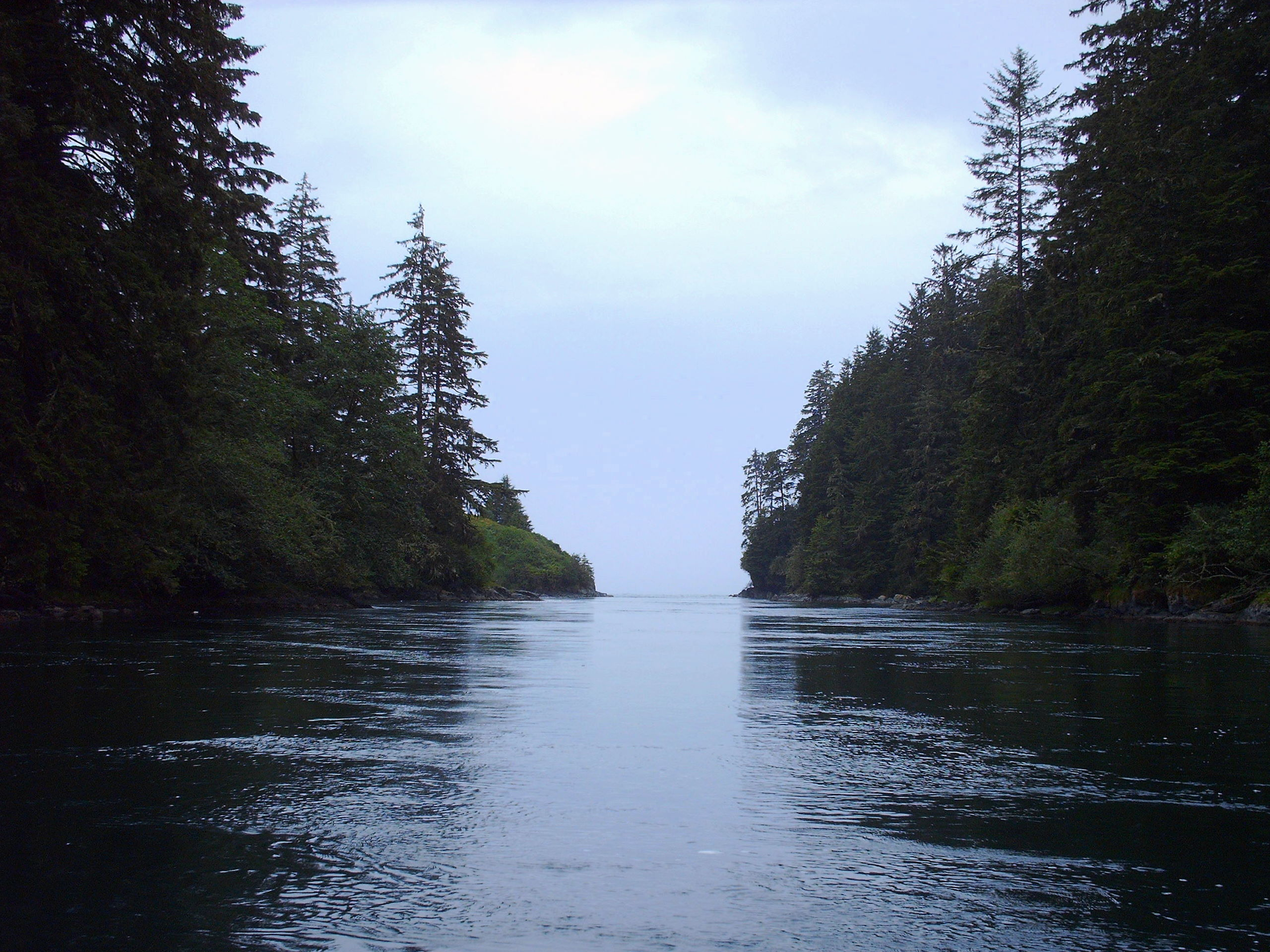
- Looking southwest towards the Pacific Ocean from the Nitinat Lake narrows

- Location in British Columbia Nitinat Lake (British Columbia)

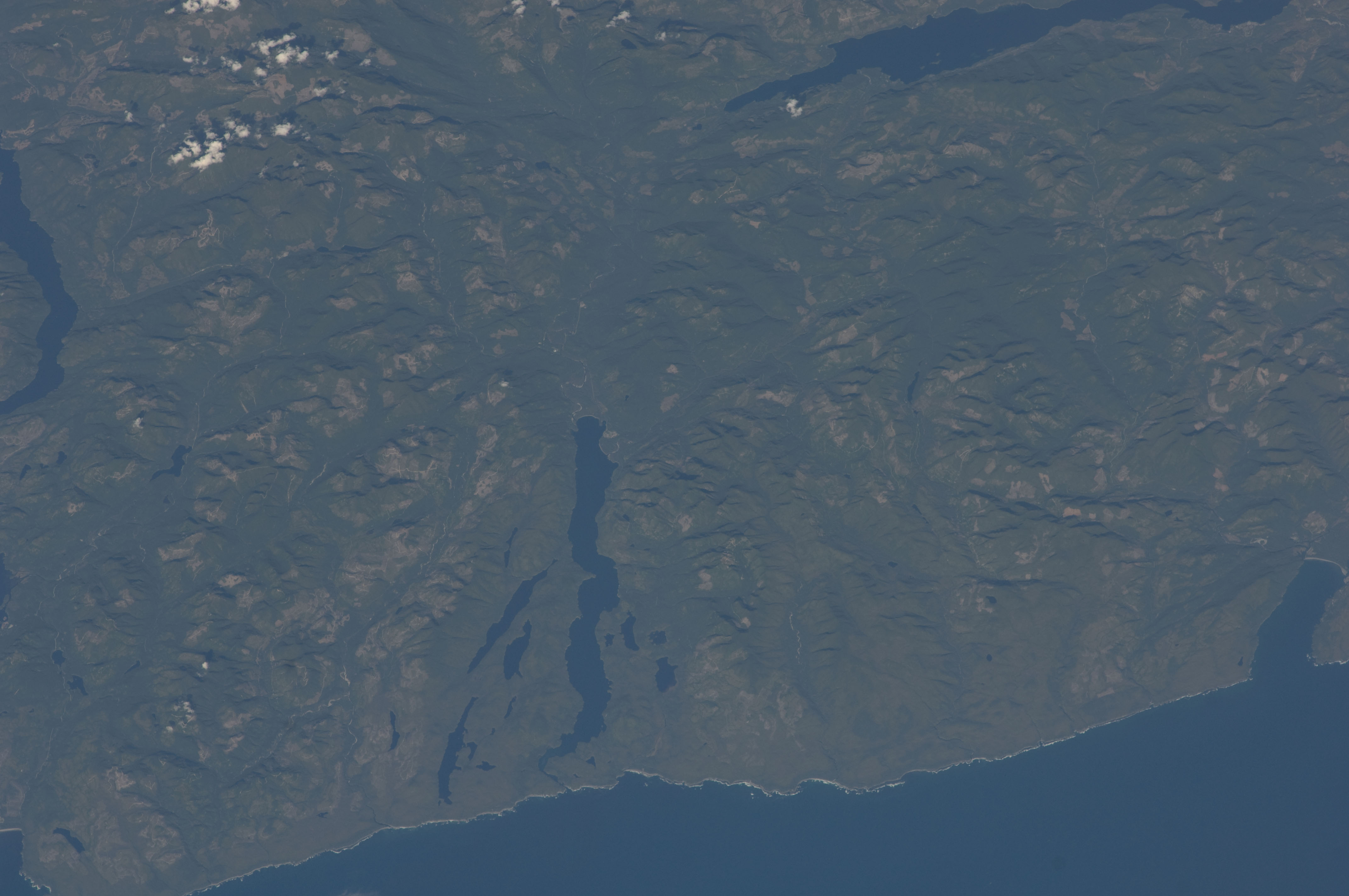
- Nitinat Lake and surroundings viewed by the International Space Station in 2009
- Location: Vancouver Island, British Columbia, Canada
- Coordinates: 48°45′00″N 124°45′00″W
- Type: lake and inlet
- Primary inflows: Nitinat River
- River sources: Vancouver Island Ranges
- Primary outflows: Nitinat Narrows

Nitinat Lake is a large lake and inlet on the southwestern coast of Vancouver Island, British Columbia, Canada. The lake is about 150 km (93 mi) northwest by road from Victoria, BC's capital on the southern tip of Vancouver Island, and about 60 km (37 mi) southwest by road from the town of Lake Cowichan. The city of Port Alberni is about 80 km (50 mi) by road to the north.

The southern end of the lake lies in Pacific Rim National Park Reserve, which also contains Nitinat Hill on the lake's northern shore and Nitinat Cone on the southern shore. Hitchie Creek Provincial Park and Nitinat Lake Ecological Reserve lie on opposite sides of the lakeshore about a third of the way from the lake's northern shore and the point where Nitinat River flows into the lake. On the lake's eastern shore lie Mt. Rosander and the foot of Carmanah Mountain, the eastern part of which is in Carmanah Walbran Provincial Park.

Nitinat Lake drains into the Pacific Ocean just north of the Pacific entrance to the Strait of Juan de Fuca via the Nitinat Narrows, a narrow tidal passage about 3 kilometres (1.9 mi) long. Tidal bores (ocean waves travelling up the lake) occur on the narrows, the heights of which depend on tide heights, and these can be dangerous. The small First Nations village of Whyac lies on the southern lakeshore beside Nitinat Narrows and just north of the First Nations village of Clo-oose, also on the coast.

The main volume of Nitinat Lake is salt water, with a thin layer of less dense fresh water floating on top.

== Recreation ==
Nitinat Lake has consistent thermal winds during summer that offer kiteboarding and windsurfing opportunities, attracting kiteboarders and windsurfers from around the world.

== See also ==
- List of lakes of British Columbia
