= Rendezvous Islands =

Island group in British Columbia, Canada

- Location of the Rendezvous Islands (centre right)

Geography
- Coordinates: 50°16′N 125°3′W
- Archipelago: Discovery Islands

Administration
- Canada
- Province: British Columbia
- Regional district: Strathcona

The Rendezvous Islands are a group of islands in British Columbia, Canada. They are part of the Discovery Islands between Vancouver Island and the mainland, between the Strait of Georgia and Johnstone Strait.

The Rendezvous Islands are located in Calm Channel, east of the north end of Read Island. Maurelle Island lies to the west, and Raza Island to the northeast. The Rendezvous Islands are located within Electoral Area C of the Strathcona Regional District. Sutil Channel and Cortes Island are located to the south.
