= Arbutus Grove Provincial Park =

Provincial park in British Columbia, Canada

Coordinates: 49°15′N 124°09′W

- IUCN category III (natural monument or feature)
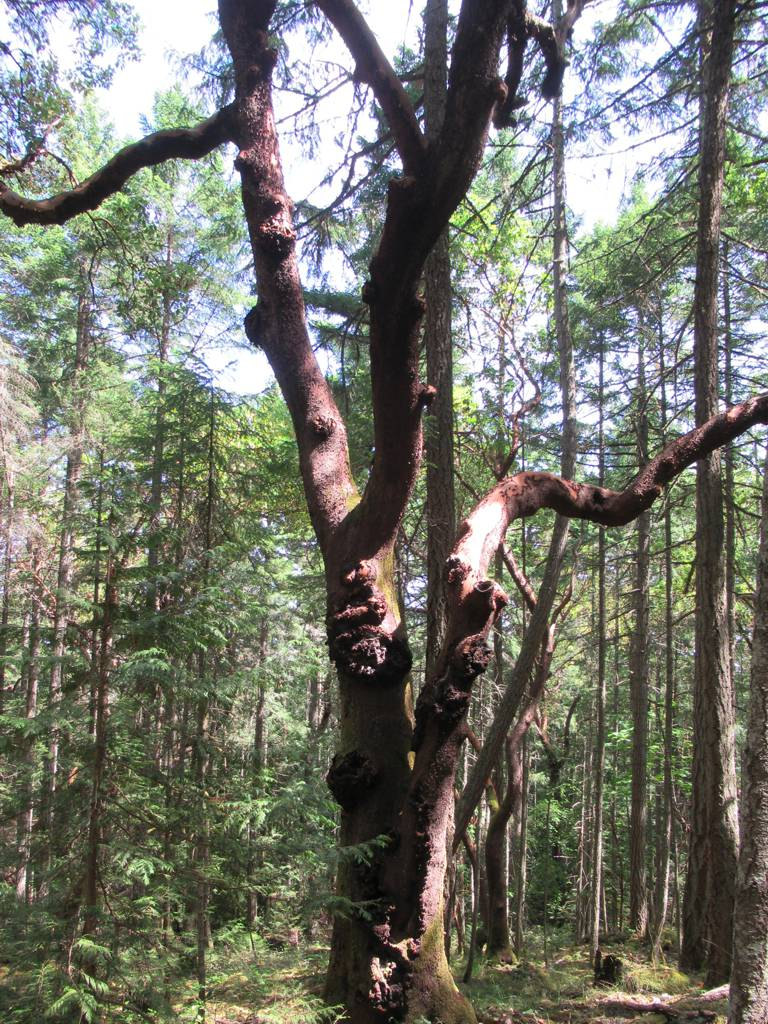
- An arbutus tree in the park
- Interactive map of Arbutus Grove Provincial Park
- Location: Nanaimo RD, British Columbia, Canada
- Area: 22 ha (54 acres)
- Established: 21 July 1966
- Governing body: BC Parks

Arbutus Grove Provincial Park is a 22 hectare provincial park located on Vancouver Island in British Columbia, Canada. It was established on 21 July 1966 to protect a representative strand of Arbutus tree.

The park is located within the larger Mount Arrowsmith Biosphere Region.

== See also ==
- Mount Arrowsmith Biosphere Region
