= Hitchie Creek Provincial Park =

Provincial park in British Columbia

- IUCN category II (national park)
- Location within British Columbia
- Interactive map of Hitchie Creek Provincial Park
- Location: Barclay Land District, British Columbia, Canada
- Nearest city: Ucluelet
- Coordinates: 48°47′44″N 124°44′25″W
- Area: 226 ha (560 acres)
- Established: July 13, 1995
- Governing body: BC Parks

Hitchie Creek Provincial Park is a provincial park in the Canadian province of British Columbia, west of the north end of Nitinat Lake on the west coast of Vancouver Island, north-east of Bamfield.

== See also ==
- List of protected areas of British Columbia
