= White Ridge Provincial Park =

Provincial park in British Columbia, Canada

- IUCN category III (natural monument or feature)
- Location within Vancouver Island Location within British Columbia
- Interactive map of White Ridge Provincial Park
- Location: British Columbia, Canada
- Nearest city: Gold River
- Coordinates: 49°46′42″N 125°58′25″W
- Area: 1,343 ha (3,320 acres)
- Established: 1995
- Governing body: BC Parks

White Ridge Provincial Park is a provincial park in British Columbia, Canada, and is located 4km east of Gold River on Vancouver Island.

== Geography ==
Adjoined to Strathcona Provincial Park, White Ridge forms the backdrop for the town of Gold River. It got its name from the white limestone and karst topography of the area.

== Recreation ==
Hiking and wilderness camping are permitted within park boundaries.

Caving - Vancouver Island is known for extensive cave networks, with more than 1000 caves documented since the 1970s. White Ridge Park is renowned for its extensive cave system, which contains some of Canada's deepest and longest caves. This primarily suitable for experienced cavers due to fast moving water hazards inside as well as some exposed climbs. Remains of wildlife, including bear bones, found within the cave have been shown to be over 9000 years old.

Certain areas of this park are open for hunting specific species. Hunters are required to have valid licenses and tags.
