= Small Inlet Marine Provincial Park =

Provincial park in British Columbia, Canada

- IUCN category II (national park)
- Location within Vancouver Island Location within British Columbia
- Interactive map of Small Inlet Marine Provincial Park
- Location: British Columbia, Canada
- Nearest city: Campbell River
- Coordinates: 50°15′07″N 125°17′20″W
- Area: 8.78 km^{2} (3.39 sq mi)
- Established: April 30, 1996
- Governing body: BC Parks

Small Inlet Marine Provincial Park is a provincial park in British Columbia, Canada on the northwest side of Quadra Island, near the city of Campbell River.

It is named after Squadron Leader Norville Small, a decorated officer who was referred to as a leader, tactician, and innovator.
