= Kin Beach Provincial Park =

Provincial park in Canada

- IUCN category II (national park)
- Location within British Columbia Location within Comox Valley Regional District
- Interactive map of Kin Beach Provincial Park
- Location: Comox Valley, British Columbia, Canada
- Coordinates: 49°43′43″N 124°53′54″W
- Area: 6 ha (15 acres)
- Designation: Class C Provincial Park
- Established: October 13, 1966
- Governing body: BC Parks

Kin Beach Provincial Park is a Class C provincial park in British Columbia, Canada, located just northwest of Kye Bay, to the north of Comox, British Columbia. As a Class "C" park, it is managed locally by a park board.
