= Boyle Point Provincial Park and Protected Area =

Provincial park in British Columbia, Canada

- IUCN category II (national park)
- Location within British Columbia Location within Comox Valley Regional District
- Interactive map of Boyle Point Provincial Park and Protected Area
- Location: Denman Island, British Columbia, Canada
- Coordinates: 49°28′49″N 124°41′59″W
- Area: 188 ha (460 acres)
- Established: August 10, 1989
- Governing body: BC Parks

Boyle Point Provincial Park and Protected Area is a provincial park in British Columbia, Canada, located on the south end of Denman Island in the western Gulf of Georgia.
