= Nuchatlitz Provincial Park =

Provincial park in British Columbia, Canada

- IUCN category II (national park)
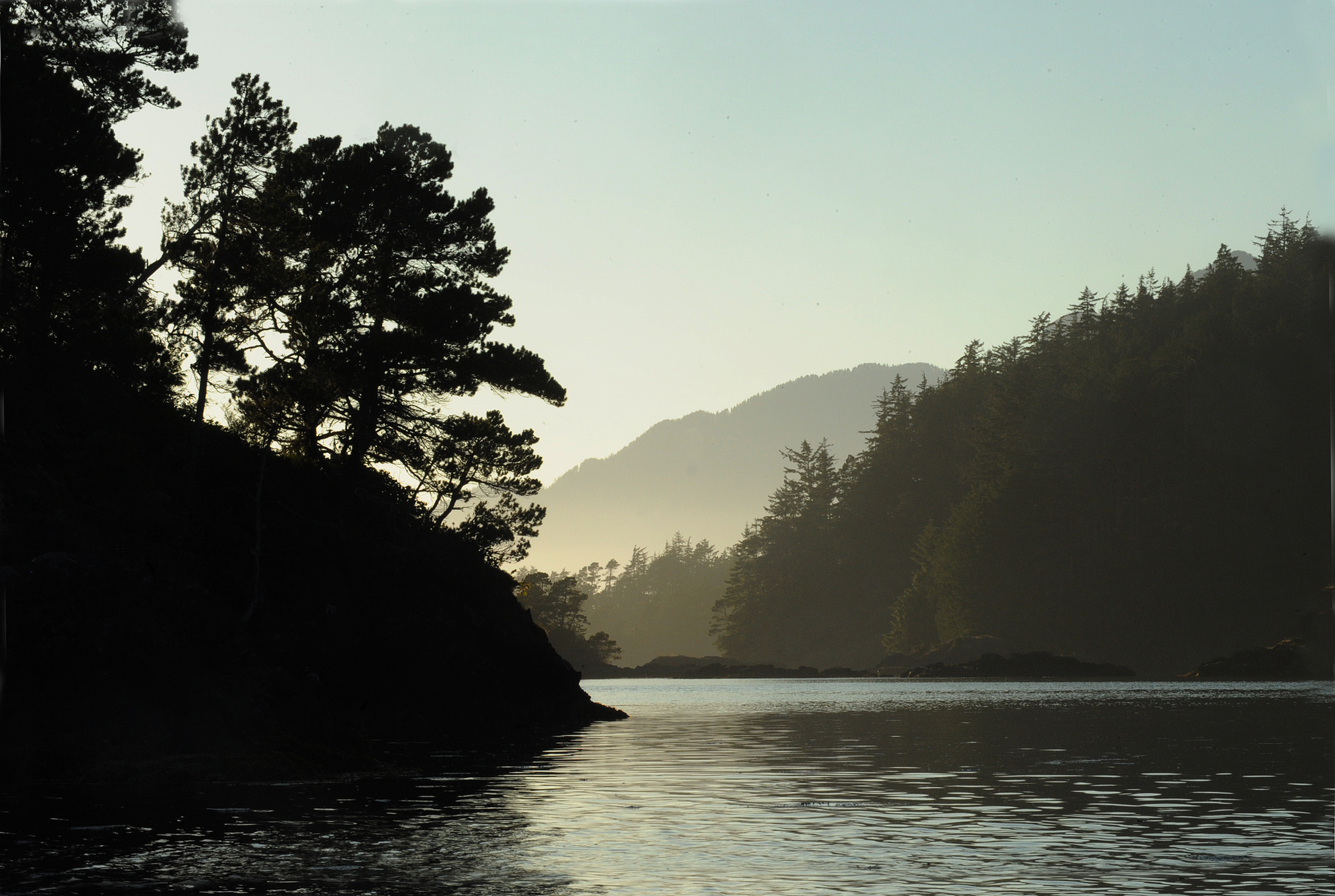
- Panoramic view

- Location within Vancouver Island Location within British Columbia
- Interactive map of Nuchatlitz Provincial Park
- Location: British Columbia, Canada
- Nearest city: Zeballos
- Coordinates: 49°48′46″N 126°58′10″W
- Area: 21.05 km^{2} (8.13 sq mi)
- Established: April 30, 1996
- Governing body: BC Parks

Nuchatlitz Provincial Park is a provincial park in British Columbia, Canada, located on the northwest side of Nootka Island, facing Nuchatlitz Inlet, on the west coast of Vancouver Island. Established in 1996, the park contains approximately 2105 ha.

== See also ==
- Nuchatlitz, British Columbia
