= Gold Muchalat Provincial Park =

Provincial park in British Columbia, Canada

- IUCN category II (national park)
- Location within Vancouver Island Location within British Columbia
- Interactive map of Gold Muchalat Provincial Park
- Location: Nootka Land District, British Columbia, Canada
- Nearest city: Gold River, BC
- Coordinates: 49°51′59″N 126°05′45″W
- Area: 645 ha (1,590 acres)
- Established: July 23, 1997
- Governing body: BC Parks

Gold Muchalat Provincial Park is a provincial park in British Columbia, Canada, located between the Gold and Muchalat Rivers.
