= Englishman River Falls Provincial Park =

Provincial park in Canada

- IUCN category II (national park)
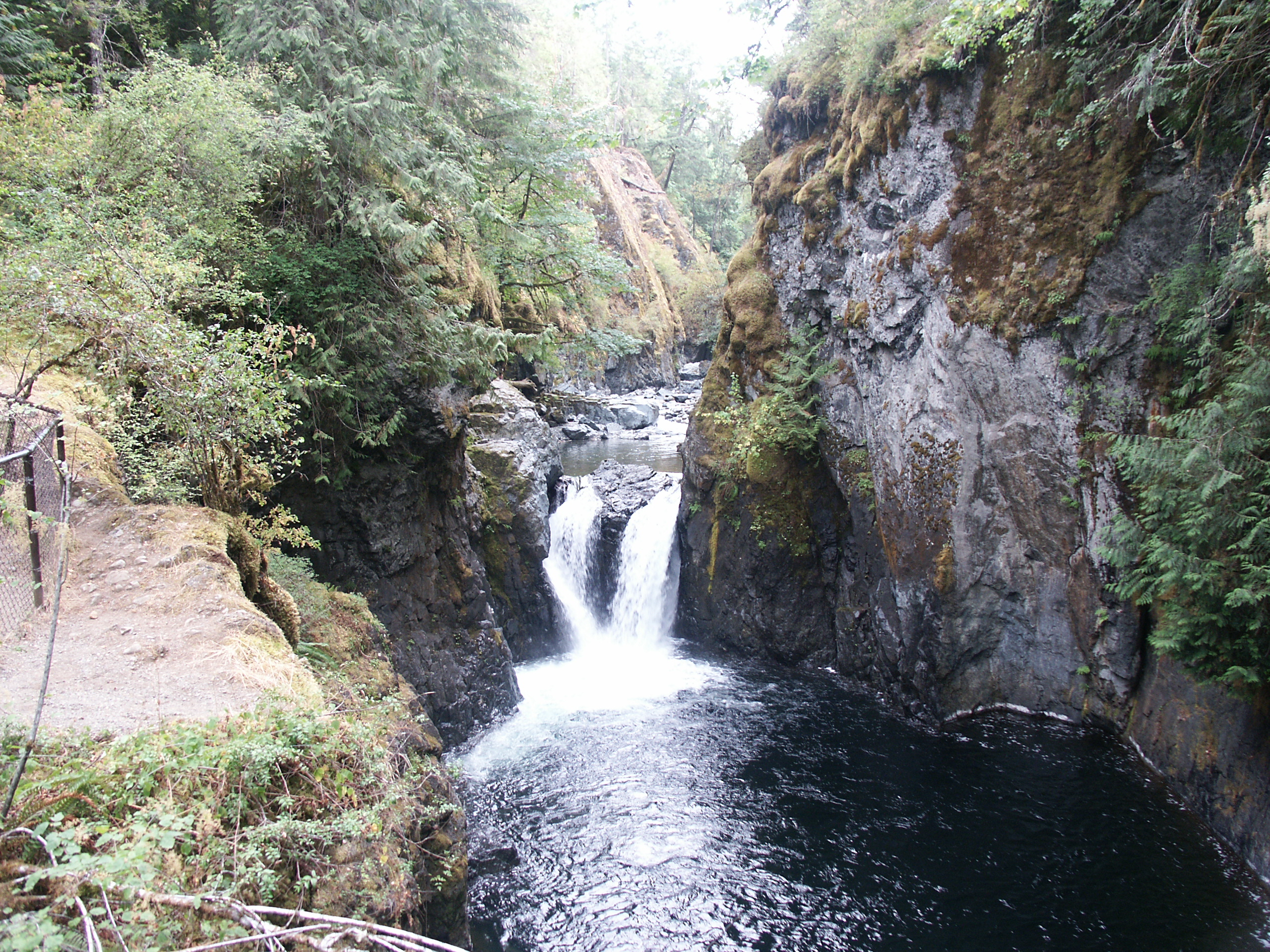
- Lower Englishman River Falls

- Location within Vancouver Island Location within British Columbia
- Interactive map of Englishman River Falls Provincial Park
- Location: Vancouver Island, British Columbia, Canada
- Nearest city: Errington
- Coordinates: 49°14′51″N 124°21′7″W
- Area: 97 ha (240 acres)
- Governing body: BC Parks
- Website: bcparks.ca/englishman-river-falls-park/

Englishman River Falls Provincial Park is a provincial park in British Columbia, Canada. It is located west of Parksville and borders the small community of Errington on Vancouver Island.

== Features ==
Upper Englishman River Falls

Short year round access hiking trails and bridges access both upper and lower falls on the Englishman River. In 2019 new trails were under development in partnership with a community group. The base of the falls is a popular swimming hole with 15 to 20 ft cliff jumping. Salmon spawning can be observed in season.

The campground has 107 sites, most of which are vehicle access and can be reserved during summer. There is a large day use area. The park covers 97 hectares and includes old-growth and second growth Douglas fir, cedar, hemlock and maple forest surroundings.

A First Nations legend mentions the skeleton of a white man found near the falls, hence its name.

== Nearby ==
The Englishman River Regional Park and a city part can be found nearby along the same river.

== See also ==
- List of British Columbia Provincial Parks
- Mount Arrowsmith Biosphere Region
