= Spectacle Lake Provincial Park =

Canadian provincial park in British Columbia

- IUCN category II (national park)
- Location within Vancouver Island Location within British Columbia Location within Cowichan Valley Regional District
- Interactive map of Spectacle Lake Provincial Park
- Location: Cowichan Valley RD, British Columbia, Canada
- Coordinates: 48°34′46″N 123°34′14″W
- Area: 67 ha (170 acres)
- Established: November 13, 1963
- Governing body: BC Parks; Cowichan Valley Regional District

Spectacle Lake Provincial Park is a provincial park in British Columbia, Canada, comprising 67 ha (170 acres) and located southeast of Shawnigan Lake on southern Vancouver Island.
