= Little Qualicum Falls Provincial Park =

Provincial park in British Columbia, Canada

- IUCN category II (national park)
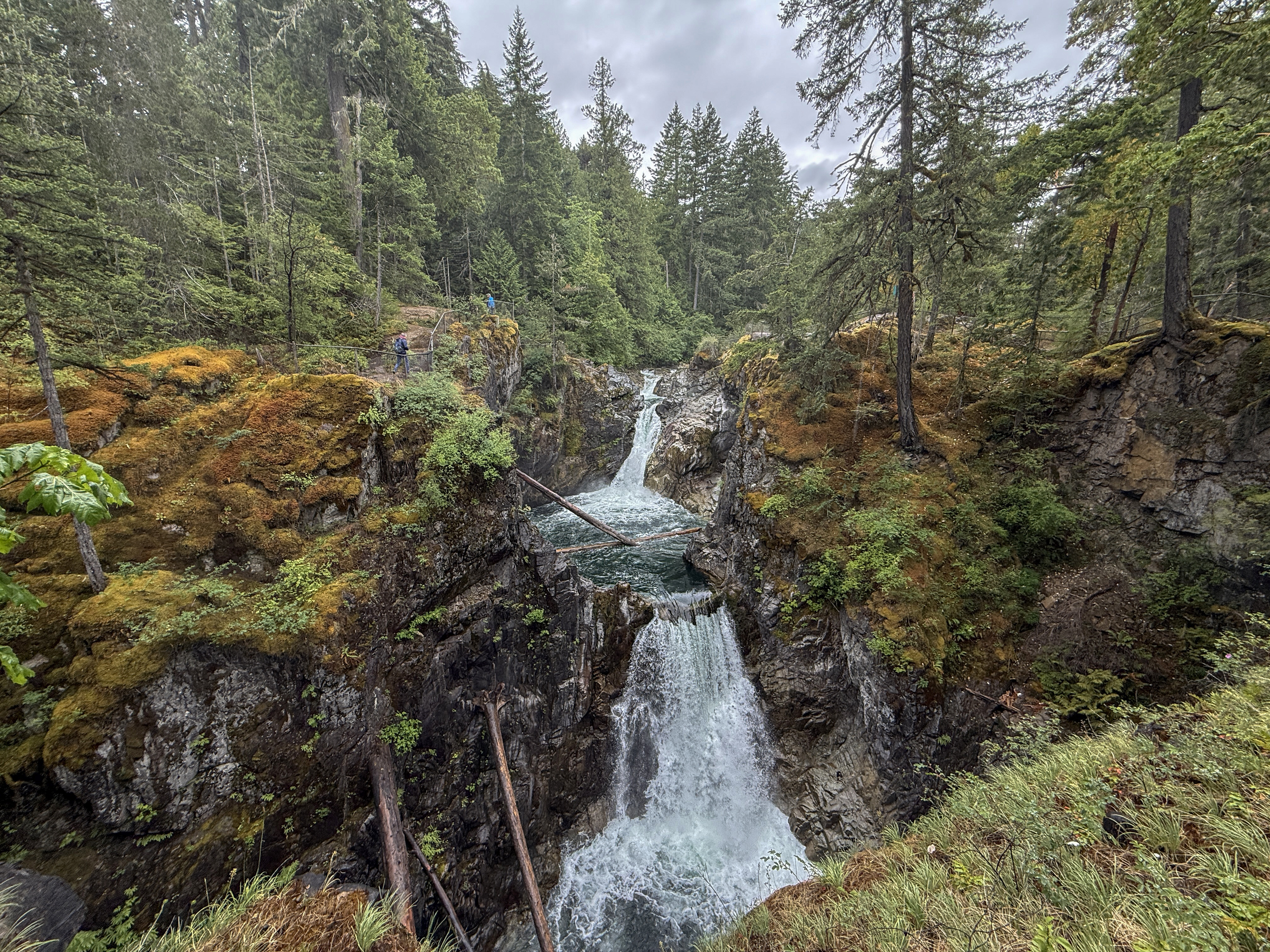
- Little Qualicum Falls

- Location within Vancouver Island
- Interactive map of Little Qualicum Falls Provincial Park
- Location: Nanaimo RD, British Columbia, Canada
- Nearest city: Parksville
- Coordinates: 49.285332°N 124.59913°W
- Area: 440 ha (1,100 acres)
- Established: 1940
- Governing body: BC Parks

Little Qualicum Falls Provincial Park is a provincial park in British Columbia, Canada, on central Vancouver Island, that encompasses the entire southern shore of Cameron Lake. The Island Rail Corridor line to Port Alberni passes through the park.

== History ==
Little Qualicum Falls Provincial Park was originally established as a park in 1940 to protect the old growth Douglas Fir forest.

== Activities ==
Swimming, fishing, campgrounds and day-use areas are available within the park, as well as sail boarding due to a wind funnel created by the surrounding mountains, Mount Wesley to the north and Mount Arrowsmith to the south. The park maintains 6 km of walking trails within its perimeter. 49.316667°N 124.55°W

== See also ==
- Mount Arrowsmith Biosphere Region
