= Dixie Cove Marine Provincial Park =

Provincial park in British Columbia, Canada

- IUCN category II (national park)
- Location within Vancouver Island Location within British Columbia
- Interactive map of Dixie Cove Marine Provincial Park
- Location: Rupert Land District, British Columbia, Canada
- Nearest city: Port McNeill, BC
- Coordinates: 50°03′04″N 127°11′55″W
- Area: 164 ha (410 acres)
- Established: April 30, 1996
- Governing body: BC Parks

Dixie Cove Marine Provincial Park, originally Dixie Cove Provincial Park, is a provincial park in British Columbia, Canada, located on the east side of Hohoae Island, which is just west of Fair Harbour in Kyuquot Sound on the West Coast of Vancouver Island.
