= Whaleboat Island Marine Provincial Park =

Provincial park in British Columbia, Canada

- IUCN category II (national park)
- Location within Vancouver Island Location within British Columbia Location within Cowichan Valley Regional District
- Interactive map of Whaleboat Island Marine Provincial Park
- Location: Vancouver Island, British Columbia, Canada
- Coordinates: 49°04′24″N 123°41′33″W
- Area: 10 ha (25 acres)
- Established: November 5, 1981
- Governing body: BC Parks

Whaleboat Island Marine Provincial Park is a provincial park in British Columbia, Canada, located just southeast of Ruxton Island, to the southeast of the city of Nanaimo.
