= Raza Island =

Island in British Columbia, Canada

- Location of Raza Island (centre right)

Geography
- Coordinates: 50°17′N 124°59′W
- Archipelago: Rendezvous Islands

Administration
- Canada
- Province: British Columbia
- Regional district: Strathcona

Raza Island is an island in British Columbia, Canada. It is part of the Rendezvous Islands in Calm Channel, which in turn are part of the Discovery Islands between Vancouver Island and the mainland, between the Strait of Georgia and Johnstone Strait.

Raza Island is located within Electoral Area C of the Strathcona Regional District.
