= Stamp River Provincial Park =

Provincial park on Vancouver Island in British Columbia, Canada

- IUCN category II (national park)
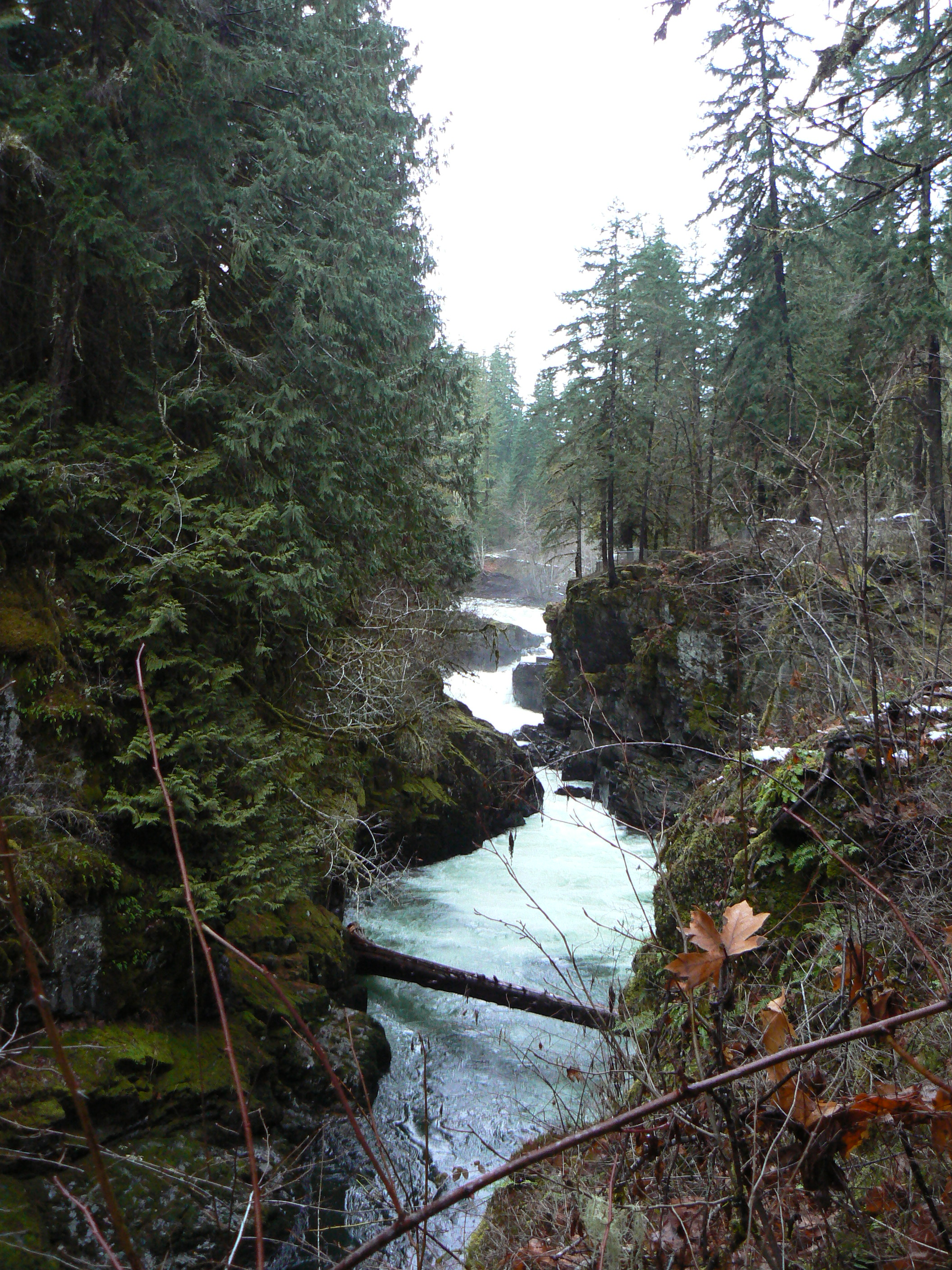
- Stamp River

- Location within British Columbia
- Interactive map of Stamp River Provincial Park
- Location: British Columbia, Canada
- Nearest city: Port Alberni
- Coordinates: 49°20′29″N 124°55′29″W
- Area: 3.27 km^{2} (1.26 sq mi)
- Established: July 23, 1997
- Governing body: BC Parks
- Website: bcparks.ca/stamp-river-park/

Stamp River Provincial Park is a provincial park in British Columbia, Canada. The 327-hectare park is located 14 km north of Port Alberni on Vancouver Island. There are 23 camping spaces and 2 km of trails within the park along the Stamp River, named for Edward Stamp, a sawmill pioneer in the Alberni Valley.

== Flora and fauna ==
The park features rapids and a waterfall as well as a substantial fish ladder constructed by Fisheries and Oceans Canada which allows half a million coho, sockeye and chinook salmon to pass upriver during the annual run from August to December. Spawning for these species takes place in the upper reaches of the river and in Great Central Lake. During the salmon run season, there is a greater prevalence of black bears in the area, attracted by the abundance of fish in the river.
