= White River Provincial Park =

Provincial park in British Columbia, Canada

- IUCN category III (natural monument or feature)
- Location within Vancouver Island Location within British Columbia
- Interactive map of White River Provincial Park
- Location: British Columbia, Canada
- Nearest city: Sayward
- Coordinates: 50°8′29″N 126°2′3″W
- Area: 68 ha (170 acres)
- Established: 1996
- Governing body: BC Parks

White River Provincial Park is a provincial park in British Columbia, Canada. It is located 27 km south of Sayward on Vancouver Island.

== Recreation ==
Fishing and hiking is available within park boundaries. A short loop-trail to the White River allows viewing of giant old-growth Douglas Fir and Western Red Cedar trees. This area has apparently been referred to as the Cathedral Grove of northern Vancouver Island. Kelsey Bay Division (MacMillan Bloedel Ltd) fallers refused to fall this area in 1990 and it was left. This did not happen very often.
