= Read Island =

Island in British Columbia, Canada

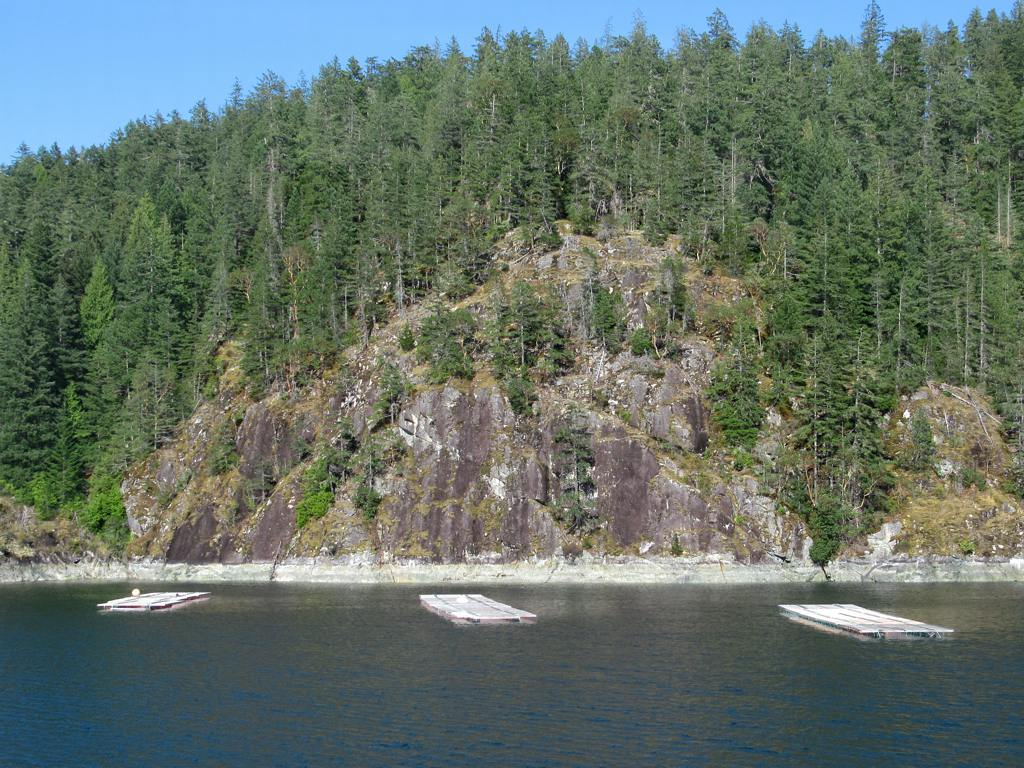
- Oyster farming at Read Island

- Location of Read Island (centre right)

Geography
- Coordinates: 50°11′00″N 125°05′00″W
- Archipelago: Discovery Islands

Administration
- Canada
- Province: British Columbia
- Regional district: Strathcona

Demographics
- Population: 80

Read Island is an island in British Columbia, Canada. It is part of the Discovery Islands between Vancouver Island and the mainland, between the Strait of Georgia and Johnstone Strait.

== Etymology ==
Read Island was named around 1864 by Daniel Pender, captain of the Beaver, for Captain William Viner Read, who was a naval assistant at the United Kingdom Hydrographic Office at the time. Viner Point, the southern point of the island, was named in association.

== Geography ==
Read Island is located between Quadra Island and Cortes Island, southeast of Maurelle Island and southwest of the Rendezvous Islands. Read Island is separated from Quadra Island by Hoskyn Channel, from Maurelle Island by Whiterock Channel, and from Cortes Island by Sutil Channel. Evans Bay forms a large inlet on the east side of Read Island.

== Demographics ==
Read Island has a population of approximately 80 residents and is located within Electoral Area C of the Strathcona Regional District. The locality of Read Island, British Columbia, which is a census-designated place, is located on the east side of the island, near its south end, at 50°11′00″N 125°05′00″W

== See also ==
- Read Island Provincial Park
