= Read Island Provincial Park =

Provincial park in British Columbia

- IUCN category II (national park)
- Location within Vancouver Island Location within British Columbia
- Interactive map of Read Island Provincial Park
- Location: British Columbia, Canada
- Nearest city: Heriot Bay
- Coordinates: 50°08′40″N 125°08′05″W
- Area: 6.37 km^{2} (2.46 sq mi)
- Established: April 30, 1996
- Governing body: BC Parks

Read Island Provincial Park is a provincial park in British Columbia, Canada. It is located on the south end of Read Island. Established in 1996, the park contains approximately 637 ha.
