= Maurelle Island =

Island in British Columbia, Canada

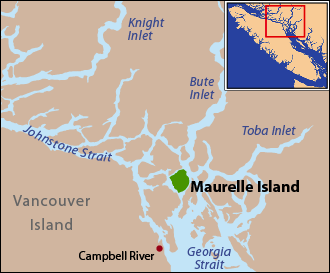
- Maurelle Island is located in the middle of the Discovery Islands

Geography
- Coordinates: 50°17′N 125°9′W
- Archipelago: Discovery Islands

Administration
- Canada
- Province: British Columbia
- Regional district: Strathcona

Maurelle Island is an island in British Columbia, Canada. It is part of the Discovery Islands between Vancouver Island and the mainland, between the Strait of Georgia and Johnstone Strait.

== Etymology ==
Maurelle Island was given its name in 1903 by the Geographical Names Board of Canada, in honor of the Spanish naval officer Francisco Antonio Mourelle de la Rúa.

== Geography ==
Maurelle Island is located northeast of Quadra Island, southeast of Sonora Island, and north of Read Island within Electoral Area C of the Strathcona Regional District. The island is separated from the mainland by Calm Channel, from Quadra Island by Okisollo Channel, from Read Island by Whiterock Passage, and from Sonora Island by a narrow strait called Hole in the Wall. The narrow passage between Quadra Island and Antonio Point, the southern tip of Maurelle Island, is known as Surge Narrows. Tidal currents in the narrows average 7.0 knots (3.6 m/s) at maximum flow.

Surge Narrows Provincial Park is located on the southern tip of Maurelle Island.
