= Coode Peninsula =

Peninsula in British Columbia, Canada

Coordinates: 50°01′03″N 124°43′51″W

The Coode Peninsula is a small peninsula on the inner side of the larger Malaspina Peninsula in the Sunshine Coast area of the South Coast of British Columbia, Canada, projecting into Malaspina Inlet just south of Okeover Inlet.

== Name origin ==
According to Captain Walbran, the peninsula was named after Captain Trevenen Penrose Coode of HMS Sutlej, the flagship of Rear Admiral Joseph Denman, who was commander of the Royal Navy's Pacific Station from 1864 to 1866. Another name attribution is from Sir John Coode, nephew of Vice-Admiral Charles Vinicombe Penrose and first lieutenant of HMS Plumper under Captain Pender.

== See also ==
- Coode
