= Malaspina =

Malaspina can refer to:

People

- The Italian noble Malaspina family. Members of this family include:
  - Albert Malaspina (1160/65 – 1206/12), Italian marquess.
  - Conrad Malaspina (The Old) (c. 1180 – after 1254), Italian nobleman.
  - Spinetta Malaspina, Italian nobleman.
  - Opizzo Malaspina (late 11th century – 1254 ), Italian nobleman.
  - Spinetta II Malaspina, Italian nobleman.
  - Conrad Malaspina (The Young), Italian nobleman
  - Ricciarda Malaspina (1497–1553), 16th-century Italian marchesa.
  - Taddea Malaspina (1505 – after 1537), 16th-century Italian marchesa.
  - Alessandro Malaspina (1754–1810), Spanish-Italian explorer.
- Michele Malaspina (1908–79), Italian actor and voice actor.

Places and objects, mostly named after Alessandro Malaspina

- Malaspina Glacier, Alaska.
- Malaspina Inlet, British Columbia.
- Malaspina Peninsula, British Columbia.
- Malaspina Strait, British Columbia.
- Malaspina Provincial Park, British Columbia.
- Mount Malaspina, Yukon, Canada.
- Vancouver Island University, British Columbia, was formerly Malaspina University-College, and before that was Malaspina College.
- M/V Malaspina, Alaskan ferry.
- Malaspina, Chubut, a settlement in the Chubut Province of Argentina.

== Other ==
- Malaspina (film), a 1947 Italian film directed by Armando Fizzarotti.
