= Lancelot (disambiguation) =

Lancelot was a knight of the mythical Round Table.

Lancelot or Launcelot may also refer to:

== People ==
=== Given name ===
- Lancelot Andrewes (1555–1626), English bishop and scholar
- Lancelot Addison (1632–1703), English clergyman and writer
- Lancelot Addison (Archdeacon of Dorset)
- Lancelot Baugh Allen (1774–1845), British educator
- Lancelot Barrington-Ward (1884–1953), British surgeon and rugby union player
- Lancelot Blackburne (1658–1743), Archbishop of York and alleged pirate
- Lancelot Blondeel (1498–1561), Flemish painter
- Lancelot Stephen Bosanquet (1903–1984), British mathematician
- Lancelot van Brederode (died 1573), Dutch military leader
- Lancelot Charles Lee Brenton (1807–1862), English Bible translator
- Lancelot "Capability" Brown (1716–1783), English landscape architect
- Lancelot Browne (c. 1545–1605), English physician
- Lancelot Bulkeley (1568?–1650), Welsh archbishop
- Lancelot de Carle (1508–1568), French scholar, poet and diplomat
- Lancelot Carnegie (1861–1933), British politician and diplomat
- Lancelot Clark (1936–2018), English shoemaker
- Lancelot Colson (1627 – c. 1687), English astrologer
- Lancelot Curran (1899–1984), Northern Ireland High Court judge and parliamentarian
- Lancelot Cutforth (1899–1980), British Army officer
- Lancelot de Mole (1880–1950), Australian engineer and inventor
- Lancelot Dent (died 1853), British opium dealer in China
- Lancelot Dowbiggin (1685–1759), English architect
- Lancelot Driffield (1880–1917), English cricketer
- Lancelot Elphinstone (1879–1965), Attorney General of Ceylon
- Lancelot Errington (1657–1745), English Jacobite mariner
- Lancelot Fish (1861–1924), Archdeacon of Bath
- Lancelot Gittens (born 1974), Guyanese athlete
- Launcelot Goody (1908–1992), Australian Roman Catholic bishop
- Lancelot Graham (1880–1958), British Indian civil servant
- Lancelot Grove (1905–1943), British cricketer and army officer
- Lancelot Hansen (1885–1928), Australian rugby league footballer
- Lancelot Hare (1851–1922), British civil servant, Lieutenant-governor of Bengal
- Lancelot Gerald Hasluck (1861–1937), English surveyor and philanthropist
- Lancelot Hemus (1881–1923), New Zealand cricketer
- Launcelot Henderson (born 1951), British Lord Justice of Appeal
- Lancelot Hickes (1884–1965), British Army officer
- Lancelot Hogben (1895–1975), British zoologist and statistician
- Lancelot Holland (1887–1941), British admiral who fought and died in the Battle of the Denmark Strait
- Lancelot Holland (British Army officer) (1781–1859), British Army officer and diarist
- Lancelot Oduwa Imasuen (born 1971), Nigerian filmmaker
- Lancelot Joynson-Hicks, 3rd Viscount Brentford (1902–1983), British politician
- Launcelot Kiggell (born 1954), British Army officer
- Lancelot Lake (1609–1680), English lawyer, landowner and politician
- Lancelot Layne (died 1990), Trinidadian musician
- Lancelot Lowther, 6th Earl of Lonsdale (1867–1953), English peer
- Lancelot Oliphant (1881–1965), British diplomat
- Launcelot Percival (1869–1941), Anglican priest and sportsman
- Lancelot Perowne (1902–1982), British Army officer
- Lancelot Phelps (1784–1866), American politician
- Lancelot Phelps (priest) (1853–1936), British clergyman and educator
- Lancelot Ribeiro (1933–2010), British Indian artist
- Lancelot Richardson (1895–1917), Australian flying ace
- Lancelot Richdale (1900–1983), New Zealand teacher and ornithologist
- Lancelot Ridley (died 1576), English theologian
- Lancelot Robinson (1905–1935), English cricketer
- Lancelot Rolleston (1785–1862), British politician
- Lancelot Royle (1898–1978), British sprinter and businessman
- Lancelot de Saint-Maard (died 1278), marshal of France
- Lancelot Salkeld (1475–1560), English clergyman
- Lancelot Sanderson (1863–1944), British politician and judge
- Lancelot Shadwell (1779–1850), English barrister and politician
- Lancelot Cayley Shadwell (1882–1963), English writer, lyricist, and ceramicist
- Lancelot II Schetz (died 1664), 2nd Count of Grobbendonk, Netherlandish nobleman and military commander
- Lancelot Slee (c. 1800–1878), English farmer and smuggler
- Lancelot Slocock (1886–1916), English rugby union player
- Lancelot Smith (c. 1885–1956), Australian rugby union player
- Lancelot Speed (1860–1931), British illustrator
- Lancelot Spicer (1893–1979), British politician
- Lancelot Spurr (1897–1965), Australian politician
- Lancelot Stirling (1849–1932), Australian politician and grazier
- Lancelot Threlkeld (1788–1859), English missionary in Australia
- Lancelot II of Ursel (1499–1573), mayor of Antwerp
- Lancelot Volders (1636–1723), Flemish painter
- Launcelot Ward (1875–1929), British Army officer
- Lancelot Ware (1915–2000), English barrister and biochemist
- Lancelot Law Whyte (1896–1972) was a Scottish philosopher, scientist and financier

=== Surname ===
- André Lancelot (born 1900), French rower
- Claude Lancelot, (c. 1615–1695), French monk and grammarian
- Jacques Lancelot (1920–2009), French clarinetist
- James Lancelot (born 1952), English organist and choir conductor
- Livia Lancelot (born 1988), French motocross racer

=== Fictional characters ===
- Lancelot Gobbo, a character in The Merchant of Venice
- Launcelot Langstaff, the pseudonymous author of the satirical periodical Salmagundi
- Lancelot Lakeknight, a character in the Battle Arena Toshinden fighting game series
- Lancelot Richmond, a character in Nexo Knights
- Lancelot, a hero in Mobile Legends: Bang Bang and its spin-off Mobile Legends: Adventure
- Lancelot, a codename for several Kingsman's agents including James Spencer and his successor Roxanne "Roxy" Morton

== Arts ==
- Lancelot-Grail, a volume of medieval French works that are a major source of Arthurian legend
- Lancelot, the Knight of the Cart, a 12th-century poem by Chretien de Troyes
- Lancelot (novel), a 1978 novel by Walker Percy
- Lancelot du Lac (film), a 1974 film directed by Robert Bresson
- "Lancelot" (Merlin), an episode of the 2008 BBC TV series
- Lancelot (video game), a 1988 text adventure game
- Lanzelot, 1969 opera by Paul Dessau

== Places ==
- Lancelot, South Australia, a ghost town
- Lancelot Inlet, an arm of Malaspina Inlet in the Desolation Sound area of the Coast of British Columbia, Canada

== Other uses ==
- Lancelet, a group of primitive chordates
- Launcelot (horse), a racehorse
- 2041 Lancelot, an asteroid
- Brasserie Lancelot, French brewery
- Lancelot Press, Canadian publishing company

== See also ==
- Sir Lancelot (disambiguation)
