= Toba Montrose General Partnership =

The Toba Montrose General Partnership (TMGP) is a 40/60 partnership between Alterra Power and GE Energy Financial Services that owns the Toba Montrose hydroelectric project, located near Powell River, British Columbia on the traditional lands of our First Nations partners: the Klahoose, Sliammon and Sechelt First Nations. The TMGP plants at East Toba River and Montrose Creek are British Columbia's largest run of river hydro plants. They have combined capacity of 196 MW and are expected to generate an average net annual energy of 710-730 GWh, which is contracted to B.C. Hydro under a 35-year EPA.
