= Theodosia Arm =

Locality in the South Coast of British Columbia, Canada

Coordinates: 50°04′00″N 124°42′00″W

Theodosia Arm is a locality in the Desolation Sound area of the South Coast region of British Columbia, Canada, located at the head of Thors Cove, an arm of Malaspina Inlet, near the outlet of Theodosia Inlet.

== See also ==
- List of settlements in British Columbia
- Theodosia (disambiguation)
