= Tahumming River =

Coordinates: 50°29′34″N 124°23′16″W

The Tahumming River is a river in the Pacific Ranges of the Coast Mountains in British Columbia, Canada, flowing southeast into Toba Inlet near that inlet's head.

On 12 May 2015, Alterra Power Corp. and the Klahoose First Nation announced that they will be building a 15 MW hydroelectric power plant on the Tahumming River the near the Toba Montrose and Jimmie Creek projects.

== See also ==
- List of rivers of British Columbia
