= Gifford Peninsula =

Peninsula in British Columbia

Coordinates: 50°03′47″N 124°45′17″W

The Gifford Peninsula is a peninsula on the east side of Desolation Sound in the Sunshine Coast region of the South Coast of British Columbia, Canada, located immediately north of the Malaspina Peninsula and separated from it by Malaspina Inlet. On its east side is Lancelot Inlet and its arm Theodosia Inlet
