= Desolation Sound Marine Provincial Park =

Provincial park in British Columbia, Canada

- IUCN category II (national park)
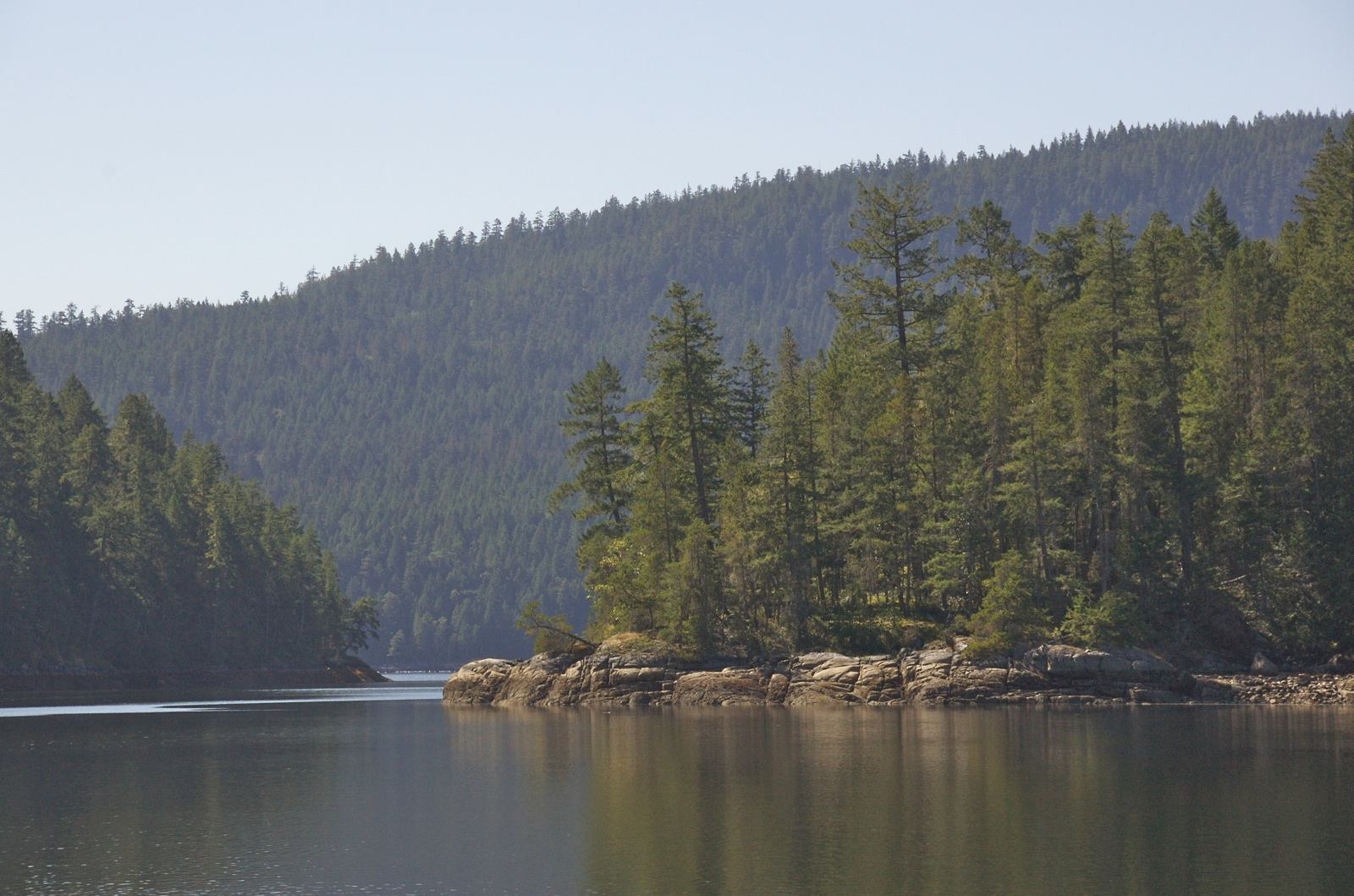
- Grace Harbour

- Location within Vancouver Island Location within British Columbia
- Interactive map of Desolation Sound Marine Provincial Park
- Location: British Columbia, Canada
- Nearest city: Powell River
- Coordinates: 50°06′08″N 124°42′00″W
- Area: 84 km^{2} (32 sq mi)
- Designation: Marine Provincial Park
- Established: 1973
- Governing body: BC Parks

Desolation Sound Marine Provincial Park is a provincial park in British Columbia, Canada located along Desolation Sound. The park is distinguished by its many picturesque sheltered coves and anchorages, frequented by yachts and pleasure craft. The scenery consists of waterfalls, rugged glaciated peaks, and steep forested slopes that fall into the ocean.

The park's many inlets, islets, coves, and bays attract many pleasure crafts each summer, when it is not uncommon for a hundred boats to share a small anchorage. The sound is home to a wide variety of wildlife and remains relatively free from development, although some areas, such as Theodosia Inlet, show signs of clear-cut logging.

The area has a long history of use by First Nations and it supports tremendous ecological diversity. From the time when Captain George Vancouver first visited the area to modern times, Indigenous people have been pressured off their land and have lost access to most of their hunting and gathering spots due to environmental protection, tourists, and pollution. Health authorities that are operated by First Nations groups are currently investigating the effects of environmental pollution in the area.

Land use in the marine area is now strictly controlled by the British Columbia provincial government, and any operations in this marine area that do not conform to the laws are eradicated.

== Location and size ==
The park is located approximately 32 km north of Powell River and 145 km north of Vancouver. Lund is the closest community. This provincial marine park, approximately 84 km^{2} in size, is only accessible by boat.

Desolation Sound Marine Provincial Park was created by the Government of British Columbia on May 18, 1973, under the advocacy of MLA Don Lockstead and the New Democratic Party government, out of an area comprising 8,449 hectares (32.6 mi^{2}) and over 60 km (37 mi) of shoreline. The park is located at the confluence of Malaspina Inlet and Homfray Channel.

== History ==
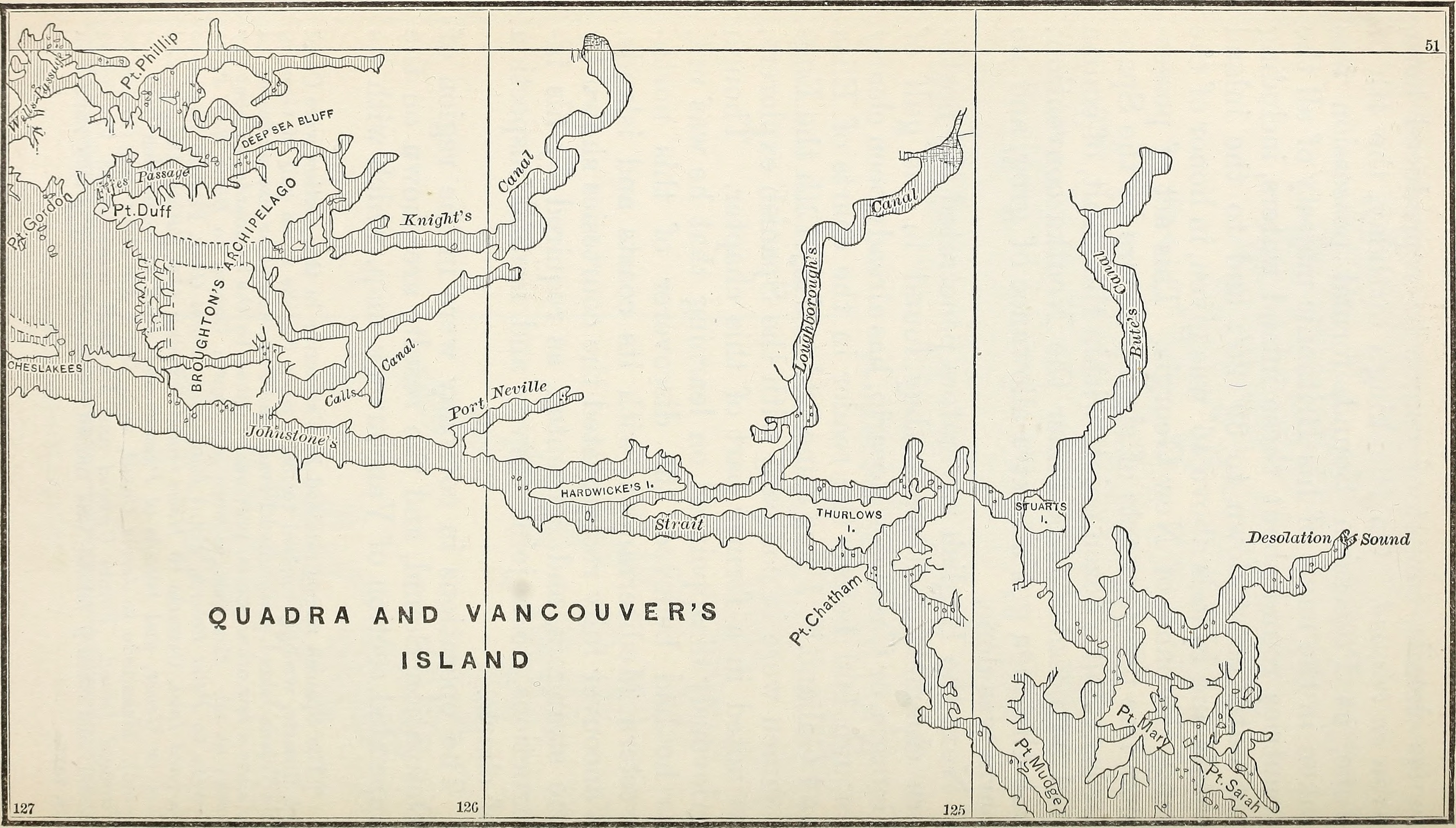
A map from 1884 published by Hubert Howe Bancroft showing Desolation Sound

Desolation Sound was first named by Captain George Vancouver. When he first sailed there, he encountered what he described as mostly abandoned Native settlements, gloomy weather, and barren land. It was, however, only temporarily empty due to a few factors. The first is that his visit likely came after a smallpox outbreak; second, it was the time of the year when most people would be inland hunting and gathering. Third, First Nations people were likely avoiding the Lekwiltok raiders. Another significant factor was that Vancouver's view was influenced by “European cultural aesthetics”, as he didn't recognize most indigenous-altered landscapes as occupied by people. While Vancouver saw Desolation Sound as an unattractive and empty land, people later came to value it as full of untouched nature.

The history of Desolation Sound Marine Park is intimately connected with the erasure of First Peoples’ presence from their ancestral lands. What non-indigenous people see as conservation efforts come in direct conflict with the lives of the Sliammon First Nations (Tla'amin Nation), who used to live, hunt, gather and practice their culture on these lands. Many also see Indigenous People's presence as ruining the pristine natural emptiness of the area. The Sliammon First Nations, however, provide an opposing narrative of unequal power relations and a homeland turned into a landscape for non-native visitors, taken over and destroyed by outsiders. Starting from 1875, they were, over time, pushed out of their communities into small reserves, and in 1920, legislation was enacted allowing the government to unilaterally reduce allocated reserve land.

== First Nations ==
As First Nations were pressured off their land, Desolation Sound reverted to a wild and uninhabited state, attracting those seeking a retreat from industrial society. While the Sliammon attempted to continue hunting, gathering, and participating in cultural activities, parts of the area were leased to non-indigenous residents as tourists and summer residents, increasing clashes of interest between them.

Summer houses were constructed in prime hunting and gathering locations and archeological sites, including graves, which were robbed as souvenirs. Environmental protection infringed on their ability to use what was left of the unoccupied land. While the area was under environmental protection, only some aspects of the park environment were protected. It is only more recently that people began to value the 10,000-year history of the area's Native occupants, who have built their lives around what Captain Vancouver called Desolation Sound. Increased tourism has harmed the First Nations and the environment. Untreated sewage and accidental fuel leaks from homes and boats have led to water pollution, dangerous for marine life and those relying on seafood as a primary food source. As a result, the Sliammon First Nations are afraid to eat the little traditional food available to gather after the government leased their best gathering spots to oyster farmers. The Sliammon have been harmed by the seemingly benevolent creation of parks, including the Desolation Sound Marine Park. Their identity is deeply integrated with the environment. While many still maintain the spiritual connection and use of land, it is increasingly complicated by the private property of settlers, tourism, pollution, and ecological protection areas.

=== Government relationship ===
Desolation Sound Provincial Park is an integral part of the traditional territory of the Sliammon and Klahoose First Nations. The areas within the park contain historical and spiritual sites that are culturally, economically, and socially important to these First Nations groups. According to the British Columbia government, Sliammon First Nations reviewed treaty negotiation documents and provided input to the planning process, reflected in various sections of the parks management plan. In 2008, both Desolation Sound First Nations groups (Sliammon and Klahoose) were involved in treaty negotiations with senior levels of government. First Nations can exercise aboriginal rights subject to conservation, public safety, and public health values. The final treaty may provide additional directions or changes on aboriginal rights within the park areas.

=== BC First Nations Environmental Contamination Program ===
First Nations Projects that investigate the connection between environmental pollutants and human health are supported by the First Nations Health Authority's Environmental Pollutants Program (EPP). Its goals are to encourage capacity building and assist First Nations communities in British Columbia in addressing their environmental health challenges. The Program integrates Indigenous methods of knowing, traditional knowledge, and empirical science to support community-based research on environmental health challenges.

== Ecology ==
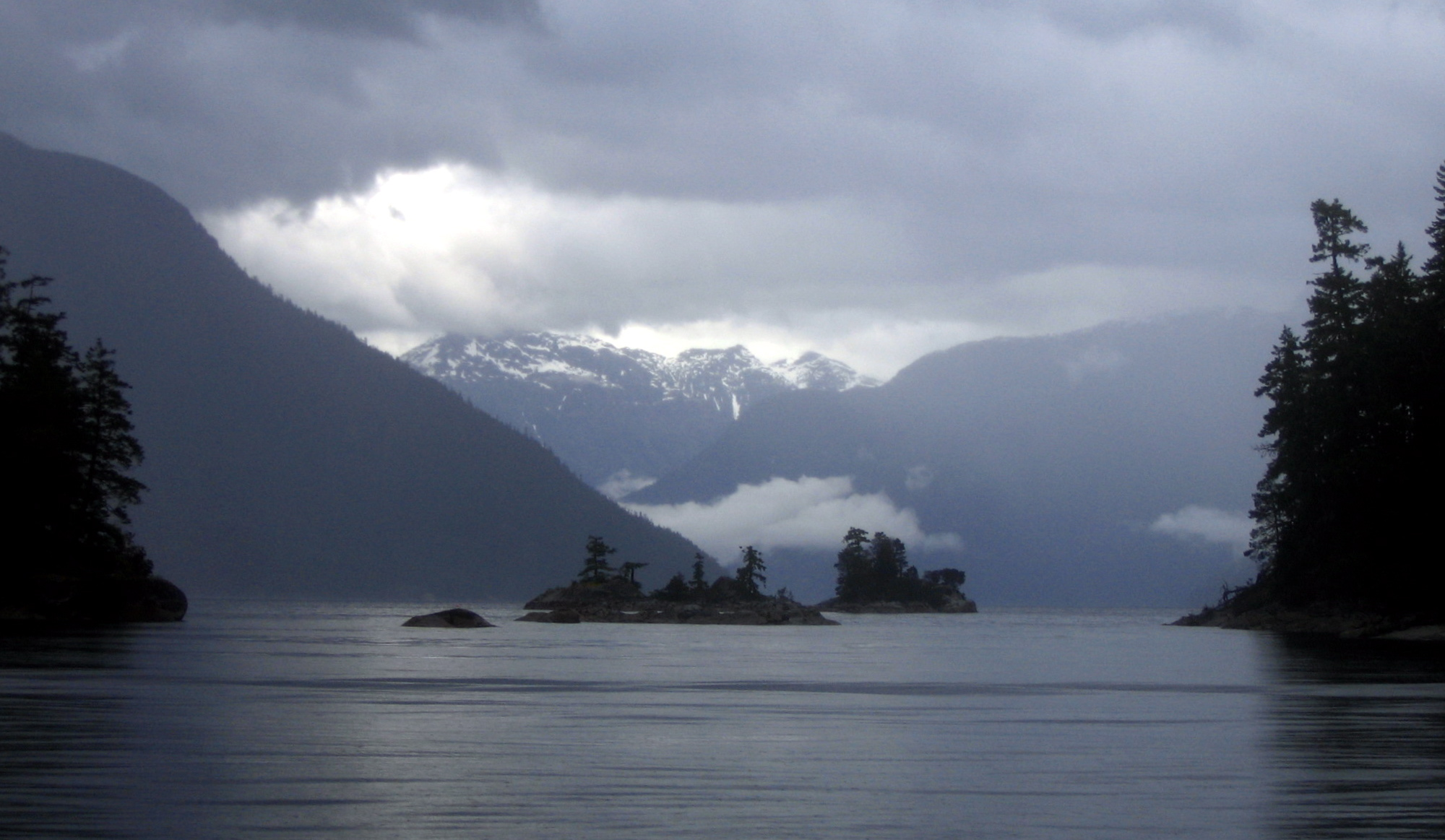
A view of Desolation Sound, 2006

=== Fauna ===
Desolation Sound Marine Park supports a diversity of terrestrial and marine species. Some terrestrial wildlife identified within the park includes large mammal species like black-tailed deer and black bears while small fur-bearing mammals and various species of reptile also inhabit the park. The park is also home to an abundance of marine animals including spawning and rearing areas for species of salmon and other fish like herring, while also supporting mammalian species such as porpoises and fin footed mammals like seals. The park also supports many migratory birds including several species of ducks and gulls; however, the presence of the marbled murrelet is particularly well documented because 10% of the Canadian Population and 1% of the global population of this bird species use the Marine Park in the summer and fall. The marbled murrelet is studied extensively because it has been listed as threatened by federal legislation since 1990, while agencies in British Columbia list it as a species of special concern. Other species at risk in the park include orcas, sea lions, eulachon, and heron.

=== Flora ===
Many coniferous tree species as well as deciduous maples and alders can be found within Desolation Sound Marine Park and The park primarily supports a second-growth regime thanks to previous logging efforts and wildfires, although sections of old growth areas remain within the park. Thanks to an abundance of favorable habitats, the park also supports many species of seagrass such as eelgrass, which play an important role in sequestering carbon dioxide. Salt marshes and kelp beds present in the park combine with the eelgrass to support a diversity of shellfish.

== Policy and management ==
The park is managed with 6 outcomes in mind.

=== A healthy and productive coast ===
A healthy local ecosystem is very important in the management of coastal marines as it is the basis of all the other functions that the coastal can provide. It provides a home to countless different species and benefits humans in many different ways. To keep a healthy and productive coast, the BC government focuses on recovering the wildlife and habitats as well as reducing marine pollution. Wildlife like salmon and killer whales are important parts of the local ecosystem.

=== Resilience to climate change ===
Climate change has a huge impact on the ocean ecosystem. Many species suffered from it and problems have occurred in many places like ocean acidification, sea level rising, and coral bleaching. The BC government believes it is important to keep the local communities safe first as they are the first line that responds to extreme weather events. Because climate change is also affecting seafood availability, a healthy and resilient community needs to be built to decrease the impact of climate change and the government should also collaborate with the First Nations to adapt to climate change. Compared to human-based solutions, nature-based solutions are more effective and long-lasting in dealing with climate change. People find them cost-effective and less likely to disrupt the local habitat.

=== Trusting, respectful relationships ===
The local communities are a significant part of managing the coastal areas. The First Nations have their unique way of understanding and managing coastal areas. The BC government believes it is crucial to respect the local community and collaborate deeply to get a comprehensive management strategy.

=== Community well-being ===
Local communities manage coastal areas and depend on them and the ocean for their well-being. They face challenges including climate change, pollution, and exclusion from decision-making processes. The provincial government has stated that it aims to create jobs and build local capacity to help these communities adapt to change.

Desolation Sound Marine Provincial Park is a typical example of managing recreational services. It is very popular among people as it offers kayak and boating activities, but the popularity is also affecting the local ecosystem. To better manage coastline development and access issues, the province aims to balance the need for recreational services and the protection of local habitats. The government also seeks to collaborate with the Indigenous People to manage the Park effectively and comprehensively.

=== A sustainable, thriving ocean economy ===
A sustainable economy not only focuses on GDP — It benefits the local community from many perspectives for a long time and it is good for people's future generations. The government is interested in different measures to build a sustainable economy, including investing in a diverse economy, promoting aquaculture and tourism, co-developing with Indigenous people, and managing cumulative effect.

== Controversies ==
In the journal article Desolate Viewscapes, author Jonathan Clapperton claims that BC Parks gauges the park's performance by adding amenities and more visitors. Some examples of this include placing campgrounds on environmentally sensitive land or letting hundreds of yachts anchor in a few tiny bays. Despite being a no-dumping zone, sewage released from yachts concentrated in small coves poisoned several of the marine park's waters, severely contaminating the local shellfish. Because they run the risk of becoming poisoned, many Sliammon First Nations people are reluctant to eat traditional foods in the water near the parks. For 10 millennia, the region served as a major source of food for Indigenous people due to the abundance of mussels, mollusks, and oysters that flourish in the warmest waters found in the north of Baja.

== See also ==
- Desolation Sound
- Prideaux Haven
