= Okeover =

Okeover is an English surname. It may refer to:

== People ==
- the Walker-Okeover baronets
- Okeover Longcroft (1850–1871), an English cricketer.

== Locations ==
- Okeover, Staffordshire, a civil parish in East Staffordshire, England.
- Okeover Hall, a country house in Staffordshire, England, that is the family seat of the Okeover family
- Okeover homestead, built by Alfred Richard Creyke, now owned by the University of Canterbury, New Zealand
- Okeover Inlet, formerly Okeover Arm, the upper end of Malaspina Inlet in the Sunshine Coast region of British Columbia, Canada
  - Okeover Arm Provincial Park, a provincial park of British Columbia, Canada, located on Okever Inlet
- Okeover Community Garden, a community garden at the University of Canterbury, New Zealand
