= Grace Harbour =

- q̓a qɛy q̓ay (Comox)
- Location within British Columbia
- Location: Sunshine Coast (British Columbia)
- Basin countries: Canada

Grace Harbour is a harbour and traditional village site of the Tla'amin peoples in the South Coast of British Columbia, located near Desolation Sound on the south side of the Gifford Peninsula opposite the Malaspina Peninsula to the southwest.

Along with the Gifford Peninsula, it is part of Desolation Sound Marine Provincial Park. Kahkaykay Indian Reserve No. 6 was located on the west side of the harbour but as of 2011 is now fee-simple land as a result of the Sliammon Treaty. at 50°02′58″N 124°45′21″W The headland at the southwest corner of the harbour is similarly named from the name of the ancient village at this site (see below), Kakaekae Point, at 50°02′32″N 124°45′56″W

== History ==
The native name of Grace Harbour in the language of the Tla'amin, Ayeahjuthum (Mainland Comox), is K'ák'ik'i, anglicized as Kah kee ky or Kahkeeky, "camp overnight", believed to come from k'iymtan, "camping place". The name refers to the waters of the harbour as well as a major village site on its shores where winter ceremonies were held encompassing all of the Tlo'hos (Klahoose) and Xwe'malhkwu (Homalco) and Tla'amin (Sliammon) groups, who were all one until broken into separate bands by colonization. An islet offshore from the village site was used as a speaking podium.

There are numerous archaeological sites and trade trails in the area, which is still used by Tla'amin for food-gathering and traditional medicines and is overlain with stories important to native culture. Native use of the site has been impaired because of the popularity of the area with tourists because of the provincial park.

== See also ==
- List of settlements in British Columbia
