= East Redonda Island =

Coastal island in British Columbia, Canada

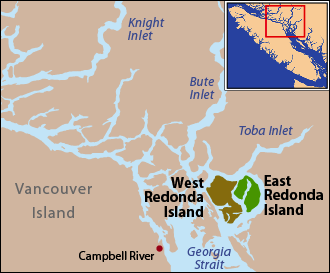
- East and West Redonda Islands are located just north of Desolation Sound, near the mouth of Toba Inlet.

Geography
- Location: Salish Sea
- Coordinates: 50°14′N 124°43′W
- Highest elevation: 1,591 m (5220 ft)
- Highest point: Mount Addenbroke

Administration
- Canada
- Province: British Columbia
- Regional district: Strathcona

East Redonda Island is a coastal island in British Columbia, Canada, part of the Discovery Islands archipelago. It lies just to the north of Desolation Sound Marine Park, which is located off the north end of the Malaspina Peninsula at the mouth of Toba Inlet within Electoral Area C of the Strathcona Regional District.

== History ==
Both Redonda Islands were sighted in 1792 by the Spanish explorers Galiano and Valdés and given the name Isla Redonda, meaning "round".

== Geography ==
East Redonda Island is separated from the larger West Redonda Island by Waddington Channel. The eastern side of the island is separated from the mainland by the deep Homfray Channel. Deeply incising this island from Waddington Channel is Pendrell Sound, which runs toward the northeast. At the northern end of the island is Pryce Channel.

The island's shape is similar to that of Orcas Island of the San Juan Islands in Washington.

The highest point on East Redonda Island is Mount Addenbroke at 1,591 metres (5,220 feet). (50° 14' N; 124° 41' W)

== Conservation ==
The eastern half of the island is home to the "East Redonda Island Ecological Reserve", a preserve established for forestry research and forest growth. It is 6,212 ha (15,350 acres).
