= Coode =

Coode is a surname. Notable persons with the surname include:

- Arthur Coode (1876–1940), English cricketer
- Ed Coode (born 1975), British rower
- Jim Coode (1951–1987), Canadian football player
- John Coode (Governor of Maryland) (c. 1648–1709), English rebellion leader and politician
- John Coode (engineer) (1816–1892), English civil engineer
- Mark James Elgar Coode (born 1937), British botanist

== See also ==
- Coode Canal, Australia
- Coode Island, Australia
- Coode Peninsula, British Columbia, Canada
- Coode Street jetty, Western Australia
