= Mount Addenbroke =

Mountain in British Columbia, Canada

- Location within British Columbia
- Location in East Redonda Island Ecological Reserve

Highest point
- Elevation: 1,591 m (5,220 ft)
- Prominence: 1,591 m (5,220 ft)
- Parent peak: Mount Crawshay (1646 m)
- Listing: Mountains of British Columbia
- Coordinates: 50°13′54″N 124°41′8″W

Geography
- Location: East Redonda Island, British Columbia, Canada
- District: New Westminster Land District
- Parent range: Pacific Ranges
- Topo map: NTS 92K2 Desolation Sound

Mount Addenbroke is a mountain on East Redonda Island, British Columbia, Canada, located 11 km (7 mi) northwest of Mount Crawshay and 6 km (4 mi) southeast of Mount Bunsen.
