= Copeland Islands Marine Provincial Park =

Provincial park in British Columbia, Canada

- IUCN category II (national park)
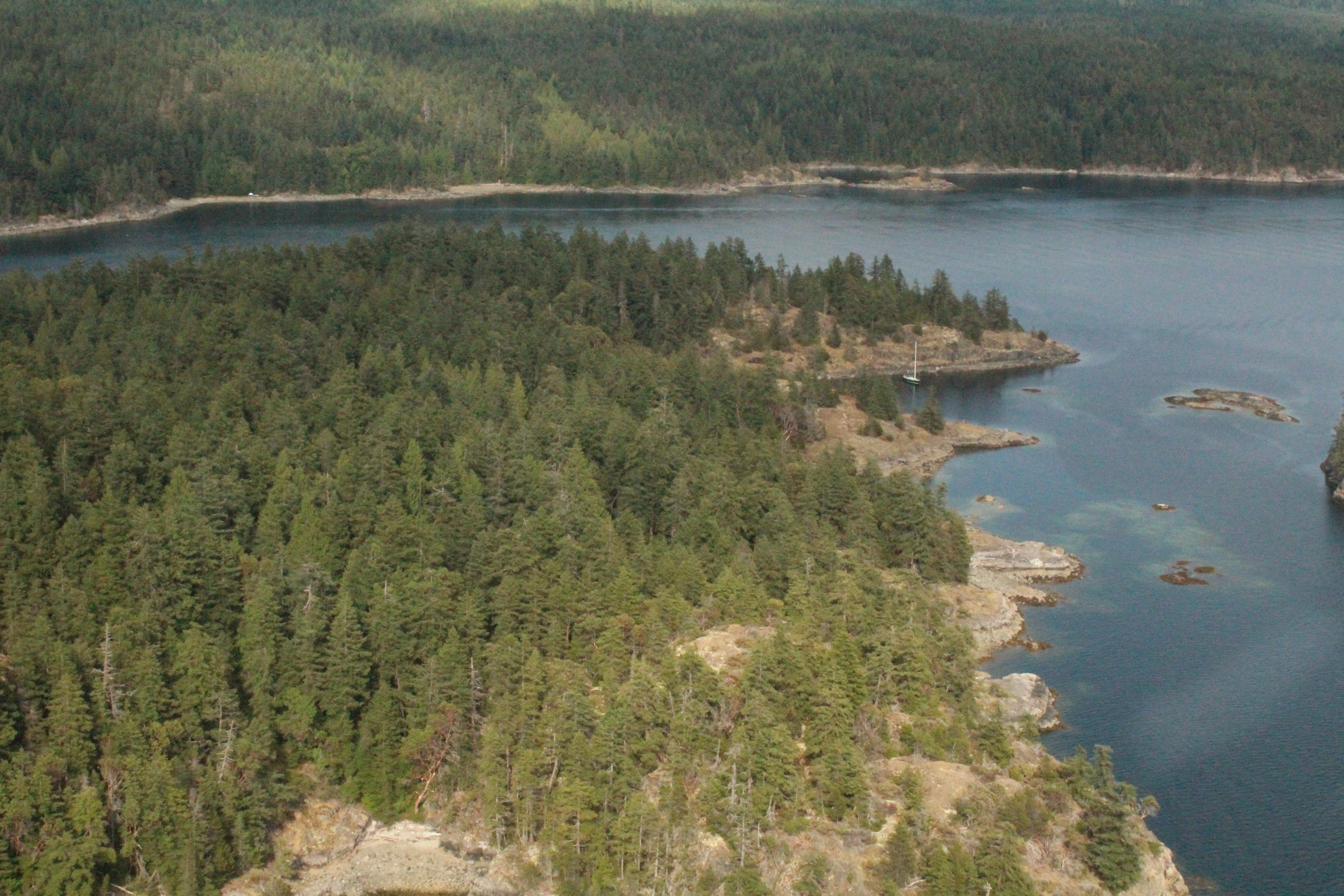
- Copeland Islands seen from a floatplane

- Location within Vancouver Island Location within British Columbia
- Interactive map of Copeland Islands Marine Provincial Park
- Location: New Westminster Land District, British Columbia, Canada
- Nearest city: Campbell River, BC
- Coordinates: 50°00′33″N 124°48′53″W
- Area: 423 ha (1,050 acres)
- Established: July 29, 1971
- Governing body: BC Parks

Copeland Islands Marine Provincial Park is a provincial park in British Columbia, Canada, located in Desolation Sound to the northwest of Lund on the northern Sunshine Coast off the west coast of the Malaspina Peninsula.

The park was established in 1971, comprising approximately 423 hectares (1,050 acres), with 153 hectares of upland and 278 hectares of foreshore.
