= Lancelot Inlet =

Inlet in British Columbia

Coordinates: 50°03′42″N 124°42′58″W

Lancelot Inlet is an inlet in the Sunshine Coast region of the South Coast of British Columbia, Canada. It is a sidewater of Malaspina Inlet, and immediately east of the Gifford Peninsula. Via Thors Cove on its east side, its own sidewater is Theodosia Inlet, at the head of which is the mouth of the Theodosia River. The locality of Theodosia Arm is located here.

== See also ==
- Lancelot (disambiguation)
