= Malaspina Inlet =

Inlet in British Columbia

Coordinates: 50°02′42″N 124°46′19″W

- Interactive map of Malaspina Inlet
- Location: Sunshine Coast, British Columbia

Malaspina Inlet is an inlet on the east side of Desolation Sound in the South Coast region of British Columbia, Canada, located between Malaspina and Gifford Peninsulas. It measures around half a mile wide and stretches around 8 miles, from the mainland to Jervis Inlet, parallel to the Strait of Georgia. Sidewaters include Thors Cove and, via it, Theodosia Inlet, where Theodosia Arm is located. The upper, southeastern, end of Malaspina Inlet near the City of Powell River is called Okeover Inlet, the east side of which sits steamer landing Larsons Landing. Grace Harbour is located on north side of Malaspina Inlet on the southwest side of Gifford Peninsula.

== See also ==
- Malaspina (disambiguation)
