= Theodosia River =

Coordinates: 50°04′49″N 124°39′17″W

The Theodosia River is a river in the Pacific Ranges of the South Coast region of British Columbia, Canada, flowing southwest into Theodosia Inlet in the Desolation Sound region.

== See also ==
- List of rivers of British Columbia
- Theodosia (disambiguation)
