= Malaspina Provincial Park =

Provincial park in British Columbia

- IUCN category II (national park)
- Location within Vancouver Island Location within British Columbia
- Interactive map of Malaspina Provincial Park
- Location: British Columbia, Canada
- Nearest city: Campbell River
- Coordinates: 50°02′24″N 124°46′29″W
- Area: 5.72 km^{2} (2.21 sq mi)
- Established: April 11, 2001
- Governing body: BC Parks

Malaspina Provincial Park is a provincial park in British Columbia, Canada, located on the northeast side of the Malaspina Peninsula facing Desolation Sound in the northernmost area of that province's Sunshine Coast region.
