= Sir Lancelot (disambiguation) =

Sir Lancelot was a knight of the Round Table.

Sir Lancelot may also refer to:

- The Adventures of Sir Lancelot, a British television series that was also shown in the United States
- Sir Lancelot (singer) (1902–2001), calypso singer and actor
- RFA Sir Lancelot (L3029), a Round Table class landing ship
- Sir Lancelot (video game), a 1984 computer game published by Melbourne House for the Amstrad CPC and ZX Spectrum
- Sir Lancelot (clipper), a clipper ship built in 1865

== See also ==
- Lancelot (disambiguation)
