= Theodosia rodorigezi =

Scientific classification
- Kingdom: Animalia
- Phylum: Arthropoda
- Class: Insecta
- Order: Coleoptera
- Suborder: Polyphaga
- Infraorder: Scarabaeiformia
- Family: Scarabaeidae
- Genus: Theodosia
- Species: T. rodorigezi

Binomial name
- Theodosia rodorigezi Nagai, 1980

Species of beetle

Theodosia rodorigezi is a scarab beetle in the subfamily Cetoniinae found in the island of Palawan, Philippines. The male is a beautiful iridescent green.

The name is dedicated to the local guide, Mr. Rowell Rodriguez who had helped the entomologists in their expedition in the island of Palawan.

It is first listed by SAKAI & NAGAI 1998 The Cetoniine Beetles of the World.
