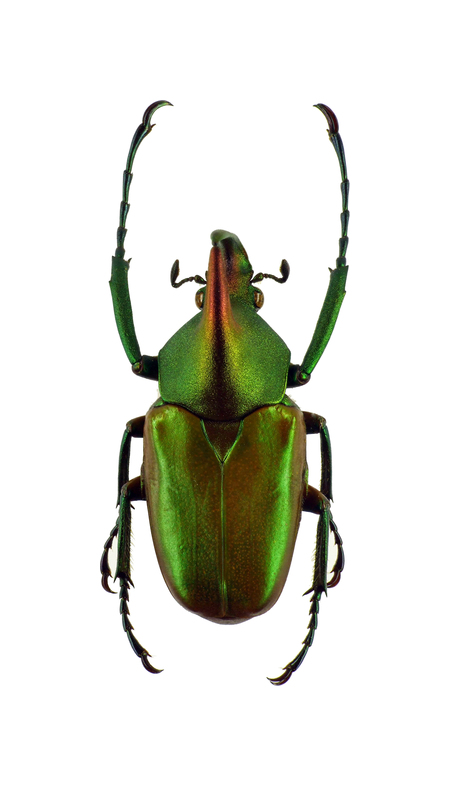

Scientific classification
- Kingdom: Animalia
- Phylum: Arthropoda
- Class: Insecta
- Order: Coleoptera
- Suborder: Polyphaga
- Infraorder: Scarabaeiformia
- Family: Scarabaeidae
- Genus: Theodosia
- Species: T. nobuyukii

Binomial name
- Theodosia nobuyukii Nagai, 1998

= Theodosia nobuyukii =

Species of beetle

Theodosia nobuyukii is a species of scarab beetle native to the rainforests of Kalimantan, Indonesia.

== Description ==
T. nobuyukii is similar in appearance to the Hercules beetle, with the males sporting large horns on its head. Its body is vibrantly colored.
