= Albert Ostman =

Canadian gold prospector (c. 1893–1975)

- Born: April 21, 1893; Arnäsvall, Sweden
- Died: January 16, 1975 (aged 81); Fort Langley, British Columbia, Canada
- Occupation: Prospector
- Known for: Alleged abduction by sasquatch in 1924

Albert Ostman (April 21, 1893 – January 16, 1975) was a Swedish-born Canadian prospector. In 1957 he reported that he had been abducted by a sasquatch and held captive for six days, stating that these events had taken place near Toba Inlet, British Columbia in 1924.

== Early life ==
Ostman was born in Arnäsvall, Sweden, on April 21, 1893 to Abraham and Albertina Östman (nee Strandberg). He emigrated from Sweden to Canada in 1913.

== Sasquatch incident ==
In 1924, Ostman alleged that he traveled to Toba Inlet, British Columbia for a vacation and prospecting trip. Ostman had heard stories about "man beasts" who supposedly roamed these woods, but refused to believe them. As he lay asleep one evening, a sasquatch purportedly picked him up and carried him off while he was in his sleeping bag. Ostman was carried in his sleeping bag across country for three hours by the Sasquatch. The Sasquatch dropped Ostman down on a plateau. Standing around him was a family of four of the creatures. Ostman was subsequently held captive by the sasquatch and its family. The captors were two adults and two children, one male and one female. One of the creatures was reported as being eight feet tall. Ostman did not use his gun on them as they had done him no harm. He stayed with the family for six days.

Ostman claimed he escaped by feeding snuff to the adult male sasquatch, which made him groggy and disoriented. Ostman came forward with these events in 1957. He claimed he did not tell his story for more than 24 years after it happened for fear of being thought of as crazy. He first told his story to a local newspaper, The Province, in 1957.

== Death and legacy ==
Ostman died in Fort Langley, British Columbia in 1975 at the age of 81. He has achieved notoriety in the cryptozoological community, with his story being well-known among Bigfoot researchers. In 2007, the skeptic Joe Nickell characterized the story as "more likely the result of imagination than of recollection". Critics of Ostman note that he did not make the event public until 1957, thirty-three years after he said it took place. Primatologist John Napier states that "Ostman's story fails to convince me primarily on the grounds of the limited food resources available." Bigfoot researcher Peter Byrne cannot accept Ostman's story without more evidence.
