= Larsons Landing =

Coordinates: 49°59′00″N 124°41′00″W

Larsons Landing is a steamer landing on the northwest shore of Okeover Inlet, which is the upper end of Malaspina Inlet in the Sunshine Coast region of British Columbia, Canada.
