= Toba River (British Columbia) =

River in Canada

- Mouth of Toba River

Location
- Country: Canada
- Province: British Columbia
- District: Range 1 Coast Land District

Physical characteristics
- Source: Toba Glacier
  - location: Coast Mountains
- Mouth: Toba Inlet
  - location: Sunshine Coast
  - coordinates: 50°29′17″N 124°21′57″W
  - elevation: 0 m (0 ft)
- Basin size: 1,759 km^{2} (679 sq mi)

The Toba River is a river in the Canadian province of British Columbia. Also referred to as the East Toba river. Its drainage basin is 1,759 square kilometres (679 sq mi) in size.

== Course ==
The Toba River originates in the Coast Mountains and flows generally southwest from Toba Glacier to the head of Toba Inlet.

== Toba Montrose ==
In 2004 development of a 235 MW run of river energy project began on East Toba River. The $660 million project is funded and operated through a private loan from a partnership of lenders led by Manulife Financial Canada. Plutonic Power Corporation and GE Energy also referred to as the Toba Montrose General Partnership are the main stakeholders in the project . Construction is overseen by the Kiewit Corporation in partnership with the Sliammon and K'ómoks First Nation Territory Agreement. On 7 March 2011, it was announced that Magma Energy and Plutonic Power will merge to create Alterra Power Corp. The Toba Montrose Project was in operation in August 2010.

== See also ==
- List of rivers of British Columbia
