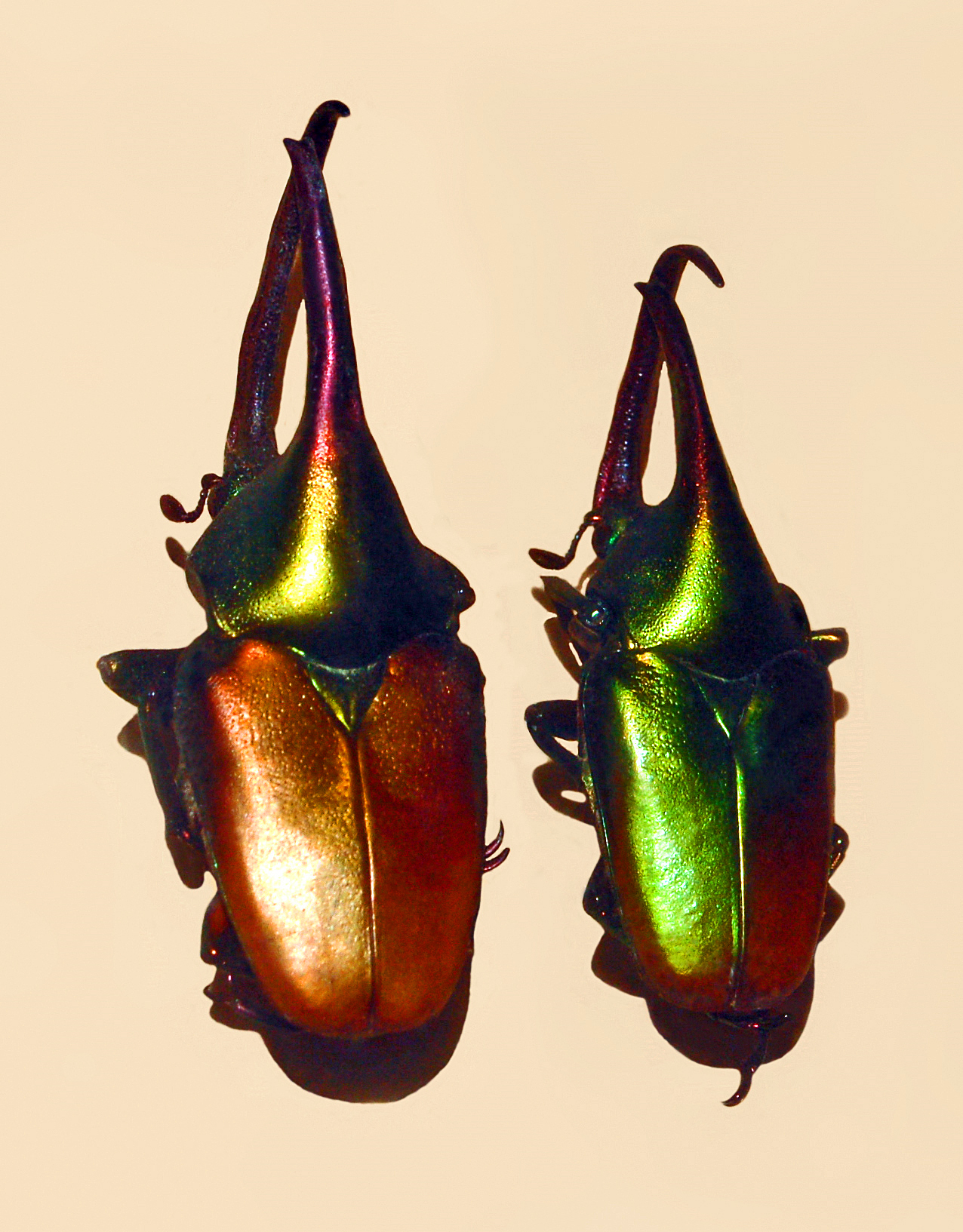
- Theodosia viridiaurata from Borneo. Male

Scientific classification
- Kingdom: Animalia
- Phylum: Arthropoda
- Class: Insecta
- Order: Coleoptera
- Suborder: Polyphaga
- Infraorder: Scarabaeiformia
- Family: Scarabaeidae
- Genus: Theodosia
- Species: T. viridiaurata

Binomial name
- Theodosia viridiaurata (Bates, 1889)

Synonyms
- Helionica denticornis Kraatz, 1898; Helionica waterstradtii Kraatz, 1898; Helionica westwoodi Thomson, 1880; Prigenia viridiaurata Bates, 1889

= Theodosia viridiaurata =

Species of beetle

Theodosia viridiaurata are beetles from the family Scarabaeidae, subfamily Cetoniinae, tribe Phaedimini.

== Description ==
Theodosia viridiaurata can reach a length of 38–52 millimetres (1.5–2.0 in). The basic colour of the body is metallic green, but the elytra may be coppery or golden coloured. These scarab beetles bear a long lower horn and a second long horn on the pronotum. These impressive horns are usually reddish or purplish.

== Distribution ==
This quite rare species can be found in Eastern Borneo.
