= Theodosia =

Theodosia can refer to:

== People ==
- Theodosia (given name), a given name, including a list of people with the name
- Theodosia of Tyre, 3rd century Christian martyr
- Theodosia (fl. 6th century), first wife of Liuvigild, Visigothic King of Hispania and Septimania
- Theodosia of Constantinople, 7th–8th century Byzantine nun, martyr and saint of the Eastern Orthodox Church
- Theodosia, wife of Leo V (c. 775–c. 826), Empress consort of Leo V the Armenian
- Theodosia Bartow Prevost, wife of Aaron Burr (c.1746- c.1794)
- Theodosia Burr Alston, daughter of Aaron Burr. (c.1783 - c.1813)

== Places ==
- Feodosiya, sometimes spelled Theodosia or Feodosia, a city in Crimea, Ukraine (currently occupied by the Russian Federation)
- Feodosiya municipality
- Theodosia, Missouri, a village in the USA
- Theodosia Inlet, an inlet in the South Coast region of British Columbia, Canada
  - the Theodosia River, a river feeding that inlet
- Dumbarton in Scotland, which was given the name Theodosia in the highly-successful forgery De Situ Britanniae

== Animals ==
- Theodosia (beetle), a genus of beetles

== Ships ==
- Theodosia (ship)
- HMS Theodosia

== Fictional characters ==
- Theodosia Burr Alston, in the book My Theodosia by Anya Seton
- Theodosia Throckmorton, main character in Theodosia and the Serpents of Chaos, a children's novel by R.L. LaFevers
  - The television series based on the novel, Theodosia
- Theodosia, from the play The Royal Master by James Shirley

== See also ==
- Theodora (disambiguation)
- "Dear Theodosia", a song from the musical Hamilton
