= Okeover Arm Provincial Park =

Provincial park of British Columbia

- IUCN category II (national park)
- Location within Vancouver Island Location within British Columbia
- Interactive map of Okeover Arm Provincial Park
- Location: British Columbia, Canada
- Nearest city: Powell River
- Coordinates: 49°59′27″N 124°42′55″W
- Area: 0.03 km^{2} (0.012 sq mi)
- Established: 1979
- Governing body: BC Parks

Okeover Arm Provincial Park is a provincial park in British Columbia, Canada. The park is located on the west side of Okeover Inlet facing Desolation Sound, on the east side of the Malaspina Peninsula.
