= Malaspina Strait =

River in Canada

Coordinates: 49°40′00″N 124°15′00″W

Malaspina Strait is a strait in the northern Gulf of Georgia-Sunshine Coast region of British Columbia, Canada. It separates Texada Island from the upper Sunshine Coast-Malaspina Peninsula area on the adjacent mainland.

The strait and the peninsula were named in 1859 by Captain George Henry Richards of the Plumper in honour of Alessandro Malaspina, an Italian noble and Spanish naval officer who commanded one of the exploration ships during the Spanish exploration of the British Columbia Coast. Richards' choice of name was probably influenced by the nearby Malaspina Inlet, named in 1792 by Galiano and Valdés, who had been officers serving under Malaspina.
