= Lancelot Smith =

Australia international rugby union player (1885–1956)

- Born: Lancelot Machattie Smith circa 1885 Bathurst, New South Wales
- Died: March 1956 Orange, New South Wales

Rugby union career
- Position: centre
International career
Years	Team	Apps	(Points)
1905	Australia	1	(0)

Lancelot Machattie "Mac" Smith (c. 1885 - March 1956) was a rugby union player who represented Australia.

Smith, a centre, was born in Bathurst, New South Wales and claimed one international rugby cap for Australia, playing against New Zealand, at Dunedin, on 2 September 1905.
