= John Coode =

John Coode may refer to:

- John Coode (engineer) (1816–1892)
- John Coode (Governor of Maryland) (c. 1648–1709)
