= Lancelot Colson =

English astrologer and medical practitioner

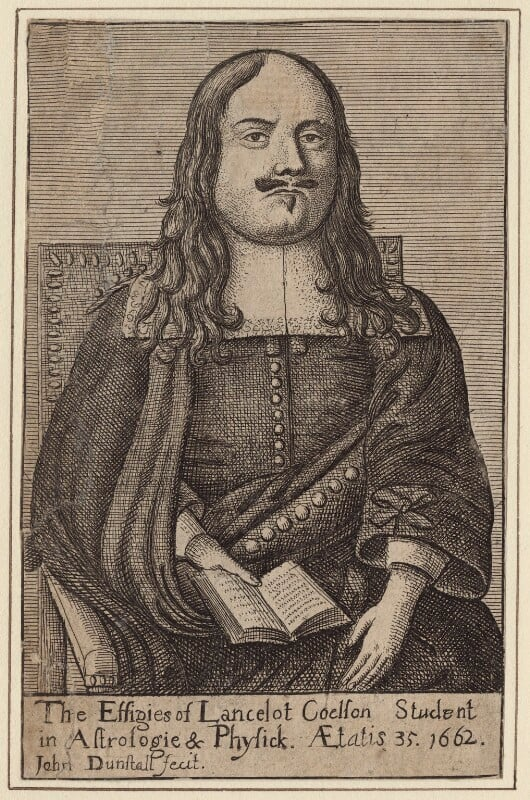
- Colson by John Dunstall
- Born: 1627
- Died: c. 1687
- Occupations: Astrologer and medical practitioner

Lancelot Colson (1627 – circa 1687), also called Lancelot Coelson or Lancelot Coulson, was an English astrologer and medical practitioner.

== Biography ==
Colson was an astrologer who practised at the sign of the Royal Oak on Great Tower Hill. His almanack or ephemeris was published there from 1660 to 1676, together with his "Philosophia Maturata, an Exact Piece of Philosophy, containing the practick and operative part thereof in gaining the philosopher's stone," &c. (London, 1668, 12mo). This volume was one of the leading works on the philosopher's stone.
