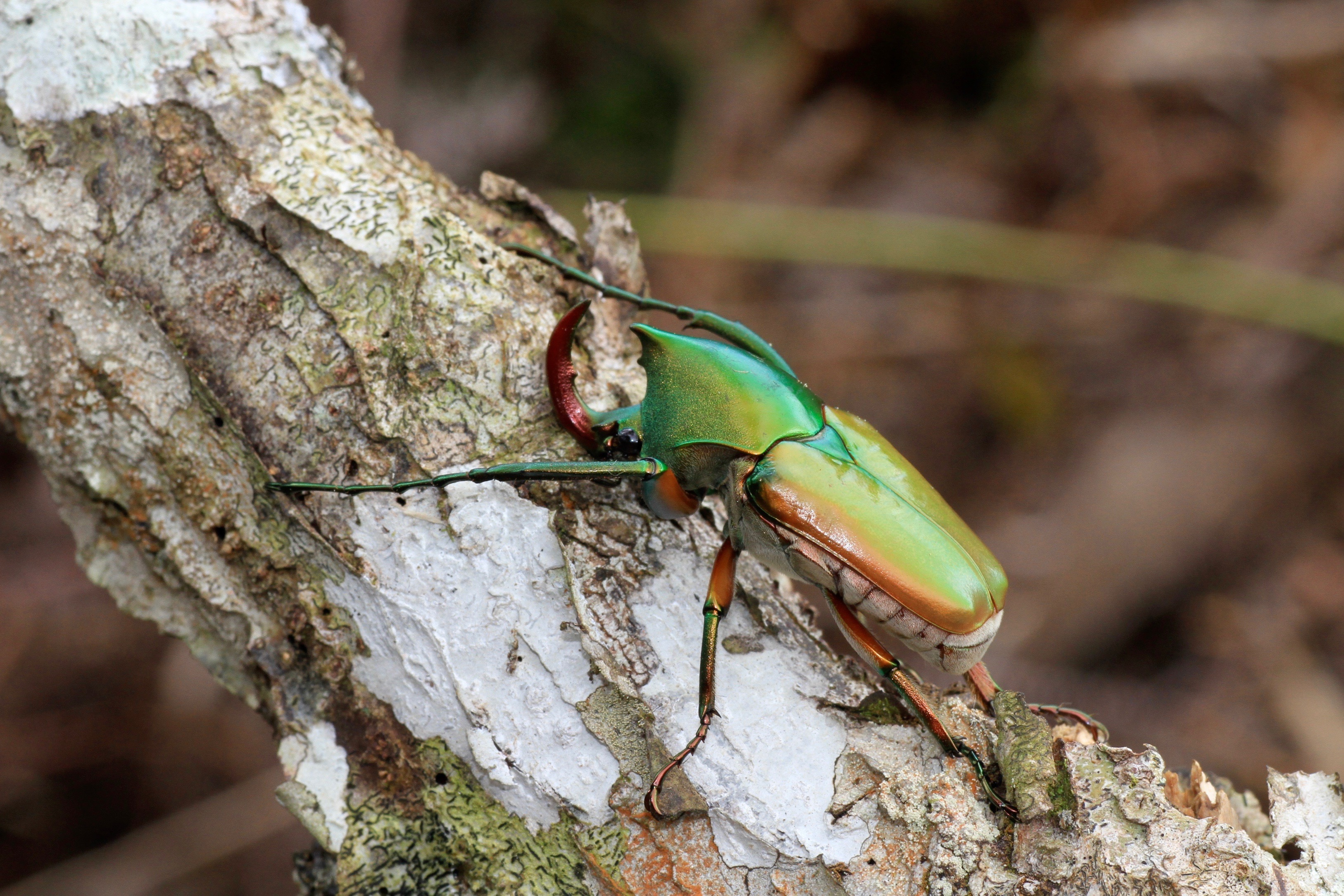
- Theodosia chewi, Borneo

Scientific classification
- Domain: Eukaryota
- Kingdom: Animalia
- Phylum: Arthropoda
- Class: Insecta
- Order: Coleoptera
- Suborder: Polyphaga
- Infraorder: Scarabaeiformia
- Family: Scarabaeidae
- Subfamily: Cetoniinae
- Tribe: Phaedimini
- Genus: Theodosia; Thomson, 1880

Subgenera
- Hemitheodosia Sakai, 1994; Theodosia Thomson, 1880

Synonyms
- Atopocerus Kraatz, 1888; Westwoodia Laporte, 1873

= Theodosia (beetle) =

Genus of beetles

Theodosia is a genus in the scarab beetle family Scarabaeidae. There are about 19 described species in Theodosia, found in Southeast Asia.

== Species ==
These 19 species belong to the genus Theodosia:

- Theodosia antoinei Nagai, 1998 (Indonesia)
- Theodosia chewi Ochi, 1993 (Malaysia)
- Theodosia howitti (Castelnau, 1873) (Malaysia)
- Theodosia katsurai Sakai, 1994 (Indonesia, Malaysia)
- Theodosia magnifica Rothschild & Jordan, 1893)
- Theodosia maindroni Bourgoin, 1910 (Indonesia)
- Theodosia miyashitai Sakai, 1997 (Malaysia)
- Theodosia nagai Legrand & Chew Kea Foo, 2010 (Malaysia)
- Theodosia nobuyukii Nagai, 1998)
- Theodosia normanwongi Legrand & Bosuang, 2015 (Malaysia)
- Theodosia perakensis Moser, 1901)
- Theodosia pilosipygidialis Nagai, 1998)
- Theodosia rodorigesi Nagai, 1980 (Philippines)
- Theodosia rothschildi Janson, 1903 (Malaysia)
- Theodosia sakaii Nagai, 1998 (Indonesia)
- Theodosia telifer (Bates, 1889) (Malaysia)
- Theodosia viridiaurata (Bates, 1889) (Malaysia)
- Theodosia viridicollis (Kraatz, 1898) (Indonesia)
- Theodosia westwoodi (Thomson, 1880) (Malaysia)
