= Lancelot Robinson =

English cricketer

Personal information
- Full name: Lancelot Charles Digby Robinson
- Born: 23 October 1905; England
- Died: 31 May 1935 (aged 29); Quetta, Baluchistan, British India
- Batting: Right-handed
- Bowling: Right-arm slow
- Role: Batsman

Domestic team information
- Years: Team
- 1934: Marylebone Cricket Club

Career statistics
Competition	First-class
Matches	1
Runs scored	39
Batting average	39.00
100s/50s	0/0
Top score	39
Catches/stumpings	0/–
- Source: CricketArchive, 20 April 2023

Lancelot Charles Digby Robinson (23 October 1905 – 31 May 1935) was an English first-class cricketer.

Robinson was educated at Bedford School and played as an all-rounder for their cricket XI, topping their bowling averages in 1922. He moved in 1924 to the Royal Military College, Sandhurst. It was then that he also started playing for Bedfordshire in the Minor Counties Championship.

His only first-class appearance came in 1934, against Ireland at College Park, Dublin. Playing for the Marylebone Cricket Club, Robinson came in at eight in the batting order and was his side's second top scorer with 39 runs, in what would be his only innings.

A captain with the Royal Army Ordnance Corps, Robinson was killed, along with his wife, in the 1935 Quetta earthquake.
