= Toba Inlet =

Fjord in British Columbia, Canada

- French: Baie Toba
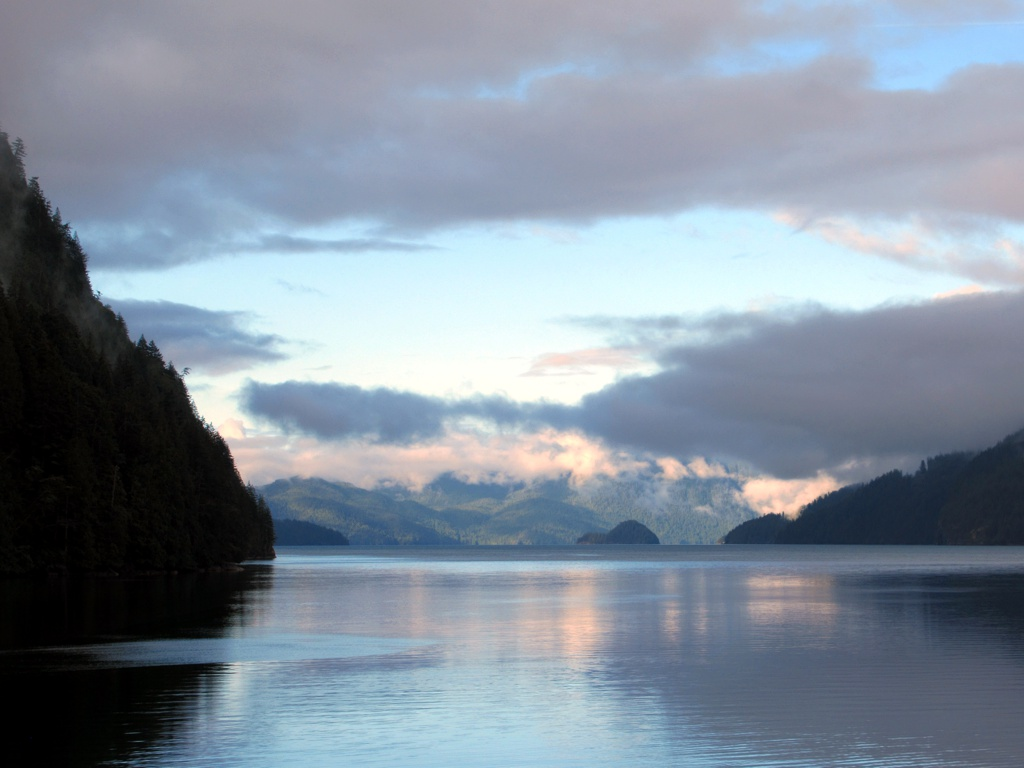
- Looking southwest toward the mouth of Toba Inlet

- Location within British Columbia

- Toba Inlet extends northeast from East Redonda Island
- Location: Strathcona RD, British Columbia
- Coordinates: 50°24′39″N 124°36′14″W
- Type: Fjord
- Primary inflows: Toba River
- Primary outflows: Pryce Channel, Homfray Channel
- Max. length: 35 kilometres (22 mi)

Toba Inlet is one of the lesser, but still principal, inlets of the British Columbia Coast. It is fourth in the series north from the 49th parallel which begins with Burrard Inlet, which is the harbour for the city of Vancouver. Between it and Jervis Inlet to its east, however, there is a freshwater fjord, Powell Lake, which has been augmented by a small hydro project to supply power to the large pulp mill at Powell River, the principal town of the Malaspina Peninsula of the upper Sunshine Coast. Klahoose 1 Reserve, of the Klahoose First Nation is at the mouth of Toba River at the Head of Toba Inlet. Toba Inlet and the Toba Valley is home to many grizzly bears.

== Geography ==
Toba Inlet is relatively short in comparison to the other major coastal inlets, being only about 2.5 km (1.6 mi) in average width and 35 km (22 mi) from the mouth of the powerful (but short) Toba River to the inlet's mouth at the junctions of Pryce Channel and Homfray Channel at the north tip of East Redonda Island.

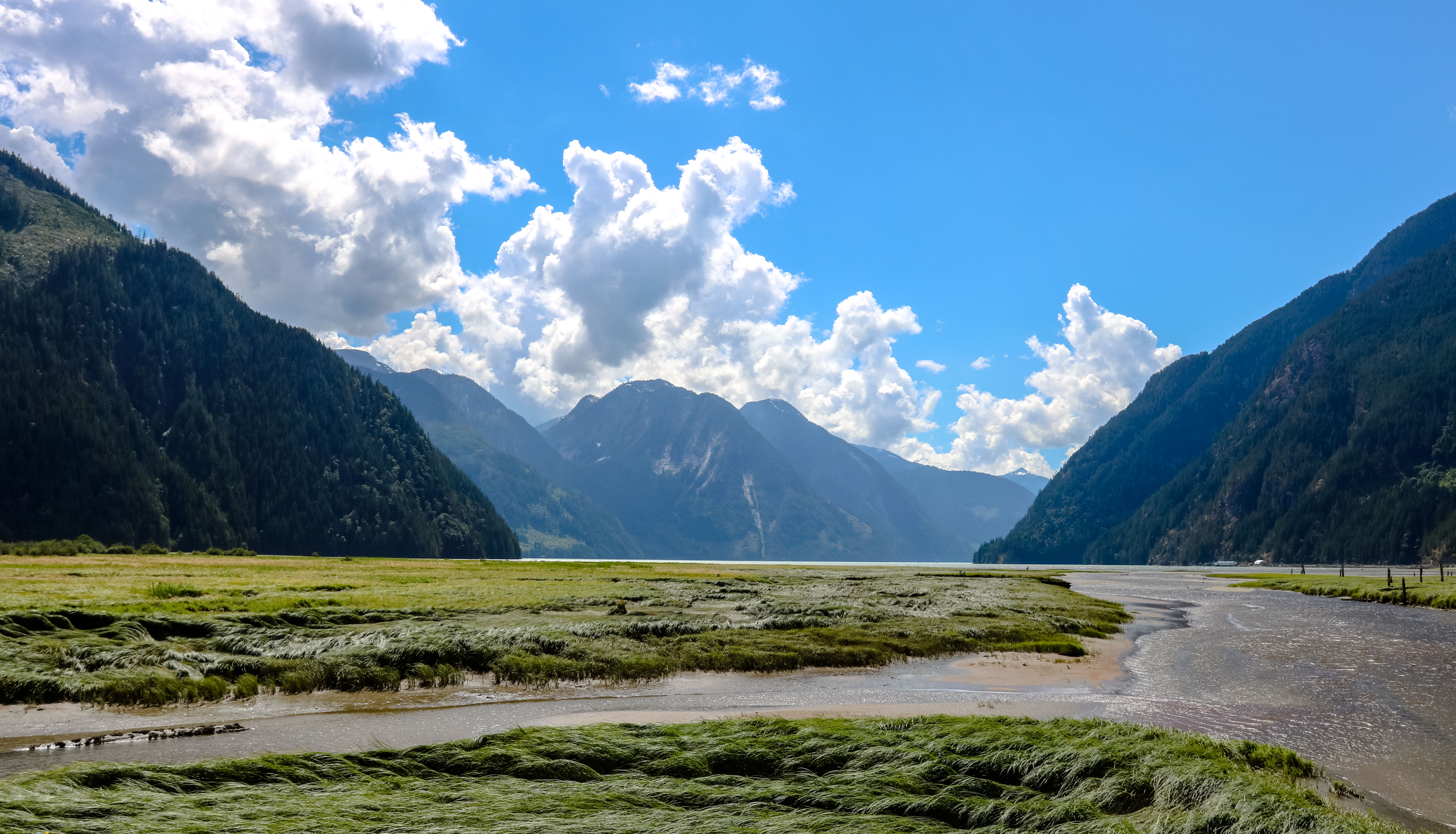
Toba Inlet, British Columbia

== History ==
The first non-indigenous exploration of Toba Inlet occurred in 1792 when British and Spanish expeditions arrived in the area simultaneously. There was cooperation between the British under George Vancouver and the Spanish under Dionisio Alcalá Galiano. From a base of operation in Desolation Sound boats were sent out to explore the region. On June 25, 1792, Vancouver proposed sending out three parties in boats. The Spanish offered to take on one of the three, this being the investigation of Toba Inlet. Caytetano Valdés left with a boat party early on June 25, and returned on June 27, having determined that the inlet was closed. He described it as being of great depth, with steep shores and high peaks around. On its east shore Valdés found a plank ("tabla" in Spanish) covered with paintings, which he described as "hieroglyphics of the natives". There were several empty villages. The Spanish encountered no inhabitants. Valdés named the inlet after the plank he found, Canal de la Tabla. The British examined the inlet just after Valdés, confirming for themselves the Spanish report. Vancouver kept the Spanish name, which a Spanish map engraver's mistake had changed to its present form of Toba Inlet.

Toba Inlet's Coast Salish name is Yekwamen (phonetic) or yɛkʷamɛn (orthography).

== See also ==
- List of fjords in Canada
- Albert Ostman
