= Alterra Power =

Renewable power generation company based in Vancouver, British Columbia, Canada

Alterra Power Inc.
- Company type: Subsidiary
- Traded as: TSX: INE
- Industry: Renewable energy
- Predecessor: Magma Energy; Plutonic Power
- Headquarters: Vancouver, Canada
- Key people: Michel Letellier (president and CEO); Jean Perron (CFO)
- Products: Run-of-the-river hydroelectricity Wind power Solar Power
- Parent: Innergex Renewable Energy
- Website: www.innergex.com

Alterra Power Corp. a subsidiary of Innergex Renewable Energy Inc., is a diversified renewable power generation company based in Vancouver, British Columbia, Canada. It was formed in 2011 through the merger of Magma Energy Corp. and Plutonic Power Corp. It develops, owns, acquires and operates hydroelectric, wind, solar energy and geothermal projects. On February 6, 2018, Innergex Renewable Energy Inc. completed the acquisition of Alterra including all its assets.

Toba Montrose Run of River Power Plant Intake

== Merger ==
On 7 March 2011, it was announced that Magma Energy and Plutonic Power would merge to create Alterra Power Corp. Magma Energy was renamed Alterra Power and each shareholder of Plutonic Power received 2.38 shares of Magma for each Plutonic share held. At the time, the merged company owned two geothermal power plants in Iceland, and one in Nevada (since sold), one run of river hydro plant and one wind farm in British Columbia and an option on a solar project in Ontario.

== Power plants ==
Name	Technology	Location	Nameplate Capacity
Toba Montrose	Run of river	British Columbia, Canada	235 MW
Kokomo	Solar power	Indiana, USA	7 MW
Dokie 1	Wind power	British Columbia, Canada	144 MW
Shannon	Wind power	Texas, USA	204 MW
Spartan	Wind power	Michigan, USA	13.5 MW

== Projects ==
=== Toba Montrose Hydro ===
East Toba River (123MW) and Montrose Creek (73MW) are two run-of-river hydroelectric plants 18 km apart, they have operated since 2010 with a combined capacity of 196 MW and generate an average of 720 GWh of electricity annually, which is contracted to B.C. Hydro until 2045.

==== Upper Toba Valley ====
The Upper Toba Valley Hydroelectric project originally planned two renewable power facilities constructed 90 km north of Powell River, BC at the headwaters of Toba Inlet. The first is on Jimmie Creek, which flows west into Toba River, and the second on the Upper Toba River. The installed capacity of the two facilities was to be 124 MW with an expected annual energy generation of 316 GWh/yr. Alterra received an Energy Purchase Agreement from BC Hydro to construct the Upper Toba facility. In 2013 Alterra also received an Energy Purchase Agreement from BC Hydro to construct the 62MW Jimmie Creek facility. In 2016 Alterra Power Corp. announced that the Jimmie Creek facility had achieved its full output of 62 MW. It is located at 50.568962°N 124.072627°W.

=== Solar power expansions ===
In early 2011, Plutonic Power agreed, together with GE Energy financial Services, to purchase three proposed photovoltaic power plants in Ontario from First Solar. The three plants will have a total capacity of 50 MW, divided between Amherstburg (10MW), Belmont (20MW) and Walpole (20MW). This represents a first venture into solar power for Plutonic Power, although engineering, procurement, construction and operation will still be provided by First Solar.

== HS Orka's controversy ==
In 2010, during the Icelandic financial crisis, Magma Energy acquired 98.5% of shares in the Icelandic geothermal power company HS Orka. The deal created an opposition in Iceland. On May 21, 2010, Icelandic singer Björk wrote an open letter in the newspaper Reykjavík Grapevine, calling on the Icelandic government to "do everything in its power to revoke the contracts with Magma Energy". The deal was approved by the Icelandic Government. In 2016, Alterra owned 67%, while the Icelandic pension funds held 33%. In 2019, Alterra sold off its shares in HS Orka to Macquarie Infrastructure and Real Assets (MIRA).
