= Homfray Channel =

- French: Canal Homfray
- Thee chum mi yich (Coast Salish languages)
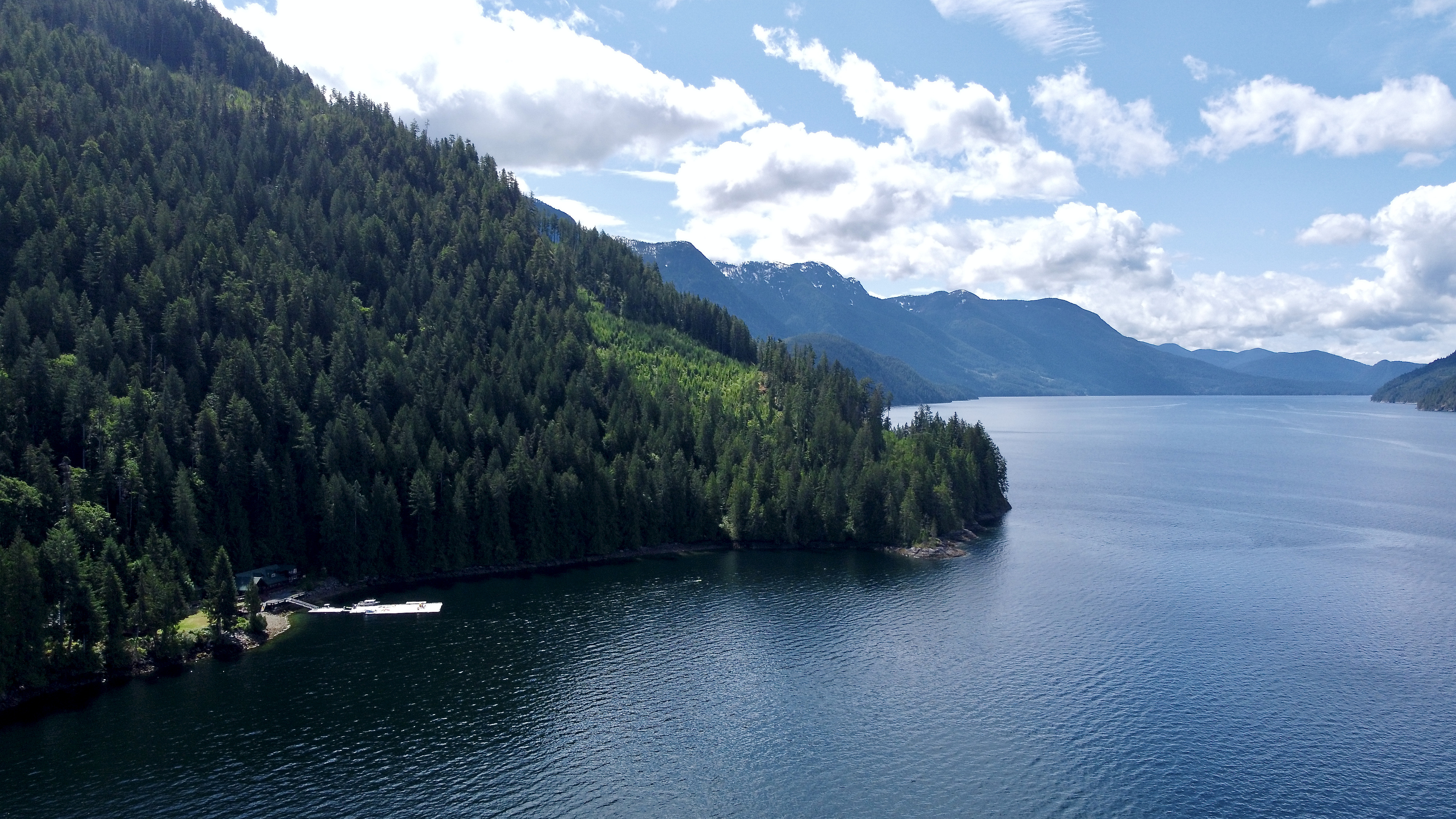

- Location within British Columbia

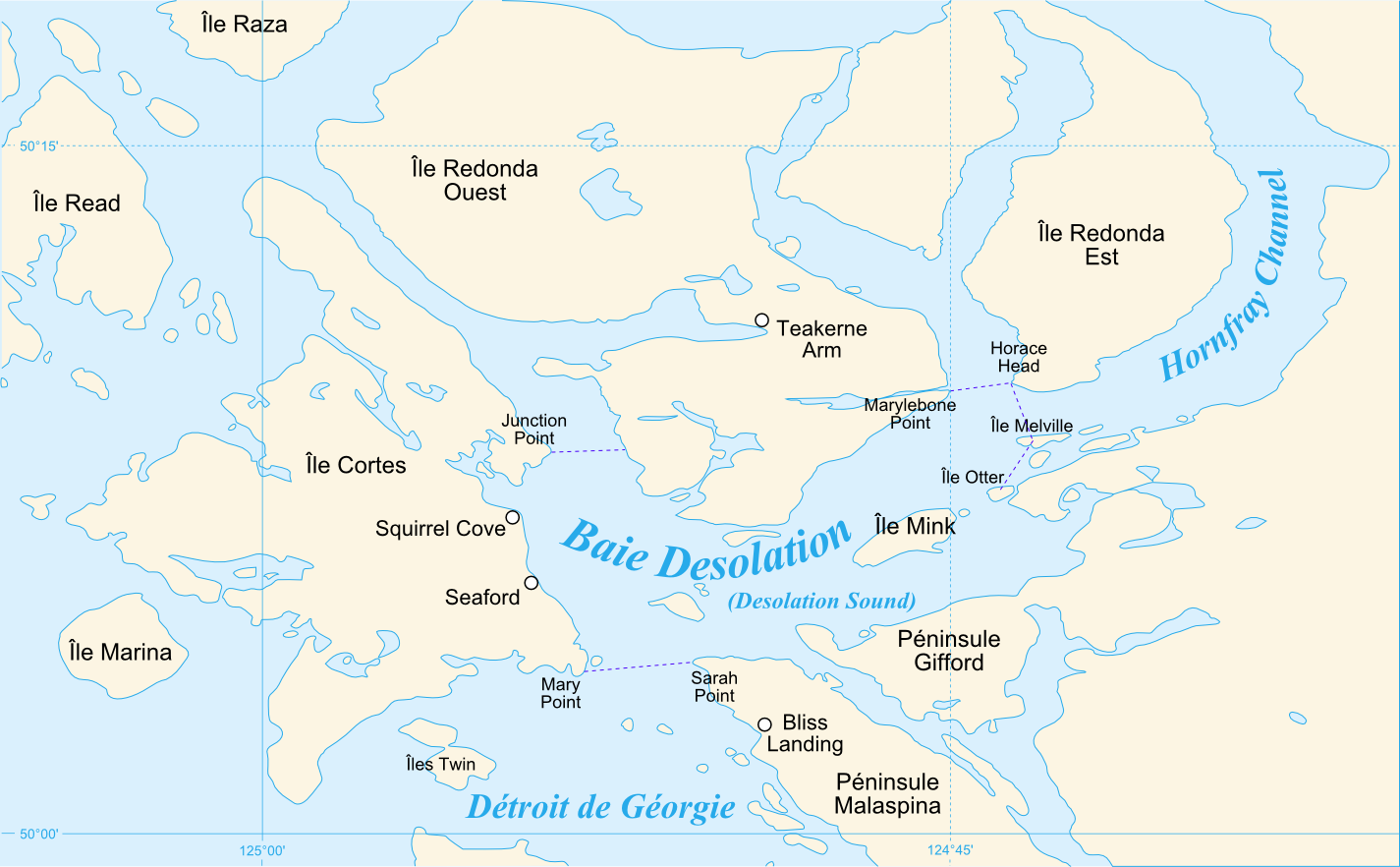
- Homfray Channel is located between East Redonda Island and the mainland coast of British Columbia
- Location: Desolation Sound, Discovery Islands, British Columbia
- Coordinates: 50°13′45″N 124°37′52″W
- Type: Strait
- Primary inflows: Toba Inlet
- River sources: Forbes Creek, Homfray Creek, Lloyd Creek
- Ocean/sea sources: Salish Sea

Homfray Channel is a deep water channel, reaching depths of 731 meters (2400 feet), located between East Redonda and the mainland coast of British Columbia, Canada.

== Geography ==
Homfray Channel connects Desolation Sound to the southwest with Toba Inlet to the north. The channel features several small bays along its eastern shores, the largest being Forbes Bay, which has a Klahoose name of AHPOKUM.

The channel contains several islands, the largest of these islands being Melville Island and Eveleigh Island.

== History ==
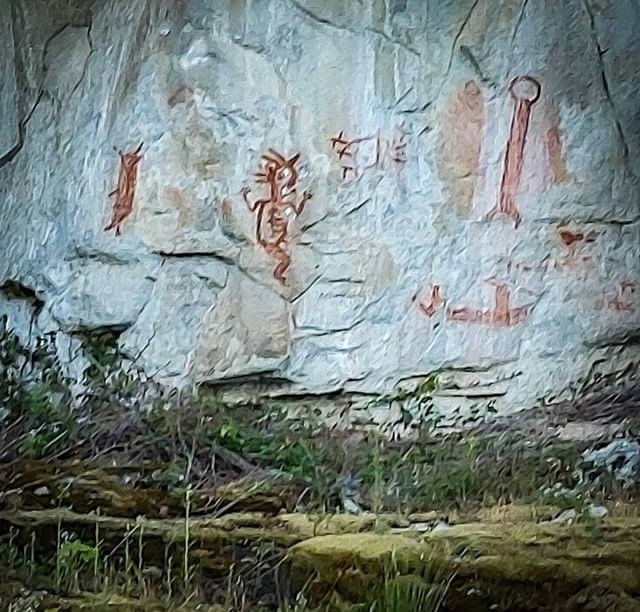
Pictoglph in Homfray Channel

Homfray Channel's Coast Salish name is Thee chum mi yich, meaning "further back inside". The channel is within the territory of the Klahoose First Nation.

The channel was named after Robert Homfray, Civil Engineer, b.1824 d, 1902. Homfray attempted to find a better way to the Chilcotin Gold fields via Bute Inlet with the aid of a Klahoose Chief.

== Hydrology ==
Homfray Channel delineates part of the northern limit of the Salish Sea.

== See also ==
- Lewis Channel
- Waddington Channel
- Desolation Sound
- Toba Inlet
