= Arthur Coode =

English cricketer

Arthur Trevenen Coode (5 February 1876 – 28 December 1940) was an English first-class cricketer active from 1898 to 1901 who played for Middlesex. Coode was born in St Helier, Jersey and died in Hazlemere.
