= Theodosia Inlet =

Inlet in British Columbia

Theosodia Inlet
- toqʷanan (Comox)
- Location within British Columbia
- Location: Sunshine Coast (British Columbia)
- Coordinates: 50°00′14″N 124°40′41″W
- Basin countries: Canada

Theodosia Inlet is an inlet in the Desolation Sound region of the South Coast region of British Columbia, Canada, located east of Lancelot Inlet, a sub-inlet of Malaspina Inlet. The inlet is fed by the Theodosia River. The locality of Theodosia Arm is located near its outlet at the head of Thors Cove.

== See also ==
- Theodosia (disambiguation)
