= Klahoose =

Indigenous people of British Columbia

Klahoose First Nation
- Band No. 553
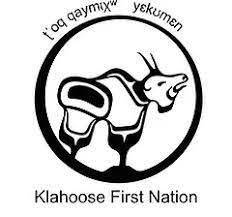
- Klahoose First Nation

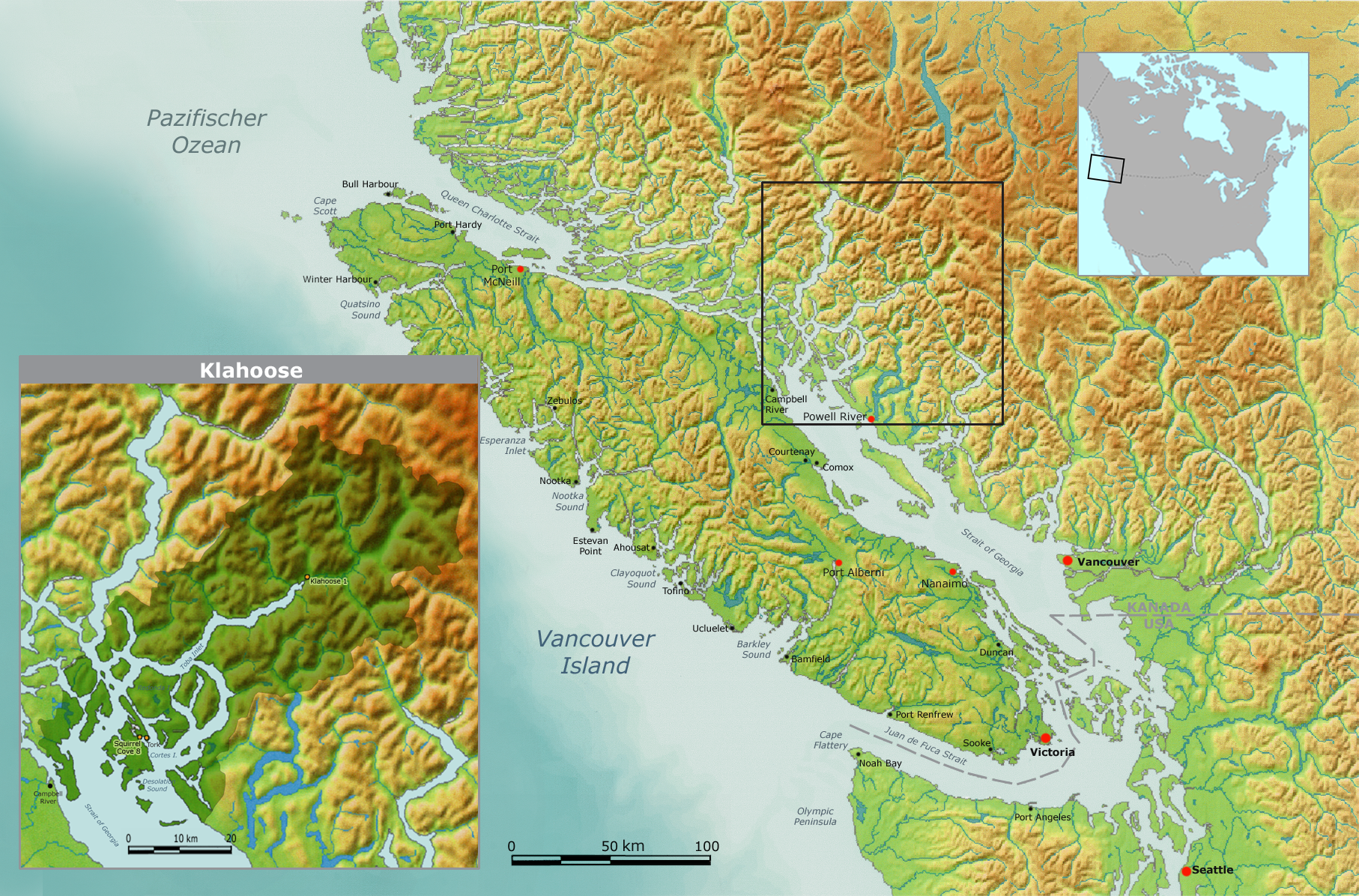
- Map showing traditional territory of the Klahoose people
- Headquarters: Squirrel Cove
- Province: British Columbia

Land
- Other reserves: List: Ahpokum 9; Deep Valley 5; Klahoose 1; Quaniwsom 2; Quequa 6; Salmon Bay 3; Siakin 4; Squirrel Cove 8; Tatpo-Oose 10; Tork 7
- Land area: 13.6 km^{2} (5.3 sq mi)

Population (2024)
- On reserve: 66
- On other land: 18
- Off reserve: 372
- Total population: 456

Government
- Chief: Johnny Hanuse

Tribal Council
- Naut'sa mawt Tribal Council

Website
- www.klahoose.org

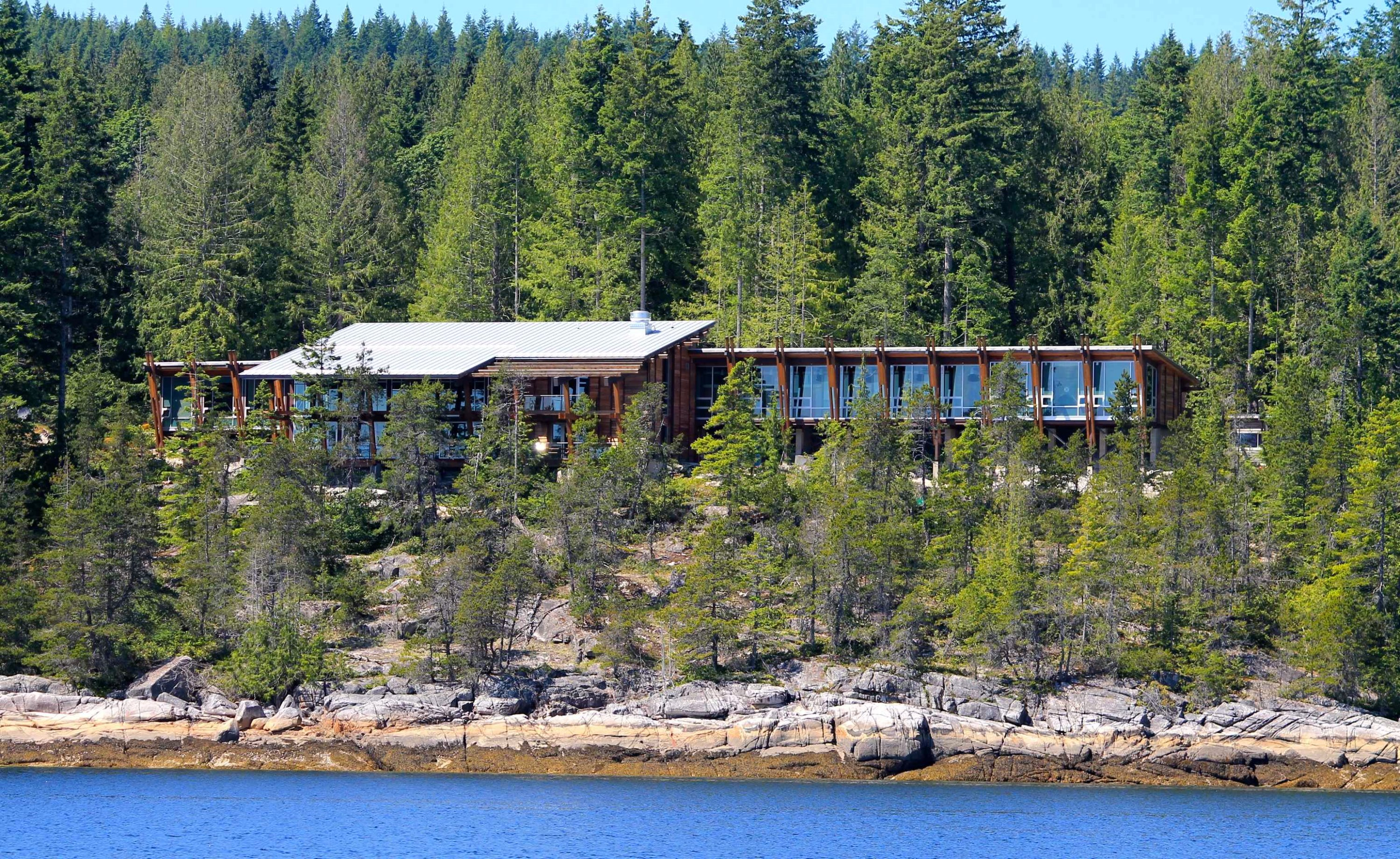
Klahoose Multipurpose Building

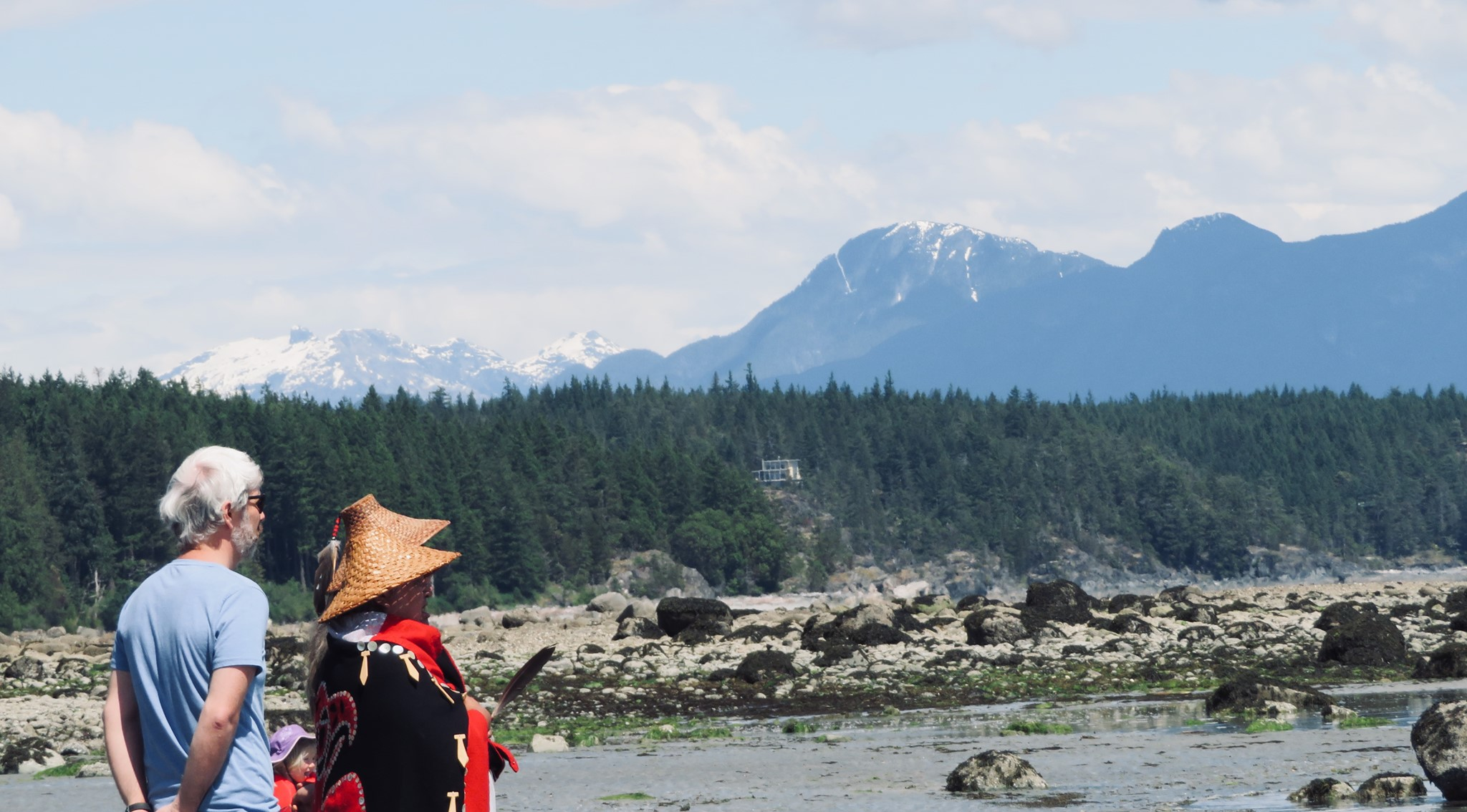
Klahoose First Nation

The Klahoose (Comox: ƛoʔos) are one of the three groups comprising the ʔayʔaǰuθəm Tla'amin or Mainland Comox. The other two divisions of this once-populous group are the Homalco (χʷɛmaɬku) and Tla'amin (ɬəʔamɛn) Nations. The Klahoose, Homalco and Tla'amin are, according to oral tradition, the descendants of the survivors of the Great Flood. The three groups were split by the Canadian federal government into different band councils but are known collectively as the Tla'amin, known as the Mainland Comox, and K’ómoks, the larger grouping of the Comox people, also known as the Island Comox and before the merger with the Laich-kwil-tach culture (which were known as the Sahtloot). Historically both groups are a subgroup of the Coast Salish though the K’ómoks name is from, and their language today, is the Lik'wala (Southern Kwakiutl) dialect of Kwak'wala. The ancestral tongue is the Comox language, though the Sahtloot/Island dialect is extinct.

The Klahoose are governed by the Klahoose First Nation and their main community is also called Klahoose, which is located on the eastern coast of Cortes Island. Before the Laich-kwil-tach migration to the Campbell River area, Klahoose traditional territory extended from there to Cortes Island though the latter is now also claimed by the Kwiakah, one of the four main groupings of the Laich-kwil-tach. Klahoose, the main Village for the Nation, is located at Squirrel Cove on Cortes Island has been growing over the years has a Health Centre, and 15,000 sq.ft, Multipurpose Building. The Multipurpose Building was built in 2010 and includes a health wing, fitness center, language lab, kitchen facilities and a three hundred person 'great room'.

The Klahoose First Nation has no year-round road access to a service centre and, as a result, experiences a higher cost of transportation. Serviced by BC Ferries, ferry connector service from Vancouver Island to Quadra Island and then Cortes Island.

Klahoose, at Squirrel Cove is home to approximately seventy-five full-time residents who live and work in the surrounding areas. The remaining Klahoose people, approximately three hundred, reside off reserve in BC coastal communities, lower mainland and in Washington State.

== Klahoose First Nation ==
The Klahoose First Nation is a First Nations band government, the Indian Act-mandated government for the Klahoose group of Mainland Comox, whose traditional territories are located on Cortes Island at the northern end of the Strait of Georgia, and surrounding Toba Inlet, in southwestern British Columbia, Canada. Their traditionally community is at the head of that inlet, and is also called Klahoose, which is the site of Klahoose Indian Reserve No. 1.

The Klahoose First Nation are currently negotiating independently with Canada and British Columbia in the B.C. treaty process. The Klahoose First Nation Incremental Treaty Agreement - 2009. Other negotiations include the First Nations Clean Energy Business Fund (FNCEBF) Revenue Sharing Agreements (Jimmie Creek Hydro Project) - 2014. Forestry agreements including the Klahoose First Nation Forest Consultation & Revenue Sharing Agreement - 2017 and the Klahoose First Nation Interim Agreement on Forest Opportunities - 2018.

The Klahoose First Nation is a member government of the Naut'sa mawt Tribal Council (NmTC).

The Klahoose First Nation reserves include:

=== AHPOKUM 9 (24 Ha) ===
Coast District at mouth of Forbes Creek, on Forbes Bay Homfray Channel in Desolation Sound. On the east shore of Homfray Channel at Forbes Bay, with a large stream fed by alpine lakes. Ahpokum (otherwise spelled as Aap'ukw'um) which means maggot, comes from legends recounted by Elders which tell of huge numbers of chum salmon spawning here.

=== DEEP VALLEY 5 (25 Ha) ===
Coast District on Quatam Bay, at mouth of the Quatam River East shore of Ramsay Arm. This was a fishing and temporary camp location.

=== KLAHOOSE 1 (923 Ha) ===
Coast District at mouth of Toba River at head of Toba Inlet Toba Inlet was historically significant location for hunting deer, catching salmon and ooligan and foraging for berries. The rivers geography enable a unique hunting techniques. It was the traditional winter location for the Klahoose peoples prior to movement of the village site to Squirrel Cove. Although there are current Klahoose members who were raised in Toba Inlet, there are currently no full-time residents.

=== QUANIWSOM 2 (0.3 Ha) ===
Coast District, near the mouth of Tahumming River, at the head of Toba Inlet. This area contains a cemetery, which was mainly active when residents still lived in Toba Inlet.

=== QUEQUA 6 (2 Ha) ===
New Westminster District, on West Redonda Island, on East shore of Lewis Channel Quequa is a fishing area with a rocky beach.

=== SALMON BAY 3 (70 Ha) ===
Coast District at head of Brem Bay, at mouth of Brem River North Side of Toba Inlet. Also known as Kwikwtichenam, this was a summer village while Klahoose 1 was still maintained as a winter site. Kwikwtichenam had historically good salmon and herring fishing grounds. The name means 'getting humpback salmon', referring to the reliability of catching pink salmon in the Brem River.

=== SIAKIN 4 (3 Ha) ===
New Westminster District, on West shore of East Redonda Island, near Dean Point at the mouth of two streams. Siakin was a fishing station specifically for dog fish. The name means 'your mouth', as it is the place at the mouth of the streams.

=== SQUIRREL COVE 8 (16 Ha) ===
Parenamn (also referred to as Tork A or also Squirrel Cove). Sayward District, East side of Cortes Island, at head of Squirrel Cove. Located wooded area in the north end of the bay that makes up Squirrel Cove. This site was used for fishing and for reliable planet foraging. The name Papenamn means 'to plant a garden or 'planted area'.

=== TATPO-OOSE 10 (12 Ha) ===
Sawyward District, on Southeast shore of Maurelle Island, looking out of Read Island and Hoskyn Channel/Surge Narrows. This site was used as a fishing village.

=== TORK 7 (283 Ha) ===
Toq (Tork) is the most populated village site and band office. Sawyward District, on East shore of Cortes Island at Squirrel Cove. The main village site of the Klahoose peoples, It supports a year-round population of approximately seventy-five full-time residents.

== See also ==
- Comox language
- Cortes Island
- Toba Inlet
- Homfray Channel
