= Okeover Inlet =

Inlet in British Columbia, Canada

- toχʷnač (Comox)
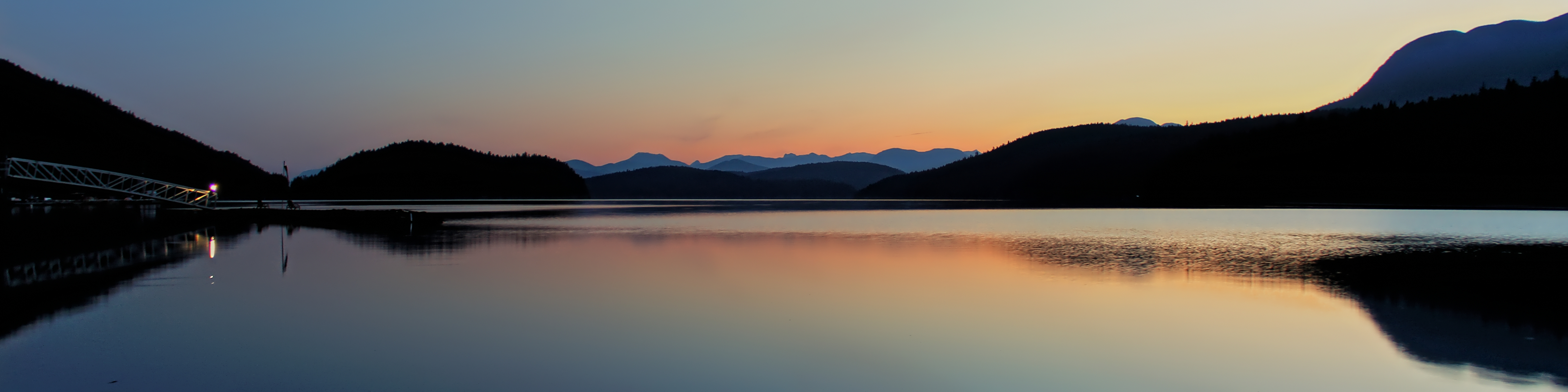
- Sunrise over Okeover Inlet

- Location within British Columbia
- Location: Sunshine Coast (British Columbia)
- Coordinates: 50°00′14″N 124°42′40″W
- Basin countries: Canada

Okeover Inlet, formerly Okeover Arm, is an inlet in the Sunshine Coast region of the southwestern mainland of British Columbia, Canada. It is the upper end of Malaspina Inlet and is northwest of the City of Powell River. Larsons Landing, a steamer landing, is located on its eastern shore.

Okeover Arm Provincial Park is located on its western shore.
