= Desolation Sound =

- French: Baie Desolation
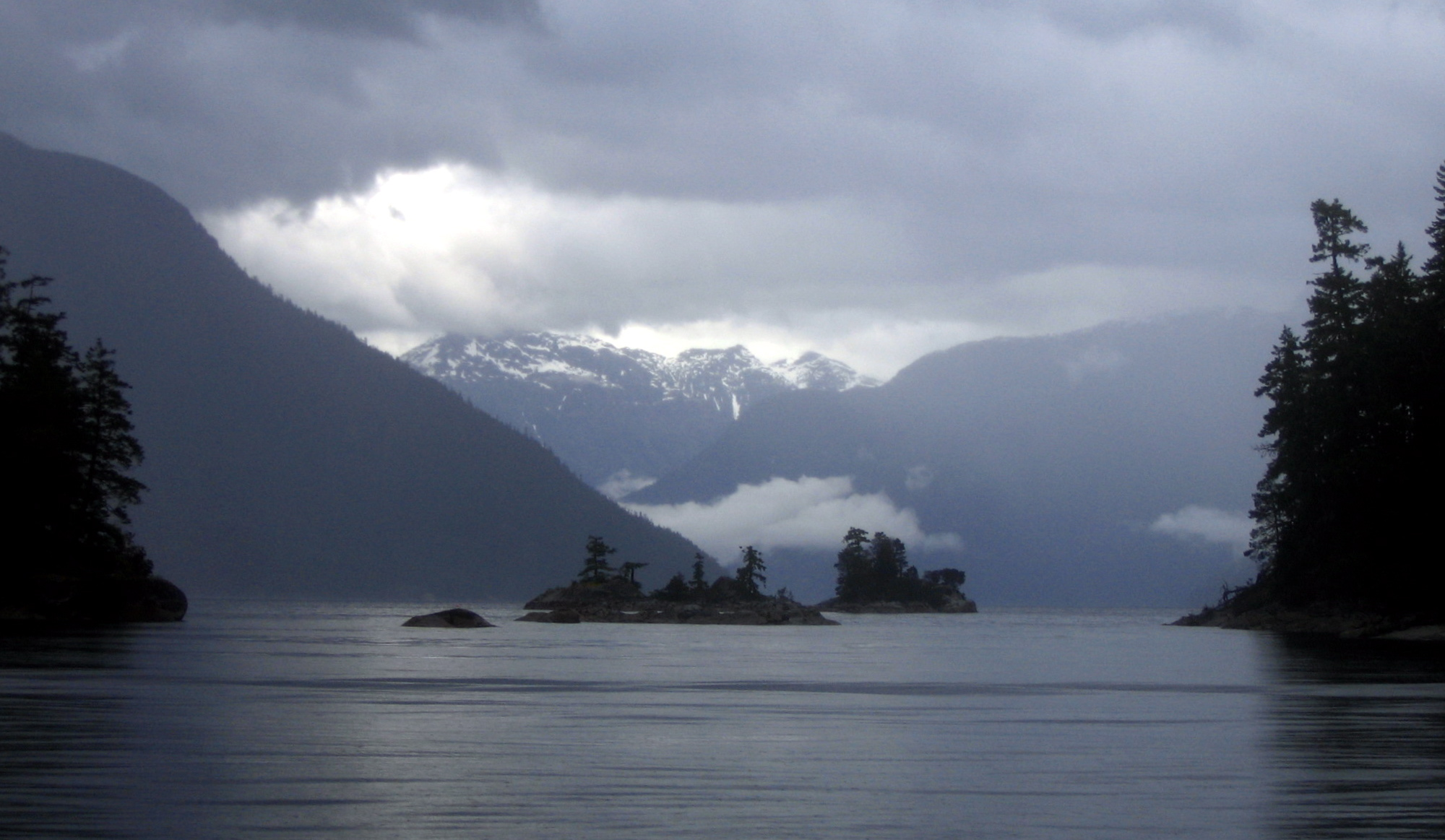
- Desolation Sound

- Location within British Columbia

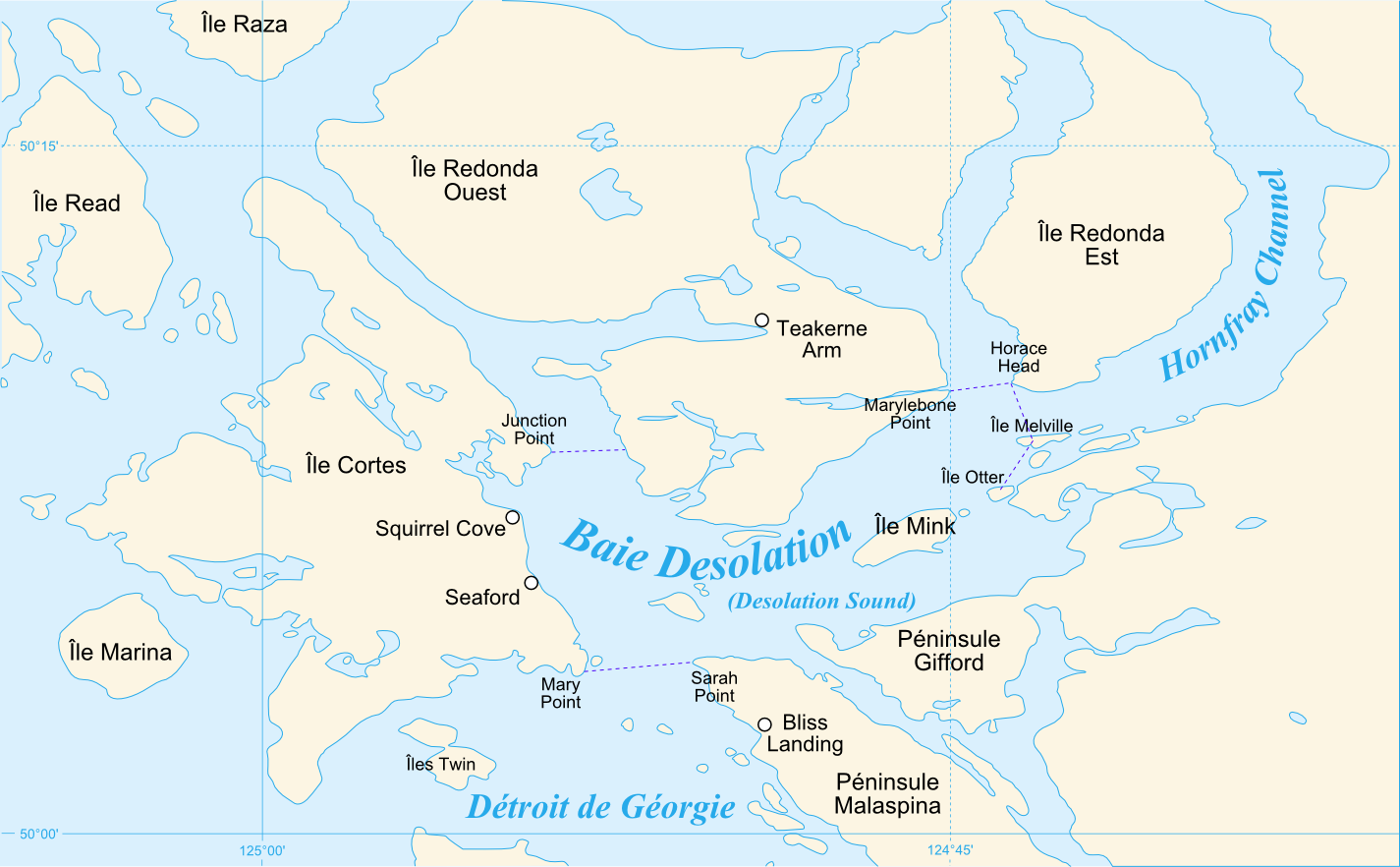
- Extent of Desolation Sound
- Location: Discovery Islands, British Columbia
- Coordinates: 50°07′20″N 124°45′30″W
- Type: Sound
- Part of: Salish Sea
- Islands: Kinghorn Island, Martin Islands, Mink Island, Protection Island, Station Island
- Settlements: Refuge Cove

Desolation Sound (French: Baie Desolation) is a deep water sound at the northern end of the Salish Sea and of the Sunshine Coast in British Columbia, Canada.

== History ==
Desolation Sound has always been inhabited by tribes of the Tla'amin and falls within the traditional territories of the Klahoose First Nation, Tla'amin Nation, and Homalco First Nations. In the summer of 1792, two expeditions led by Captains George Vancouver, Dionisio Alcalá Galiano and Cayetano Valdés y Flores arrived and cooperated in mapping the sound. Vancouver named it Desolation Sound, cryptically claiming that "there was not a single prospect that was pleasing to the eye".

== Geography ==
The sound is flanked by Cortes Island, East Redonda Island and West Redonda Island. Adjacent waterways include Lewis Channel (to the northwest), Waddington Channel (to the northeast), Homfray Channel (to the east), Okeover Inlet (to the southeast), and the Strait of Georgia (to the south).

Major provincial parks located within the sound include Desolation Sound Marine Provincial Park, Malaspina Provincial Park, Okeover Arm Provincial Park, and Roscoe Bay Provincial Park.

== Demographics ==
Refuge Cove is the only community in Desolation Sound. It is located on West Redonda Island and administered within Strathcona Regional District. The community serves as a centrally located supply stop for boaters and local fishers travelling in or near Desolation Sound.

=== Industries ===
The major industries of Desolation Sound include shellfish farming, forestry, and ecotourism.

== Transportation ==
Visitors travelling by car to Desolation Sound can take BC Ferries from Vancouver or Courtenay to Powell River, and drive the short distance northward to Lund.

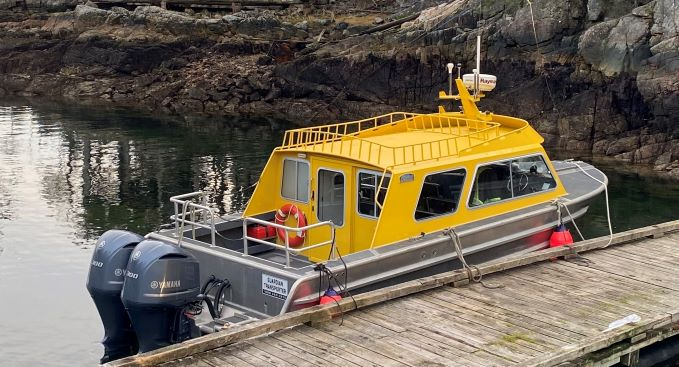
Savary Island Ferry at Dock

By boat or kayak from Lund, one can access the Copeland Islands (Copeland Islands Marine Provincial Park), Desolation Sound (which includes Desolation Sound Marine Provincial Park), and Malaspina Provincial Park.

Major anchorages include Gorge Harbour (on Cortes Island), Grace Harbour, Prideaux Haven (a cove on Homfray Channel), Refuge Cove, and Tenedos Bay.
