= Malaspina Peninsula =

Peninsula in British Columbia, Canada

Coordinates: 50°01′00″N 124°46′00″W

The Malaspina Peninsula is a peninsula in the northern Gulf of Georgia-Sunshine Coast region of British Columbia, Canada. It extends northwest from the town of Powell River, which lies near its isthmus, past the settlement of Lund, to Desolation Sound. This sound spans the opening of Toba Inlet, a fjord lying between Lund and the Discovery Islands to the west and northwest.

The Malaspina Peninsula is mountainous and is the traditional territory of the Sliammon group of the Mainland Comox indigenous people.

Like Malaspina Strait and the Malaspina Glacier further north in Alaska, the peninsula was named for Alessandro Malaspina, an Italian of noble birth in the Spanish navy who was among the many captains in the service of Spain who helped explore and chart the Alaska and British Columbia Coasts.

Malaspina Peninsula and Malaspina Strait were named in 1859 by Captain George Henry Richards of the Plumper. Richards' choice of name was probably influenced by the nearby Malaspina Inlet, named in 1792 by Galiano and Valdés, who had been officers serving under Malaspina.
