= List of BC Ferries ships =

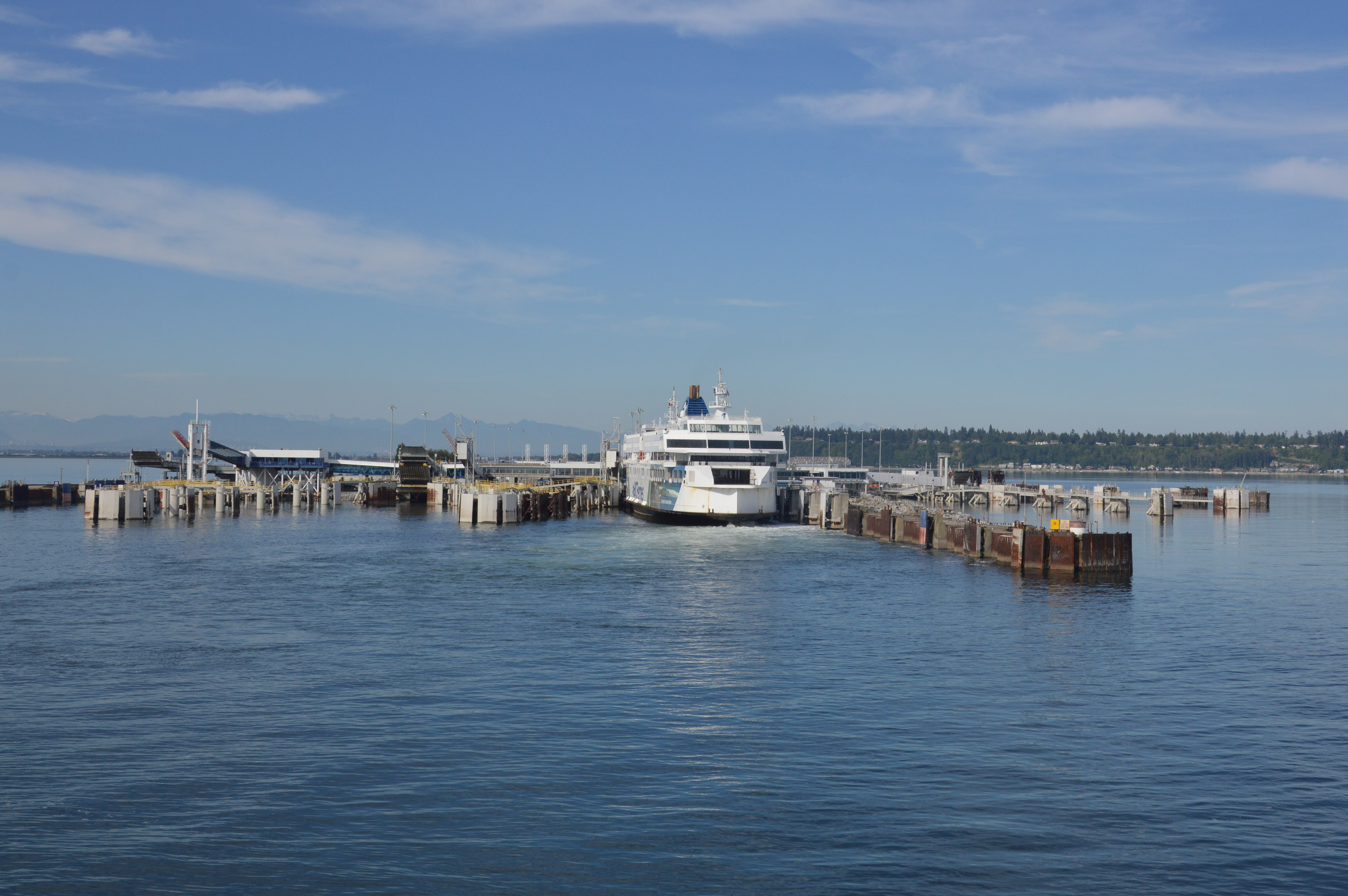
View of Tsawwassen Ferry Terminal (British Columbia, Canada) for BC Ferries

BC Ferries has the largest fleet of vehicle ferry vessels in the world. There are at least 45 vessels, ranging from small passenger-only water taxis, up to the 358-car Spirit-class ferries. All of the vessels in use by BC Ferries official routes are roll-on/roll-off car ferries, with the exception of those used on Route 13. Most of the major vessels are based on similar designs, which are aggregated into named classes.

== Current vessels ==
Route assignments current as of September 14, 2026.

Ferries used on Official routes:
Photo	Name	Class	Year built (Rebuilt)	Auto capacity	Passenger capacity	Notes	Route(s)
	Island G̲wawis	Island	2021	47	300	Hybrid diesel-electric; Entered service on April 12, 2022	19
	Island Kwigwis	Island	2021	47	300	Hybrid diesel-electric; Entered service on April 12, 2022	23
	Island K'ulut'a	Island	2020	47	300	Hybrid diesel-electric; Entered service on January 17, 2023	23
	Island Nagalis	Island	2020	47	300	Hybrid diesel-electric; Entered service on January 18, 2023	24
	Island Aurora	Island	2017–2019	47	300	Hybrid diesel-electric; Entered service on June 18, 2020	25
	Island Discovery	Island	2017–2019	47	300	Hybrid diesel-electric; Entered service on June 10, 2020	18
	MV Island xwsaĺux̌ul	Island	2024–2026	47	300	Hybrid diesel-electric; Entered service on June 20, 2026	19 (auxiliary)
	MV Island sarlequun	Island	2024–2026	47	300	Hybrid diesel-electric; entered service on September 14, 2026	19
	Salish Heron	Salish	2020	138	600	Entered service on May 6, 2022.	9A (primary) 5/5A & 17 (relief) 1 (relief in exigent circumstances)
	Salish Eagle	Salish	2016	138	600	Entered service in mid-2017.	9 (primary) 5/5A , 9A, & 17 (rotating relief vessel)
	Salish Raven	Salish	2016	138	600	Entered service on July 27, 2017.	5 (primary) 5A, 9/9A, & 17 (relief)
	Salish Orca	Salish	2016	138	600	Entered service on May 16, 2017.	17 (primary) 9/9A & 18 (relief)
	Baynes Sound Connector	None	2015	45	150	First and only cable ferry owned by BC Ferries. Also operates the world's longest cable ferry route. Entered service in February 2016.	21
	Northern Expedition	None	2009	115	600	Entered service on May 18, 2009.	10 (primary) 11 (relief)
	Coastal Celebration	Coastal	2007	310	1604	Formerly the world's largest double-ended ferries. Built in Germany. Entered service on November 21, 2008.	1 (primary) 30 (relief)
	Coastal Inspiration	Coastal	2007	310	1604	Formerly the world's largest double-ended ferries. Built in Germany. Entered service on June 16, 2008.	30 (primary) 1 (relief)
	Coastal Renaissance	Coastal	2007	310	1604	Formerly the world's largest double-ended ferries. Built in Germany. Entered service on March 8, 2008.	30 (primary) 1 & 2 (relief)
	Northern Adventure	None	2004	87	600	Purchased in late-2006 to replace the sunken Queen of the North.	11 (primary) 10 (relief)
	Northern Sea Wolf	None	2000	35	150	Purchased in 2017.	28A (primary) 28 (summer)
	Skeena Queen	Century	1997	92	450	Entered service in 1997.	4
	Spirit of Vancouver Island	Spirit	1994 (2018–2019)	358	2100	Converted to marine diesel and LNG in 2018. Entered service in 1994.	1
	Spirit of British Columbia	Spirit	1993 (2017–2018)	358	2100	Converted to marine diesel and LNG between 2017 and 2018. Entered service in 1992. Formerly, the Queen of Vancouver ran if this ferry was not running.	1
	Malaspina Sky	I	2008	112	450	Entered service in February 2009. Vessel was formerly known as Island Sky, and was renamed to avoid confusion with the Island-class ferries as part of BC Ferries fleet standardization initiative, on October 24, 2019.	7
	Queen of Cumberland	I	1992 (2016)	112	462	Entered service in late 1992.	5A (primary) 4, 5, 7, & 8 (relief)
	Queen of Capilano	I	1991 (2015)	100	460	Auto capacity increased from 85 in 2015. Entered service in June 1991. Was temporarily down for upgrades in 2024.	8
	Quinsam	Q	1982 (2010)	63	400	Transferred to BC Ferries in 1985.	6
	Quinitsa	Q	1977 (2008)	44	394	Transferred to BC Ferries in 1985.	22 (summer primary) 21 (relief primary) 6 & 19 (relief)
	Queen of Oak Bay	C	1981 (2005)	308	1494	Entered service in 1981.	2 (primary) 3 (relief)
	Queen of Surrey	C	1981 (2006)	308	1494	Entered service in 1981.	3 (primary) 2 (relief)
	Queen of Coquitlam	C	1976 (2003)	316	1494	Entered service in 1976.	3 (primary) 2/30 (relief)
	Queen of Cowichan	C	1976 (2004)	312	1494	Entered service in 1976.	2 (primary) 3 (relief)
	Queen of Alberni	C	1976 (1984/2007)	280	1200	Upper car deck added in 1984. Entered service in 1976.	30 (primary) 2 & 3 (fall, Labour Day weekend to Canadian Thanksgiving weekend) Unnumbered one-way Tsawwassen to Departure Bay route
	Pune'luxutth	K	1985 (2006)	26	269	Purchased in 2006. Vessel was formerly known as Kuper, and was renamed in the spirit of reconciliation, on December 1, 2023.	20
	Kwuna	K	1975	16	154	Transferred to BC Ferries in 1985.	26
	Kahloke	K	1973	21	200	Transferred to BC Ferries in 1985.	21 (summer relief primary) 22 (spring, fall, & winter primary) 12 & 20 (relief)
	Klitsa	K	1972	19	195	Transferred to BC Ferries in 1985.	12
	Queen of New Westminster	V	1964 (1973/ 1991/ 2009)	254	1332	Entered service on August 4, 1964.	1 (primary) 30 (relief in exigent circumstances)
	Stormaway III	None	n/k	0	40	Owned and operated by Kona Winds Yacht Charters Limited, under the sponsorship of and out of the Langdale terminal of BC Ferries, since 2003.	13 (Operated by Kona Winds Yacht Charters Ltd).
	Stormaway IV	None	n/k	0	40	Owned and operated by Kona Winds Yacht Charters Limited, under the sponsorship of and out of the Langdale terminal of BC Ferries, since 2010.	13 (Operated by Kona Winds Yacht Charters Ltd).
Ferries Used on Unofficial routes:
Photo	Name	Class	Year built (Rebuilt)	Auto capacity	Passenger capacity	Notes	Route(s)
	Nicola (also known as Spirit of Lax Kw' alaams)	N	1960	16	133	Transferred to BC Ferries in 1985; Owned by but not operated by BC Ferries.	Unnumbered Route (Operated by the Lax Kw'alaams First Nation).
	Centurion VII	None	1985	0	60	Owned and operated by Western Pacific Marine, under the sponsorship of BC Ferries, and out of Western Pacific Marine's French Creek Terminal, since 2011.	55 (Operated by Pacific Western Marine Ltd.).
	Spirit of Yalis	None	n/k	0	n/k	Owned and operated by Western Pacific Marine, as a water taxi/school trip ferry, under the sponsorship of Ferries.	25u (Operated by Pacific Western Marine Ltd.).
	Uchuck III	None	1942	0	100	Owned and operated by Get West Adventure Cruises, under the sponsorship of Ferries.	53 (Operated by Get West Adventure Cruises).
	Frances Barkley	None	1958	0	200	Owned and operated by Lady Rose Marine Services, under the sponsorship of Ferries.	59 (Operated by Lady Rose Marine Services).
	Tsimshian Storm	None	n/k	0	n/k	Owned by the communities of Kitkatla, Hartley Bay, and Metlakatla. Operated by the Gitxaala First Nation, under the sponsorship of BC Ferries.	60 (Owned by the Gitxaala First Nation, operated by North Co Corp.).
	Various vessels	None	n/k	0	n/k	Operated by various water taxi companies, under the sponsorship of BC Ferries.	51 (Operated by various water taxi companies).
	Various vessels	None	n/k	0	11-100	Operated by West Coast Launch, under the sponsorship of BC Ferries.	54 (Operated by West Coast Launch).

== Former vessels ==
Since the 1960s, BC Ferries has retired the following ferries:

Photo	Name	Class	Built (rebuilt)	Years in service	Auto capacity	Passenger capacity	Notes	Route(s) served	Refs
	MV Quillayute	None	1927	1961-1963	35	600	Acquired in Black Ball purchase	3	
	SS Smokwa	None	1946	1961-1966	46	473	Acquired in Black Ball purchase; named Scotian when built	3	
	MV Jervis Queen	None	1928	1961-1966	45	600	Acquired in Black Ball purchase, formerly named Bainbridge	3	
	MV George S. Pearson	None	1925	1961-1966	18	134	Acquired in Gulf Island Ferry Company purchase, previously named Fox Island and Wollochet	9/9A/5/5A	
	MV Cy Peck	None	1913 (1930)	1961-1966	18	135	Acquired in Gulf Island Ferry Company purchase; formerly named Island Princess and Daily	4	
	MV Sunshine Coast Queen	None	1952	1967-1976	180+	973	Originally named Vacationland and later Père Nouvel Sank while being towed for scrap December 3, 1987	3	
	MV Sechelt Queen	None	1947	1961-1976	83	670	Acquired in Black Ball purchase, originally named Chinook	3	
	MV Langdale Queen	None	1903 (1919/1926/1952)	1961-1976	80	600	Acquired in Black Ball purchase, formerly named Kahloke, City of Sacramento, and Asbury Park; scrapped in 2009	3	
	MV Dogwood Princess	None	1969	1969-1979	0	30		13	
	MV Dogwood Princess II	None	1979 (1985)	1979-2003	0	38	Received an engine upgrade in 1985	13	
	MV Pender Queen	None	1923 (1956)	1961-1980	40	250	Acquired in Gulf Island Ferry Company purchase, formerly named Motor Princess. Sunk and scrapped in 2003	9/9A/5/5A	
	MV Princess of Vancouver	Princess class	1955	1985-1987	150	984	Formerly part of the Ministry of Transportation and Highways' saltwater ferry fleet and the Canadian Pacific Railway	17	
	MV Queen of the Islands	None	1963	1963-1991	40	400	Sold in 1991, permanently moored in Mosquito Creek Marina in North Vancouver since 2009	4	
	MV Salt Spring Queen	None	1949	1961-1996	36	187	Acquired in Gulf Island Ferry Company purchase, formerly named Delta Princess. Sold and renamed Golden Queen.	4	
	MV Vesuvius Queen	None	1950	1962-1998	35	184	Originally named Lloyd Jones and sailed on Okanagan Lake, sold to R & G Importadora & Exportadora of the Dominican Republic in 1998	6	
	MV Queen of Sidney	Sidney	1960	1960-2000	138	989	First vessel built by BC Ferries, abandoned in 2000	1	
	MV Queen of Victoria	V	1962 (1970/1981)	1962-2000	286	1360	Stretched in 1970, upper deck added in 1981 to increase capacity; sold to R & G Importadora & Exportadora of the Dominican Republic in 2001	1	
	MV PacifiCat Explorer	PacifiCat	1998	1998-2000	235	1000	Video documentary filmed about the ship's construction	2	
	MV PacifiCat Discovery	PacifiCat	1999	1999-2000	235	1000		2	
	MV PacifiCat Voyager	PacifiCat	2000	Never	235	1000	Would have entered service in 2000	2	
	MV Albert J. Savoie	N	1961	1985-2002	16	133	Formerly part of the Ministry of Transportation and Highways' saltwater ferry fleet	22	
	MV Garibaldi II	N	1964 (1977)	1985-2006	Originally 16, later reduced to 7	133+	Formerly part of the Ministry of Transportation and Highways' saltwater ferry fleet, sold to Harbour Cruises via Woodfibre Pulp Mill in 2006. Listed for sale on Craigslist in 2020.	None	
	MV Queen of the North	None	1969	1974-2006	115	650	Purchased from Stena Line in 1974; formerly named Queen of Surrey and Stena Danica; sank in Wright Sound on March 22, 2006	10/11	
	MV Queen of Esquimalt	V	1963 (1969/1982)	1963-2008	376	1630	Stretched in 1969, upper deck added in 1982 to increase capacity	1	
	MV Queen of Tsawwassen	Sidney	1960	1960-2008	128	640		1/2/5/5A/9/9A	
	MV Queen of Saanich	V	1962 (1972/1982)	1962-2008	360	1672	Stretched in 1972, upper deck added in 1982 to increase capacity	1	
	MV Queen of Vancouver	V	1962 (1972/1981)	1962-2009	338	1670	Stretched in 1972, upper deck added in 1981 to increase capacity	1	
	MV Queen of Prince Rupert	None	1965	1965-2009	80	510	Last BC Ferry built at Victoria Machinery Depot	10/11	
	MV Mill Bay	None	1956	1969-2011	16	136	Acquired in 1969 purchase of Coast Ferries	12	
	MV Queen of Chilliwack	None	1978	1991-2015	115	400	Acquired by Goundar Shipping in 2015	7/28/28A/40	
	MV Tenaka	None	1964	1985-2016	24	244	Acquired by Lady Rose Marine Services in 2016	24	
	MV Queen of Burnaby	Burnaby	1965 (1972)	1965–1994; 2000-2017	168	904	Stretched in 1972 to increase capacity	17	
	MV Queen of Nanaimo	Burnaby	1964 (1974)	1964-2017	164	1163	Stretched in 1974 to increase capacity	9/9A	
	MV Howe Sound Queen	None	1964	1971-2019	52	300	Purchased in 1971. Sold at an auction for CA$210,000 in 2019	6	
	MV Nimpkish	N	1973	1985-2020	12	95	Transferred to BC Ferries in 1985	28/28A/40	
	MV North Island Princess	None	1958 (1971)	1969–1977; 1985-2020	38	150	Acquired in 1969 purchase of Coast Ferries; Transferred to Ministry of Transportation & Highways in 1977 and back to BC Ferries in 1985; currently for sale.	18	
	MV Bowen Queen	Powell River	1965 (1979)	1965-2022	61	400	Stretched in 1979 to increase capacity	3/6/8/9/9A/19/23	
	MV Mayne Queen	Powell River	1965 (1979)	1965-2022	58	400	Stretched in 1979 to increase capacity. Last full day of service on route 5 was November 19, 2022.	5/5A	
	MV Powell River Queen	Powell River	1965 (1979)	1965-2023	59	408	Stretched in 1979 to increase capacity. Currently for sale.	23	
	MV Tachek	T	1969 (2011)	1985-2026	26	243	Transferred to BC Ferries in 1985.	18/24	
	MV Quadra Queen II	T	1969 (2010)	1985-2020; 2025-2026	26	293	Transferred to BC Ferries in 1985.	21/24/25	

=== Vessels scheduled to retire ===
BC Ferries has plans to retire the Queen of New Westminster as well as the five C-class vessels, starting in 2029. These will be replaced by up to seven Summit class ships.

On May 26, 2025, BC Ferries announced that Quinsam will be retired upon the introduction of Island-class two-vessel service on the Crofton-Vesuvius route, in 2027.

== Future vessels ==
In 2019, BC started a $200 million program to acquire four hybrid/electric ferries (800 kWh each) to service three routes. As for the remaining seven vessels within the 12-year capital plan, they will all be large ships, which will replace six aging ships and provide one additional vessel to support growth and improve resiliency. Marshall says the first of these new large ships will enter service in 2029.

Photo	Name	Class	Year built (Rebuilt)	Auto capacity	Passenger capacity	Notes	Route(s)
The remaining two ships will be identical to the existing Island-class vessels (see above).	MV Island Gwa̲’ya̲m; MV Island K’asa	Island	2024–present	47	400	Four BC-built ships which are hybrid electric-powered, with the ability to convert to full-electric propulsion, once shore-based charging technology is available for implementation. These vessels are expected to serve routes connecting Vancouver Island to Saltspring Island, Denman Island to Hornby Island, as well as Quadra Island to Cortes Island. On November 25, 2025, the four vessels were gifted their names: The first two vessels were named by the Snuneymuxw First Nation, and the latter two were named by the We Wai Kai and Wei Wai Kum First Nations. The announcement also clarified that the first two vessels are destined for Route 23, and the latter two for route 19.	23
	MV Summit Arbutus; MV Summit Cedar; MV Summit Maple; MV Summit Spruce; 3 vessels additional which remain unnamed.	Summit	2025–TBD	~ 360	~ 2,100	The Summit class, introduced on February 26, 2024, will consist of at least seven double-ended ships. As with the Island class vessels, the New Major Vessels will be hybrid electric-powered, with the ability to convert to full-electric propulsion, once shore-based charging technology is available for implementation. These vessels are expected to serve the three major routes connecting Vancouver Island and the lower mainland, and would allow for the retirement of Queen of New Westminster, as well as the five C-class vessels. The ships were designed in collaboration with LMG Marin, a Norwegian engineering services company. BC Ferries commenced the bidding process to find a shipyard to build the vessels, in November 2023. On June 10, 2025, BC Ferries announced that they had partnered with China Merchants Industry Weihei Shipyards to build the first four vessels. On May 27, 2026, BC Ferries announced that the first four New Major Vessels will make up the Summit Class and be named after trees found across BC.	1, 2, 3, & 30; 1 relief vessel

== See also ==
- List of inland ferries in British Columbia
- List of BC Ferries accidents and incidents
- List of Washington State Ferries ships
- List of Alaska Marine Highway ships
