= List of unclassed ships of BC Ferries =

A number of ships operated by BC Ferries are not classed. They are either purchased second hand from other operators, are customized vessels with no class assigned by the builders, or are small passenger only vessels owned by sub-contractors.

- MV Centurion VII - Owned and operated by Pacific Western Marine, under the sponsorship of BC Ferries, and out of Western Pacific Marine's French Creek Terminal - 1985, In Service
- MV Cy Peck - 1961, Retired 1966
- MV Dogwood Princess - 1969, Retired 1979
- MV Dogwood Princess II - 1979, Retired 2003
- MV George S. Pearson - 1961, Retired 1966
- MV Howe Sound Queen - 1964, Retired 2019
- MV Jervis Queen - 1961, Retired 1966
- MV Langdale Queen - 1961, Retired 1976
- MV Mill Bay - 1969, Retired 2011
- MV Northern Adventure - 2004, In Service
- MV Northern Expedition - 2009, In Service
- MV North Island Princess - 1958, Retired 2020
- MV Pender Queen - 1961, Retired 1980
- MV Queen of Chilliwack - 1991, Retired 2015
- MV Queen of Prince Rupert - 1965, Retired 2009
- MV Queen of the Islands - 1963, Retired 1991
- MV Queen of the North - 1974, Sank 2006
- MV Quillayute - 1961, Retired 1963
- MV Tenaka - 1964, Retired 2016
- MV Saltspring Queen - 1961, Retired 1996
- MV Sechelt Queen - 1961, Retired 1976
- SS Smokwa - 1961, Retired 1966
- MV Stormaway III - Owned and operated by Kona Winds Yacht Charters Limited, but under the sponsorship of and out of the Langdale terminal of BC Ferries - 2003, In Service
- MV Stormaway IV - Owned and operated by Kona Winds Yacht Charters Limited, but under the sponsorship of and out of the Langdale terminal of BC Ferries - 2003, In Service
- MV Sunshine Coast Queen - 1967, Retired 1976
- MV Vesuvius Queen - 1962, Retired 1998

== See also ==
- List of retired BC Ferries ships
