= T-class ferry =

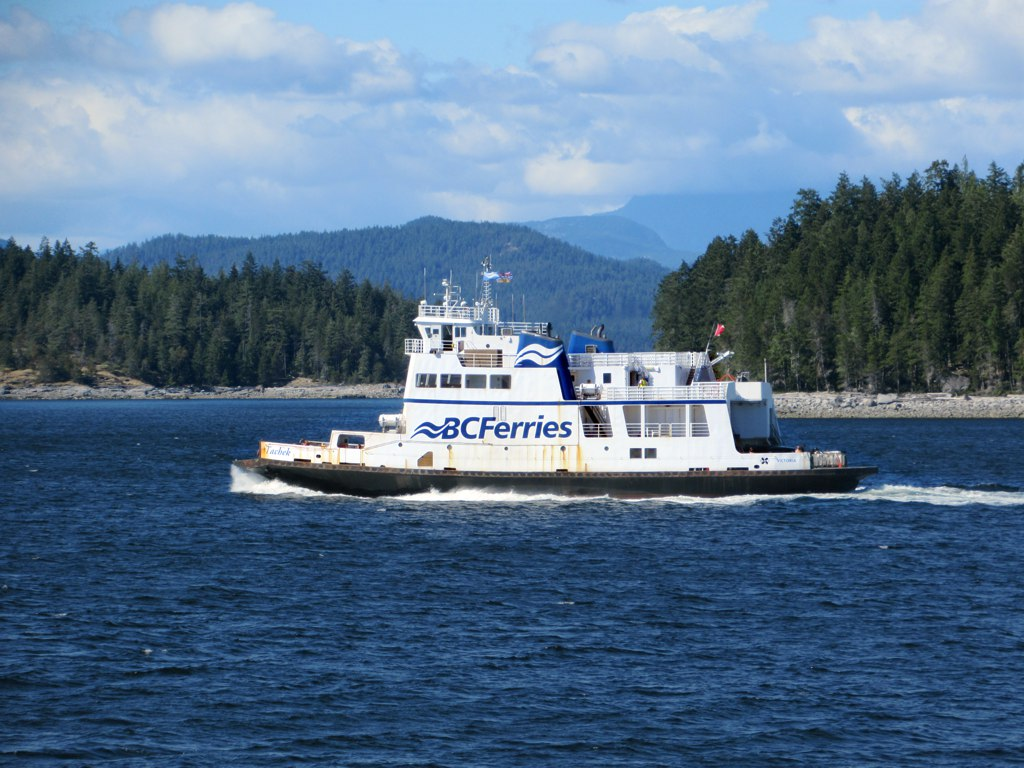
- Tachek sailing the Discovery Passage

Class overview
- Name: T class
- Builders: Allied Shipbuilders
- Operators: British Columbia Ministry of Transportation (1969–1985); BC Ferries (1985–)
- Built: 1969
- Completed: 2
- Retired: 2

General characteristics MV Tachek
- Tonnage: 797.0 GT
- Displacement: 807 tonnes
- Length: 49.53 m (162 ft 6 in)
- Beam: 14.63 m (48 ft 0 in)
- Installed power: 1,700 hp (1,300 kW)
- Speed: 11 knots (20 km/h; 13 mph)
- Capacity: 30 vehicles; 143 passengers
- Crew: 7
- Notes: Retired on June 26, 2026

General characteristics MV Quadra Queen II
- Tonnage: 865.32 GT
- Displacement: 819 tonnes
- Length: 49.61 m (162 ft 9 in)
- Beam: 14.63 m (48 ft 0 in)
- Installed power: 1,700 hp (1,300 kW)
- Speed: 11 knots (20 km/h; 13 mph)
- Capacity: 30 vehicles; 143 passengers
- Crew: 7
- Notes: Retired as of August 7, 2026.

The T-class ferry is a class of ships formerly operated by BC Ferries, for use on small inter-island routes. The two vessels had raised bows, which made it easier for them to travel the rough seas often found off the central coast of British Columbia. The two ferries, built in 1969, carried 30 cars and 150 passengers and were originally owned and operated by the British Columbia Ministry of Transportation until 1985, when the Ministry's saltwater ferry and routes and vessels were transferred to BC Ferries. The two T-class ferries were called Quadra Queen II and Tachek.

== Ships in class ==
MV Quadra Queen II was built in 1969, also by Allied Shipbuilders in Vancouver, British Columbia. She replaced the original Quadra Queen on the Campbell River–Quathiaski Cove (Quadra Island) route. Quadra Queen was renamed Cortes Queen and later MV Nicola. In the late-1980s or early-1990s, Quadra Queen II was relocated to the Port McNeill-Alert Bay-Sointula route. From April 2010 to May 2011, Quadra Queen II underwent a CA$15 million life extension project meant to prepare the vessel for another 20 years of service. On June 18, 2020, Quadra Queen II was relegated to serving as an auxiliary vessel on the Buckley Bay-Denman Island route during the trial period of the new MV Island Aurora, and was unofficially retired after the Island Aurora replaced her fulltime on her original route. On October 13, 2025, Quadra Queen II was brought back into service to cover the Port McNeill-Alert Bay-Sointula triangle route while the Island Aurora was relocated to cover the Campbell River-Quadra Island and Nanaimo Harbour-Gabriola Island routes during BC Ferries' annual refit season. While announcing these moves, BC Ferries also stated that Quadra Queen II would once again be retired following her farewell run on March 17, 2026, though no formal announcement was ever made. On August 7, 2026, however, BC Ferries issued a Request for Expression of Interest (RFEOI) on BC Bid, via the Chamber of Shipping, in order to gauge market interest in the possible purchase of the Quadra Queen II, indicating that she has been formally retired and will be sold.

MV Tachek was built in 1969 in Vancouver, British Columbia by Allied Shipbuilders. She was originally named Texada Queen and was used on the Powell River-Blubber Bay route, serving her namesake Texada Island. She was renamed Tachek in 1977, and continued serving Texada Island until 1979 when the larger North Island Princess replaced her. Since then, she has served as an auxiliary vessel, providing additional capacity where demand is needed and serving as a backup ferry when other ferries are out of service. On 15 December 2012, Tachek was removed from service to undergo a nine-month life-extension project. In 2016, she took over the Heriot Bay-Whaletown route from Tenaka, upon her retirement. Tachek went on to serve this route for next ten years, until she was retired upon completion of her final sailing from Whaletown to Heriot Bay, late in the morning of June 26, 2026. On August 7, 2026, BC Ferries issued a Request for Expression of Interest (RFEOI) on BC Bid, via the Chamber of Shipping, in order to gauge market interest in the possible purchase of the Tachek, indicating that she will be sold.
