= Tenaka =

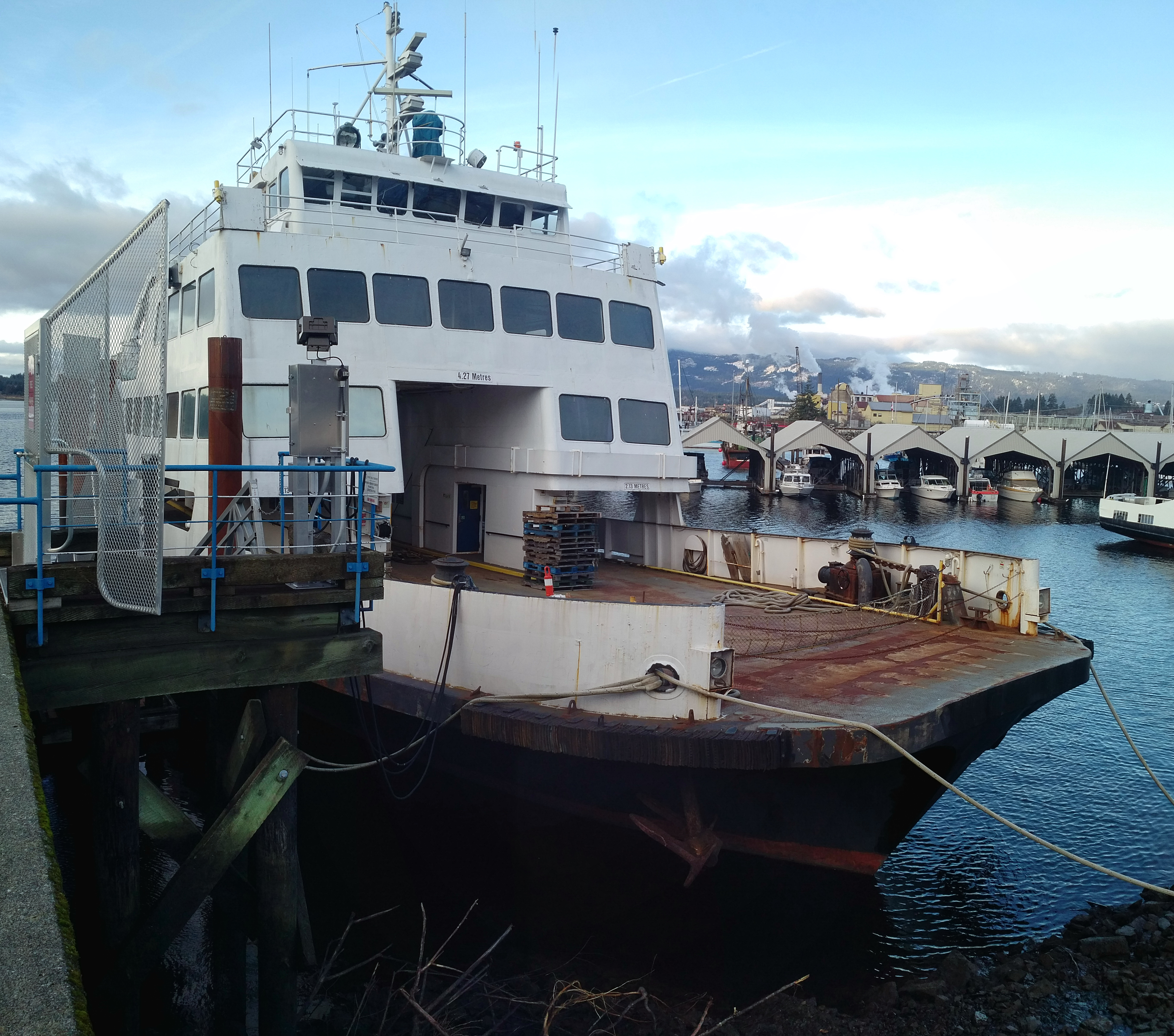
- Alberni Legacy docked in Port Alberni

History

Canada
- Name: Comox Queen
- Namesake: Comox, British Columbia
- Owner: Ministry of Transportation and Highways
- Operator: Ministry of Transportation and Highways
- Route: 1964-1976: Powell River-Comox; 1979-?: Port McNeill - Sointula - Alert Bay
- Builder: Victoria Machinery Depot
- Completed: 1964
- Renamed: Tenaka, 1977
- Fate: Transferred to BC Ferries in 1985

Canada
- Name: Tenaka
- Owner: British Columbia Ferry Services Inc.
- Operator: British Columbia Ferry Services Inc.
- Route: 1994-2014: Heriot Bay (Quadra Island) - Whaletown (Cortes Island)
- Acquired: 1985
- Identification: IMO number: 6501850; MMSI number: 316001272; Callsign: CY7449
- Fate: Sold to Lady Rose Marine Services in April 2016

General characteristics
- Class & type: unclassified
- Type: ferry
- Tonnage: 651
- Displacement: 618 tonnes
- Length: 47.09 m (154.5 ft)
- Beam: 13.29 m (43.6 ft)
- Installed power: 1,642 hp (1,224 kW)
- Speed: 12 knots (22 km/h)
- Capacity: 150 passengers and crew; 30 cars

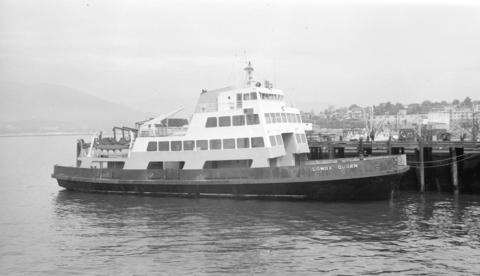
Comox Queen docked in Vancouver, BC on June 1, 1969

Tenaka is a ferry previously owned by BC Ferries. She was built for BC's Ministry of Transportation and Highways in 1964 in Victoria, British Columbia by the Victoria Machinery Depot. Originally named the Comox Queen, she was renamed Tenaka in 1977 and became part of BC Ferries' fleet in 1985 when the Ministry of Transportation's saltwater ferries and routes were transferred to BC Ferries. As of April 2016, the Tenaka was sold to Lady Rose Marine Services, a tourism company operating out of Port Alberni, British Columbia.

The Tenaka is a single ended ferry that carries 30 cars and 150 passengers. Two Caterpillar engines provide 1700 horsepower and give the Tenaka a speed of 12 knots. There are two passenger deck levels on the ferry. There are two lounges on the lower passenger level that are on each side of the overheight car lane. Another passenger lounge directly above extends across the width of the ferry. The Tenaka has a vending machine and washrooms, but no other passenger amenities. It has two outside decks astern of each passenger cabin.

The Comox Queen, as she was originally called, was built for the Powell River-Comox route, and it began service there on March 25, 1965. Traffic on that route soon outgrew the Comox Queen, and from 1969 to 1976, the Ministry borrowed BC Ferries' Queen of the Islands in the summer for use on the route. In 1976, the Comox Queen was replaced with the much-larger Sechelt Queen. The Comox Queen received new engines and was renamed the Tenaka in 1977. In 1979, she was assigned to the Port McNeill–Sointula–Alert Bay route, replacing the MV Nimpkish.

In 1985, the Ministry's coastal routes and ferries were transferred to BC Ferries, including the Tenaka. Over the next few years, she served on a variety of routes for BC Ferries. In 1994, she started working on the Heriot Bay–Whaletown route between Quadra Island and Cortes Island. She again replaced the Nimpkish that was formerly working on this route. As of December 2014, Tenaka sailed its last voyage across the Strait of Georgia.

On April 12, 2016, BC Ferries was planning to auction off 3 of their vessels. The first vessel to be sold was the Tenaka, whose auction was won by a tourism company called Lady Rose Marine Services that operates out of Port Alberni. The ship was subsequently renamed Alberni Legacy.
