= Salish =

Salish (/ˈseɪlɪʃ/) may refer to:

- Salish peoples, a group of First Nations/Native Americans
  - Coast Salish peoples, several First Nations/Native American groups in the coastal regions of the Pacific Northwest
  - Interior Salish peoples, several First Nations/Native American groups in the inland regions of the Northwest Plateau
- Salishan languages, a group of languages
  - Coast Salish languages
  - Interior Salish languages
- Bitterroot Salish
- The Salish–Spokane–Kalispel language
- The Salish Wool Dog bred by the Salish peoples
- NATO reporting name for the FKR-1

== People ==
- Salish Matter (born 2009), American content creator mostly known on YouTube

== Places ==
- Salish Sea, an inland sea consisting of Puget Sound, the Strait of Juan de Fuca and the Strait of Georgia
- Salish Mountains, a mountain range in Montana
- Salishan, Tacoma, Washington, a neighborhood of Tacoma

== In fiction ==
- the Salish, a people featured in the episode "Spirits" of the television series Stargate SG-1
- Salish, a character in the episode "The Paradise Syndrome" of the television series Star Trek
- Anna Delaney, a character in the BBC drama Taboo (2017 TV series), who is referred to as a person of Salish heritage.

== In transportation ==
- The Salish class of ferries operated by BC Ferries

== See also ==
- Coast Salish art
- Confederated Salish and Kootenai Tribes
