= Kahloke =

Kahloke can refer to:

- SS Asbury Park, later renamed Kahloke
- MV Kahloke, the current ship with that name
