= K-class ferry =

K-class ferry may refer to:

- Sydney K-class ferry
- British Columbia K-class ferry
