= Victoria Machinery Depot =

Canadian shipyard and heavy equipment manufacturer

- Industry: Shipbuilding, Energy, Industry
- Predecessor: Albion Iron Works, Spratt and Kriemler, Harbour Marine Company
- Founded: May 4, 1863
- Founder: Joseph Spratt
- Defunct: May 1994
- Fate: Dissolved
- Headquarters: Victoria, British Columbia, Canada
- Key people: Johann Kriemler Co-founder
- Products: Ferries, Naval vessels, Oil platforms, Boilers, Ammonia production equipment, Manhole covers, Wood-burning stoves (starting in 1878)

Victoria Machinery Depot Ltd. was a historic metalworks and shipyard in Victoria, Canada.

== Establishment ==
From the late 1850s, with the Fraser Canyon and Cariboo Gold Rushes, British Columbia was dependent upon Californian supplies and ships. To prevent US domination of the colony, Governor James Douglas enacted laws restricting US shipping. As a consequence, Joseph Spratt established the Albion Iron Works on May 4, 1863.

== Restructured operations ==
Albion Iron Works went through several business changes and merged with Victoria Machinery Depot (VMD), assuming the latter's name in 1888. After a fire in 1908 destroyed the plant, the facility was rebuilt. The yard did essential war work in both world wars. Harold Husband purchased the company in 1947 for $185,000.

A 1954 fire caused $100,000 damage to the storage shed on Dallas road. Later, the yard built several BC Ferries vessels.

During 1965–1967, it constructed the oil drilling platform Sedco 135-F for exploration by Shell Canada in Hecate Strait. At the time, Sedco 135-F was the largest semi-submersible platform in the world and was the first platform constructed in BC. Before submersion, the CA$10 million rig rose 50 metres (160 ft) above the waterline at the VMD docks. After the 1967 launch and three years of exploration off the British Columbia coast, it was towed to oilfields in New Zealand, the North Sea, and the Gulf of Mexico. Sedco 135-F is often confused with the rig that suffered the blowout resulting in the Ixtoc I oil spill. That was the original Sedco 135, the first of the series built at Ingalls Shipbuilding in 1965. Sedco 135-F was one of the last seagoing vessels built by VMD.

The company turned to pressure vessels and submarines, but the firm closed permanently in 1994, joining the business contractions of that decade.

The yards were one of several contractors to the Royal Canadian Navy for ship repair and maintenance.

== Facilities ==
The first shipyard was constructed on Bay Street between Pleasant Street and Turner Street. A second yard was built near what is now Ogden Point Terminal.

== Ships built ==
=== Miscellaneous vessels ===
- Hull 6 SS Mount Royal – 1902, built for the Hudson's Bay Company.
- Hull 136 Sedco 135-F – 1967, at 8,676 gross register tonnage it was one of the largest vessels built by VMD.

=== Warships ===
- Hull 58 HMCS Terra Nova (DDE 259) – 1959 Restigouche-class destroyer
- Hull 87 HMCS Saskatchewan (DDE 262) – 1959–1961 Mackenzie-class destroyer moved to Yarrows Shipyards for completion in September 1961.

=== Ferries ===
- Hull 52 MV Lloyd Jones – 1950, later known as Vesuvius Queen. (see also Steamboats of Lake Okanagan)
- Hull 79 MV Mill Bay – 1956 built for Coast Ferries Ltd., purchased by BC Ferries in 1969.
- Hull 85 MV Sidney – 1960, later Queen Of Sidney – 1963.
- Hull 94 MV City of Victoria – 1962, later Queen of Victoria 1963, Queen of Ocoa 2000, Aan 2005, scrapped 2006.
- Hull 99 Queen of Saanich – 1963
- Hull 100 MV Queen of Esquimalt – 1963
- Hull 104 Queen of Nanaimo – 1964

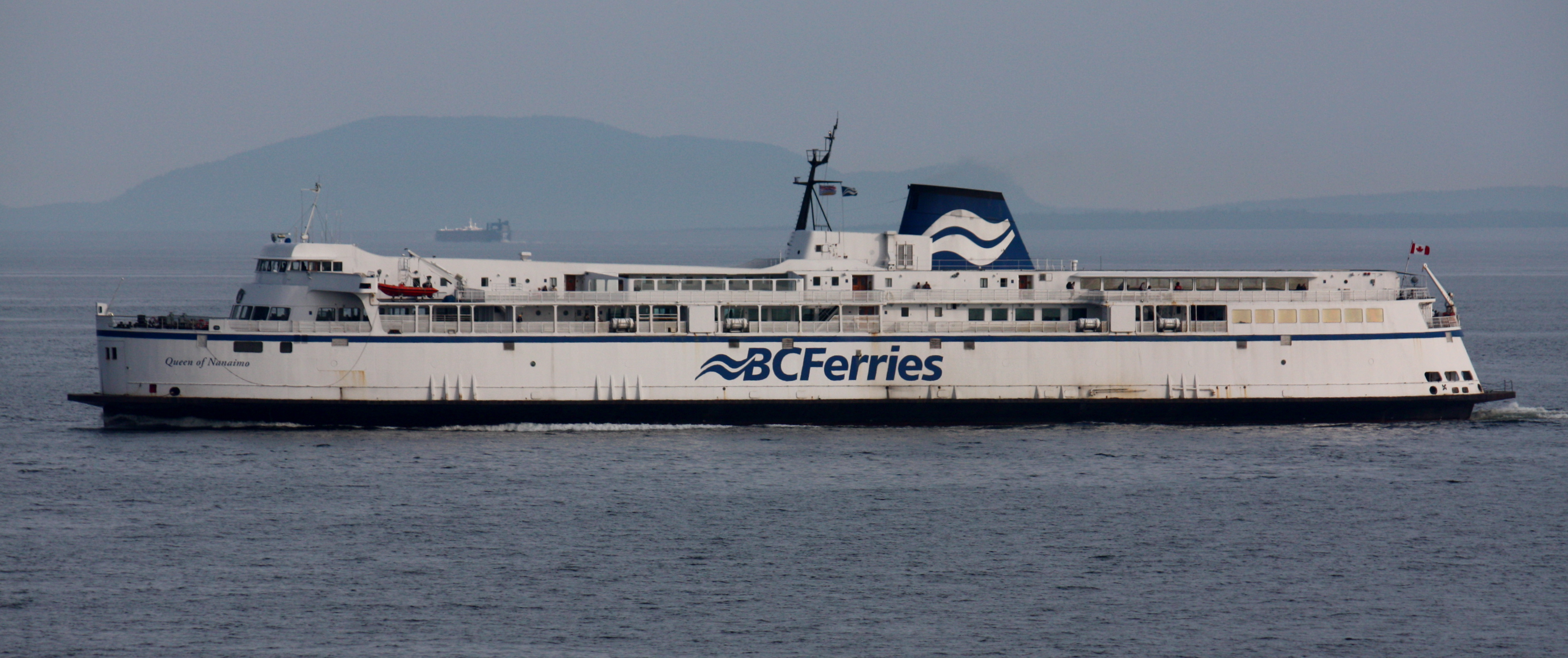
Queen of Nanaimo

- Hull 105 Queen of New Westminster – 1964
- Hull 107 MV Comox Queen – 1964 built for the Ministry of Transportation, later Tenaka.
- Hull 125 MV Queen of Burnaby – 1965
- Hull 129 MV Powell River Queen – 1965
- Hull 130 MV Mayne Queen – 1965
- Hull 131 MV Bowen Queen – 1965
- Hull 124 Queen of Prince Rupert – 1966
- Hull 145 MV Doris Yorke – 1968, now Seaspan Doris (a truck and rail ferry), was the last vessel constructed by VMD.
- Sternwheeler Inlander - 1910. She was the last sternwheeler serving the Skeena River. Scrapped in 1912 at Port Essington.

=== Sternwheelers ===
- Inlander - 1910. She was the last sternwheeler serving the Skeena River. Scrapped in 1912 at Port Essington.
- Hull 6 SS Mount Royal – 1902, built for the Hudson's Bay Company.

== See also ==
- List of oil spills
- Transocean – recent company that owns part of the remnants of the former South East Drilling Company (SEDCO)
