= Salish-class ferry =

Class of double-ended ferries in British Columbia, Canada

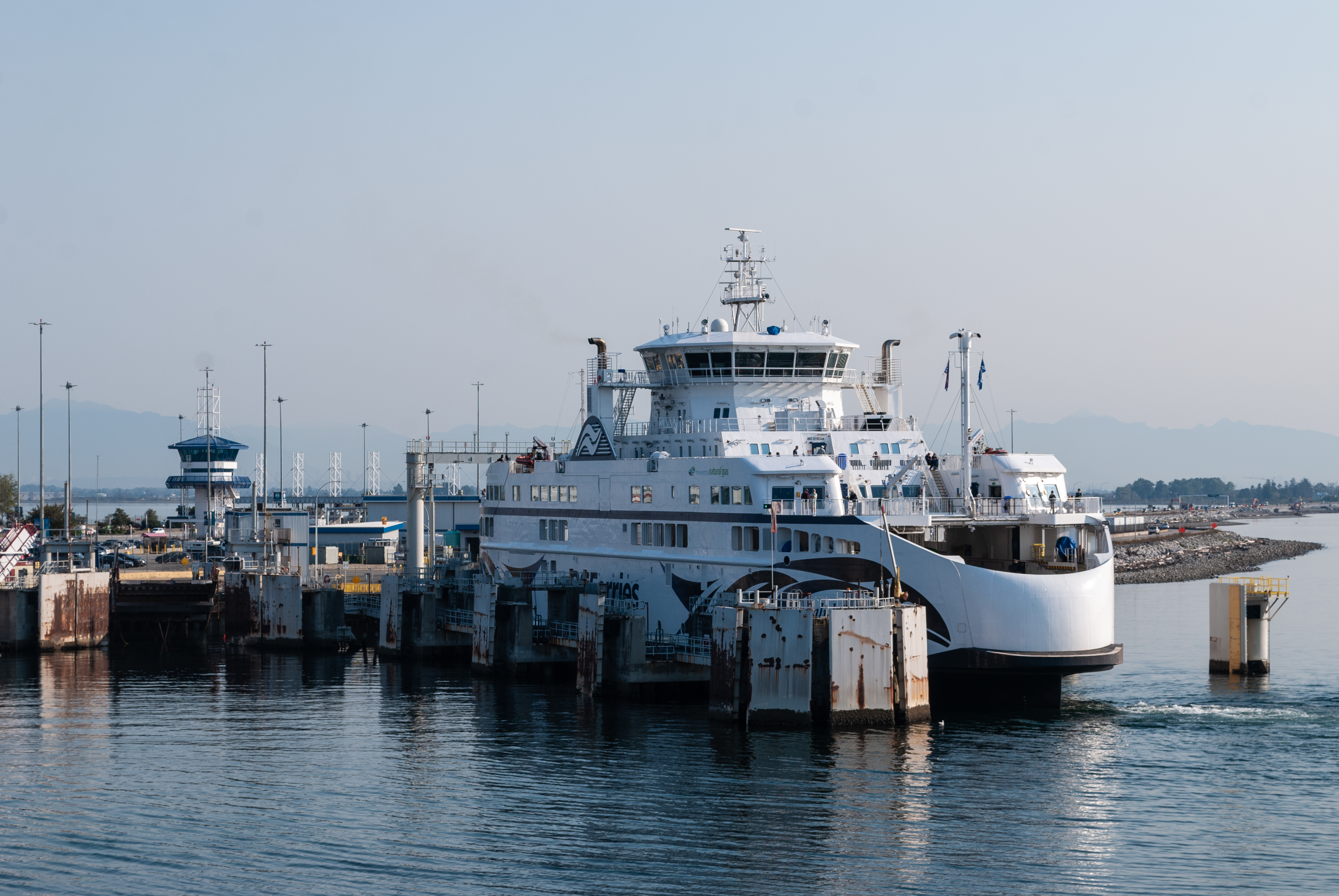
- Salish Raven docked at Tsawwassen Ferry Terminal in 2018

Class overview
- Name: Salish class
- Builders: Remontowa Shipbuilding S.A., Gdańsk, Poland
- Operators: BC Ferries
- Preceded by: Burnaby class
- Built: 2016, 2020
- In service: 2017–present
- Planned: 4
- Completed: 4
- Active: 4

General characteristics
- Type: Ferry
- Tonnage: 8,728 GT; 864 DWT
- Displacement: 4,227 long tons (4,295 t)
- Length: 107.2 m (351 ft 8 in) oa
- Beam: 23.5 m (77 ft 1 in)
- Installed power: 5,952 hp (4,438 kW)
- Speed: 15.5 knots (28.7 km/h; 17.8 mph)
- Capacity: 600 passengers and crew; 138 vehicles

The Salish-class vessels are four intermediate-capacity ferries operated by BC Ferries and were built in 2016 at Remontowa Shipbuilding S.A. in Gdańsk, Poland. They were the first dual-fuel powered vessels in British Columbia service, capable of using liquified natural gas or diesel oil to operate. Salish Orca entered service on the Comox–Powell River route in May 2017. Salish Eagle entered service on the Tsawwassen–Southern Gulf Islands route in June 2017. Salish Raven entered service for the Southern Gulf Islands on August 3, 2017. These vessels replaced Queen of Nanaimo, Queen of Burnaby and Mayne Queen.

== Description ==
The four Salish-class vessels, Salish Eagle, Salish Orca, Salish Raven and Salish Heron, have a displacement of 4,227 long tons (4,295 t) and all measure 8,728 gross tonnage (GT) and max 864 tons deadweight (DWT). Salish-class vessels are 107.2 metres (351 ft 8 in) long overall and 100.69 metres (330 ft 4 in) between perpendiculars. The ferries have a beam of 23.5 metres (77 ft 1 in). They are powered by dual-fuel engines capable of using liquified natural gas (LNG) or diesel fuel to operate. The engines are rated at 5,952 horsepower (4,438 kW). They were the first vessels in British Columbia to be powered by LNG. They have a maximum speed of 15.5 knots (28.7 km/h; 17.8 mph). Each ship has two car decks. They have capacity for 600 passengers and crew and 138 vehicles measuring 6.1 by 2.6 metres (20.0 ft × 8.5 ft). The ferries have several amenities aboard including a cafeteria, a gift shop and areas for children and pets.

== Vessels ==
Salish class
Name	Year built	Route(s)	Status	Picture
Salish Eagle	2017	9 (Southern Gulf Islands)	Active	
Salish Orca	2016	17 (Comox–Powell River)	Active	
Salish Raven	2017	5 (Southern Gulf Islands)	Active	
Salish Heron	2020	9A (Tsawwassen–Outer Gulf Islands)/refit relief for routes 5/5A during off season	Active	

== Construction and career ==
Constructed by Remontowa Shipbuilding S.A. in Gdańsk, Poland, the three original vessels of the Salish class were ordered as replacements for the older MV Queen of Burnaby, Mayne Queen, and Queen of Nanaimo. Salish Orca was the first completed, in November 2016, and entered service on May 15, 2017. Salish Eagle was completed in February 2017 and entered service that June. Salish Raven was completed in April 2017 and entered service ahead of schedule on August 3, 2017, after Queen of Nanaimo had significant mechanical issues preventing the ship from continued service. Salish Raven sails on the Swartz Bay – Southern Gulf Islands Route 5, Salish Eagle sail on the Southern Gulf Islands – Tsawwassen route 9, Salish Orca sails on the Powell River – Comox route 17 and Salish Heron sails on Tsawwassen – Southern Gulf Islands route 9a in the busy season and acts as a relief vessel for the other Salish-class ships during their refit and out of service periods.

On November 1, 2019, Remontowa Shipbuilding signed a contract with BC Ferries to build the fourth Salish-class vessel, intended to replace Mayne Queen on the Swartz Bay–Outer Gulf Island run (route 5A). Construction for the fourth Salish-class vessel began on February 4, 2020. The ship was planned to complete sea trials in 2021 before arriving in British Columbia to be outfitted and ultimately enter service in 2022. On March 23, 2021, BC Ferries announced that the name for the fourth Salish-class vessel would be Salish Heron. Salish Heron started its journey to British Columbia on December 22, 2021, from Gdańsk bound for Victoria. The journey also included a stopover at Manzanillo in Mexico. The ship finally arrived at Victoria on March 3, 2022. The vessel entered service on May 6, 2022, after having its artwork painted to its hull.

Shortly after entering service, the Salish-class vessels experienced several problems; the first was that there was no galley ventilation system and at times the cafeteria's kitchen would reach extreme temperatures, making it unsafe for crews to work in the kitchen. In early 2018, all three active Salish-class vessels had a galley ventilation system installed, fixing the issue. The ships' elevators and issues with refueling were problems; both issues were resolved when the ships were sent to local shipyards for repairs.

On November 7, 2019, Salish Raven suffered a malfunction in one of its propellers at roughly 9:30 am after leaving Pender Island. A tugboat arrived to aid the ferry and all its passengers were disembarked by 1:30 pm. The vessel resumed sailing later that day.

On August 12, 2025, Salish Heron suffered an uncontrolled anchor release, resulting in a small fire and a significant delay. The vessel proceeded along its route with its remaining working anchor.
