= Heriot Bay, British Columbia =

Coordinates: 50.100°N 125.208°W

Location of Heriot Bay in British Columbia

Heriot Bay is the principal settlement on Quadra Island in British Columbia, Canada.

Heriot Bay hosts a ferry terminal that is used by BC Ferries to sail to and from Whaletown on Cortes Island. There is also a government dock, maintained by the Quadra Island Harbour Authority, and the marina at the Heriot Bay Inn.

It was named for F.L.M. Heriot a relative of Rear-Admiral Sir Thomas Maitland who commanded the Pacific Station from 1860 to 1862.
