= PacifiCat-class ferry =

Failed fast-ferry class operated by BC Ferries

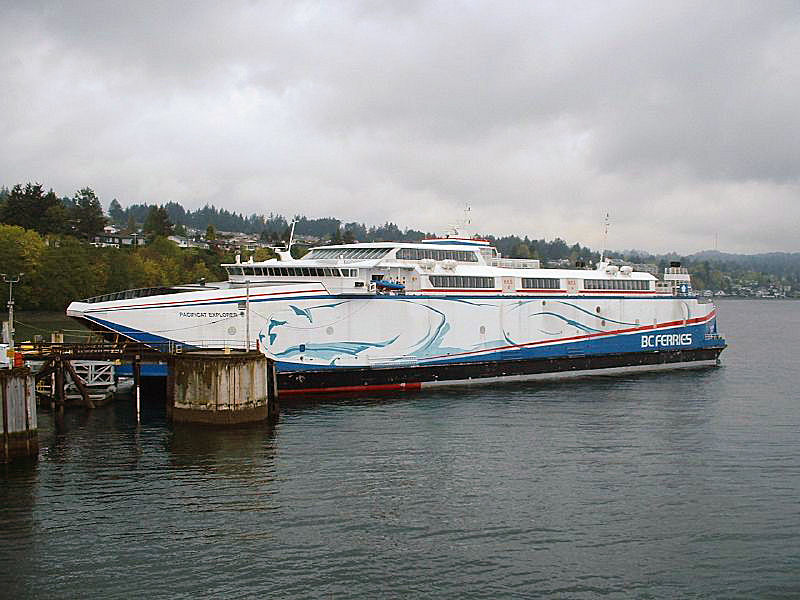
- PacifiCat Explorer, the first of the class at Departure Bay in Nanaimo

Class overview
- Name: PacifiCat
- Builders: Catamaran Ferries International, North Vancouver
- Operators: BC Ferries
- Preceded by: Victoria class, Cowichan class
- Succeeded by: Coastal class
- Cost: CA$463 million (2000) (equivalent to CA$797 million in 2025) for 3 vessels; CA$154.3 million (2000) (equivalent to CA$265.6 million in 2025) per unit
- Built: 1996–2000
- In service: 1999–2000
- Planned: 3
- Completed: 3
- Retired: 3

General characteristics
- Type: High-speed passenger ferry
- Tonnage: 9,022 GT
- Displacement: 1,885 tonnes
- Length: 122.5 m (401.9 ft)
- Beam: 25.8 m (84.6 ft)
- Draught: 3.76 m (12.3 ft)
- Propulsion: 4 MTU 20V1163 TB3 diesel engines, 6,500 kW (8,717 hp) each; 4 Kamewa 112 SII water jets
- Speed: 34 knots (63 km/h; 39 mph); 45 knots (83 km/h; 52 mph) (unladen record)
- Capacity: 1,000 passengers and crew; 250 vehicles

The PacifiCat class of fast ferries was operated from June 1999 to March 2000 by BC Ferries in British Columbia, Canada. Three PacifiCat catamarans; Explorer, Discovery, and Voyager were built between 1996 and 2000 as part of a project to improve ferry service between the Lower Mainland and Vancouver Island. The first two catamarans were briefly used for revenue service between Horseshoe Bay in West Vancouver and Departure Bay in Nanaimo from 1999 to March 2000. The third catamaran, PacifiCat Voyager, was completed in early 2000 but had yet to enter revenue service by the time the project was cancelled.

The PacifiCat project started in June 1994 with an estimated total cost of $210 million. By the time the ships were finished, the total cost had ballooned to $463 million. A 1999 report by the Auditor General of British Columbia concluded that the fast ferry project had been beset by significant breakdowns in both governance and risk management.

== History ==
=== Background ===
Car ferry service on the route between Horseshoe Bay, West Vancouver and Departure Bay, Nanaimo had originally been started by the private Black Ball Line in June 1953. Black Ball was purchased by the government of British Columbia on November 30, 1961 and its routes absorbed into the BC Ferries system.

Both the Horseshoe Bay and Departure Bay ferry terminals are located within residential areas. Departure Bay terminal is located at Vancouver Island's northern tip of their part of the Trans-Canada Highway (Nanaimo). Horseshoe Bay is the mainland connection to the Trans-Canada Highway freeway. In addition, the Horseshoe Bay terminal is located in a very small cove next to a commercial marina and there have been several collisions between pleasure craft and ferries over the years.

The provincial government was aware of these issues as early as 1972, when a Ministry of Highways report recommended developing a new ferry route between Iona Island south of Vancouver and Gabriola Island south of Nanaimo. Another report recommending the same solution was produced in 1988. This proposed route is 22 kilometres shorter than the current route and would have also eliminated the problems with ferry terminal traffic. Ultimately, the government did build a new ferry terminal for Nanaimo: Duke Point, which opened in 1997 and which serves as terminus for the ferry route from Tsawwassen. Duke Point was intended to divert truck traffic away from the Horsesehoe Bay-Departure Bay route. This situation was the starting point from which the fast ferry project developed.

=== The project ===
In 1992, BC Ferries and the government began reviewing the issue of ferry service to Nanaimo. The final report, completed in January 1994, neither supported nor endorsed the use of fast ferries for service between Horseshoe Bay and Departure Bay. At a meeting in February 1994 that involved the minister responsible for BC Ferries, the corporation's management indicated that using fast ferries required "further extensive analysis." Their advice was ignored, and less than two months later the minister responsible, Glen Clark, ordered the ferry corporation to cede control over its long-term planning to the government. After the government finished drafting the plan, Clark pressed the BC Ferries board for a quick approval, and the Auditor-General's report about the fast ferries partly blames him for rushing the fast ferries into production.

The result was a ten-year capital plan which had been crafted by the government. It bypassed leasing a fast ferry for trials in BC waters and went directly to implementation. Several other projects previously considered essential, such as replacing one of the northern ferries, were deferred in favour of the fast ferries. In addition, the construction of the fast ferries would be used to revitalise the province's shipbuilding industry, furthering policy goals beyond merely improving ferry service to Nanaimo. The BC Ferries board, which was required to rubberstamp the plan, noted several concerns about the fast ferry aspect when asking the cabinet to give it final approval.

A public announcement of the fast ferry project was made in June 1994; it had been decided to immediately proceed with building three fast ferries. The government claimed the fast ferries would cost $210 million total, and Clark later insisted that this figure had included everything "right down to the toilet paper." The truth was that little actual analysis had been done: not even the type of ship (single hull or catamaran), nor their dimensions had even been determined when the $210 million figure was announced.

The government hoped that private shipyards would be able to build the ships on a fixed-cost basis. This turned out not to be the case; the shipbuilding industry was less enthusiastic than anticipated. Moreover, none of the shipyards being considered for the work had the facilities to build the fast ferries. BC Ferries had no choice but to do the work itself on a cost-plus basis. It would have to act as project manager and assume the risk of the fast ferries. Catamaran Ferries International (CFI), a wholly owned subsidiary of BC Ferries, was incorporated in March 1996 to carry out the work and construction started later that year.

The CFI board was suddenly replaced a year later with a new one whose members were either part of CFI management, had significant business ties to the company, or already served on BC Ferries board. According to the Auditor-General's report, this is a textbook example of poor corporate governance. It "created the awkward accountability relationship of having board members account to themselves for their performance."

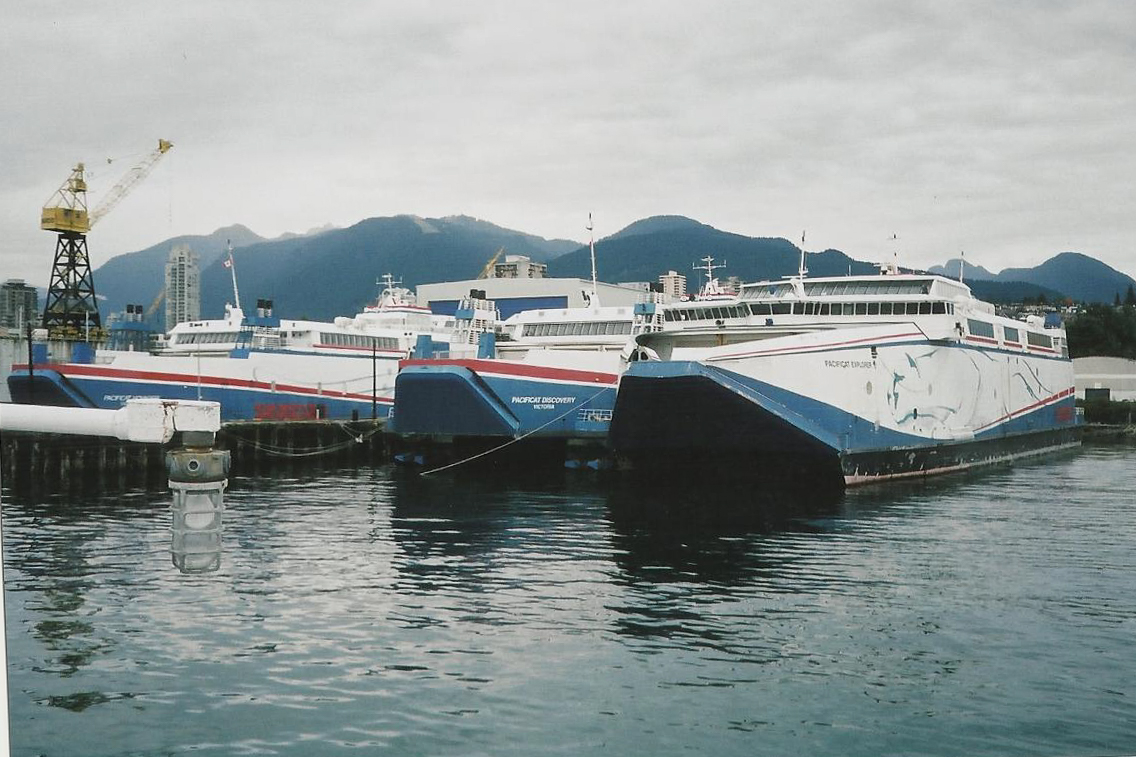
All three PacifiCats docked at North Vancouver in October 2005

=== Fate of the PacifiCats ===
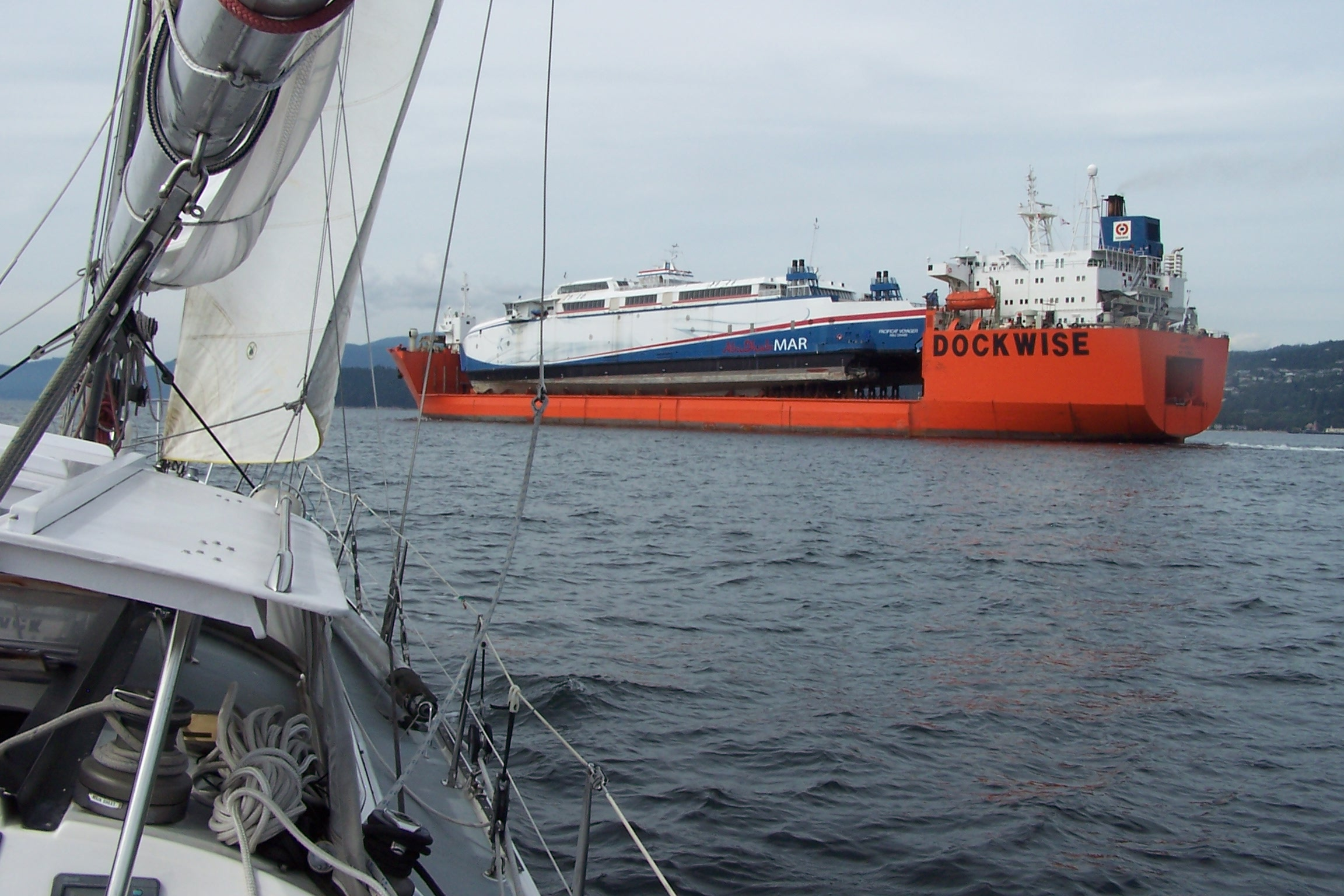
Pacificat Voyager on a heavy-lift ship towards Abu Dhabi in 2009

On March 1, 2000, Joy MacPhail, then the minister responsible for BC Ferries, recommended to the government that it abandon the PacifiCat project, calling it "a failed experiment." Her colleagues agreed, and the ships were put up for sale at an asking price of $120 million for all three. They turned out to be difficult to sell, due to their highly specialised design and a saturated market.

After a change of government in May 2001, and more attempts to sell at a higher price, the ships were finally put up for auction in March 2003 and were sold to the Washington Marine Group for US$13 million (CA$19.23 million), 4.2% of what it cost to build them. Washington Marine Group announced on July 28, 2009 that they had sold the three ships for an undisclosed amount to Abu Dhabi MAR, a luxury yacht builder.

The ferries were observed to be tied up in Alexandria Port, Egypt in late 2022. The Egyptian government plans to scrap the vessels.

In late 2026 all three PacifiCat vessels were being scrapped in Egypt at Abu Qir Bay and Edku.

== Vessel characteristics ==
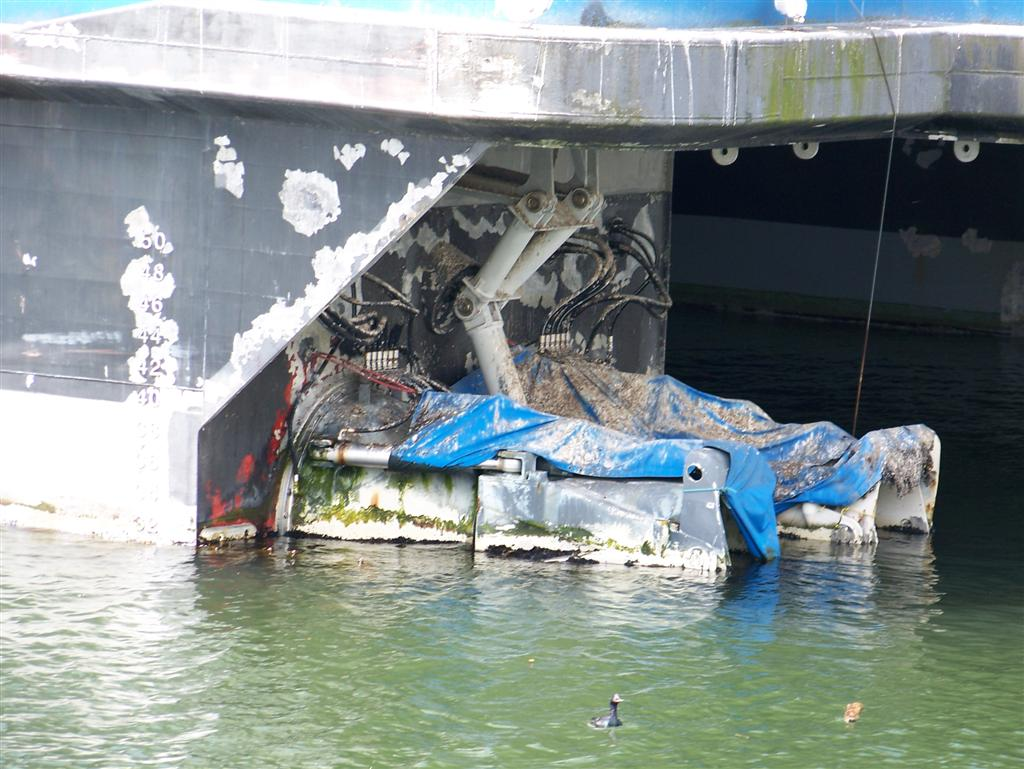
Waterjets of a PacifiCat

The PacifiCats were designed by Philip Hercus of Australia and Robert Allan Limited of Vancouver. Hercus developed the hull form and Robert Allan handled the outfitting aspects of the design. The PacifiCats were custom-designed to fit BC Ferries' docks, which allow simultaneous loading on two full-length roll-through vehicle decks. This trait gives the PacifiCats their unique appearance in comparison with other fast ferries.

Once the design was complete, CFI divided the construction work into over a hundred modules, built by a variety of BC companies. Completed modules were transported to CFI's facility in North Vancouver and assembled there. This was done both to stimulate the shipbuilding industry and to make it unnecessary to build a much larger facility for the PacifiCat construction.

The fast ferries were intended to achieve crossing times that were 30 minutes faster than those of conventional ferries, making twelve crossings per day rather than eight. Although they initially achieved this crossing time, complaints of the wash of the ships wake forced the ferries to take a longer route, and operate a slower speed around Bowen Island. An archived version of BC Ferries website stated in the year 2000 that a PacifiCat sailing was 1 hour 20 minutes, only 15 minutes shorter than a sailing with a regular vessel (1 hour 35 minutes).

Preceded by Spirit-class ferries	BC Ferries flagship 1999–2000	Succeeded by Spirit-class ferries
