= MV Motor Princess =

History
- Name: 1923-1955 MV Motor Princess, 1955-1980 Pender Queen
- Owner: Canadian Pacific
- Operator: 1923-1955: Canadian Pacific Railway, 1955-1961 Gulf Island Navigation, 1961-1980 BC Ferries
- Port of registry: (Canada)
- Builder: Yarrows Ltd., Esquimalt
- Launched: 31 March 1923
- Out of service: 1980
- Identification: IMO number: 5412959
- Fate: Scrapped

General characteristics
- Tonnage: 428 GT
- Length: 177 ft (54 m)
- Draught: 15 ft (4.6 m)
- Installed power: 1,050 horsepower
- Speed: 12 knots
- Capacity: 250 passengers and 40 cars

MV Motor Princess was a vehicle and passenger ferry built for Canadian Pacific in 1923. She was later renamed, Pender Queen then Pender Lady.

Motor Princess was built in 97 days at by Yarrows Ltd. in Esquimalt. She was built for the Canadian Pacific Railway Company's B.C. Coast Service.

Motor Princess had a main car deck as well as space for cars on the front half of the upper deck, connected to the main car deck with a ramp. She was a wooden-hulled vessel and the first diesel powered vessel in CP's fleet. She had a cruising speed of 14.5 knots. (Turner, 129) Robert Turner describes the passenger amenities in his book, "The Pacific Princesses":

Naturally, emphasis was on automobile facilities, but passengers were far from neglected. Though her lounge space was limited compared to the spacious equivalent quarters on the larger ships in the [CP] fleet, the Motor Princess was nonetheless well appointed. On both sides of the upper car deck, carpeted lounges were provided with large windows for viewing the scenic Gulf Islands. In addition, the after two-fifths of the upper deck were devoted to a combination dining room and social hall with hardwood flooring. Two staterooms were also provided on the compact ship, and ample open deck space was available for leisurely strolls and relaxing in the sun during the summer months. (129)

Turner cites the construction of the Motor Princess as being a turning point in ship construction for CP. From then on, almost all new ships would be more friendly towards transporting cars. (Turner, 129)

== Service ==
When first built, Motor Princess was placed on the Bellingham - Sidney route. She remained on this run for 3 years. (Kline and Bayless, 95; Turner, 129) CP moved Motor Princess north to operate between Vancouver and Nanaimo, in 1926. In 1929, she was placed on a route between Steveston (south of Vancouver) and Sidney (near Victoria).

In 1950, the CP was forced to remove Motor Princess from passenger service due to changed federal regulations regarding wooden vessels. For the next 5 years, she was used to carry freight between Vancouver and Victoria. (Turner, 193)

Motor Princess was sold to the Gulf Islands Ferry Company in 1955 who removed the wooden superstructure and replaced it with a steel one. The new ferry bore no resemblance to the old wooden freighter/ferry, she now had an open car deck and just a small upper deck for passengers/crew. She was then put into service in the Gulf Islands. (Turner, 193)

In 1961, Motor Princess joined B.C. Ferries with the rest of the Gulf Island Ferry Company fleet. BC Ferries bought the company's ferries and terminals on 1 September 1961 for $249,823 and renamed her Pender Queen in 1963. BC Ferries continued to operate Pender Queen in the Gulf Islands. (Griffiths and Cadieux, 42)

One event in the life of Pender Queen with B.C. Ferries was recorded by Garth Griffiths and Capt. H.L. Cadieux in their book, Dogwood Fleet. They relate a story of Pender Queen losing engine power one night near North Pender Island. She was barely rescued from going aground by Queen of Saanich under the command of Captain Amodeo. (Griffiths and Cadieux, 97)

Pender Queen was retired from service in 1980 and sold a year later for $75,300. According to Gary and Patricia Bannerman, it was sold to a Saltspring Island company. (Bannerman, 170) In June 2003 the vessel sunk in Naden Harbour on the north end of the Queen Charlotte Islands and later scrapped.
