= MV Mill Bay =

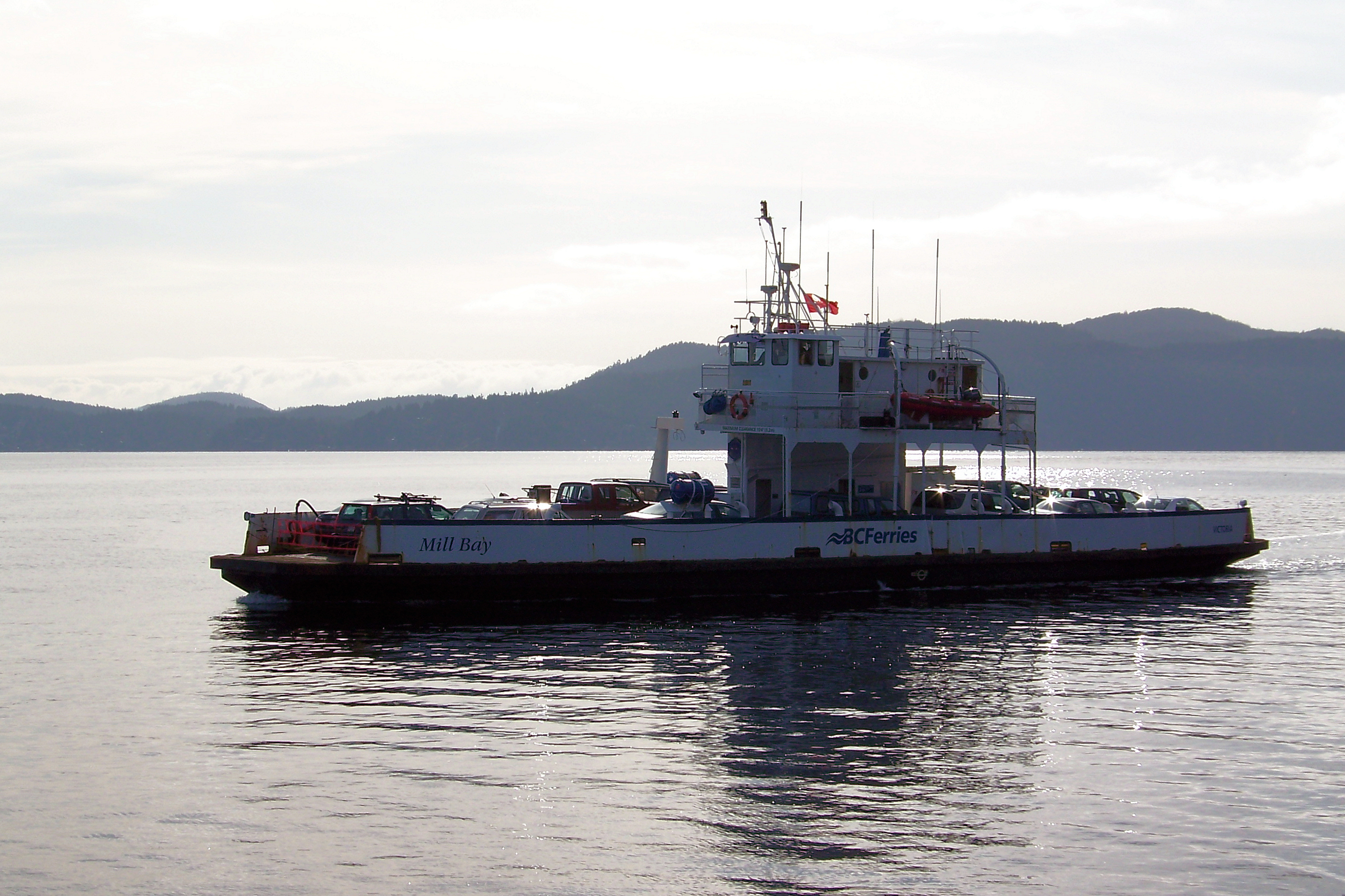
- MV Mill Bay

History

Canada
- Namesake: Mill Bay, British Columbia
- Owner: Coast Ferries Limited
- Operator: Coast Ferries Limited
- Port of registry: Victoria, British Columbia
- Route: Brentwood Bay-Mill Bay
- Builder: Victoria Machinery Depot
- Yard number: 79
- Completed: 1956
- In service: July 20, 1956
- Fate: Sold to BC Ferries in 1969

Canada
- Owner: British Columbia Ferry Services
- Operator: British Columbia Ferry Services
- Port of registry: Victoria, British Columbia
- Route: Brentwood Bay-Mill Bay
- In service: purchased 1969; late July 2001
- Out of service: July 2001 (refurbished)
- Identification: IMO number: 5235208; Official number: 198842; MMSI number: 316001239; Call sign: CZ2009
- Status: Out of service May 2011
- Notes: Replaced by MV Klitsa on Brentwood-Mill Bay route

General characteristics
- Class & type: unclassified
- Type: Roll-on/roll-off ferry
- Tonnage: 198
- Length: 37.49 m (123 ft)
- Beam: 9.94 m (32.6 ft)
- Depth: 3.6 m (11.8 ft)
- Installed power: Gardner 8L3 diesel 152 hp (113 kW) straight 8
- Propulsion: single propeller
- Speed: 9 knots (17 km/h)
- Endurance: 3.7 gallons/hour
- Capacity: 136 passengers; 16 cars
- Crew: 2

MV Mill Bay was a Canadian ferry. At 37.49 metres (123 ft) long, it was BC Ferries' second-smallest ship. It held 16 vehicles (tied with the MV Nimpkish), 138 passengers and crew, and operated at a maximum speed of 9 knots (17 km/h). The Mill Bay operated in the Brentwood Bay-Mill Bay route across Saanich Inlet on Vancouver Island.

== History ==
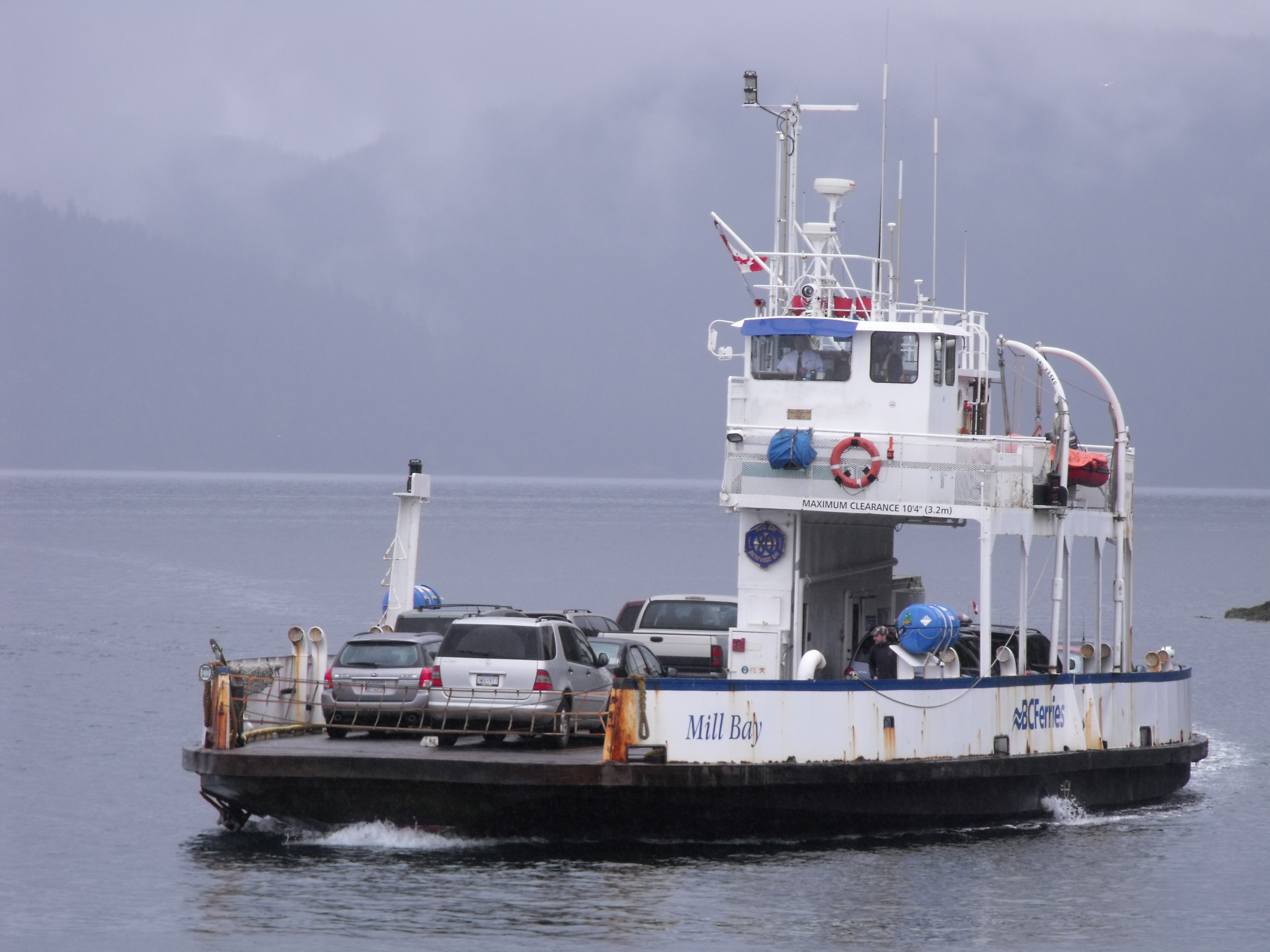
Mill Bay Ferry, 2011

The Brentwood Bay to Mill Bay ferry started operation in November 1924 by two former naval officers, Kennaird and Williams, and it is the oldest continuous ferry service on the coast of British Columbia. Initial service by the Cascade Freight and Trading Company was provided with a 22-year-old 90-foot (27 m) wooden hulled coastal steamer the SS Cascade, which was altered to allow cars to drive on or off the bow and the stern. The Cascade underwent many more alterations over the years, including replacement of her steam engines with internal combustion engines, and was eventually rechristened the Brentwood. Cascade Freight and Trading Company was bought by Coast Ferries Ltd. in 1945.

In the 1950s the more-than-50-year-old Brentwood was aging and in need of replacement. Coast Ferries Limited contracted out the construction of a new steel hulled ferry to the Victoria Machinery Depot firm in Victoria. On July 20, 1956 the Mill Bay entered service across the Saanich Inlet route and for two years both the Mill Bay and the older Brentwood both crossed the inlet while the portion of the Island Highway over the Malahat pass was being paved. In 1969 Coast Ferries Limited was bought out by BC Ferries. Thus Mill Bay is a vessel four years older than the company that currently runs her and is the oldest working ferry in the BC Ferries fleet.

The Mill Bay terminal was used for a scene during the filming of the 1970 movie Five Easy Pieces that starred Jack Nicholson and Karen Black.

On May 29, 1989 Mill Bay ran aground on the beach just south of the Mill Bay ferry terminal. No damage resulted and she was pulled safely back into deeper water. The subsequent investigation discovered that the captain at the time had fallen asleep since he had just participated in the Swiftsure Yacht Race.

On July 5, 1989 the Mill Bay was crossing Saanich Inlet when a problem arose with the fuel line and the engine lost power. As the ferry drifted the fuel line was repaired and the ferry eventually made it to shore under her own power.

In 2000 BC Ferries proposed withdrawing the service provided by the Mill Bay but local protest was strong enough to counter the proposal and preserve the service. In 2001 the Mill Bay was removed from service for two months in the summer to undergo refurbishment that included replacement of several sections of steel plating in the hull, extension of the bridge, and the addition of radar. In addition, the terminals in Mill Bay and Brentwood Bay were upgraded with all repairs to the terminals and vessel costing approximately $3.8 million (CAD).

The 80th anniversary of the ferry route was celebrated on November 27, 2004 at the Brentwood Bay terminal and aboard the Mill Bay.

On February 1, 2005 three men fell into Brentwood Bay when their canoe capsized. Reacting to the incident the crew aboard the Mill Bay picked up two of the men and the third was picked up by the Brentwood Bay Coast Guard Auxiliary.

Raymond J. Parker reported in 2009 that the Mill Bay was used by cyclists in a significant shortcut for a Vancouver Island 300 km bike route known as "Tsunami II".

== Present day ==
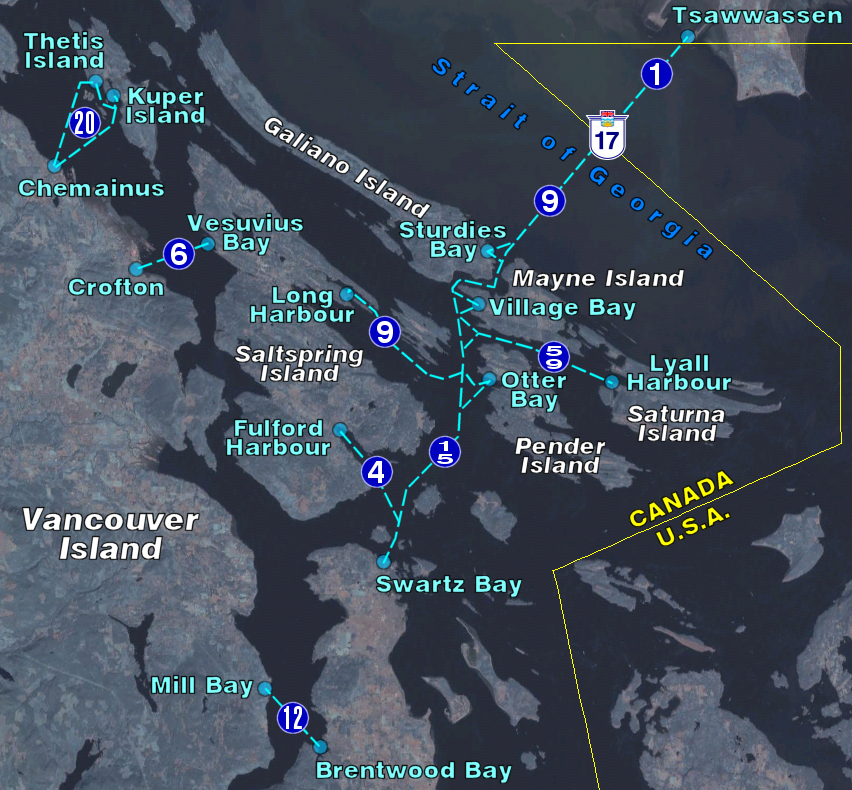
Mill Bay provides service along route "12" in this map of ferry service around southern Vancouver Island

Mill Bay is equipped with three lanes for cars, two with no height restriction and one lane that passes under the superstructure for the wheelhouse. Since the trip across the inlet takes only 20 minutes Mill Bay does not have very many amenities. She does have restrooms for passengers but they are not accessible to handicapped persons.

The Mill Bay is powered by an L Gardner & Sons model 8L3 straight-eight engine that generates 152 hp (113 kW). She burns diesel fuel at the rate of 14 litres/hour (3.7 gallons/hour) and is the most fuel efficient active vessel in the BC Ferries fleet.

In a July 2007 report prepared for the British Columbia Ministry of Transportation on traffic capacity problems over the Malahat Drive it was noted that BC Ferries' 2000 study of the Mill Bay service noted it was uneconomical. The provincial government has assured service through 2011, but BC Ferries is reported to be looking to sell service fulfillment on the route to another provider.

The fuel rebate for fares aboard the Mill Bay dropped from ten percent to five percent on January 25, 2010.

BC Ferries refers to the route served by the Mill Bay as "The Island's Most Beautiful Shortcut".

In a February 24, 2011 BC Ferries news release, the MV Mill Bay was put up for sale. The news release states that the route will be closed from May 2 – 31, 2011, and will be serviced by the MV Klitsa beginning June 1, 2011.

The MV Klitsa now (as of summer 2016) services the Brentwood Bay - Mill Bay route.
