= Queen of Nanaimo =

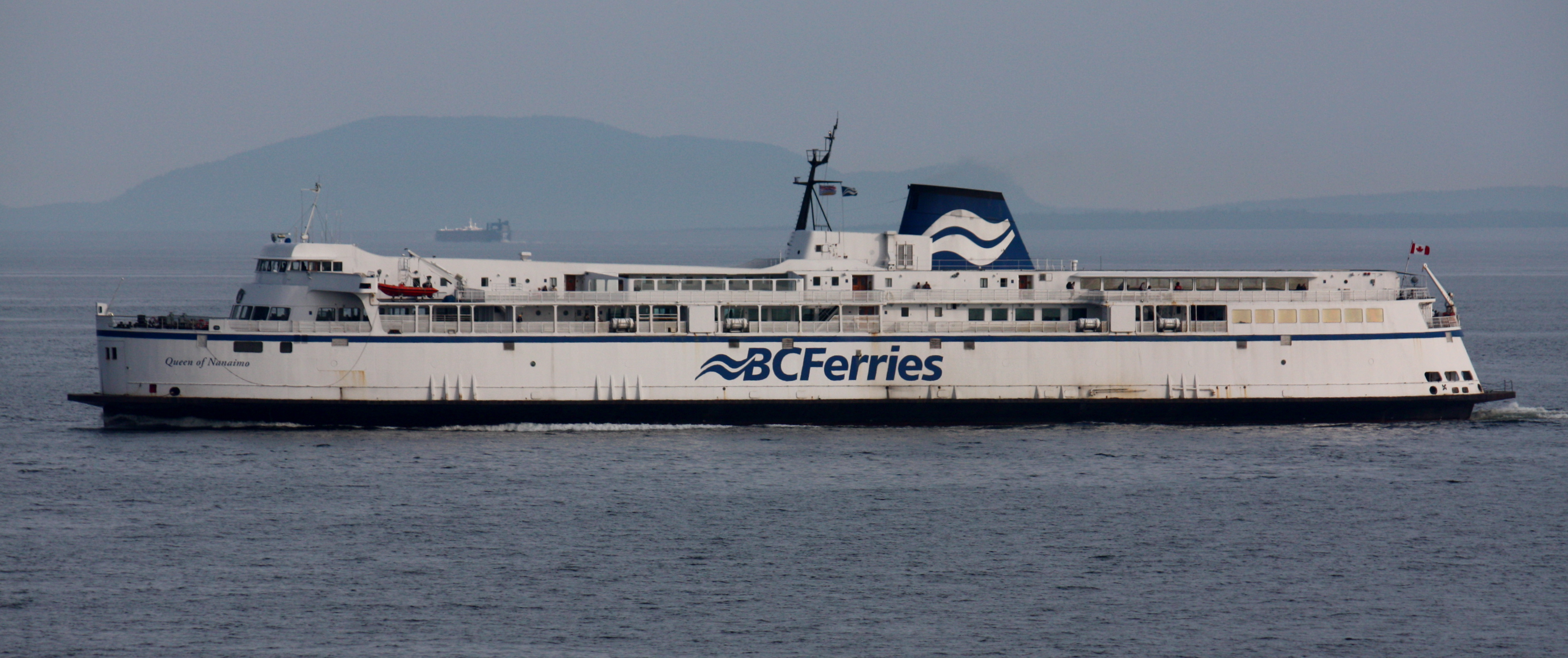
- Queen of Nanaimo near Tsawwassen

History
- Name: Queen of Nanaimo (1964–2017); Lomaiviti Princess V (2017–2022)
- Owner: BC Ferries (1964–2017); Goundar Shipping (2017–2022)
- Operator: BC Ferries; Goundar Shipping Ltd.
- Port of registry: (Canada) Victoria, British Columbia (1964–2017); Fiji (2017–2022)
- Builder: Victoria Machinery Depot, Victoria
- Launched: December 3, 1963
- Completed: June 1964
- Out of service: 2022
- Identification: IMO number: 6404375; MMSI number: 316001254; Callsign: VCNX; Official number: 320068
- Fate: Scrapped 2022

General characteristics as built
- Class & type: Burnaby-class ferry
- Tonnage: 3,545 GRT
- Length: 104.4 m (342 ft 6 in) oa; 93.8 m (307 ft 9 in) pp
- Beam: 23.9 m (78 ft 5 in)
- Propulsion: 2 × diesel engines, 2 propellers
- Speed: 18 knots (33 km/h; 21 mph)

Queen of Nanaimo was a Burnaby-class passenger vessel that was operated by BC Ferries from the time it entered service in 1964 until 2017. Queen of Nanaimo was used to ferry passengers and vehicles from mainland British Columbia, Canada to the islands off its coast. In 2017, the vessel was sold to Goundar Shipping Ltd. and renamed Lomaiviti Princess V for service in Fiji.

== Description ==
As built the ferry measured 3,545 gross register tons (GRT) with a length overall of 104.4 m (342 ft 6 in) and 93.8 m (307 ft 9 in) between perpendiculars with a beam of 23.9 m (78 ft 5 in). The vessel was powered by two diesel engines driving two propellers giving the ship a maximum speed of 18 knots (33 km/h; 21 mph).

In 1974, the ship was lengthened and Queen of Nanaimo's was measured at 130.0 m (426 ft 6 in) long overall and 119.5 m (392 ft 1 in) between perpendiculars with the tonnage remeasured at 4,938 gross tonnage (GT) and 1,141 tons deadweight (DWT). In 2006 there was a major overhaul of its passenger areas. Its propulsion is by two Mirrlees National KVSSM twin turbocharged (intercooled) single acting 4-stroke, V16 diesel engines which produce 3,000 bhp (2,200 kW) at 320 rpm. 15-inch bore by 18-inch (460 mm) stroke. Propellers are variable pitch (controllable-pitch propeller) made by KaMeWa (a Rolls-Royce company). The ship is capable of carrying 164 vehicles and 1,005 passengers and crew.

== Service history ==
The ship was built by Victoria Machinery Depot of Victoria, British Columbia, on behalf of BC Ferries with the yard number 104. Queen of Nanaimo was launched on December 3, 1963, and completed in June 1964. In 1974, the ship was rebuilt and extended 25 metres (82 ft 0 in) in length. It operated on the Tsawwassen–Gulf Islands route web in British Columbia, Canada.

Queen of Nanaimo underwent two major refits, one in 2010 and the other in 2015, to maintain Transport Canada's safety standards. On August 3, 2010, Queen of Nanaimo had a "hard landing" at the Village Bay terminal on Mayne Island. Media reports suggested at least one serious injury and damage to vessel and dock. It was later established that the landing was caused by a mechanical failure after the ship ran over a commercial crab trap, making it impossible to put the ship into reverse. On July 1, 2011, Queen of Nanaimo had another "hard landing" at the Tsawwassen terminal.

On November 2, 2013, the ship was pushed off course at Mayne Island after hitting severe weather. It damaged a private dock, but no one was injured.

On June 25, 2017, Queen of Nanaimo was taken out of service by BC Ferries due to issues with the vessel's propellers. The ferry returned to service on June 29. The vessel was retired in mid-2017 and was sold to Goundar Shipping Ltd for service in Fiji. Renamed Lomaiviti Princess V after arrival in Fiji in November, the vessel began operations on the Suva–Savusavu route in December 2017. In June 2020, Goundar Shipping announced that the vessel would be sold for scrap. In June 2022, the vessel was sold to a scrap yard in Alang, India.
