= Powell River-class ferry =

BC Ferries ship class

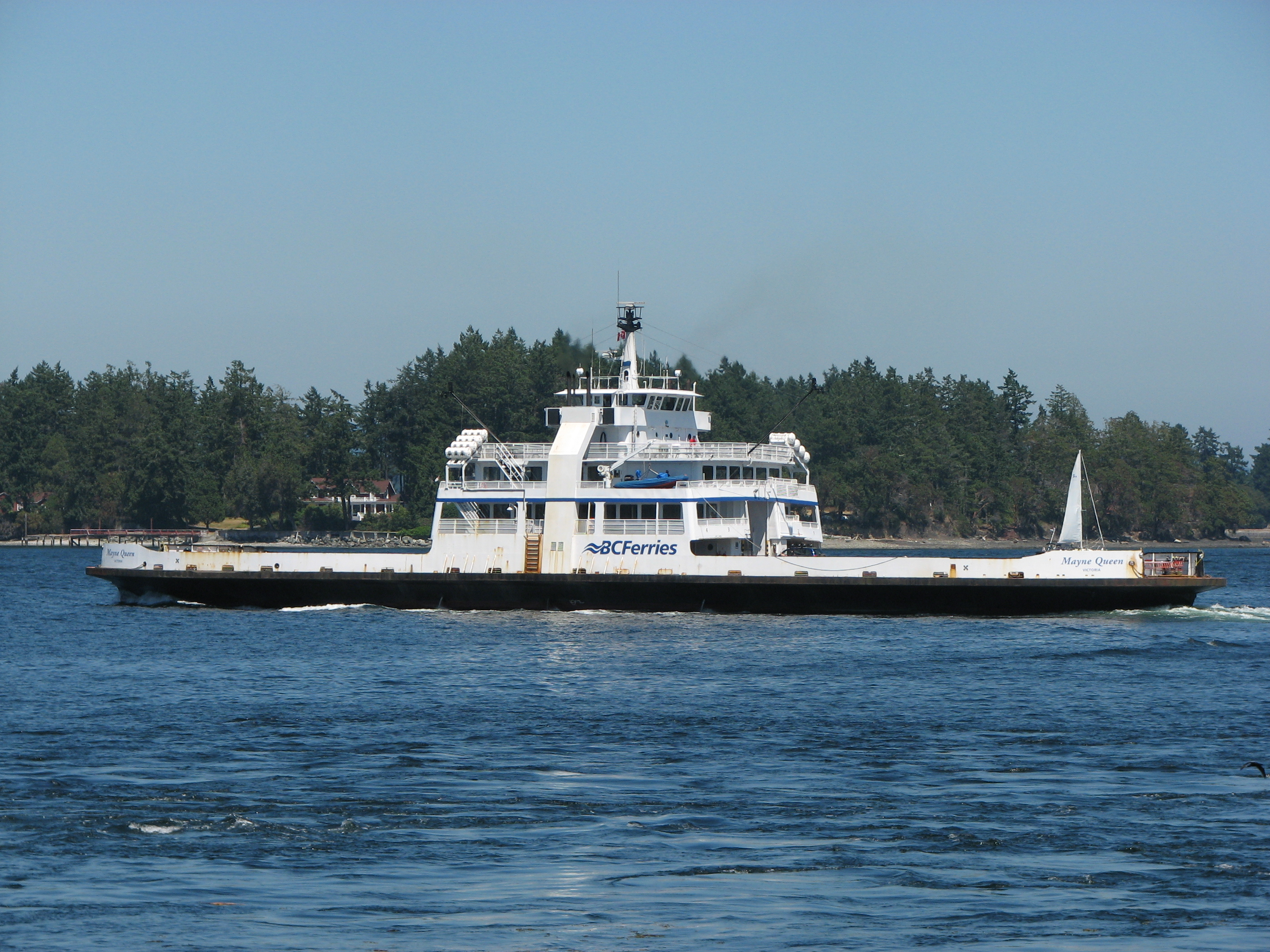
- Mayne Queen

Class overview
- Name: Powell River class
- Operators: BC Ferries
- Built: 1965
- Completed: 3
- Retired: 3

The Powell River-class ferry is a class of ships formerly operated by BC Ferries. The open deck vessels were mostly used on low-to-moderate volume routes along the British Columbia Coast, with Mayne Queen having operated permanently on Route 5, connecting the Outer Gulf Islands with Swartz Bay, Powell River Queen having served on Route 23, Campbell River to Quadra Island, and Bowen Queen having been on relief duty, typically filling in on Routes 4, 5, and 9.

By 2023, the Powell River-class ferries were all retired and superseded by new hybrid-electric Island-class ferries. When Powell River Queen, the lead ship, was retired in January 2023, she was the oldest ferry in revenue service with BC Ferries.

== History ==
In 1961, as part of Premier W. A. C. Bennett's vision to create a provincially-owned ferry service, BC Ferry Authority bought out and took over operations of the remaining routes in British Columbia owned at the time by Black Ball Ferry Line: between Horseshoe Bay and mid-Vancouver Island, between Horseshoe Bay and Bowen Island, as well as its routes in the Howe Sound and in the Jervis Inlet.

In 1965, the Victoria Machinery Depot built three minor vessels for the Authority for about a million dollar apiece to replace aging Black Ball vessels. They were each built with a capacity for 50 vehicles. The first of the class to enter service on June 16, 1965, was Powell River Queen, which was initially deployed to the waters of the Jervis Inlet to sail between Saltery Bay, south of Powell River, and Earls Cove, north of Sechelt. Her sisters, Mayne Queen and Bowen Queen, joined Powell River later that year on the Southern Gulf Islands route and the Bowen Island route, respectively.

In 1979, all three vessels of the class were stretched and re-engined for nine million dollars. This increased their capacities to 70 vehicles. Surging demand for ferry travel caused Bowen Queen and Powell River Queen to eventually be re-deployed to other routes so that larger ferries could replace them. These vessels would continue to serve until the early 2020s.

== Differences between vessels ==
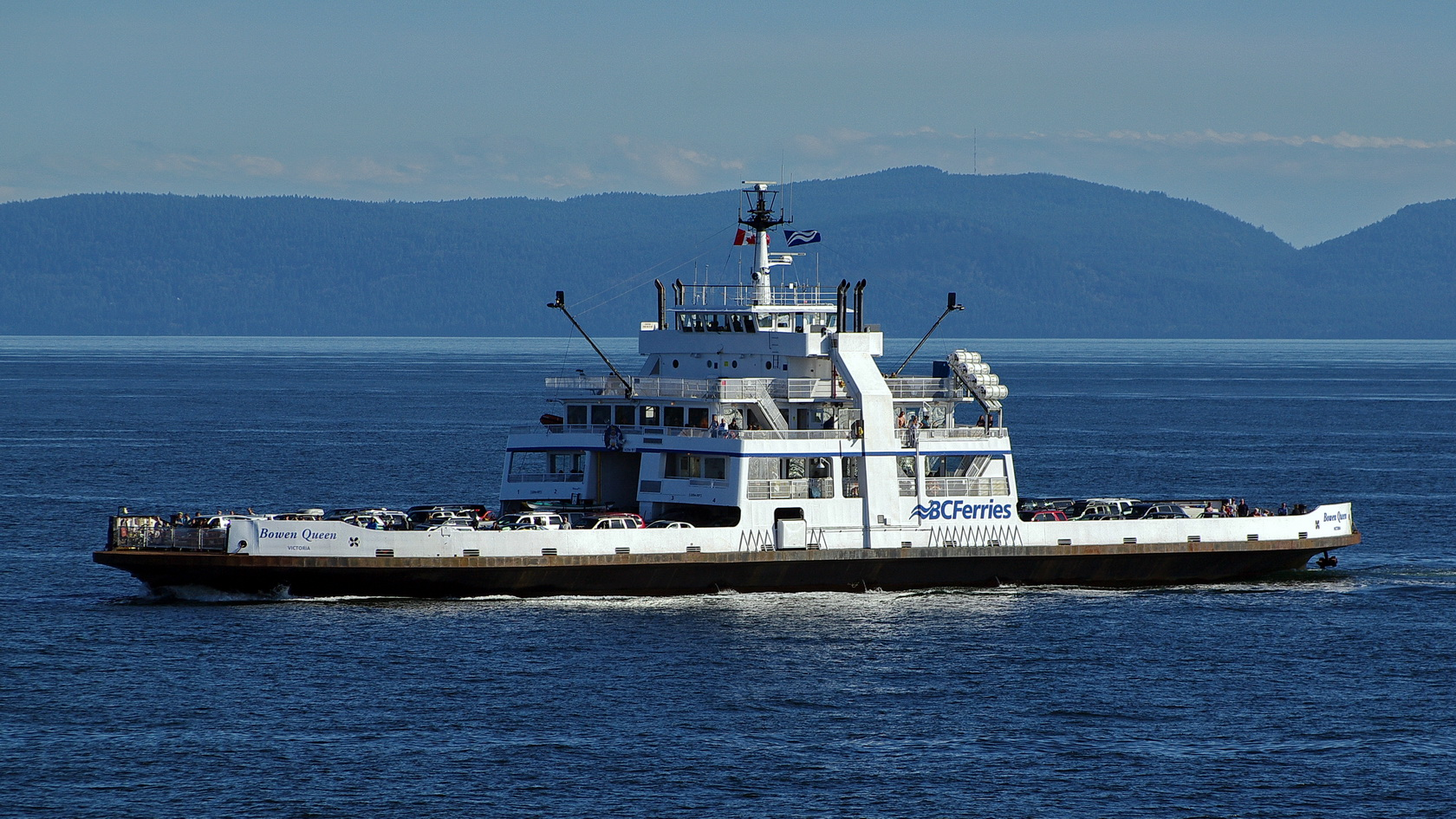
Bowen Queen

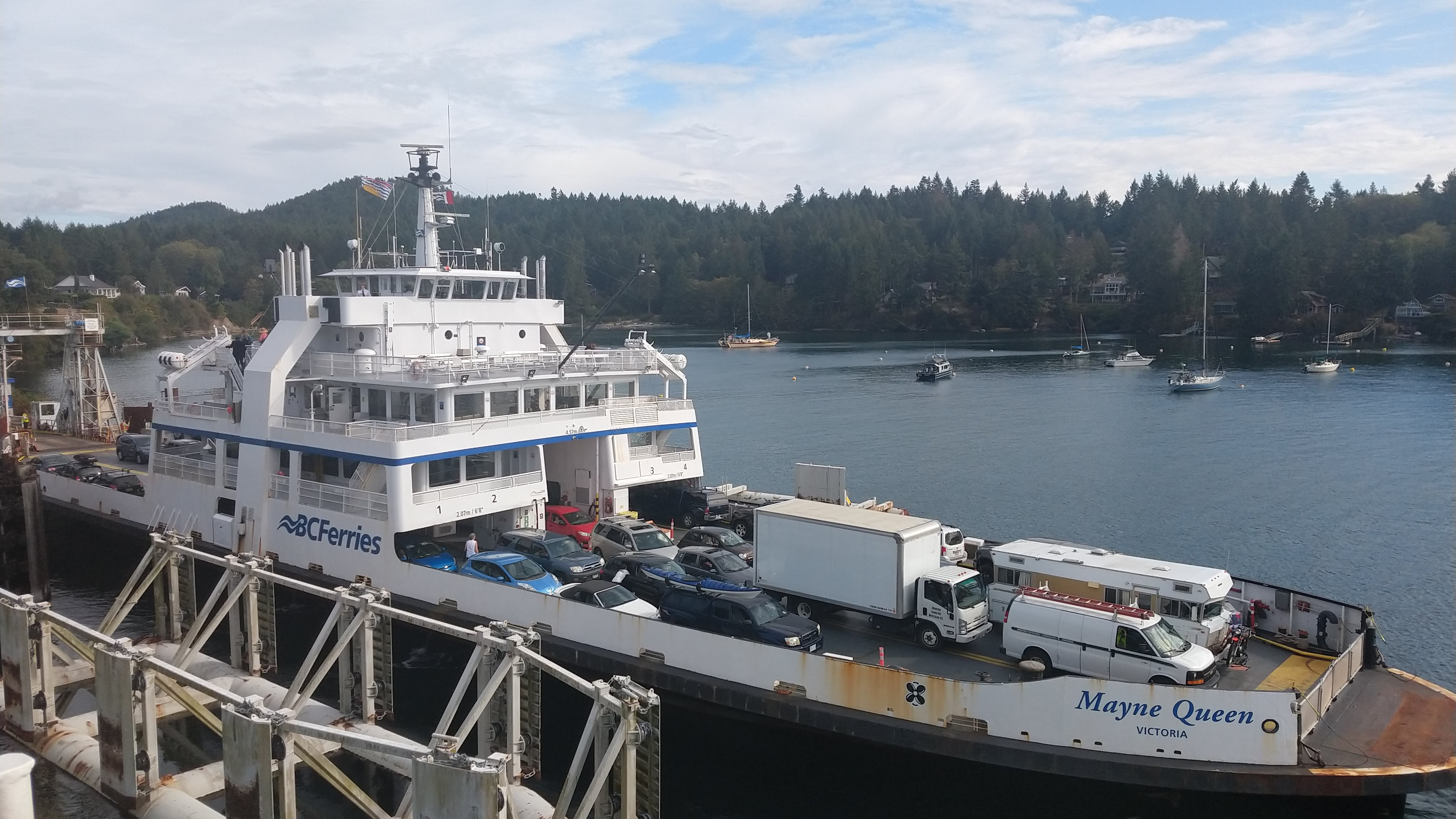
Mayne Queen, with the side ramp depression visible on the left hand side, to the right of the propeller icon and right below the rust.

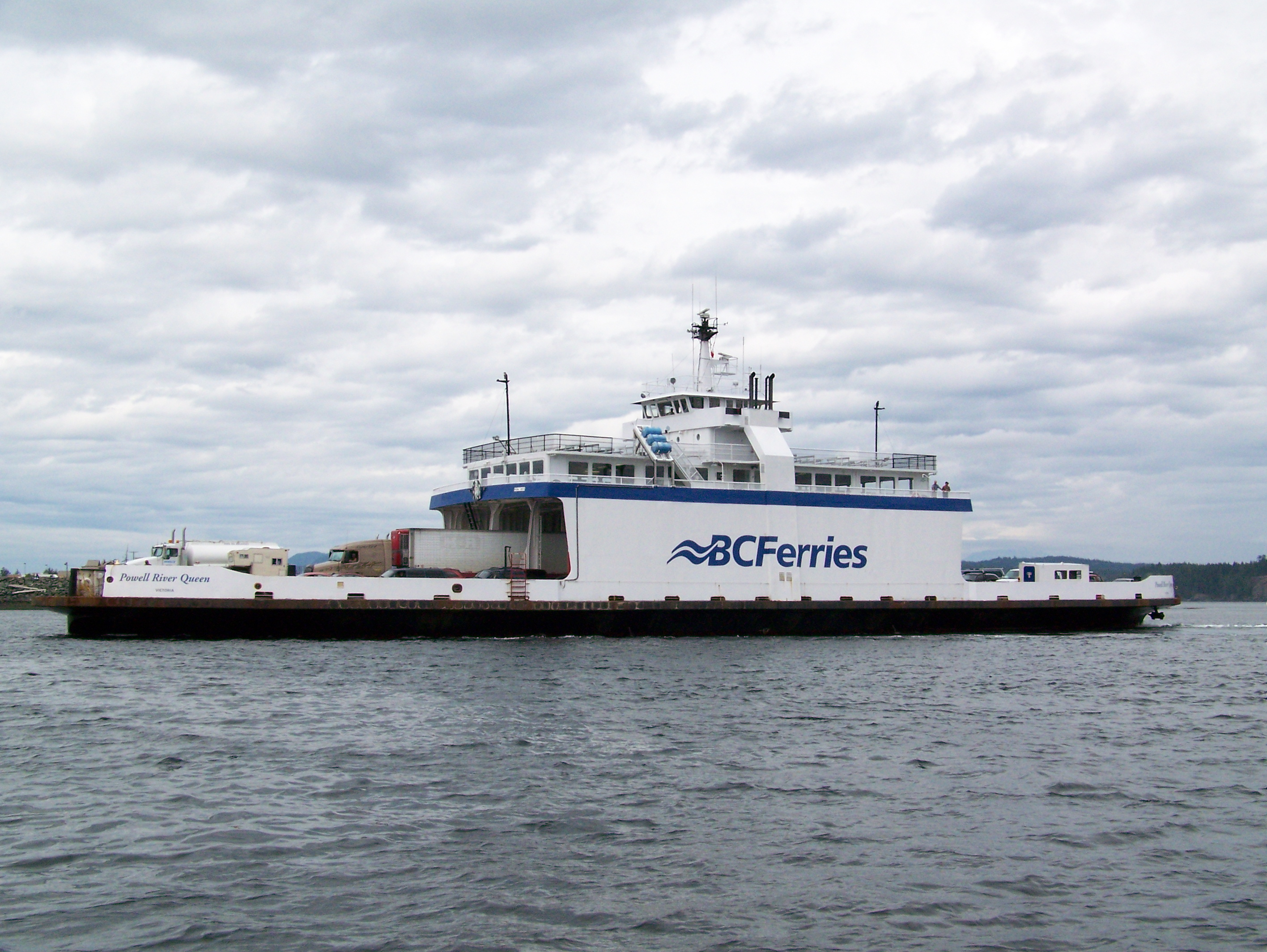
Powell River Queen, with her lack of passenger seating on Deck Three, contrary to the other vessels in the class.

There are some distinctions between vessels, most obviously the different profile of Powell River Queen – instead of having two passenger lounges on Deck Three and a centre lane for taller traffic like her sisters, Powell River Queen has all that space for overheight vehicles, resulting in the different look. Mayne Queen is the only one to have ever had side loading capabilities, for use at a pier as opposed to strictly BC Ferries terminals. These were fitted at the time of manufacture, and remained until a $9 million overhaul of the entire class in 1979 when along with being stretched and re-engined, she had her side ramp capability removed. It is still possible to see the depression in the side of the deck where the ramp once was, just behind the painted propeller warning on opposing corners of the vessel. Bowen Queen had a staffed snack bar, whereas Mayne Queen had hers removed, in favour of vending machines.

== Technical details ==
- MV Bowen Queen
  - Built: Victoria, British Columbia, 1965
  - Length: 84.96 m (278 ft 9 in)
  - Power: 3,600
  - Service speed: 14 knots
  - Gross tons: 1,475.68
  - Car capacity: 70
  - Passenger & crew capacity: 400
  - Retirement: March 27, 2022
- MV Mayne Queen
  - Built: Victoria, British Columbia, 1965
  - Length: 84.96 m (278 ft 9 in)
  - Power: 3,600
  - Service speed: 14 knots
  - Gross tons: 1,475.68
  - Car capacity: 58
  - Passenger & crew capacity: 400
  - Retirement: November 20, 2022
  - Route: Swartz Bay ↔ Outer Gulf Islands
- MV Powell River Queen
  - Built: Victoria, British Columbia, 1965
  - Length: 84.96 m (278 ft 9 in)
  - Power: 3,598
  - Service speed: 14 knots
  - Gross tons: 1,486
  - Car capacity: 59
  - Passenger & crew capacity: 400
  - Retirement: January 17, 2023
  - Route: Campbell River ↔ Quadra Island

== History ==
Bowen Queen and Mayne Queen were retired in 2022, and laid up out of service. Bowen Queen was put up for sale in 2023. Powell River Queen was laid up at Fulford Harbour's extra berth after being taken out of service on January 17, 2023. Eventually all three vessels went up for sale, but BC Ferries found no takers for Powell River Queen and Bowen Queen. The two ships began undergoing recycling by Esquimalt Graving Dock by Marine Recycling Corporation in Esquimalt in 2025. Once the ships were sufficiently broken down, the remaining hulls would be towed to a shipbreaker in Surrey, British Columbia to complete the process.

== See also ==
- List of ships in British Columbia
