= Whaletown =

Whaletown, British Columbia
- Settlement
- Location within British Columbia Location within Canada
- Coordinates: 50.100°N 125.033°W
- Country: Canada
- Province: British Columbia
- Region: Vancouver Island
- Regional District: Strathcona Regional District
- Time zone: UTC-8 (PST)
- Forward sortation area: V0P

Whaletown is a settlement on Cortes Island, British Columbia, Canada. It is known as the gateway to Cortes Island. A public ferry links Whaletown to Heriot Bay on Quadra Island.

It is featured in the 2013 Man Booker long-list work of fiction by author Ruth Ozeki, A Tale for the Time Being.

The Whaletown Water Aerodrome serves the town.
