= British Columbia K-class ferry =

1972–76 Canadian ferries

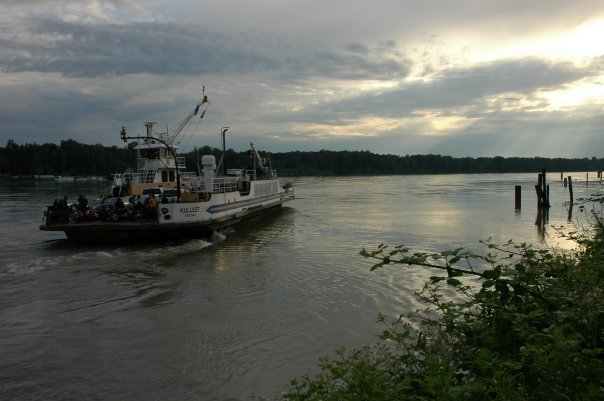
- MV Kulleet operating as the Albion Ferry in June 2009

Class overview
- Name: K class (K barge)
- Operators: BC Ferries
- Built: 1972–1975 and 2006 refit
- Completed: 6
- Active: 4
- Retired: 2

The K-class ferries (often referred to as "K-barges" due to their hull type and size) are a group of similarly designed ferries operated by both BC Ferries and TransLink in British Columbia, Canada.

With the exception of MV Pune'luxutth, all of the listed K-class vessels were built for service in British Columbia's Ministry of Highways salt water inter-island ferry fleet which was absorbed by BC Ferries in 1985.

== BC Ferries ==
=== MV Klitsa ===
(formerly MV Denman Queen)
Built: 1972, Vancouver, British Columbia
Length: 47.46 m (155 ft 9 in)
Power: 600 hp
Service Speed: 10 knots
Gross Tonnage: 352.58
Car Capacity: 26
Passenger & Crew Capacity: 195
Route: Brentwood Bay–Mill Bay
Klitsa has been in BC Ferries maintenance facility, called Deas Dock, quite often during past years. She currently services the Brentwood Bay – Mill Bay route replacing the MV Mill Bay which went up for sale on February 24, 2011. Her name comes from a mountain near Sproat Lake

=== MV Kahloke ===
Built: 1973, Vancouver, British Columbia
Length: 54.75 m (179 ft 8 in)
Power: 640 hp
Service Speed: 10 knots
Gross Tonnage: 466
Car Capacity: 30
Passenger & Crew Capacity: 200
Route: Denman Island–Hornby Island
Kahloke sometimes aided the Albion Ferries, owned by TransLink when one was out of service. This was not the first ferry named Kahloke to operate on the BC coast. The 1903 built Asbury Park served as Kahloke from 1952 to 1964 and was then renamed Langdale Queen. Her name comes from the Chinook Jargon for swan.

=== MV Kwuna ===
Built: 1975, Victoria, British Columbia
Length: 71.64 m (235 ft 0 in)
Power: 730 hp
Service Speed: 10 knots
Gross Tonnage: 347.49
Car Capacity: 26
Passenger & Crew Capacity: 154
Route: Skidegate–Alliford Bay
Kwuna is different from the other K-class vessels. It has loading ramps attached to the vessel, not to land like the others. It docks at concrete boat-launch-like ramps, then lowers the vehicle ramp down to the ground. Her name means 'point' or 'headland' in Haida and refers to a geographic feature nearby.

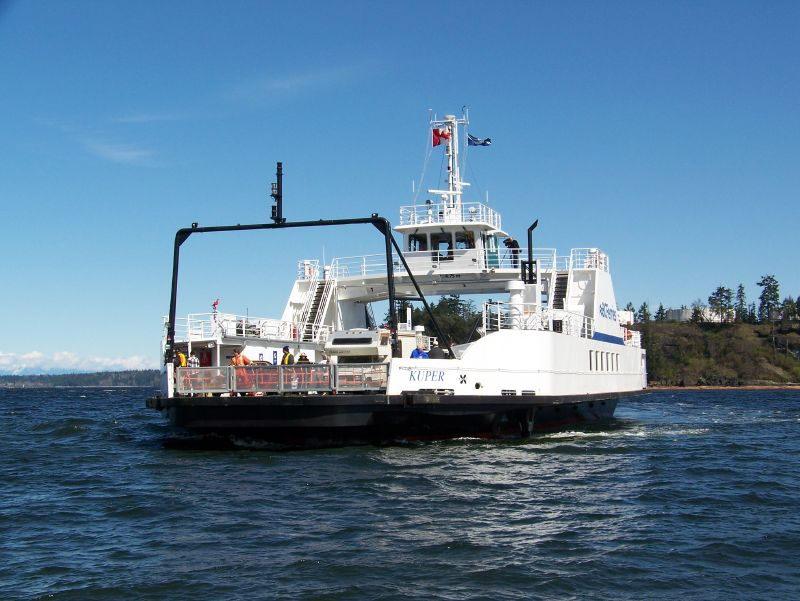
The ferry Kuper arriving at Chemainus during its first week of service in 2006

=== MV Pune'luxutth ===
(formerly MV John Atlantic Burr, and MV Kuper)
Built: 1985, Bullfrog, Utah
Rebuilt: 2006, Vancouver, British Columbia
Length: 52.21 m (171 ft 4 in)
Power: 2 x 475 hp
Service Speed: 10 knots
Gross Tonnage: 648
Car Capacity: 32
Passenger & Crew Capacity: 269
Route: Chemainus–Thetis Island–Penelakut Island
Pune'luxutth is the newest of the K-barges and started service in 2006.

The former MV John Atlantic Burr operated on Utah's Lake Powell as of early September 2005. The following winter, the vessel was cut into four sections, transported by truck to British Columbia, and reassembled as MV Kuper, with significant modification and enlargement. The ship cost US$ 200,000 and CA$4.5 million to refit and enlarge, which was considered quite a savings compared to the cost of building a new vessel which was estimated at CA$20 million. She shared her name with the former name of Penelakut Island. In December 2023, she was renamed Pune'luxutth in the spirit of reconciliation, and to recognise the harm and grief associated with the name Kuper, and its connections with the former Residential School on island. Pune'luxutth was a name chosen by the Penelakut tribe, and means Penelakut in the Hul'q'u'umi'num' language.

== TransLink ==
=== MV Kulleet ===
Built: 1972, Vancouver, British Columbia
Length: 47.46 m (155 ft 9 in)
Power: 650 hp
Service Speed: 10 knots
Gross Tonnage: 355.04
Car Capacity: 26
Passenger & Crew Capacity: 150
Route: Albion–Fort Langley (Defunct)

=== MV Klatawa ===
Built: 1972, Vancouver, British Columbia
Length: 47.46 m (155 ft 9 in)
Power: 650 hp
Service Speed: 10 knots
Gross Tonnage: 347.58
Car Capacity: 26
Passenger & Crew Capacity: 150
Route: Albion–Fort Langley (Defunct)

Both Kulleet and Klatawa were owned and operated by Metro Vancouver's Transportation Authority, TransLink, and they ran the Albion–Fort Langley route on the Fraser River, between the Maple Ridge suburb of Albion south to McMillan Island in Fort Langley. On July 31, 2009, the Albion Ferry was shut down after the opening of the Golden Ears Bridge. The ferry had connected Maple Ridge and Langley via the Fraser River since 1957. Kulleet and Klatawa had been put into service in the 1980s.

The two Albion ferries were sold for $400,000 – less than half of the original asking price of $1.1 million. TransLink said in a news release on December 30, 2011, that MV Kulleet and MV Klatawa have been bought by Tidal Towing, a B.C.-based company. Both ships have since been bought and renamed by Diversified Marine of Halfmoon Bay. Klatawa has been renamed to Marena Mac and Kulleet to Nelson Mac.

Both ships' names are of native origin, with Klatawa being the verb 'to go' in Chinook Jargon and Kulleet referring to Kulleet Bay, which literally means 'Bay Bay' as Kulleet means 'bay' in Island Halkomelem.
