= MV Nimpkish =

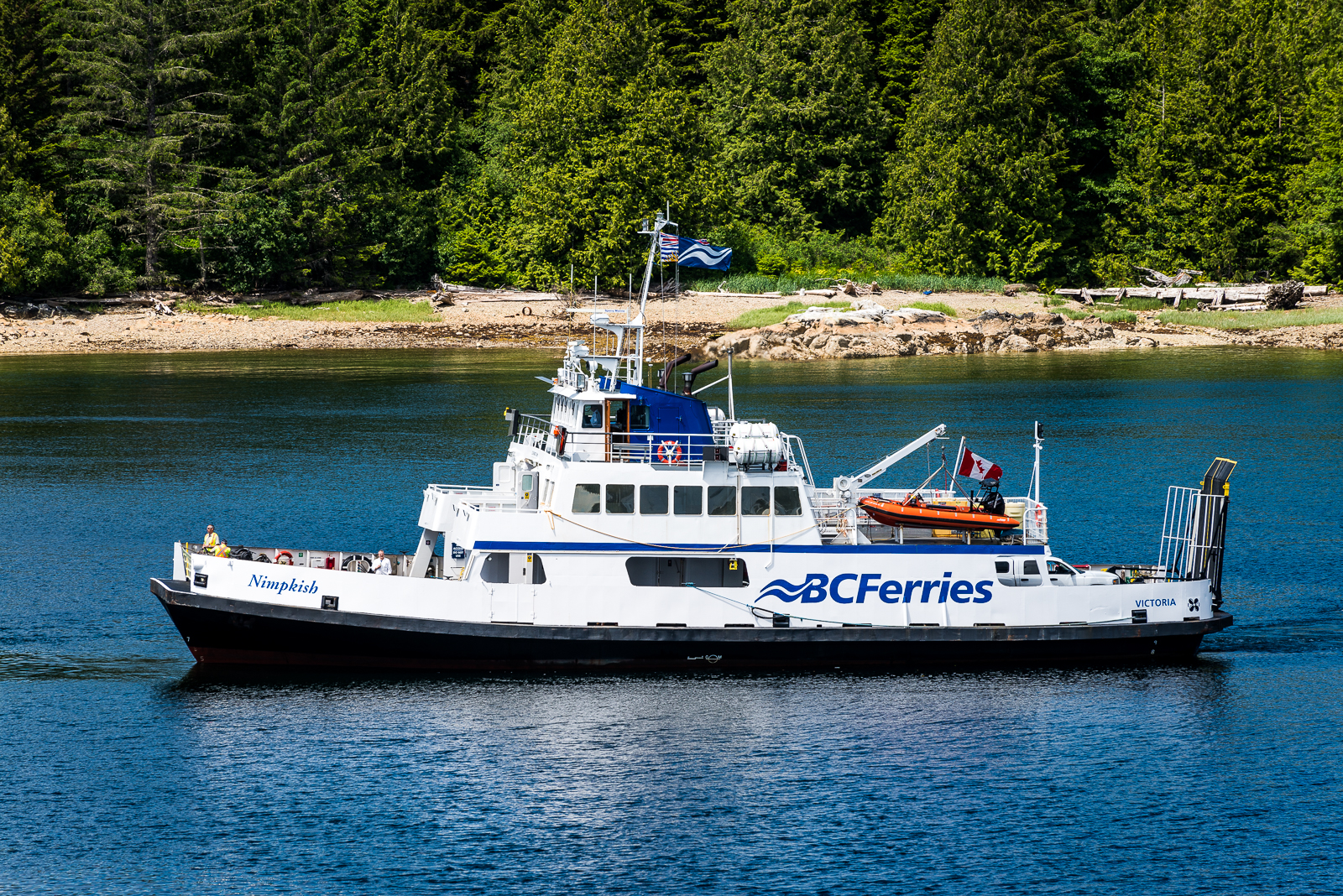
- Nimpkish

History

Canada
- Name: Nimpkish (1973–2020); Midcoaster (2020–present)
- Namesake: Nimpkish Lake
- Owner: British Columbia Ministry of Transportation (1973–1985); BC Ferries (1985–2020)
- Operator: BC MoT (1973–1985); BC Ferries (1985–2020)
- Route: Discovery Coast Connector service
- Builder: Vancouver
- Completed: 1973
- Out of service: 2020
- Identification: IMO number: 7324388; MMSI number: 316001241; Callsign: CZ2741
- Status: Out of service

General characteristics
- Class & type: N-class RORO ferry
- Displacement: 371 t (365 long tons)
- Length: 33.53 m (110 ft 0 in)
- Installed power: 680 hp (510 kW)
- Speed: 11 knots (20 km/h; 13 mph)
- Capacity: 95 passengers and crew; 12 cars

MV Nimpkish is an N-class ferry formerly owned by BC Ferries. Entering service with the British Columbia Ministry of Transportation in 1973, the vessel was transferred to BC Ferries in 1985. Beginning in 2014 the ship did runs on the Discovery Coast Connector service, for which the ship received a negative reception, and was replaced in 2017. The ship was formally sold in 2020.

== Design and description ==
The ferry is 33.93 metres (111 ft 4 in) long with a breadth of 12 m (39 ft 4 in), a displacement of 371 tonnes (365 long tons) and measures 266 gross tonnage (GT) and 94 tons deadweight (DWT). Nimpkish is a roll-on/roll-off ferry that has capacity for 12 vehicles and 95 passengers. The vessel's engines create 680 horsepower (510 kW) and give Nimpkish a maximum speed of 11 knots (20 km/h; 13 mph). Passenger amenities on-board are sparse, with only a passenger lounge, self-serve food station and a washroom available.

== Service history ==
The ship was constructed by Rivtow Industries of Vancouver and entered service with the Ministry of Transportation's Salt Water division in 1973, to serve the inter-island routes. The vessel was transferred to BC Ferries in 1985. Nimpkish is the sister ship of Albert J. Savoie and Nicola. The former was retired and the latter is on a bare deck lease at Prince Rupert.

Nimpkish operated on the Discovery Coast Connector service after Queen of Chilliwack was taken out of service in 2014. Operating between Bella Bella and Bella Coola with stops at Port Hardy, Shearwater, Klemtu, and Ocean Falls, the ship's reception was negative with the experience being described as lacking room aboard the ship and insufficient facilities. Tourists and passengers aboard the ship noted the only redeeming factor had been the scenery and the "amazing hospitality of the crew". It was replaced on the Discovery Coast Connector service by Northern Sea Wolf in 2017.

BC Ferries agreed to sell Nimpkish in 2018 to a private buyer, with the sale being completed in September 2020. The vessel was renamed Midcoaster.
