= Northern Sea Wolf =

Canadian ferry

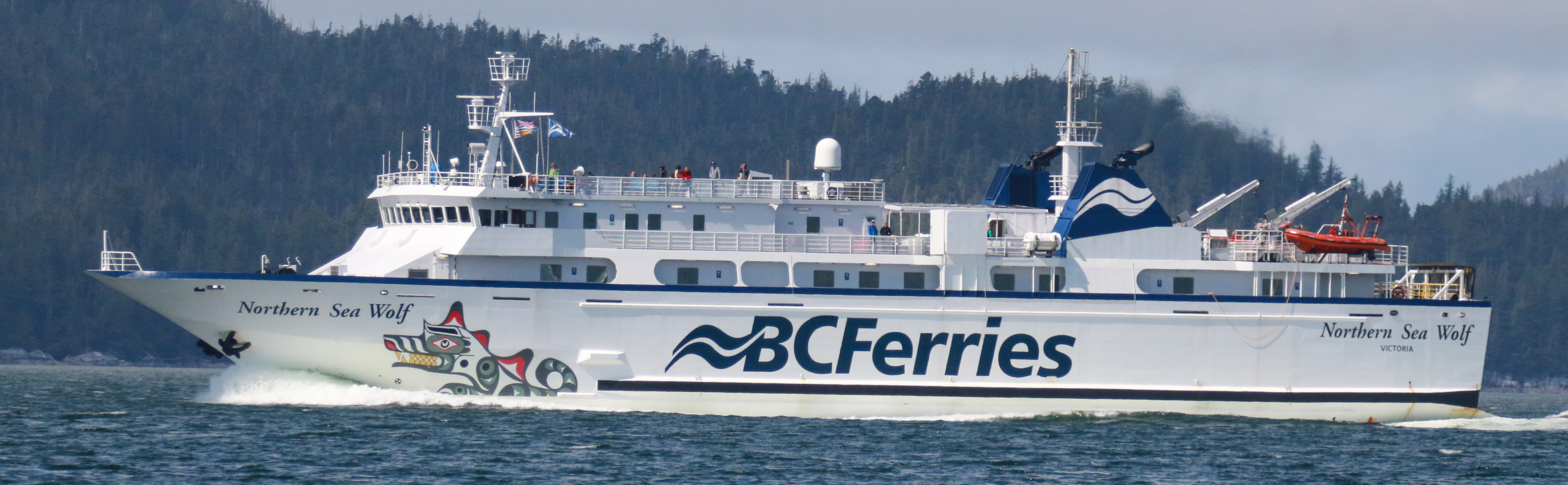
- Northern Sea Wolf

History

Greece
- Name: Agios Andreas II
- Owner: Agios Andreas Shipping
- Operator: Agios Andreas Shipping (2000–2004); Kefalonia Line (2004–2005)
- Port of registry: Piraeus, Greece
- Builder: Panagiotakis Brothers, Salamis, Greece
- Launched: 2000
- Completed: 2000
- Maiden voyage: 2000
- Notes: Sold

Greece
- Name: Andreas II
- Owner: Atlas V Shipping
- Acquired: 2005

Sweden
- Name: Mr Shoppy One
- Owner: Orvelin Group
- Acquired: 2007

Greece
- Name: Aqua Spirit
- Owner: Orveline Hellenic Shipping Company
- Operator: NEL Lines (2011–2016); Seajets (2016–2017)

Canada
- Name: Northern Sea Wolf
- Owner: British Columbia Ferry Services Inc.
- Operator: BC Ferries
- Port of registry: Victoria, British Columbia
- Route: Bella Coola to Port Hardy Also Bella Coola to Ocean Falls, Denny Island (Shearwater), Bella Bella year round
- Cost: CAD$12.6 million purchase price; $62.4 million refit cost
- Acquired: August 30, 2017
- In service: June 3, 2019
- Identification: IMO number: 9212450; Official Number 841406; MMSI number: 316036676; Callsign: CFA2669
- Status: In service

General characteristics
- Type: Ferry
- Tonnage: 2,695 GT; 1,090 NT
- Length: 76.38 m (250 ft 7 in)
- Beam: 15 m (49 ft 3 in)
- Draft: 4.2 m (13 ft 9 in)
- Ramps: One on transom
- Installed power: 2 × 2,399 kW (3,217 hp) Cummins diesel engines
- Propulsion: 2 propellers
- Speed: 15 knots (28 km/h; 17 mph)
- Capacity: Passengers: 150; Vehicles: 35 cars; 353 DWT

Northern Sea Wolf is a roll-on/roll-off (RORO) ferry operated by BC Ferries in British Columbia, Canada. Her normal sailing schedule is five days a week during the peak summer season on the Inside Passage route connecting Bella Coola and Port Hardy. The route normally takes about ten hours to complete. Her schedule calls for one trip per day during daylight hours to maximize passenger enjoyment of the scenery. Lack of sufficient crew accommodation limits voyage to 12 hours per day precluding travel for indigenous tourism to the outer coast towns without a multiple days or week visit.

Uniquely for a BC Ferries vessel, the Northern Sea Wolf does not have doors on both ends, requiring vehicles to either turn around after boarding or reverse down the loading ramp.

== Description and construction ==
The ship was the vision of the leader of Agios Andreas shipping company Captain Michalis Boutsis and his partners. She was designed by the naval architect Nikos Petichakis. The ship was built at the Ambelaki Shipyard at Ambelaki, Salamis, Greece by the Panagiotakis Brothers company. Her hull is built of welded steel plates. She is 76.38 metres (250 ft 7 in) long, with a beam of 15 metres (49 ft 3 in). She has a large vehicle loading ramp that comprises most of her transom. She cruises at 15 knots (28 km/h; 17 mph), driven by two propellers. Propulsion power is provided by two 2,399-kilowatt (3,217 hp) Cummins diesel engines. She was launched in 2000.

=== Amenities ===
Northern Sea Wolf features these passenger amenities:

- Coastal Cafe
- Outdoor observation deck
- First Nations art. The ship is decorated with Kwakiutl and Nuxalk art on both the interior and exterior of the ship.
- Car decks have been arranged to accept over-height vehicles

== European service ==
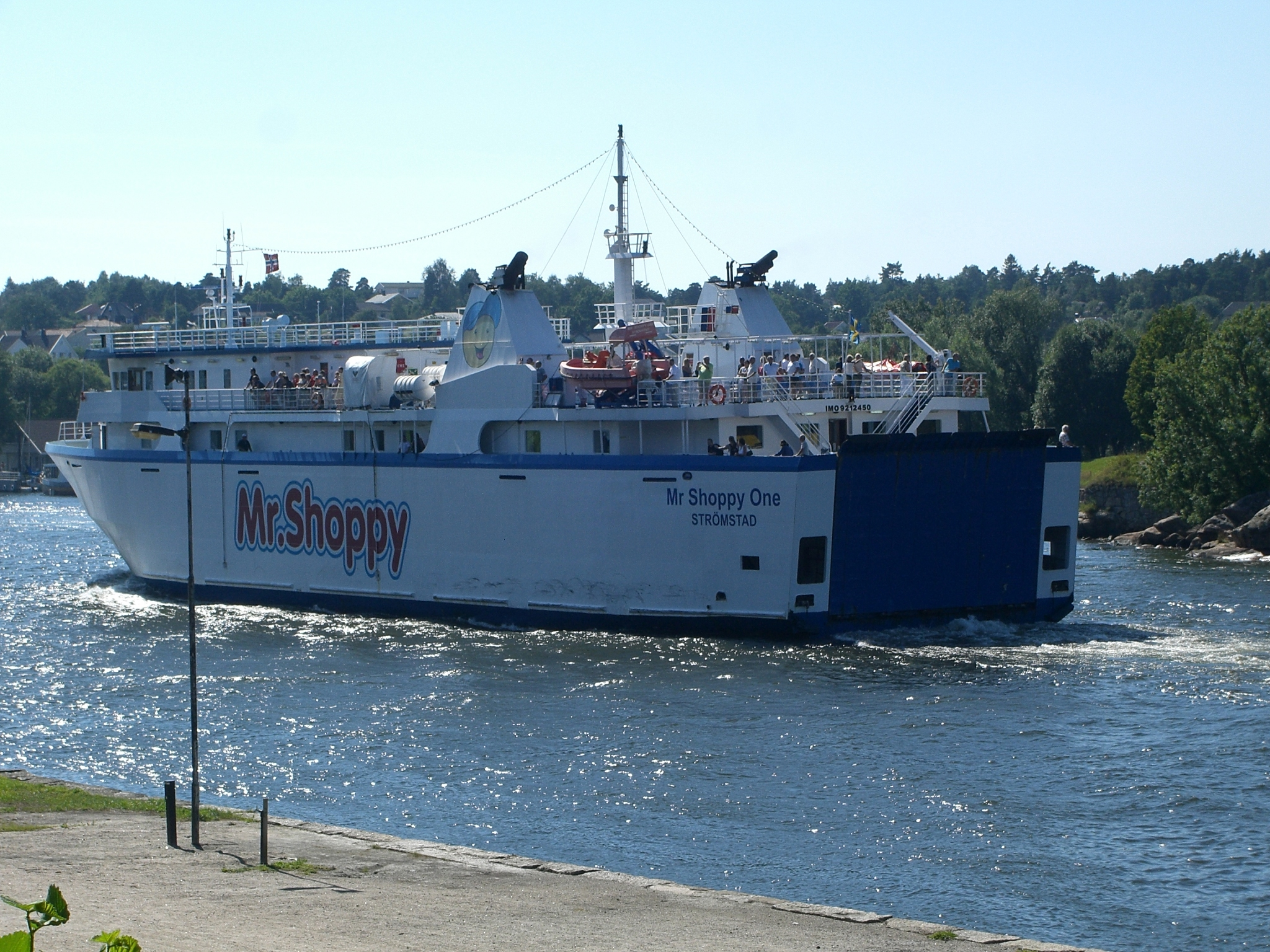
Mr. Shoppy One

The ship was christened Agios Andreas II. She began her life as a ferry on the Piraeus to Aegina route in Greece. In 2004 she was chartered to the Kefalonia Line and sailed between islands in the Ionian Sea.

In July 2005 she was sold to Atlas V Shipping and renamed Andreas II. Under this new ownership, she sailed between Kythira Island and Neapoli Voion in Greece.

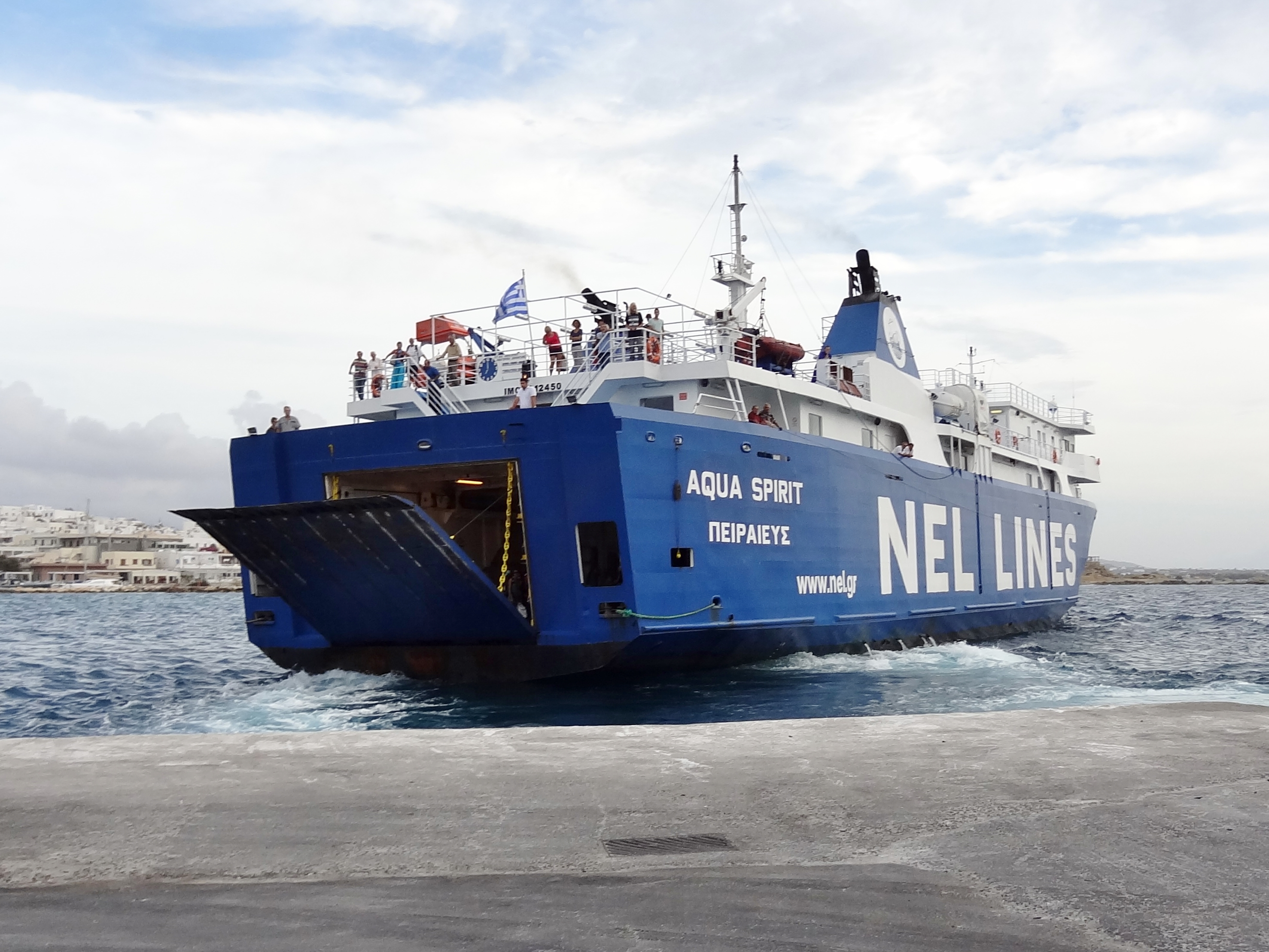
Aqua Spirit at Naxos in 2013.

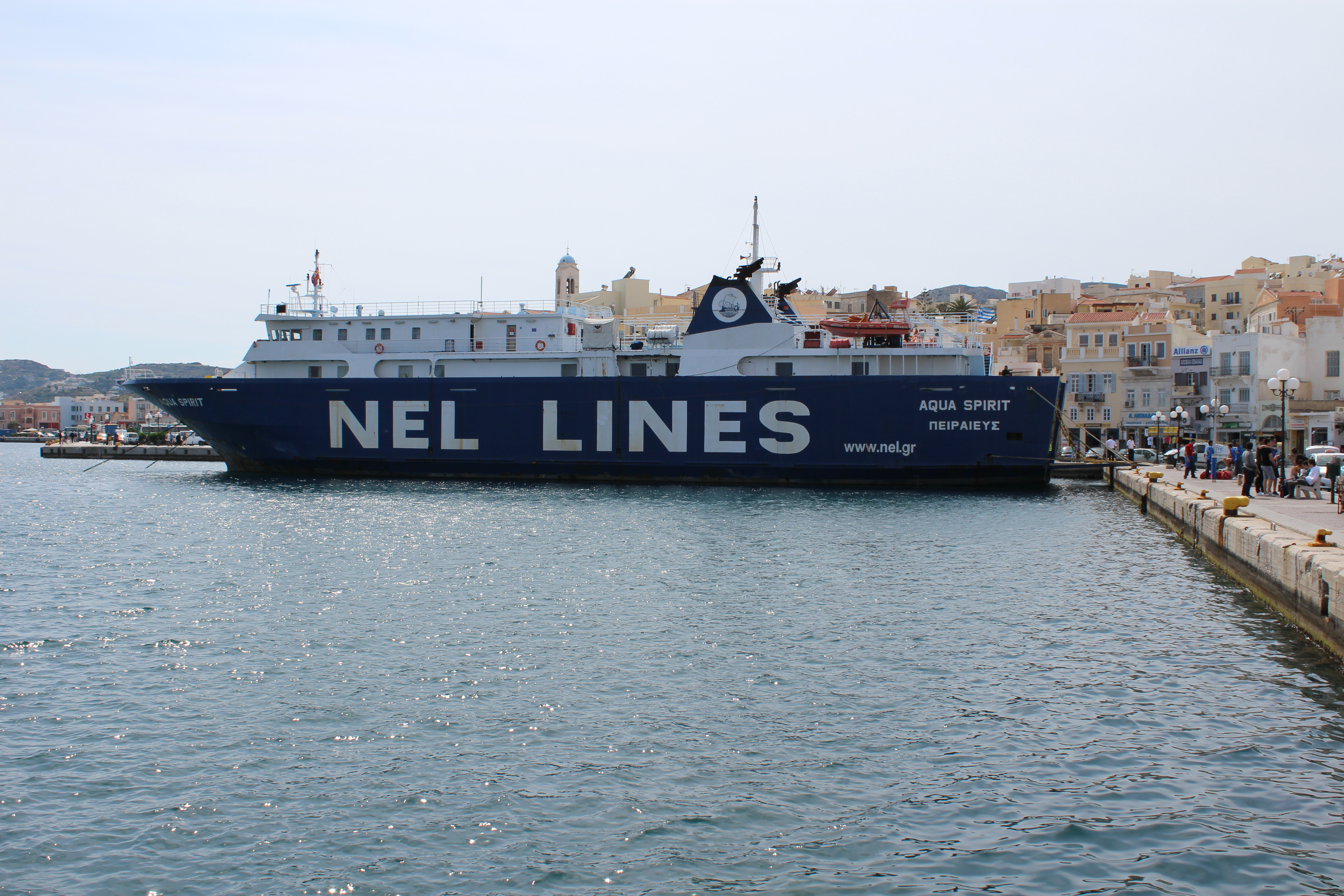
Aqua Spirit at Syros.

In October 2007 she was acquired by a Swedish company, Orvelin Group, and renamed Mr. Shoppy One. During this period she shuttled across the Skagerrak, between Strömstad, Sweden and Tønsberg, Norway, and on Mondays between Strömstad and Skagen, Denmark. The motivation of her Norwegian passengers was to buy liquor and other goods in Sweden, where taxes were lower, and then sail home. Norwegian customs authorities resisted the loss of tax revenue and fined Overlin Group SEK9 million. Overlin's countersuit failed and the ship was laid up in Gothenburg in 2009.

On April 28, 2011 the ship was sold to Orveline Hellenic Shipping Company of Piraeus. The company executed a five-year bareboat charter agreement with NEL Lines which renamed the ship Aqua Spirit. She departed Gothenburg on June 14, 2014 for her new assignment. She returned to Greece and served as a ferry in the Cyclades in the Aegean Sea. She was idled when NEL Lines went bankrupt in 2015. In February 2016 she was chartered to Seajets and continued her service among the Cyclades.

== British Columbia service ==
BC Ferries provided direct Bella Coola - Port Hardy service using Queen of Chilliwack until 2013 when it was cancelled by the provincial government due to steep financial losses on the route. The minister of transportation at the time reported that British Columbia taxpayers paid a $2,500 subsidy for each vehicle on the ferry. Tourism operators were hurt by the cancellation and put pressure on the government to restore service. During the 2017 provincial election campaign, Premier Christy Clark promised to restore the service in 2018.

The premier's short timeframe ruled out building a new ship. After a global search, BC Ferries identified Aqua Spirit, then 17 years old, as its best choice. On August 30, 2017, she was acquired for CAD$12.6 million. BC Ferries renamed the ship Northern Sea Wolf after a process of community engagement. The name honors a First Nations legend that the sea wolf is a manifestation of the orca. After dry-docking in Malta, the ship sailed to Esquimalt, British Columbia via the Panama Canal. The voyage took 35 days with fuel stops in the Canary Islands, Antigua, Panama, and Manzanillo.

On arrival in British Columbia, in January 2018, Northern Sea Wolf was sent to Esquimalt Drydock Company for a major refit. The main propulsion engines and gearboxes were overhauled. New electrical generators were installed and electrical switchboards upgraded. Navigation and safety systems were upgraded. A full galley was added. Passenger accommodations and crew spaces were reconfigured and refurbished. When work began, however, a number of deficiencies that had been missed by both the classification societies and BC Ferries' own surveyors became apparent. These included problems with the fire safety systems, corrosion, propeller shafts, and HVAC systems. BC Ferries was unable to meet the premier's goal of having the ship in service during the 2018 season. It was a year late. Similarly, while the budget for the acquisition and refit of the ship was $55.7 million, the final cost was $75 million, 30% over budget. The Canadian federal government contributed $15.1 million to the project.

Northern Sea Wolf made her maiden commercial voyage on her Bella Coola - Port Hardy route on June 3, 2019. During the course of the 2019 season, the ship made 130 trips. She carried more than 5,750 passengers and 2,265 vehicles. In 2019 adult fares started at $199.25, and standard cars were carried for $403.

On November 22, 2019, Northern Sea Wolf hit a log while underway. The log strike damaged both propellers, necessitating dry-docking the vessel for repairs. She was replaced by the smaller ferry Nimpkish. In April 2020, BC Ferries announced that Northern Sea Wolf would not run during the 2020 season due to decreased travel during the COVID-19 pandemic. The off-season schedule would continue to be run by the Nimpkish.

BC Ferries returned Northern Sea Wolf to its central British Columbia route in the second half of 2020. With the return to service of the larger ship, Nimpkish was sold on September 20, 2020. Northern Sea Wolf resumed her regular summer route between Bella Coola and Port Hardy on June 19, 2021.
