= Island-class ferry =

Class of ferry

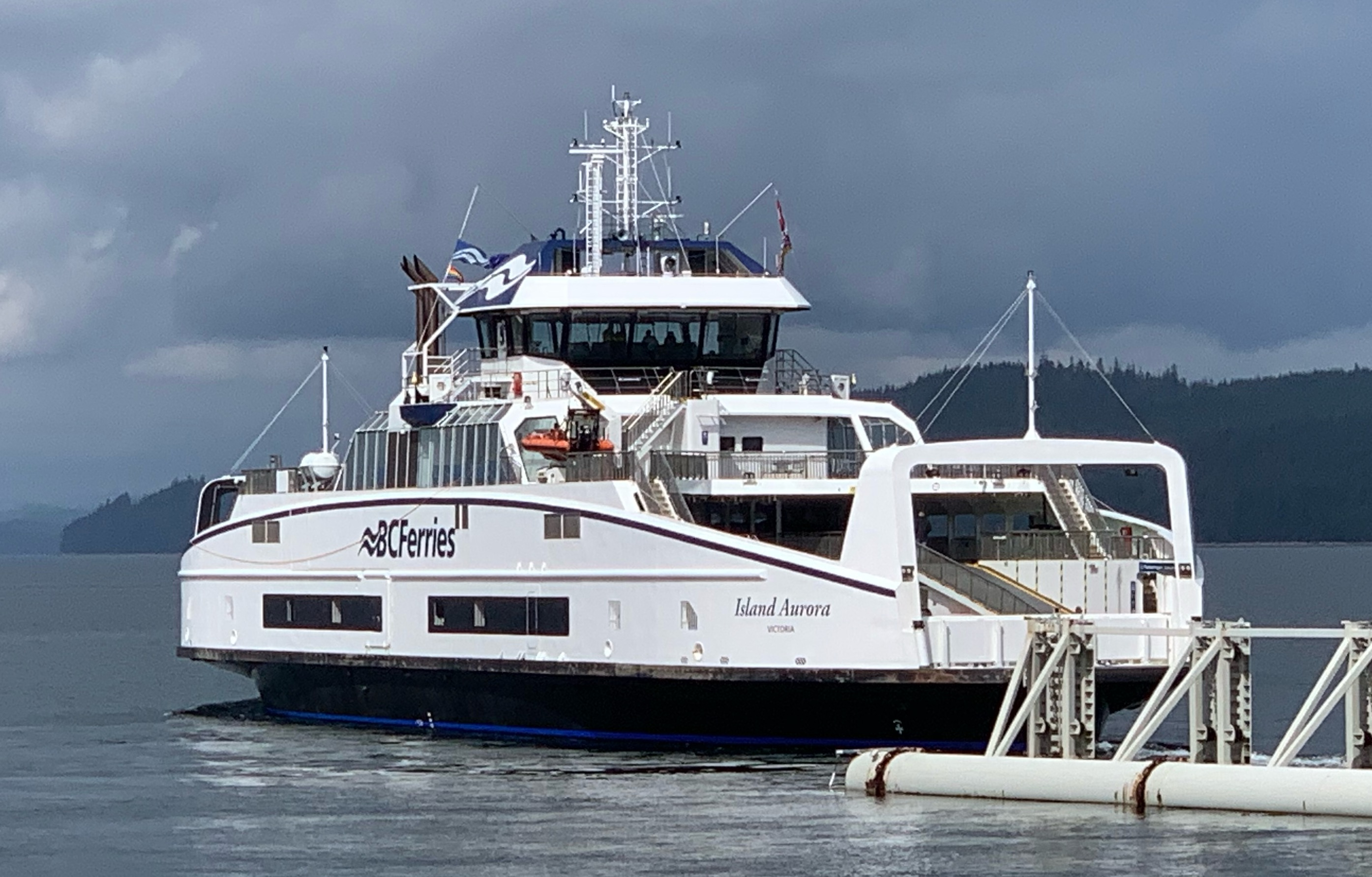
- Island Aurora

Class overview
- Name: Island class
- Builders: Damen Shipyards Galați
- Operators: BC Ferries
- Preceded by: T class; Powell River class
- Built: 2019–present
- In service: 2020–present
- Planned: 10
- On order: 2
- Completed: 8
- Active: 8

General characteristics
- Type: Ferry
- Length: 80.80 m (265 ft 1 in)
- Beam: 17.00 m (55 ft 9 in)
- Draught: 3.35 m (11 ft 0 in)
- Depth: 5.70 m (18 ft 8 in)
- Installed power: 2 × 1,500 kW (2,000 hp) diesel generators; 2 × 400 kW battery packs
- Propulsion: 2 × 900 kW (1,200 hp) azimuth thrusters, electric drive
- Speed: 14 knots (26 km/h; 16 mph)
- Capacity: 399 passengers and crew
- Crew: 5-7

The Island-class ferries are ferries owned and operated by BC Ferries. Six vessels were built between 2019 and 2021 by Damen Shipyards Group, a Dutch company, in Galați, Romania. The first two ships were launched in mid-March 2019, and commenced service in June 2020. Four additional vessels commenced service in 2022. A further two vessels joined the fleet in 2026.

The vessels are powered by a diesel-electric hybrid system and will transition to full electric operation when shore-side electric charging stations and funding becomes available.

== Description ==
The Island-class vessels were designed by Damen Shipyards Group as Damen Road Ferry 8117 E3, with input from both the public and BC Ferries. The ferries are diesel-electric hybrid-powered, measuring 80.8 metres (265 ft 1 in) long and having a beam of 17 metres (55 ft 9 in). Each ship has the capacity to hold 47 vehicles, and up to 392 passengers dependent on crewing levels. Features include a gallery deck for increased vehicle capacity, heated solariums on both sides of the sun deck, an indoor passenger lounge on the main car deck, and a small pet area. When introduced, the vessels were also the most environmentally friendly in the fleet, as they will switch from the current hybrid technology to operating fully electric when shore-side electric charging equipment is installed. In addition, the Island-class ships are extremely quiet, creating less underwater radiated noise disturbance to marine life and providing a more enjoyable sailing for passengers. BC Ferries has also said that the weather conditions tolerance of the Island class is similar to their larger major vessel classes. The vessels are double ended and are considered the minor class of the BC Ferries standardization plan.

== Island-class vessels ==
Island class construction data
Photo	Name	Launched	Delivered	Routes	Status	Notes
	MV Island Discovery	March 2019	January 18, 2020	18 – Powell River – Texada Island	In service	Began service on June 10, 2020
	MV Island Aurora	March 2019	January 18, 2020	25 – Port McNeil – Alert Bay – Sointula	In service	Began service on June 18, 2020
	MV Island Nagalis	October 29, 2020	July 22, 2021	24 - Quadra Island - Cortes Island	In service	Began service on January 18, 2023, on route 23. Moved to route 24 on June 25, 2026
	MV Island K'ulut'a	December 17, 2020	August 13, 2021	23 – Campbell River – Quadra Island	In service	Began service on January 17, 2023
	MV Island Kwigwis	February 22, 2021	September 28, 2021	23 - Campbell River – Quadra Island	In service	Began service on April 12, 2022, on route 19. Moved to route 23 on June 20, 2026.
	MV Island G̲wawis	April 22, 2021	December 23, 2021	19 – Nanaimo Harbour – Gabriola Island	In service	Began service on April 12, 2022
	MV Island xwsaĺux̌ul	November 24, 2024	May 7, 2026	19 – Nanaimo Harbour – Gabriola Island (auxiliary)	In service	Began service on June 20, 2026
	MV Island sarlequun	November 24, 2024	June 21, 2026	19 – Nanaimo Harbour – Gabriola Island	In service	Began service on September 14, 2026
	MV Island Gwa̲’ya̲m	TBA	TBA	23 – Campbell River – Quadra Island	Preparing to enter service	Expected to begin service in 2027
	MV Island K’asa	TBA	TBA	23 – Campbell River – Quadra Island	Under Construction	Expected to begin service in 2027

== Construction and service history ==
The first two vessels were announced in 2017 and launched in March 2019. All vessels were built by Damen Shipyards Galați for a combined cost of $86.5 million. Construction was completed in July, and the vessels were loaded on board a semi-submersible transport ship for the two-month crossing from Romania to Canada. They were delivered in Victoria, British Columbia, on January 18, 2020. On February 19, the vessels were christened and named Island Discovery and Island Aurora. They entered service that same year, June 10 on the Powell River – Texada Island route, and June 18 on the Alert Bay – Port McNeill – Sointula route respectively.

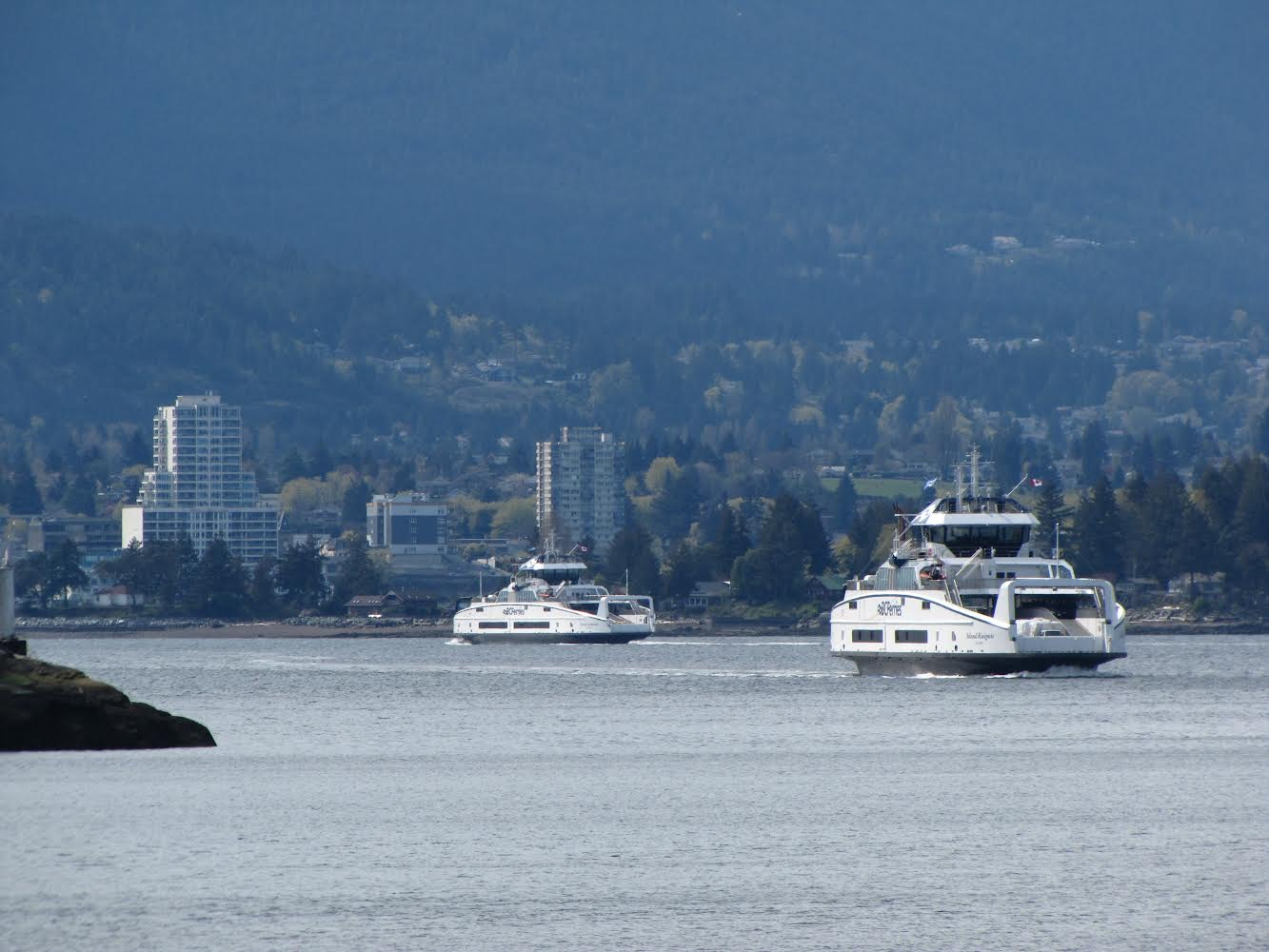
Island Kwigwis and Island Gwawis

On November 6, 2019, BC Ferries ordered four more of the vessels, which were all due to enter service in 2022. The contract for the four new vessels was again awarded to Damen, for $200 million. Each vessel in this phase made the transatlantic voyage under its own power and a temporary name. All four vessels were later named in the Kwakwaka'wakw indigenous language, replacing their temporary numbered name. Island 3 became Island Nagalis (meaning "dawn on the land") and Island 4 became Island K'ulut'a (meaning "porpoise") on August 23, 2021. Island 5 was revealed and christened as Island Kwigwis (meaning "eagle of the sea") on December 14, 2021. Island 6 marked the completion of the second phase of the Island-class roder, renamed Island G̲wawis (meaning "raven of the sea") on January 11, 2022. Originally, the new vessels were scheduled to enter service in the second quarter of 2022; however, the two vessels slated for the Quadra Island route were tentatively delayed until early 2023 due to lack of available crew. Island Kwigwis and Island G̲wawis entered service and replaced Quinsam on the Gabriola Island route on April 12, 2022. Most of the Island-class vessels underwent sea trials in the Saanich Inlet, near Victoria, and in Baynes Sound before their entry to service, and spent time at both the Point Hope Shipyard and BC Ferries Deas Dock.

The name Island G̲wawis received backlash from Snuneymuxw First Nation on the grounds of discrimination after the vessel, named in another First Nations language, operated through Snuneymuxw territory. The group had been invited to participate in the naming process along with other indigenous groups.

In its first two years of service, the Island Discovery was replaced multiple times by the Island Aurora, Island K'ulut'a, and Island Nagalis on the Powell River – Texada Island route due to mechanical issues. The Island K'ulut'a also spent a brief period of time on the Alert Bay – Port McNeill – Sointula route. In preparation for dual-ship service on both Route 19 (Gabriola Island) and Route 23 (Quadra Island), the Island Aurora conducted test sailings with the primary vessel on the routes. Island G̲wawis also test sailed in tandem with the Quinsam in the days leading up to the new service it would provide.

On December 11, 2023, BC Ferries announced that it has received approval from the Ferry Commissioner to place an order for four additional Island-class vessels. These vessel are slated to begin operation in 2027 and will serve the Nanaimo – Gabriola Island and the Campbell River – Quadra Island routes. These vessels will also serve as relief vessels and can supplement the existing Island-class vessels to boost capacity on high-demand routes. When the new vessels are launched, there will be ten Island-class vessels in total, making this class the largest in BC Ferries' fleet. In January 2024, BC Ferries announced that it had awarded the contract to build the four new vessels to Damen Shipyards, who had built the existing six. The price for the contract was not made public at the time. No Canadian shipyard applied for the bid. On July 16, 2024, BC Ferries announced the beginning of steel cutting for the first of the four new vessels at Damen Shipyards Galați. On May 22, 2025, the first of the four new battery-equipped diesel-hybrid vessels was launched.

On November 25, 2025, the four upcoming vessels were gifted their names: The first two vessels were named by the Snuneymuxw First Nation, and the latter two were named by the We Wai Kai and Wei Wai Kum First Nations. The announcement also clarified that the first two vessels are destined for Route 23, and the latter two for route 19.
