= Island G̲wawis =

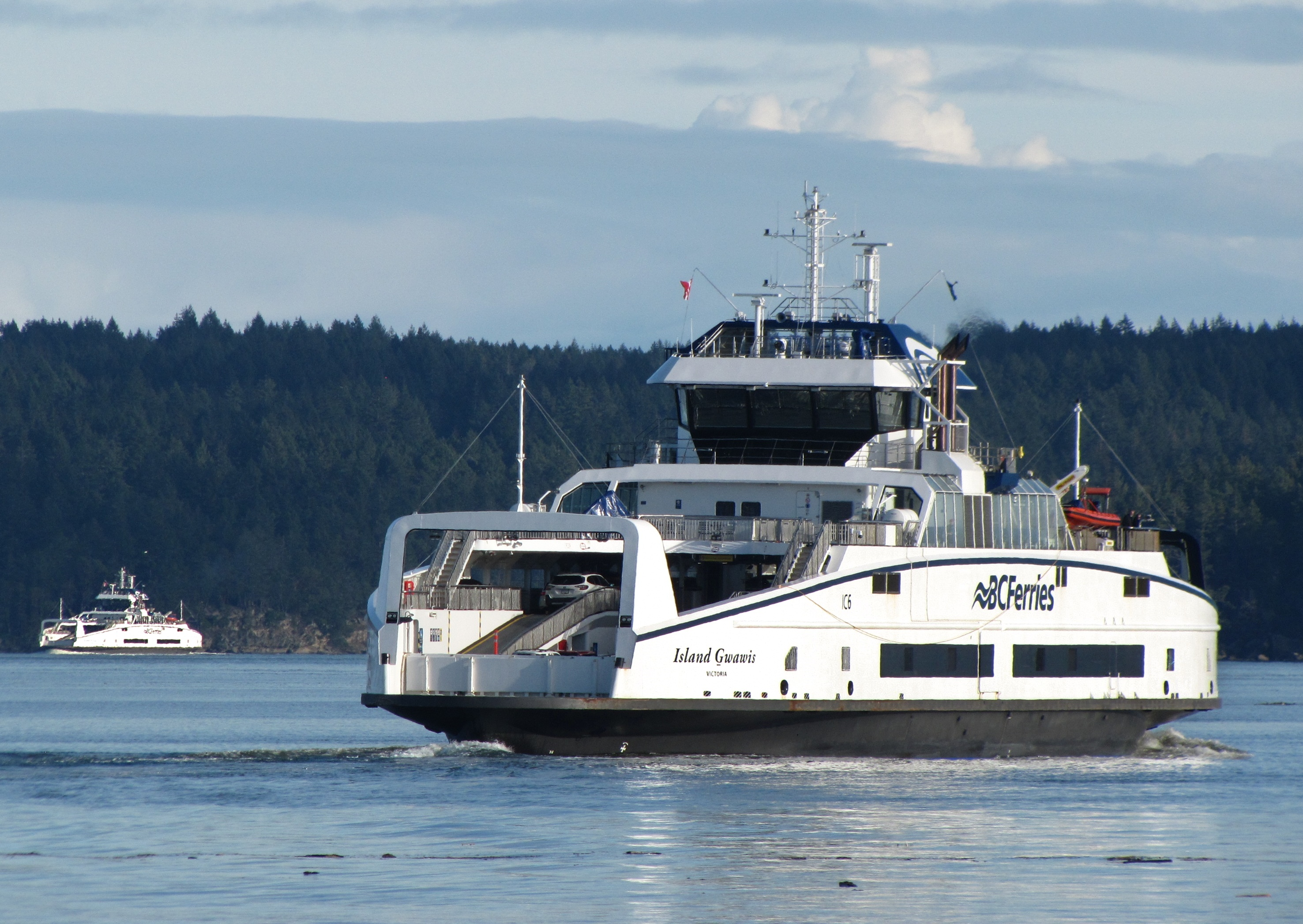
- Island G̲wawis in Nanaimo Harbour

History

Canada
- Name: Island G̲wawis
- Owner: BC Ferries
- Operator: BC Ferries
- Route: Nanaimo Harbour ↔ Gabriola Island
- Builder: Damen Shipyards Galați
- Launched: 22 April 2021
- Christened: 11 January 2022
- In service: 12 April 2022
- Home port: Victoria
- Identification: IMO number: 9900605; MMSI number: 316047946; Callsign: CFA3565

General characteristics
- Type: Island-class ferry
- Tonnage: 1458.59
- Displacement: 1431 tonnes
- Length: 80.80 m (265 ft 1 in)
- Beam: 17.00 m (55 ft 9 in)
- Draft: 3.35 m (11 ft 0 in)
- Depth: 5.70 m (18 ft 8 in)
- Installed power: 2,601 hp (1,940 kW)
- Speed: 14 knots (26 km/h)
- Capacity: 390 passengers; 47 cars
- Crew: 7

Island G̲wawis is the sixth ferry in the Island class, owned and operated by BC Ferries. Built by Damen Shipyards in 2021, this vessel is part of the second phase of Island-class vessels. Island G̲wawis was launched as Island 6 on April 22, 2021, left Galați, Romania, on October 13, 2021, and arrived at Point Hope Shipyard in Victoria, British Columbia, on December 23, 2021. On January 11, 2022, Island 6 was christened and renamed Island G̲wawis by the BC Ferries director of fleet operations and strategy and First People's Cultural Council Special Advisor Cathi Charles Wherry. G̲wawis means 'raven of the sea' in the Kwakʼwala language of the Kwakwakaʼwakw Indigenous peoples.

== Naming controversy ==
The name Island G̲wawis received backlash from Snuneymuxw First Nation. On the day after the name was released, Chief Mike Wyse issued a statement saying that he was "saddened and frustrated" that the ferry company "decided to choose a racist and discriminatory path riddled with colonial acts that is woefully inflammatory and offensive to building a relationship between" them and BC Ferries. The Indigenous group believed that the vessel should have been named in the Snuneymuxw language, as the ferry would be sailing in their traditional waters. BC Ferries noted that vessels are no longer named by their service regions, and are standardized, likely to be moved around the fleet when needed.

== Service history ==
Island G̲wawis entered service with her sister ship Island Kwigwis on April 12, 2022, replacing Quinsam on the Nanaimo-Gabriola Island route. The vessel overnights next to the Nanaimo Harbour ferry terminal.
