= N-class ferry =

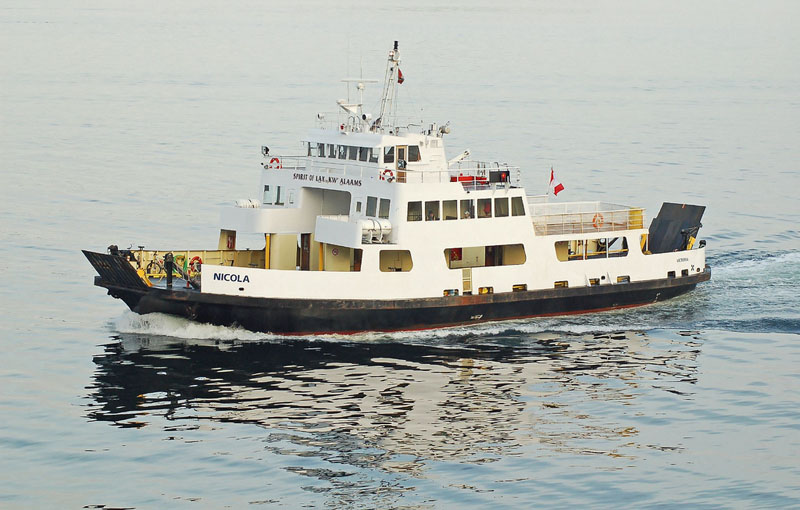
- MV Nicola

Class overview
- Name: N class
- Operators: BC Ferries, Lax Kw'alaams First Nations, Rainy Day Logging
- Built: 1960-1973
- Completed: 4
- Active: 1

N-class ferries are a class of RORO ferries, of which one remaining example is owned by BC Ferries and has the distinction of being the smallest vessel in their fleet.

The N class consists of four vessels:

MV Nimpkish, sold to Mike Buttle Services in 2019 and renamed Mid Coaster.
Built: Vancouver BC
Launched: 1973
Vehicle capacity: 16
Passenger Capacity: 133
Length: 33.53 metres (110.0 ft)
Gross Tons: 371
Service Speed: 11 knots
Horsepower: 680

MV Nicola, (also known as Spirit of Lax Kw' Alaams) owned by BC Ferries, but operated by Lax Kw'alaams First Nations.
Built: Vancouver BC
Launched: 1960
Vehicle capacity: 16
Passenger Capacity: 133
Length: 34.8 metres (114 ft)
Gross Tons: 256.34
Service Speed: 10 knots
Horsepower: 680

MV Albert J Savoie, sold to Rainy Day Logging in 2002.
Built: Vancouver BC
Launched: 1961
Vehicle capacity: 16
Passenger Capacity: 133
Length: 34.8 metres (114 ft)
Gross Tons: 256.34
Service Speed: 10 knots
Horsepower: 680

MV Garibaldi II, sold to Harbour Cruises via Woodfibre Pulp Mill in 2006.
Built: Vancouver BC
Launched: 1964
Vehicle capacity: 16, later reduced to 7
Passenger Capacity: Originally 133, later increased to 332
Length: 33.53 metres (110.0 ft)
Gross Tons: 371
Service Speed: 10 knots
Horsepower: 680
