= B.C. Ferry Authority =

The B.C. Ferry Authority is a no-share capital corporation, established in April 2003 by the government of British Columbia. It is an independent, no-share capital corporation that holds the single issued voting share of the new BC Ferries, which was also established in April 2003. Both of these companies are meant to reform the delivery of ferry transportation services in British Columbia.

B.C. Ferry Authority has a principal objective of oversighting BC Ferries and to appoint its board of directors. While the current structure claims to ensure the operations of BC Ferries are independent from the provincial government, governance includes local politicians and provincial politicians have interfered with management decisions. A government commission is involved with setting of fares.
