= Westview ferry terminal =

Ferry port in British Columbia

Westview
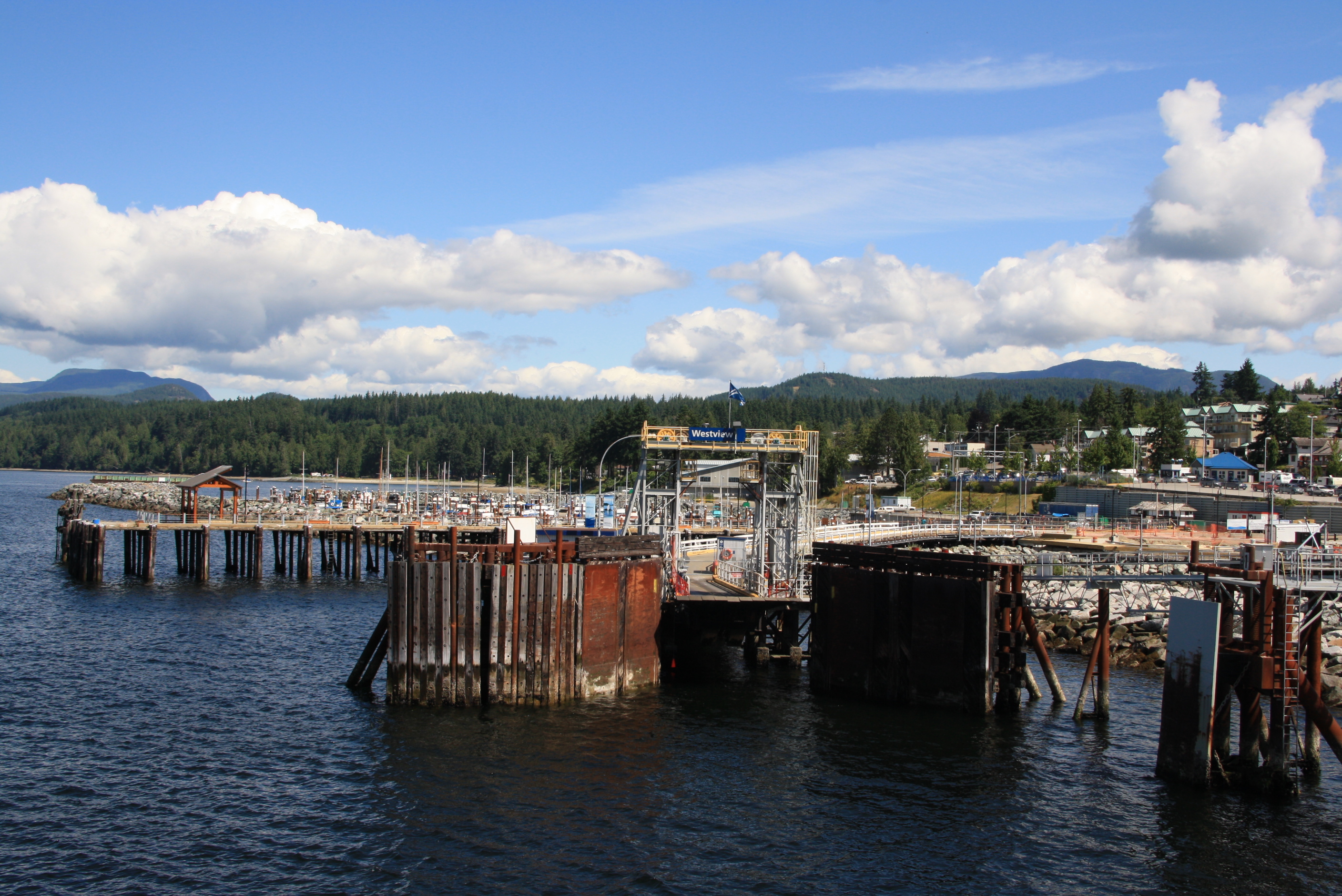
- Westview ferry terminal seen from the sea.

General information
- Location: 4465 Willingdon Ave, Powell River, British Columbia
- Coordinates: 49°50′09″N 124°31′49″W
- System: Ferry terminal
- Owner: BC Ferries
- Operator: BC Ferries
- Lines: Route 17–Comox; Route 18–Texada Island

Other information
- Station code: POWR
- Website: Powell River (Westview)

Passengers
- 2022: 293 551 (Note: Figures obtained for 2021 & 2022 from adding the passengers counted at Westview from the routes 17 and 18 in each month of the calendar year. The figures under "Total Prev Year" are not used because those denote fiscal years instead of calendar years. The total passenger count at Westview for 2021 is 250 693. Only statistics denoting "passenger" traffic is counted; it is unclear whether passengers from vehicles are included in this statistic. The significant percentage increase from 2021 to 2022 is due to reduced 2021 passenger traffic from the COVID-19 pandemic.) ▲17.1%
Location

Westview is a ferry terminal in Powell River, British Columbia, Canada. It is located on Malaspina Strait, part of the Strait of Georgia, on the northern Sunshine Coast and provides connections to Texada Island and Vancouver Island. The ferry port is connected to Highway 101 via a short access road.

== Routes ==
BC Ferries (British Columbia Ferry Services Inc.), the main operator of ferry services on the west coast of British Columbia, operates the following routes:

- Route 17 – Powell River (via Westview) to Comox (via Little River)
- Route 18 – Powell River (via Westview) to Texada Island (via Blubber Bay)
