= MV Nicola (1960) =

Canadian ferry built in 1960

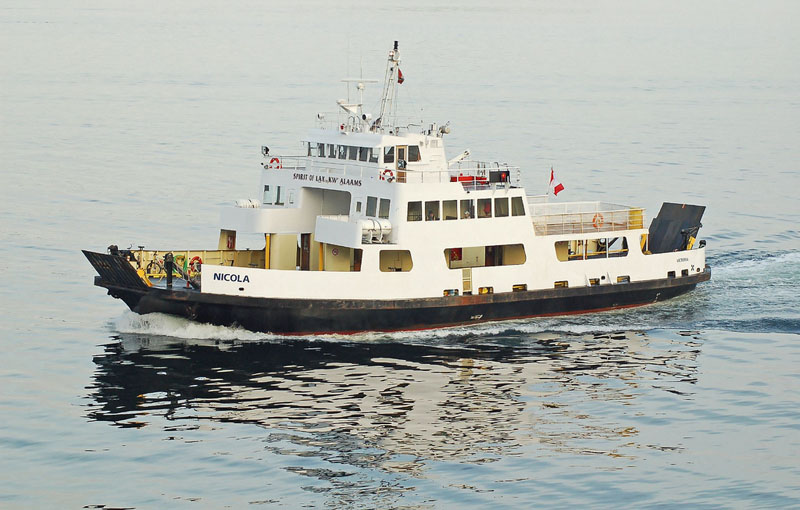

History

Canada
- Name: Quadra Queen
- Owner: Ministry of Highways
- Operator: Ministry of Highways
- Builder: Allied Shipbuilders Ltd., Vancouver
- Cost: $165,270
- Completed: 1960
- Renamed: Cortes Queen, Nicola

Canada
- Name: Nicola
- Namesake: Chief Nicola
- Owner: British Columbia Ferry Services Inc.
- Operator: British Columbia Ferry Services Inc.
- Status: operation transferred to Lax Kw'alaams

Canada
- Name: Spirit of Lax Kw'alaams
- Namesake: Lax Kw'alaams, British Columbia
- Owner: British Columbia Ferry Services Inc.
- Operator: Lax Kw'alaams First Nations community
- Route: Prince Rupert to Lax Kw'alaams
- Identification: IMO number: 5287744; MMSI number: 316012834; Callsign: VCNN
- Status: ship in active service

General characteristics
- Class & type: N-class RORO ferry
- Tonnage: 256.34
- Length: 33.8 m (110.9 ft)
- Installed power: 680 hp (510 kW)
- Speed: 10 knots (19 km/h; 12 mph)
- Capacity: 133 passengers; 16 cars

MV Nicola is an N-class ferry, owned, but not operated by BC Ferries. It is also known as Spirit of Lax Kw' Alaams, a British Columbia First Nations name. Spirit of Lax Kw' Alaams currently runs between Prince Rupert and Port Simpson, (also known as Lax Kw'alaams) a British Columbia First Nations community on British Columbia's North Coast. Overnight the vessel is kept at the Smit tugboat dock in Prince Rupert Harbour.

In December 2009 Sahar Nassimdoost reported that a new dock was under construction in Prince Rupert for use by Spirit of Lax Kw' Alaams. The BC government report on the project mentions that the new Prince Rupert dock will be near Aero Point and cost CA$2,976,300.00 with an expected completion time of June 2010.

== Statistics ==
- Built: Vancouver BC
- Launched: 1960
- Vehicle capacity: 16
- Passenger Capacity: 133
- Length: 33.8 metres
- Gross Tons: 255
- Service Speed: 10 knots
- Horsepower: 680

== Sister ships ==
- MV Nimpkish
- MV Albert J Savoie

Nicola is the sister ship of MV Nimpkish, it is the smallest ship owned by B.C ferries. But, the Nimpkish was tied as the smallest ship owned by B.C. Feries (BCFS). However, Nimpkish was both owned and operated by BCFS, but was sold in 2020. A second sister ship, MV Albert J Savoie, was sold from BC Ferries to Rainy day Logging during the summer of 2002.
