= Bear Cove ferry terminal =

Ferry terminal in British Columbia, Canada

Bear Cove
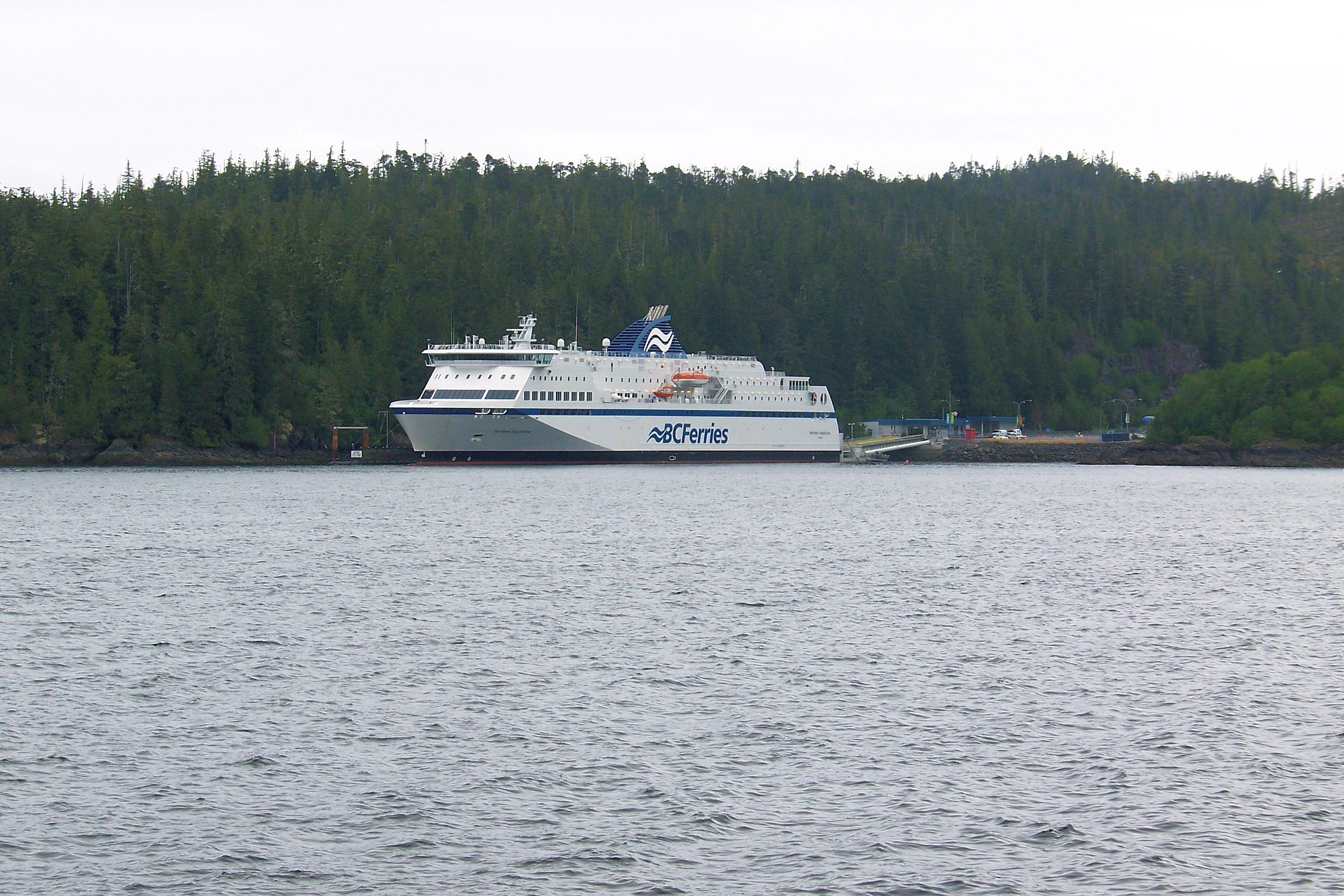
- Bear Cove terminal seen from the sea.

General information
- Location: 6800 Highway 19, Port Hardy; British Columbia; Canada
- Coordinates: 50°43′31.6″N 127°27′21.9″W
- System: Ferry terminal
- Owner: BC Ferries
- Operator: BC Ferries
- Lines: Route 10–Prince Rupert; Route 28–Central Coast Connector (direct summer service); Route 28A–Central Coast Connector

Construction
- Parking: 50

Other information
- Station code: BEAR
- Website: www.bcferries.com/travel-boarding/terminal-directions-parking-food/port-hardy-bear-cove/PPH

History
- Opened: May 1979

Passengers
- 2023: 22 897 (Note: Figures obtained for 2022 & 2023 from adding the passengers counted at Bear Cove in each month of the calendar year. The figures under "Total Prev Year" are not used because those denote fiscal years instead of calendar years. The total passenger count at Bear Cove for 2022 was 22 253.) ▲2.89%
Location

Bear Cove is a northern Vancouver Island ferry port in British Columbia, Canada. The location on the Queen Charlotte Strait, near the district municipality of Port Hardy in the Regional District of Mount Waddington, provides connections to British Columbia's Central and Northern coasts. The tidal range of the Queen Charlotte Strait is normally between 2 and 6 metres (7–20 ft). The ferry terminal is the northern terminus of Highway 19.

== Construction ==
In 1979, the new $2.5M new terminal opened. The relocation from Kelsey Bay reduced the Prince Rupert run by four hours.

== Routes ==
BC Ferries (British Columbia Ferry Services Inc.), the main provider of BC coastal ferry services, operates the following routes:

- Route 10 – Inside Passage: Port Hardy to Prince Rupert.
- Route 28 – Central Coast Connector (direct summer service): Port Hardy to Bella Coola.
- Route 28A – Central Coast Connector: Port Hardy to Bella Coola (with stops at Bella Bella, Shearwater, Klemtu, and Ocean Falls).

== See also ==
- Inside Passage
