= Penrose Island Marine Provincial Park =

Canadian provincial park

- IUCN category II (national park)
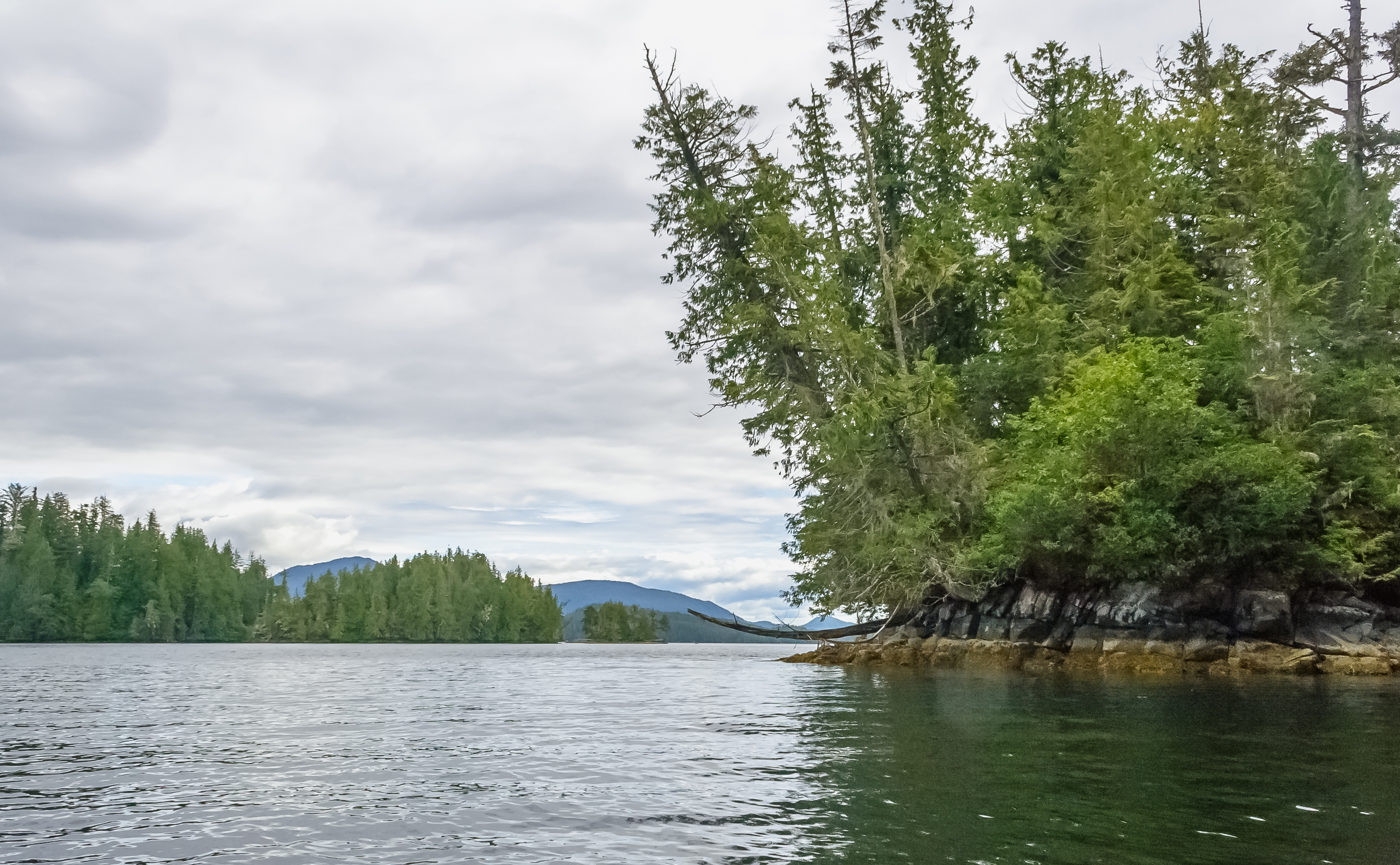
- Part of the eastern shoreline of Penrose Island

- Location within British Columbia
- Interactive map of Penrose Island Marine Provincial Park
- Location: Central Coast RD, British Columbia
- Nearest city: Bella Bella
- Coordinates: 51°27′40″N 127°44′00″W
- Area: 2,013 ha (7.77 sq mi)
- Created: 16 September 1992
- Governing body: BC Parks

Penrose Island Marine Provincial Park is a provincial park in the Central Coast region of British Columbia, Canada, located on the north side of the entrance to Rivers Inlet, 86 km north of Port Hardy at the south end of Fitz Hugh Sound. Comprising 1,079 hectares of marine area and 934 hectares of land area, the park is accessible by boat only and entrance to its anchorages are on its eastern side, the western being exposed to the open ocean.

Exploration by dinghy and kayak are popular with visitors, as are nature viewing, scuba diving and exploring the islands many beaches and adjoining islets. The nearest supply centre for fuel and food is at the community of Rivers Inlet.
