= Nanaimo Harbour ferry terminal =

Ferry terminal in Nanaimo, British Columbia, Canada

Nanaimo Harbour

General information
- Location: 160 Front St; Nanaimo, British Columbia; Canada
- Coordinates: 49.16571807861328°N 123.93231964111328°W
- System: Ferry terminal
- Owner: BC Ferries
- Operator: BC Ferries
- Line: Route 19–Descanso Bay

Construction
- Accessible: yes

Other information
- Station code: NANH
- Website: www.bcferries.com/travel-boarding/terminal-directions-parking-food/nanaimo-nanaimo-harbour/NAH

Passengers
- 2023: 446 985 (Note: Figures obtained for 2022 & 2023 from adding the passengers counted at Nanaimo Harbour in each month of the calendar year. The figures under "Total Prev Year" are not used because those denote fiscal years instead of calendar years. The total passenger count at Nanaimo Harbour for 2022 was 412 220.) ▲8.43%
Location

Nanaimo Harbour, often associated with and referred to as the "Gabriola Island Ferry", is a ferry terminal owned and operated by BC Ferries in British Columbia that goes from downtown Nanaimo across the Northumberland Channel to Descanso Bay on Gabriola Island. The route is serviced by two ferries, the MV Island Gwawis and the MV Island Kwigwis, which can hold up to 47 cars and 450 passengers with a total travel time of about 20 to 25 minutes. Electric ferries are scheduled for the route.

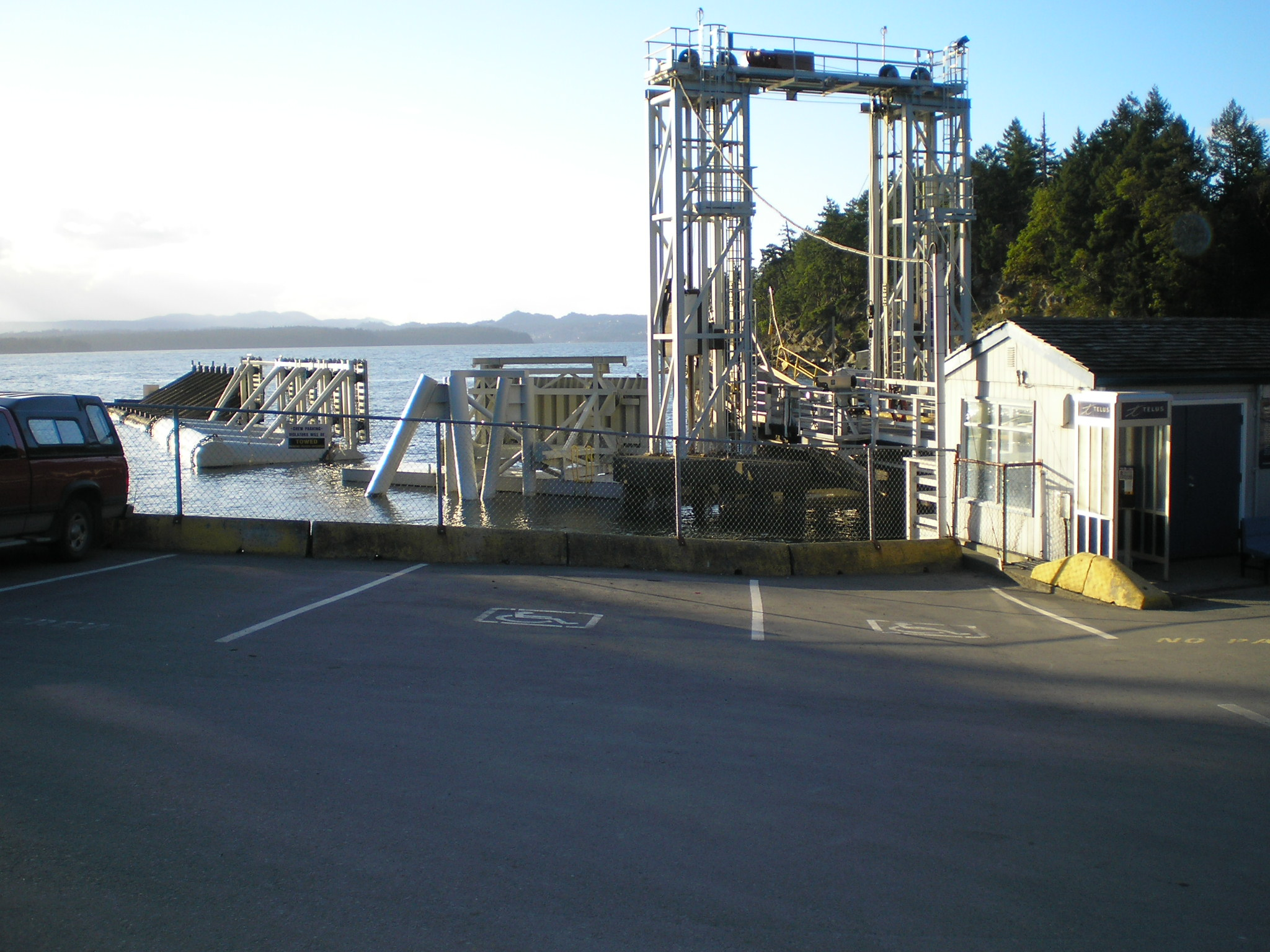
Descanso Bay ferry terminal on Gabriola Island

== Incidents ==
At the Nanaimo terminal, on March 20, 2013 at about 2:20 am, a woman from Gabriola Island drove her van through a barrier gate, onto the docked BC Ferries' ship, and off the other side. The next day, an RCMP dive team were able to recover her body and the van from 40 metres (130 ft) of water.

== See also ==
- Nanaimo Harbour
- Quinitsa
- October Ferry to Gabriola
