= BC Ferries =

Service in British Columbia, Canada

British Columbia Ferry Services Inc.
- Trade name: BC Ferries
- Type: Organized as a privately held company, with the provincial Crown as sole shareholder
- Industry: Transportation
- Founded: Victoria, British Columbia (June 15, 1960)
- Headquarters: Victoria, British Columbia, Canada
- Key people: Cathy McLay, Acting Chair
- Products: Ferry service
- Revenue: ▲ C$769.5 million (2023)
- Operating income: ▲ (7.070) million (2023)
- Net income: ▼ C$1.842 million (2021)
- Owner: BC Ferry Authority (Government of British Columbia)
- Number of employees: 4,500 (2017)
- Website: www.bcferries.com

British Columbia Ferry Services Inc., operating as BC Ferries (BCF), is a former provincial Crown corporation, now operating as an independently managed, publicly owned Canadian company. BC Ferries provides all major passenger and vehicle ferry services for coastal and island communities in the Canadian province of British Columbia. Set up in 1960 to provide a similar service to that provided by the Black Ball Line and the Canadian Pacific Railway, which were affected by job action at the time, BC Ferries has become the largest passenger ferry line in North America, operating a fleet of 41 vessels with a total passenger and crew capacity of over 27,000, serving 47 locations on the B.C. coast.

The federal and provincial governments subsidize BC Ferries to provide agreed service levels on essential links between the BC mainland, coastal islands, and parts of the mainland without road access. The inland ferries operating on British Columbia's rivers and lakes are not run by BC Ferries. The responsibility for their provision rests with the British Columbia Ministry of Transportation and Infrastructure, which contracts operation to various private sector companies.

== Structure ==
At its inception, BC Ferries was a division of the British Columbia Toll Highways and Bridges Authority, a provincial Crown corporation. Through successive reorganizations, it evolved into the British Columbia Ferry Authority and then the British Columbia Ferry Corporation, both of which were also provincial Crown corporations. In 2003, the Government of British Columbia announced that BC Ferries, which had been in debt, would be reorganized into a private corporation, implemented through the passage of the Coastal Ferry Act (Bill 18–2003). The single voting share of BC Ferries Corporation is held by the provincial government's BC Ferry Authority, which operates under the rules of the Act.

== History ==
In the summer of 1958, a strike by employees of CP Steamships and the Black Ball Line caused the Social Credit government of W. A. C. Bennett to decide that the coastal ferry service in British Columbia needed to be government-owned, and so it set about creating BC Ferries. Minister of Highways Phil Gaglardi was tasked with overseeing the new Crown corporation and its rapid expansion.

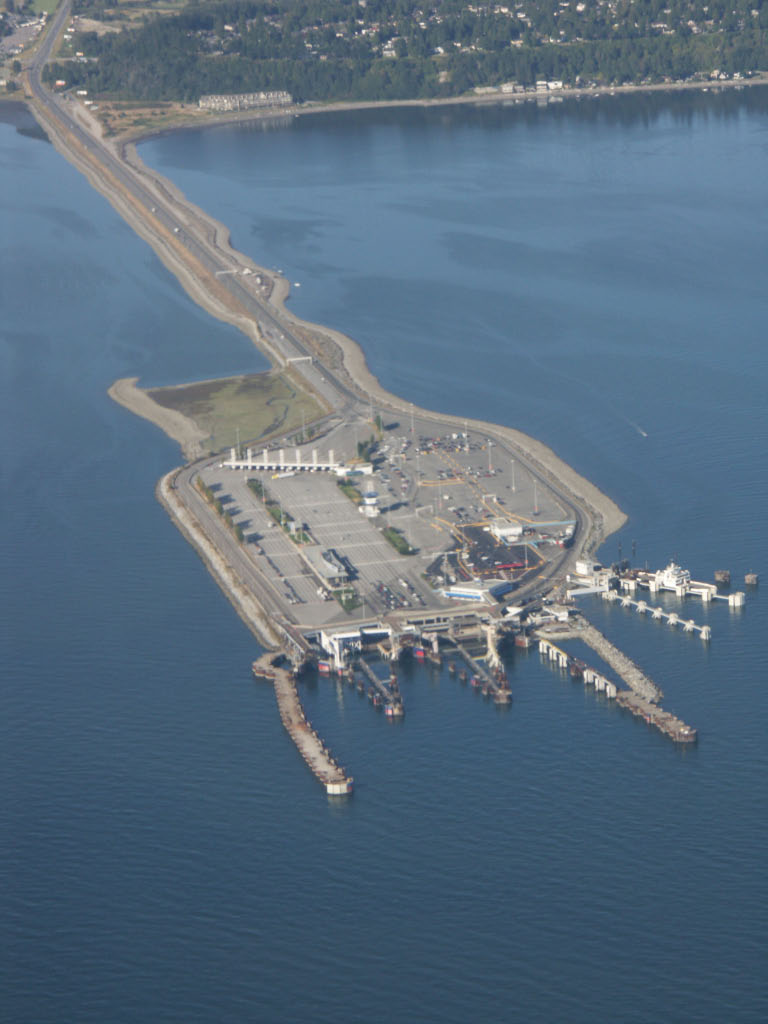
Tsawwassen terminal was constructed by filling in a large area at the end of a causeway in 1960

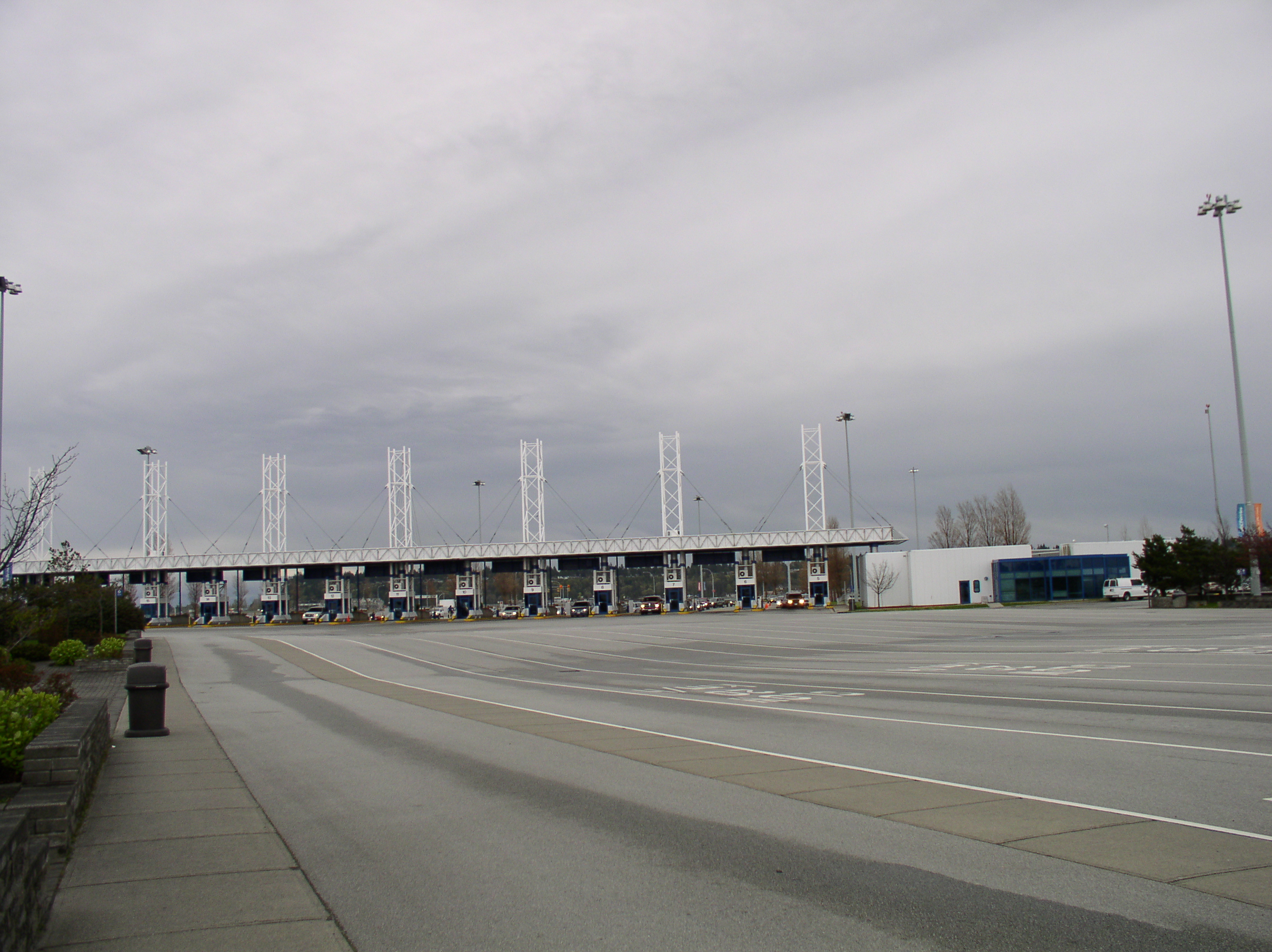
Toll booths at Tsawwassen Terminal

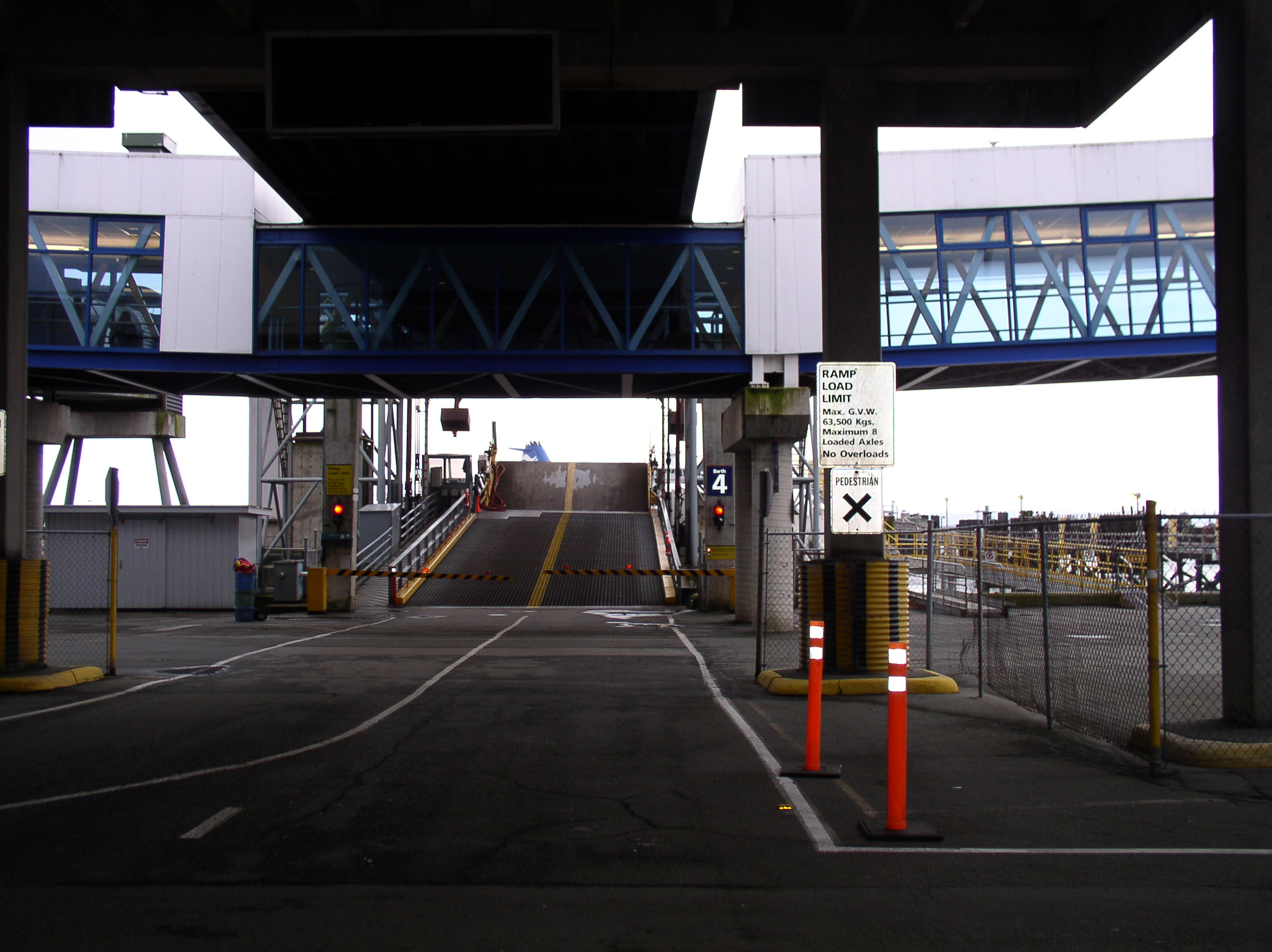
A BC Ferries loading dock (berth 4 at Tsawwassen terminal)

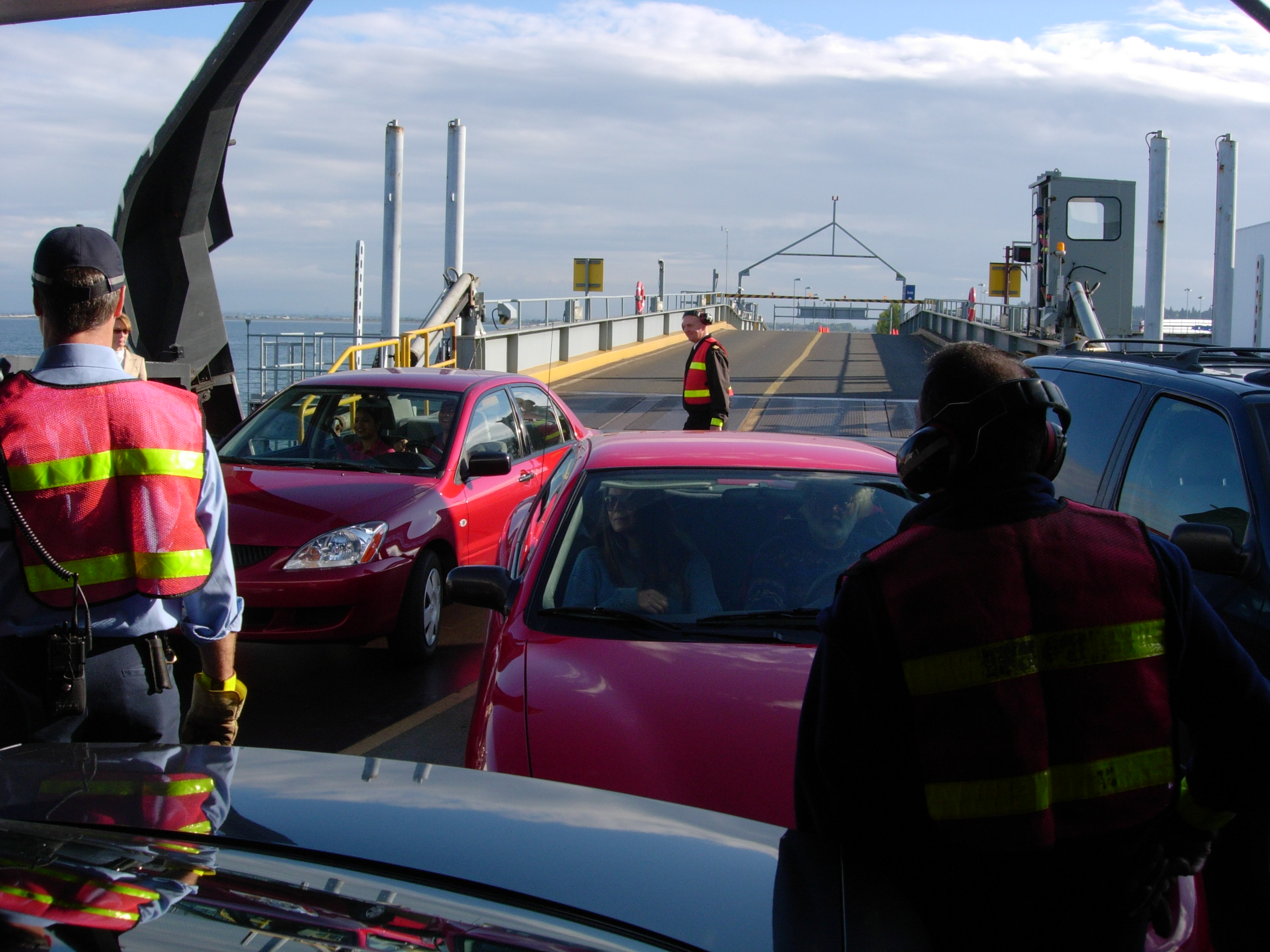
Final loading of cars onto a ferry

BC Ferries' first route, commissioned in 1960, was between Swartz Bay, north of Sidney on Vancouver Island, and Tsawwassen, an area in Delta, using just two vessels. These ships were the now-retired MV Tsawwassen and the MV Sidney. The next few years saw a dramatic growth of the B.C. ferry system as it took over operations of the Black Ball Line and other major private companies providing vehicle ferry service between Vancouver Island and the Lower Mainland. As the ferry system expanded and started to service other small coastal communities, BC Ferries had to build more vessels, many of them in the first five years of its operations, to keep up with the demand. Another method of satisfying increasing demand for service was BC Ferries' unique "stretch and lift" program, involving seven vessels being cut in half and extended, and five of those vessels later cut in half again and elevated, to increase their passenger and vehicle-carrying capacities. The vast majority of the vessels in the fleet were built in B.C. waters, with only two foreign purchases and one domestic purchase. In the mid-1980s, BC Ferries took over the operations of the saltwater branch of the B.C. Ministry of Transportation and Highways, which ran ferry services to very small coastal communities. This action dramatically increased the size of BC Ferries' fleet and its geographical service area. The distinctive "dogwood on green" flag that BC Ferries used between 1960 and 2003 gave the service its popular nickname "the Dogwood Fleet".

During the 1990s, the NDP government commissioned a series of three fast ferries to improve ferry service between the Mainland and Vancouver Island. The vessels proved problematic when they suffered many technical issues, such as causing oversized wakes that destroyed docks, and accelerated shoreline erosion. The fast ferries ended up costing double what was expected. The fast ferries were eventually sold off for $19.4 million in 2003.

A controversy began in July 2004 when BC Ferries, under a new American CEO, announced that the company had disqualified all Canadian bids to build three new Coastal-class ships, and only the proposals from European shipyards were being considered. The contract was estimated at $542 million for the three ships, each designed to carry 370 vehicles and 1600 passengers.

The argument for domestic construction of the ferries was that it would employ numerous British Columbia workers, revitalize the sagging B.C. shipbuilding industry, and entitle the provincial government to a large portion of the cost in the form of taxes. BC Ferries CEO David Hahn claimed that building the ferries in Germany would "save almost $80 million and could lead to lower fares."

On September 17, 2004, BC Ferries awarded the vessel construction contract to Germany's Flensburger shipyard. The contract protected BC Ferries from any delays through a fixed price and fixed schedule contract. Coastal Renaissance entered service in March 2008, while Coastal Inspiration was delivered the same month and entered service in June that year. The third ship, Coastal Celebration, was delivered in June of the same year and entered service in November.

On August 18, 2006, BC Ferries commissioned Flensburger to build a new vessel for its Inside Passage route, with the contract having many of the same types of terms as that for the Coastal-class vessels. The new northern service vessel, Northern Expedition, was delivered in March 2008, and entered service in May of the same year.

On August 26, 2012, BC Ferries announced that it would be cutting 98 round trips on its major routes starting in the fall and winter of 2012 as part of a four-year plan to save $1 million on these routes. Service cuts have included the elimination of supplementary sailings on the Swartz Bay–Tsawwassen route, 18 round trips on the Horseshoe Bay–Departure Bay route, and 48 round trips, the largest number of cuts, on the Duke Point–Tsawwassen route, with plans to look for savings on the smaller unprofitable routes in the future.

Free ferry trips for seniors were suspended from April 2014 to April 2018.

In the fall of 2014, BC Ferries announced the addition of three new Intermediate-class ferries to phase out Queen of Burnaby and Queen of Nanaimo. These three vessels were to be named the Salish class; Salish Orca, Salish Eagle and Salish Raven. In 2022, Salish Heron, the fourth Salish-class vessel, entered service. All four ferries were designed and built by Remontowa Shipbuilding S.A. in Gdansk, Poland, and are dual-fuel, capable of operating on liquefied natural gas and marine diesel. These vessels are a part of BC Ferries standardized fleet plan, which will take the number of ship classes in the BC Ferries fleet from 17 to 5. The proposed replacement classes are Northern, Salish, Shuttle, Summit, and Island. Additionally, there will still be three unique (unclassed) vessels in the fleet after standardization is complete. BC Ferries has stated, however, that this total standardization of the fleet will not be achieved for another 40 years. As of March 2024, the fleet has so far been reduced to 11 classes of vessels, with 5 unique (unclassed) vessels remaining as well.

In August 2022, BC Ferries announced plans to launch an official mobile application. The app was released in March 2023.

== Financial results ==
Year End	Operating Revenue ($M)	Operating Earnings ($M)	Service Fees (Ferry Tspt.) ($M)	Other Govt. Subsidies ($M)	Net Regulatory Earnings ($M)
2005	422	(4)	92	24	40
2006	436	11	92	25	50
2007	452	7	91	25	49
2008	481	8	104	26	37
2009	523	21	103	26	9
2010	549	35	126	27	3
2011	557	30	125	27	4
2012	555	25	127	27	(16)
2013	571	47	149	28	15
2014	594	62	144	28	25
2015	620	82	148	28	41
2016	673	99	144	29	65
2017	697	113	155	29	88
2018	735	104	159	30	71
2019	712	65	188	31	57
2020	707	33	198	31	22
2021	460	(146)	194	218	22

== Current routes ==
Route numbers are used internally by BC Ferries only. All routes except Route 13 and the Unregulated routes carry vehicles. Route assignments current as of May 21, 2026.

Official routes
Route number	Route name/Location	Highway carried	Origin	Destination(s)	Crossing Time	Primary Vessel(s)	Notes
1	Georgia Strait South	Highway 17	Victoria (via Swartz Bay, on Vancouver Island)	Vancouver (via Tsawwassen)	1 hour and 35 minutes	MV Coastal Celebration; MV Queen of New Westminster; MV Spirit of British Columbia; MV Spirit of Vancouver Island	—
2	Georgia Strait Central	Highway 1	Nanaimo (via Departure Bay, on Vancouver Island)	Vancouver (via Horseshoe Bay)	1 hour and 40 minutes	MV Queen of Cowichan; MV Queen of Oak Bay	—
3	Howe Sound - Mainland	Highway 101	Vancouver (via Horseshoe Bay)	Sunshine Coast (via Langdale)	40 minutes	MV Queen of Coquitlam; MV Queen of Surrey	—
4	Satellite Channel	—	Victoria (via Swartz Bay, on Vancouver Island)	Salt Spring Island (via Fulford Harbour)	35 minutes	MV Skeena Queen	—
5/5A	Swanson Channel	—	Victoria (via Swartz Bay, on Vancouver Island)	Southern Gulf Islands - Galiano Island (via Sturdies Bay), Mayne Island (via Village Bay), (North) Pender Island (via Otter Bay), and Saturna Island (via Lyall Harbour)	Varies	MV Queen of Cumberland (5A); MV Salish Raven (5)	Circle route.
6	South Stuart Channel	—	Crofton (on Vancouver Island)	Salt Spring Island (via Vesuvius Bay)	20 minutes	MV Quinsam; MV Island G̲wawis (upcoming); MV Island K'ulut'a (upcoming)	—
7	Jervis Inlet - Sunshine Coast	Highway 101	Sunshine Coast (via Earls Cove)	Powell River (via Saltery Bay)	50 minutes	MV Malaspina Sky	—
8	Queen Charlotte Channel	—	Vancouver (via Horseshoe Bay)	Bowen Island (via Snug Cove)	20 minutes	MV Queen of Capilano	—
9/9A	Active Pass Shuttle	—	Vancouver (via Tsawwassen)	Southern Gulf Islands - Galiano Island (via Sturdies Bay), Mayne Island (via Village Bay), (North) Pender Island (via Otter Bay), Saturna Island (via Lyall Harbour), and Salt Spring Island (via Long Harbour)	Varies	MV Salish Eagle (9); MV Salish Heron (9A)	Circle route.
10	Inside Passage	Highway 19	Port Hardy (via Bear Cove, on Vancouver Island)	Prince Rupert (on Kaien Island)	16 hours	MV Northern Expedition	BC Ferries' longest route.
11	Hecate Strait	Highway 16	Prince Rupert (on Kaien Island)	Haida Gwaii (via Skidegate, on Graham Island)	6 hours and 30 minutes - 8 hours	MV Northern Adventure	—
12	Saanich Inlet - Vancouver Island	—	Brentwood Bay	Mill Bay	25 minutes	MV Klitsa	—
13	Thornbrough Channel	—	Sunshine Coast (via Langdale)	Gambier Island (via New Brighton) and Keats Island (via Keats Landing and Eastbourne)	Varies	MV Stormaway III; MV Stormaway IV	Operated by Kona Winds Yacht Charters Ltd.
17	Georgia Strait North	—	Comox (via Little River, on Vancouver Island)	Powell River (via Westview)	1 hour and 25 minutes	MV Salish Orca	—
18	Malaspina Strait	—	Powell River (via Westview)	Texada Island (via Blubber Bay)	35 minutes	MV Island Discovery	—
19	Northumberland Channel	—	Nanaimo (via Nanaimo Harbour, on Vancouver Island)	Gabriola Island (via Descanso Bay)	20 minutes	MV Island G̲wawis (auxiliary); MV Island xwsaĺux̌ul; MV Island sarlequun	—
20	North Stuart Channel	—	Chemainus (on Vancouver Island)	Thetis Island (via Preedy Harbour) and Penelakut Island (via Telegraph Habour)	Varies	MV Pune'luxutth	Triangle route.
21	Baynes Sound	—	Buckley Bay (on Vancouver Island)	Denman Island (via Denman Island West)	10 minutes	MV Baynes Sound Connector; MV Kahloke (relief)	BC Ferries' shortest routes.
22	Lambert Channel	—	Denman Island (via Gravelly Bay)	Hornby Island (via Shingle Spit)	10 minutes	MV Quinitsa	BC Ferries' shortest routes.
23	Discovery Passage	—	Campbell River (on Vancouver Island)	Quadra Island (via Quathiaski Cove)	10 minutes	MV Island K'ulut'a; MV Island Kwigwis	BC Ferries' shortest routes.
24	Sutil Channel	—	Quadra Island (via Heriot Bay)	Cortes Island (via Whaletown)	45 minutes	MV Island Nagalis	—
25	Broughton Strait	—	Port McNeill (on Vancouver Island)	Alert Bay (on Cormorant Island) and Sointula (on Malcolm Island)	Varies	MV Island Aurora	Triangle route.
26	Skidegate Inlet - Haida Gwaii	—	Skidegate (on Graham Island)	Alliford Bay (on Moresby Island)	20 minutes	MV Kwuna	—
28	Inside Passage - Central Coast Connector	Highway 19	Port Hardy (via Bear Cove, on Vancouver Island)	Bella Coola	10-12 hours	MV Northern Sea Wolf	Summer only route.
28A	Inside Passage - Central Coast Connector	Highway 19	Port Hardy (via Bear Cove, on Vancouver Island)	Bella Coola with stops at Bella Bella (via McLoughlin Bay, on Campbell Island), Ocean Falls, and Shearwater (on Denny Island)	Varies	MV Northern Sea Wolf	Year-round route.
30	Mid-Island Express	Highway 19	Nanaimo (via Duke Point, on Vancouver Island)	Vancouver (via Tsawwassen)	2 hours	MV Coastal Inspiration; MV Coastal Renaissance; MV Queen of Alberni	—
Unnumbered	Vancouver Island East	Highway 1/Highway 19	Vancouver (via Tsawwassen)	Nanaimo (via Departure Bay, on Vancouver Island)	2 hours	MV Queen of Alberni	Started in summer 2025 as a seasonal once per day, one-way only service. This routing was previously used between December 20, 2011, and May 1, 2012, during a closure of the Duke Point ferry terminal.
Unregulated routes*
Route number	Route Location/Name	Highway carried	Origin	Destination(s)	Crossing Time	Primary Vessel(s)	Notes
25u	Broughton Strait - Water taxi/school trip ferry	—	Port McNeill (on Vancouver Island)	Alert Bay (on Cormorant Island) and Sointula (on Malcolm Island)	Varies	MV Spirit of Yalis	Operated by Pacific Western Marine Ltd.
51	Vancouver Island West	—	Tofino (on Vancouver Island)	Ahousat (on Flores Island) and Hotsprings Cove	Varies	Various vessels	Operated by various water taxi companies
53	Vancouver Island Northwest	—	Gold River	Kyuquot and Tahsis	Varies	MV Uchuck III	Operated by Get West Adventure Cruises
54	Inside Passage	—	Prince Rupert (via Cow Bay, on Kaien Island)	Dodge Cove (on Digby Island)	15 minutes	Various vessels	Operated by West Coast Launch
55	Georgia Strait North-Central	—	French Creek (on Vancouver Island)	Lasqueti Island (via False Bay)	1 hour	MV Centurion VII	Operated by Pacific Western Marine Ltd.
59	Vancouver Island West - Barkley Sound	—	Port Alberni	Bamfield and Kildonan	Varies	MV Frances Barkley	Operated by Lady Rose Marine Services
60	Inside Passage	—	Prince Rupert (on Kaien Island)	Hartley Bay, Kitkatla (on Dolphin Island), Oona River (on Porcher Island), and Metlakatla	Varies	MV Tsimshian Storm	Operated by North Co Corp.
Unnumbered	Inside Passage - Tuck Inlet	—	Prince Rupert (on Kaien Island)	Lax Kwʼalaams (also known as Port Simpson)	40 minutes	MV Spirit of Lax Kw' alaams (MV Nicola)	Operated by the Lax-kw'alaams First Nation community

*Operated by third-party contractors, under the sponsorship of BC Ferries.

=== Maps ===
Numbers in blue circles are ferry route numbers. Provincial highway trailblazers are added where appropriate.

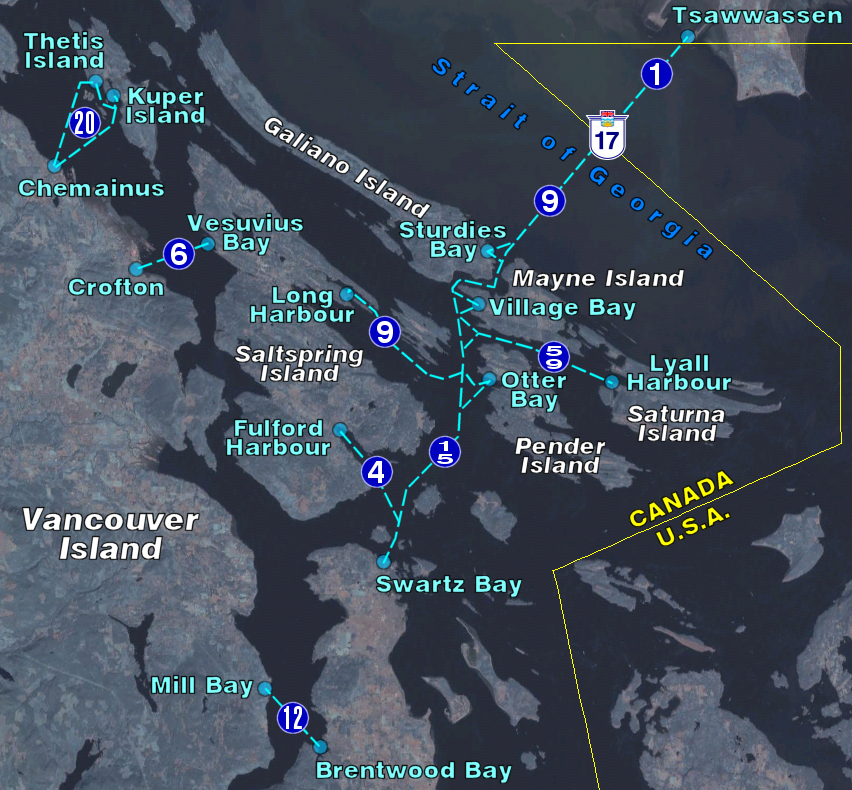
Zone 1 – Southern Gulf Islands

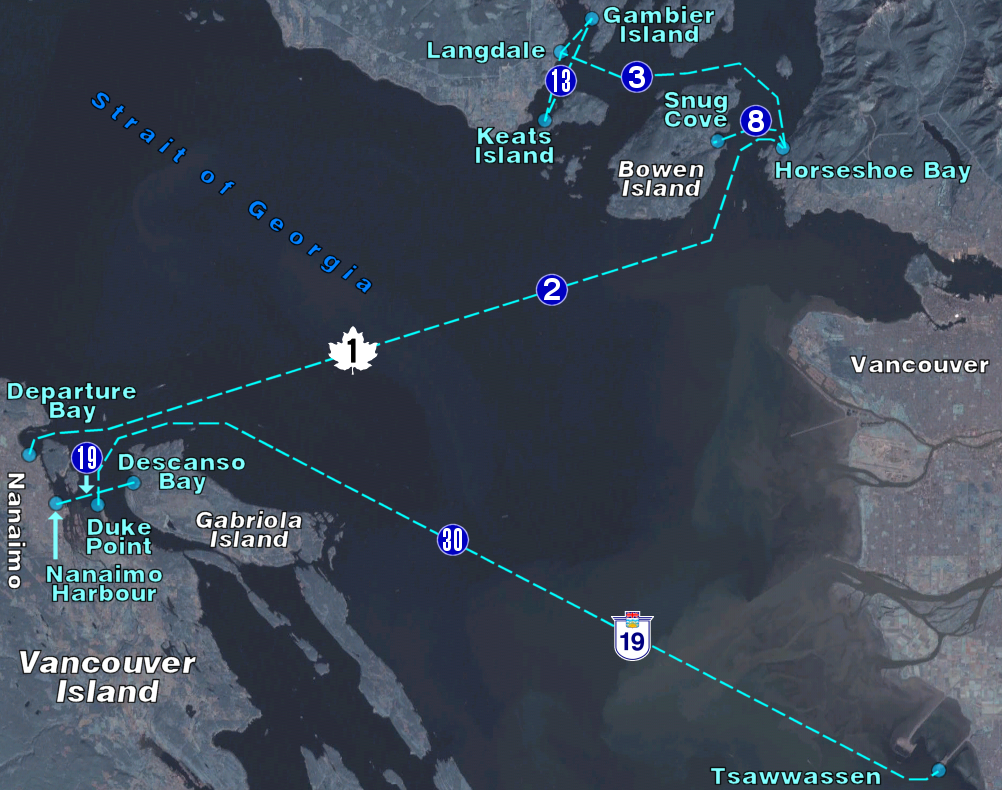
Zone 2 – Central Georgia Strait

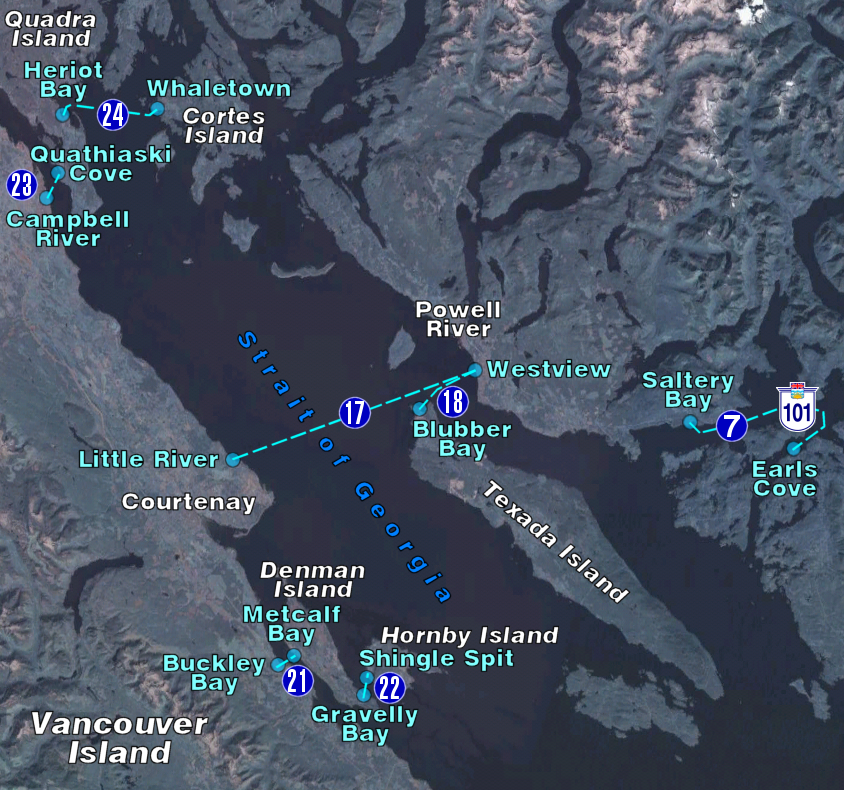
Zone 3 – Northern Georgia Strait

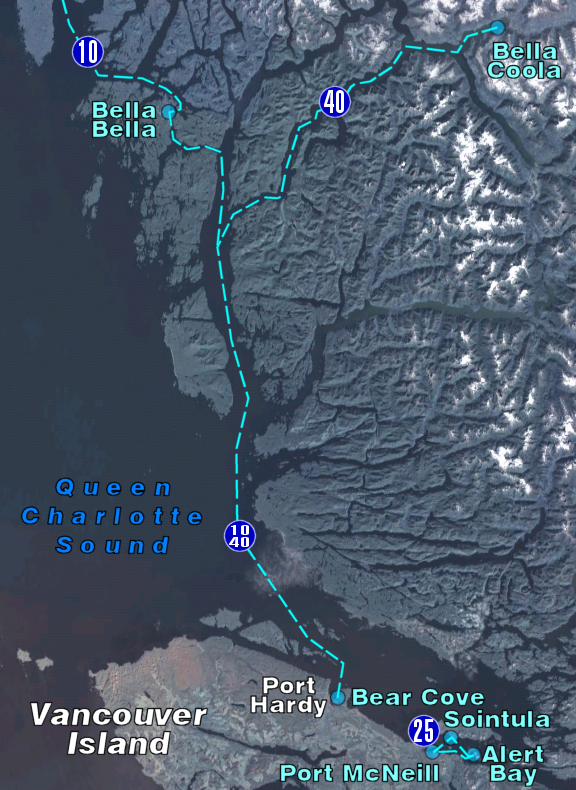
Zone 4 – Queen Charlotte Sound

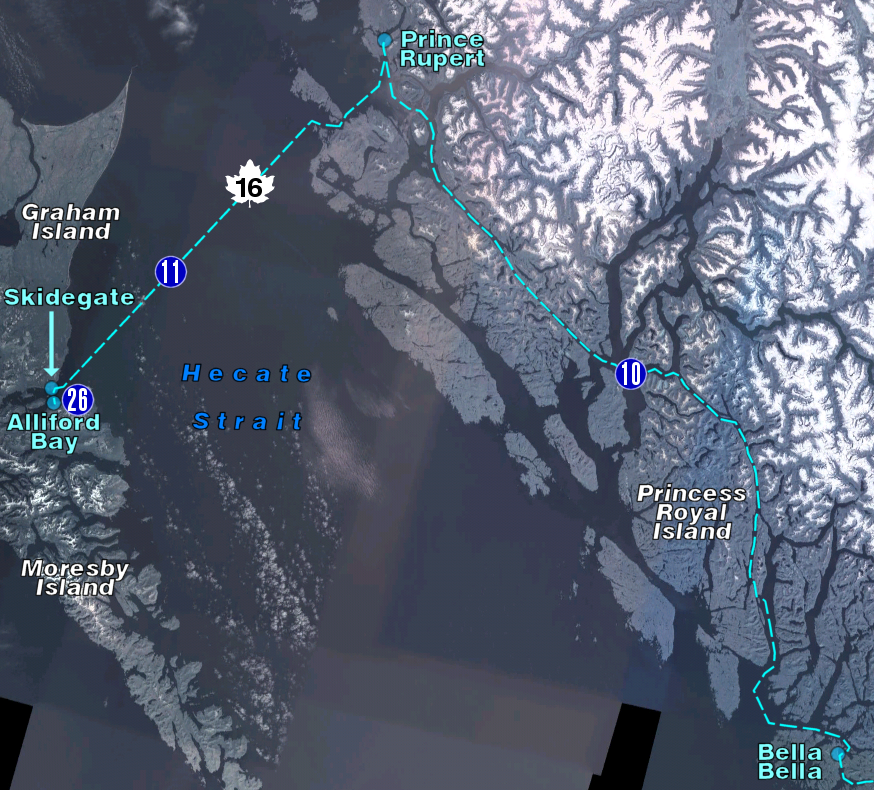
Zone 5 – North Coast

== Former routes ==
Route number	Route Location/Name	Highway carried	Origin	Destination(s)	Crossing Time	Primary Vessel(s)	Notes
10	Inside Passage	—	Kelsey Bay (on Vancouver Island)	Prince Rupert (on Kaien Island)	Unknown	Various vessels	Discontinued due to the extension of Highway 1, later Highway 19, to Port Hardy in 1978. Service was immediately resumed from the Bear Cove ferry terminal.
40	Inside Passage - Discovery Coast Connector	—	Kelsey Bay (on Vancouver Island)	Bella Coola with stops at Bella Bella (via McLoughlin Bay, on Campbell Island), Finn Bay, Hakai Pass (informal), Klemtu (on Swindle Island), Namu, Ocean Falls, and Shearwater (on Denny Island).	Varied	Various vessels	Discontinued due to the extension of Highway 1, later Highway 19, to Port Hardy in 1978. Service was immediately resumed from the Bear Cove ferry terminal, although the stops at Finn Bay, Hakai Pass, and Namu were all discontinued by 1998. This route was later rebranded as Route 28A (see above), and the stop at Klemtu was also later discontinued.
Unknown	Inside Passage	—	Kelsey Bay (on Vancouver Island)	Port Hardy (via Bear Cove, on Vancouver Island),	Unknown	Various vessels	Discontinued due to the extension of Highway 1, later Highway 19, to Port Hardy in 1978.
Unknown	Broughton Strait/Inside Passage	—	Kelsey Bay (on Vancouver Island)	Port Hardy (via Bear Cove, on Vancouver Island), Alert Bay (on Cormorant Island), and Sointula (on Malcolm Island)	Varied	Various vessels	Discontinued due to the extension of Highway 1, later Highway 19, to Port Hardy in 1978. Service to Alert Bay and Sointula began being offered from the Port McNeill ferry terminal on Route 25 in 1975, which continues to this day. (see above).
Unknown	Inside Passage/Vancouver Island East	—	Kelsey Bay (on Vancouver Island)	Vancouver (via Tsawwassen)	Unknown	Various vessels	Discontinued due to the extension of Highway 1, later Highway 19, to Port Hardy in 1978. This routing was used for special trips coinciding with start/end-of-season vessel repositioning runs.
Unknown	Inside Passage/Vancouver Island East	—	Port Hardy (via Bear Cove, on Vancouver Island)	Vancouver (via Tsawwassen)	Unknown	Various vessels	This routing was used for special trips coinciding with start/end-of-season vessel repositioning runs, until 2000.
Unknown	Georgia Strait North/Malaspina Strait	—	Powell River (via Westview)/Comox (via Little River, on Vancouver Island)	Texada Island (via Blubber Bay)	Varied	MV Salish Orca	Commenced on February 19, 2020 as a pilot project, this route provided direct service between Comox and Texada Island via a triangle route that was operated as the first sailing of the day departing Westview on Wednesdays and Saturdays, stopping at Blubber Bay, then continuing on to Little River. The route was run in the inverse direction as the last sailing of the day departing Little River on the same days. The route's operation was temporarily suspended on March 25, 2020, due to the COVID-19 pandemic, and was eventually terminated permanently on November 19, 2022, with BC Ferries citing operating costs as being prohibitive to reinstating the service.

== Fleet ==
BC Ferries has the largest fleet of vehicle ferry vessels in the world. There are at least 45 vessels, ranging from small passenger-only water taxis, up to the 358-car Spirit-class ferries. All of the vessels in use on BC Ferries' official routes are roll-on/roll-off car ferries, with the exception of those assigned to Route 13 and the Unregulated routes (with the exception of the Lax Kwʼalaams route). Most of the major vessels are based on similar designs, which are aggregated into classes of ferries:

- C-class ferry
- Century-class ferry
- Coastal-class ferry
- I-class ferry
- Island-class ferry
- K-class ferry
- N-class ferry
- Q-class ferry
- Salish-class ferry
- Spirit-class ferry
- Unclassed ships of BC Ferries

=== Summit class (new major vessels) ===
In 2018, BC Ferries announced its intention to procure seven new major vessels to replace the five aging C-class ferries and MV Queen of New Westminster (with a net increase of one major vessel). Due to the COVID-19 pandemic, the project was paused temporarily.

In February 2024, Ferries released renderings of the new major vessels, which were designed by Norwegian naval architecture firm LMG Marin. Later that year, in September, it was announced that BC Ferries would prefer to build the seven ferries in two phases and a request for proposal was sent out to "pre-qualified" shipyards to build the first batch – five of the seven vessels. The final two would be built at a later phase. This plan for procurement required final approval from the independent BC Ferries Commissioner, Eva Hage, who approved the purchasing of four – not five – new vessels for the first phase in March 2025. Hage agreed that new vessels will benefit both the province and the ferry system, but she asserted that a fifth vessel would not be in the public's interest due to high costs. Both BC Ferries CEO Nicholas Jimenez and the Greater Victoria Chamber of Commerce expressed their frustrations with this decision, with the latter demanding premier David Eby to do what he can to get a fifth vessel approved, to which Eby expressed sympathy for a fifth vessel; however, Eby noted that both the Commissioner's Office and BC Ferries are independent of the provincial government.

BC Ferries indicated that the request for proposal would be open to all shipbuilders, both Canadian and international; however, in April 2025, Ferries announced that no Canadian shipyards had submitted a bid for the project. BC shipyard Seaspan ULC had previously indicated that building ferries in BC would be impossible due to international competitors, who pay lower wages and have less stringent environmental standards. It also added that it does not currently have the capacity to deliver these new vessels within BC Ferries' timeline, unless the province provides incentives. Seaspan also indicated that it hopes to be a bidder for the second phase. In June 2025, Ferries announced that it had awarded the first phase of the project to Chinese state-owned CMI Weihai Shipyards in Shandong province. This decision drew criticism from many, including from federal transport minister Chrystia Freeland. BC Ferries defended its decision, saying that it was the strongest bid by a "significant margin."

The four vessels are expected to enter service over a three year period, with the first due to join the fleet in 2029, to allow for the retirement of Queen of Alberni. The second and third vessels are due in 2030, to allow for the retirements of Queen of Coquitlam and Queen of New Westminster. The fourth vessel is due in 2031, to allow for the retirement of Queen of Cowichan. Queen of Surrey and Queen of Oak Bay will be refitted to extend their lifespans until at least 2036, when they will retire upon the fifth and sixth new major vessels entering revenue service.

In May 2026, BC Ferries announced that the new vessels will be designated the Summit class, with each vessel named after trees found around the province: Summit Arbutus, Summit Cedar, Summit Maple and Summit Spruce. Jimenez stated that the names were inspired by British Columbia's natural environment, and were chosen after consulting employees and a group of stakeholders.

== See also ==
=== Other ferry services operating in BC ===
- List of inland ferries in British Columbia
- Black Ball Line

=== Ferry services elsewhere ===
- Alaska Marine Highway – Alaska's Marine Highway System, similar to BC Ferries. Also serves Prince Rupert.
- Inter-Island Ferry Authority – An American analogue of BC Ferries.
- Marine Atlantic – An east-coast analogue of BC Ferries.
- Washington State Ferries – An American analogue of BC Ferries.
- Baja Ferries – A Mexican analogue of BC Ferries

=== Shipyards ===
- Allied Shipbuilders Ltd.
- Burrard Dry Dock
- Vancouver Shipyard
- Victoria Machinery Depot
- Washington Marine Group – Originally called the Vancouver Shipyards Co. Ltd.
- Yarrow Shipbuilders
- Damen Shipyard
