= Port Hardy =

- District municipality
- District of Port Hardy
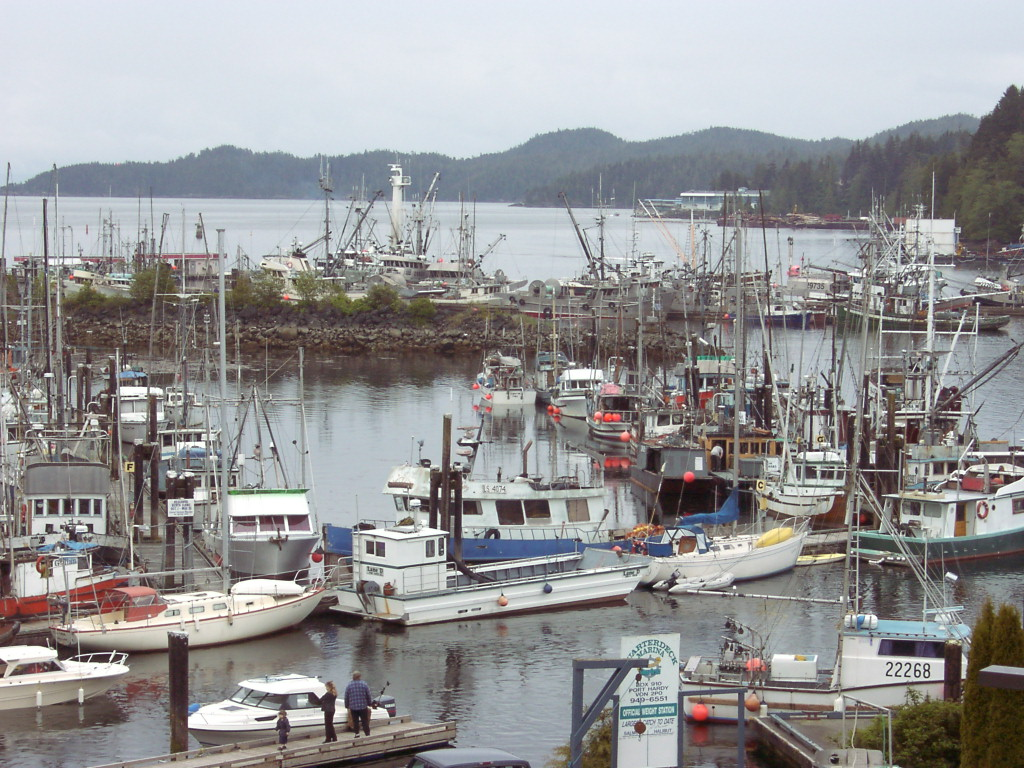
- Harbour of Port Hardy

- Location within Vancouver Island Location within British Columbia Location within Canada
- Coordinates: 50°43′28″N 127°29′53″W
- Country: Canada
- Province: British Columbia
- Region: North-Island
- Regional District: Mount Waddington
- Incorporated: April 5, 1966

Government
  - Mayor: Pat Corbett-Labatt

Area
  - Land: 38.55 km^{2} (14.88 sq mi)
- Elevation: 23 m (75 ft)

Population (2021)
  - Total: 3,902
  - Density: 101.2/km^{2} (262/sq mi)
- Time zone: UTC−07:00 (PT)
- Postal code: V0N
- Area codes: 250, 778
- Climate: Cfb
- Website: porthardy.ca

Port Hardy is a district municipality in British Columbia, Canada located on the north-east tip of Vancouver Island. Port Hardy has a population of 3,902 as of the 2021 census.

It is the gateway to Cape Scott Provincial Park, the North Coast Trail and the BC Marine Trail, located on the northernmost tip of Vancouver Island. The community has access to various outdoor activities, such as kayaking, caving, scuba diving, nature viewing, surfing, saltwater rapids, fishing and camping.

Port Hardy's twin city is Numata, Japan.

== Name ==
Port Hardy was named after Vice-Admiral Sir Thomas Masterman Hardy, who served as the captain of HMS Victory. He served at the Battle of Trafalgar when Horatio Nelson died in his arms.

== Demographics ==
In the 2021 Census of Population conducted by Statistics Canada, Port Hardy had a population of 3,902 living in 1,791 of its 1,984 total private dwellings, a change of −5.6% from its 2016 population of 4,132. With a land area of 38.55 km^{2} (14.88 sq mi), it had a population density of 101.2/km^{2} (262.2/sq mi) in 2021.

=== Religion ===
According to the 2021 census, religious groups in Port Hardy included:

- Irreligion (2,715 persons or 70.3%)
- Christianity (995 persons or 25.8%)
- Sikhism (40 persons or 1.0%)
- Buddhism (25 persons or 0.6%)
- Judaism (15 persons or 0.4%)
- Islam (15 persons or 0.4%)
- Indigenous Spirituality (10 persons or 0.3%)
- Other (40 persons or 1.0%)

=== Ethnicity ===
Panethnic groups in the District of Port Hardy (1986−2021)
Panethnic group	2021		2016		2011		2006		2001		1996		1991		1986	
Panethnic group	Pop.	%	Pop.	%	Pop.	%	Pop.	%	Pop.	%	Pop.	%	Pop.	%	Pop.	%
European (Note: Statistic includes all persons that did not make up part of a visible minority or an indigenous identity.)	2,785	72.15%	2,820	69.12%	3,015	76.23%	3,115	81.76%	3,965	86.95%	4,680	88.64%	4,395	86.6%	4,575	84.96%
Indigenous	800	20.73%	1,055	25.86%	700	17.7%	485	12.73%	460	10.09%	300	5.68%	460	9.06%	415	7.71%
Southeast Asian (Note: Statistic includes total responses of "Filipino" and "Southeast Asian" under visible minority section on census.)	80	2.07%	50	1.23%	60	1.52%	35	0.92%	20	0.44%	105	1.99%	25	0.49%	35	0.65%
East Asian (Note: Statistic includes total responses of "Chinese", "Korean", and "Japanese" under visible minority section on census.)	75	1.94%	85	2.08%	10	0.25%	65	1.71%	60	1.32%	90	1.7%	70	1.38%	105	1.95%
South Asian	40	1.04%	15	0.37%	35	0.88%	30	0.79%	20	0.44%	40	0.76%	85	1.67%	180	3.34%
African	25	0.65%	25	0.61%	15	0.38%	15	0.39%	0	0%	25	0.47%	0	0%	30	0.56%
Latin American	15	0.39%	15	0.37%	60	1.52%	25	0.66%	0	0%	20	0.38%	30	0.59%	45	0.84%
Middle Eastern (Note: Statistic includes total responses of "West Asian" and "Arab" under visible minority section on census.)	0	0%	0	0%	0	0%	25	0.66%	0	0%	0	0%	10	0.2%	0	0%
Other/multiracial (Note: Statistic includes total responses of "Visible minority, n.i.e." and "Multiple visible minorities" under visible minority section on census.)	0	0%	10	0.25%	45	1.14%	10	0.26%	35	0.77%	0	0%	—N/a	—N/a	—N/a	—N/a
Total responses	3,860	98.92%	4,080	98.74%	3,955	98.68%	3,810	99.69%	4,560	99.69%	5,280	99.94%	5,075	99.86%	5,385	99.93%
Total population	3,902	100%	4,132	100%	4,008	100%	3,822	100%	4,574	100%	5,283	100%	5,082	100%	5,389	100%
Note: Totals greater than 100% due to multiple origin responses.

== Filomi Days ==
Once a year, Port Hardy holds a celebration in Rotary Park to acknowledge its natural resource based economy. The three syllables, fi, lo and mi, stand for "fishing, logging and mining". The celebration includes festivities in the park such as activities for children, fundraising concessions, entertainment, beer gardens, bake sales, craft sales, and fireworks. A dance for each age group and a parade are also held on Filomi Days weekend- typically the third weekend in July. Brookes Laidlaw represents the current Vice Admiral in the annual parade.

== Tourism ==
A deer near the Quatse river

Port Hardy's economy relies greatly on tourism. Ferries to Prince Rupert, another popular tourist destination in British Columbia, depart every other day during peak season.

== Wildlife ==
Deer, black bears, bald eagles, squirrels, seals, salmon and many other species of birds and mammals are often spotted along the Quatse Loop Nature Trail or at Storey's Beach which is a short drive from town. Humpback whales can occasionally been seen surfacing in the bay. Port Hardy has many wildlife charters, fishing charters and places to camp during tourist season.

== Climate ==
Port Hardy has an oceanic climate (Köppen Cfb) due to its proximity to the Pacific moderating influence. As a result, summers are very cool for the latitude, whereas winters instead are very mild. Although there is a strong drying trend in summer, its summer rainfall is still higher than those of the southerly mediterranean climates. Winter rainfall is very high and in general Port Hardy is far wetter than Canada's interior.

Climate data for Port Hardy (Port Hardy Airport) WMO ID: 71109; coordinates 50°40′49″N 127°21′58″W; elevation: 21.6 m (71 ft); 1991−2020 normals, extremes 1944−present
Month	Jan	Feb	Mar	Apr	May	Jun	Jul	Aug	Sep	Oct	Nov	Dec	Year
Record high humidex	14.2	16.8	19.5	22.9	35.3	31.9	30.6	32.8	30.1	25.4	18.8	15.7	35.3
Record high °C (°F)	13.8 (56.8)	16.7 (62.1)	19.8 (67.6)	23.3 (73.9)	33.4 (92.1)	31.7 (89.1)	28.0 (82.4)	28.7 (83.7)	26.2 (79.2)	25.6 (78.1)	18.9 (66.0)	14.8 (58.6)	33.4 (92.1)
Mean daily maximum °C (°F)	6.5 (43.7)	7.2 (45.0)	8.7 (47.7)	11.3 (52.3)	14.2 (57.6)	16.1 (61.0)	18.0 (64.4)	18.4 (65.1)	16.0 (60.8)	11.8 (53.2)	8.3 (46.9)	6.0 (42.8)	11.9 (53.4)
Daily mean °C (°F)	4.1 (39.4)	4.4 (39.9)	5.3 (41.5)	7.4 (45.3)	10.2 (50.4)	12.5 (54.5)	14.4 (57.9)	14.6 (58.3)	12.4 (54.3)	8.8 (47.8)	5.6 (42.1)	3.8 (38.8)	8.6 (47.5)
Mean daily minimum °C (°F)	1.6 (34.9)	1.2 (34.2)	1.8 (35.2)	3.4 (38.1)	6.1 (43.0)	8.9 (48.0)	10.8 (51.4)	10.8 (51.4)	8.8 (47.8)	5.7 (42.3)	3.0 (37.4)	1.5 (34.7)	5.3 (41.5)
Record low °C (°F)	−14.4 (6.1)	−11.8 (10.8)	−12.8 (9.0)	−3.4 (25.9)	−1.5 (29.3)	1.7 (35.1)	2.8 (37.0)	3.3 (37.9)	−1.2 (29.8)	−5.4 (22.3)	−12.5 (9.5)	−12.2 (10.0)	−14.4 (6.1)
Record low wind chill	−19.8	−23.5	−15.3	−6.9	−4.3	0.0	0.0	0.0	−2.9	−7.7	−20.8	−22.0	−23.5
Average precipitation mm (inches)	239.6 (9.43)	149.7 (5.89)	170.7 (6.72)	119.0 (4.69)	71.6 (2.82)	73.6 (2.90)	57.3 (2.26)	78.0 (3.07)	121.2 (4.77)	244.7 (9.63)	319.3 (12.57)	265.9 (10.47)	1,910.5 (75.22)
Average rainfall mm (inches)	227.2 (8.94)	144.1 (5.67)	165.2 (6.50)	117.6 (4.63)	71.6 (2.82)	73.6 (2.90)	59.5 (2.34)	78.0 (3.07)	121.2 (4.77)	244.7 (9.63)	320.7 (12.63)	255.8 (10.07)	1,879 (73.98)
Average snowfall cm (inches)	12.7 (5.0)	5.6 (2.2)	5.4 (2.1)	1.4 (0.6)	0.0 (0.0)	0.0 (0.0)	0.0 (0.0)	0.0 (0.0)	0.0 (0.0)	0.0 (0.0)	3.5 (1.4)	10.7 (4.2)	39.3 (15.5)
Average precipitation days (≥ 0.2 mm)	22.6	17.8	21.5	18.6	15.3	16.2	11.5	11.7	15.2	22.0	22.8	22.5	217.6
Average rainy days (≥ 0.2 mm)	21.6	17.2	21.0	18.6	15.3	16.2	11.9	11.7	15.2	22.0	22.6	21.4	214.7
Average snowy days (≥ 0.2 cm)	3.2	2.1	2.3	0.85	0.12	0.0	0.0	0.0	0.0	0.08	1.1	3.4	13.2
Average relative humidity (%) (at 3pm)	81.9	76.2	73.6	70.1	69.2	72.1	73.1	74.6	78.0	81.4	82.6	83.4	76.3
Mean monthly sunshine hours	51.4	73.9	114.2	143.2	174.7	165.8	201.8	189.2	150.0	95.5	56.3	46.3	1,462.4
Percentage possible sunshine	19.5	26.2	31.1	34.6	36.4	33.7	40.7	42.0	39.5	28.7	20.8	18.5	31.0
Source: Environment and Climate Change Canada (sun 1981–2010)

== Radio ==
- CFNI - 1240 Coast AM

== Transportation ==
Port Hardy is located at the northern end of British Columbia Highway 19, which runs south towards Nanaimo. It is served by the Bear Cove ferry terminal, which sees ferry sailings to Prince Rupert and summer-only service to Bella Coola. Port Hardy Airport has flights to Vancouver on Pacific Coastal Airlines. There are two taxi companies and a public transport bus.

== Sister-city relations ==
- Numata, Hokkaido, Japan since September 1994

== Gallery ==
Thunderbird Mall

Clock tower

The Seagate Wharf in Port Hardy

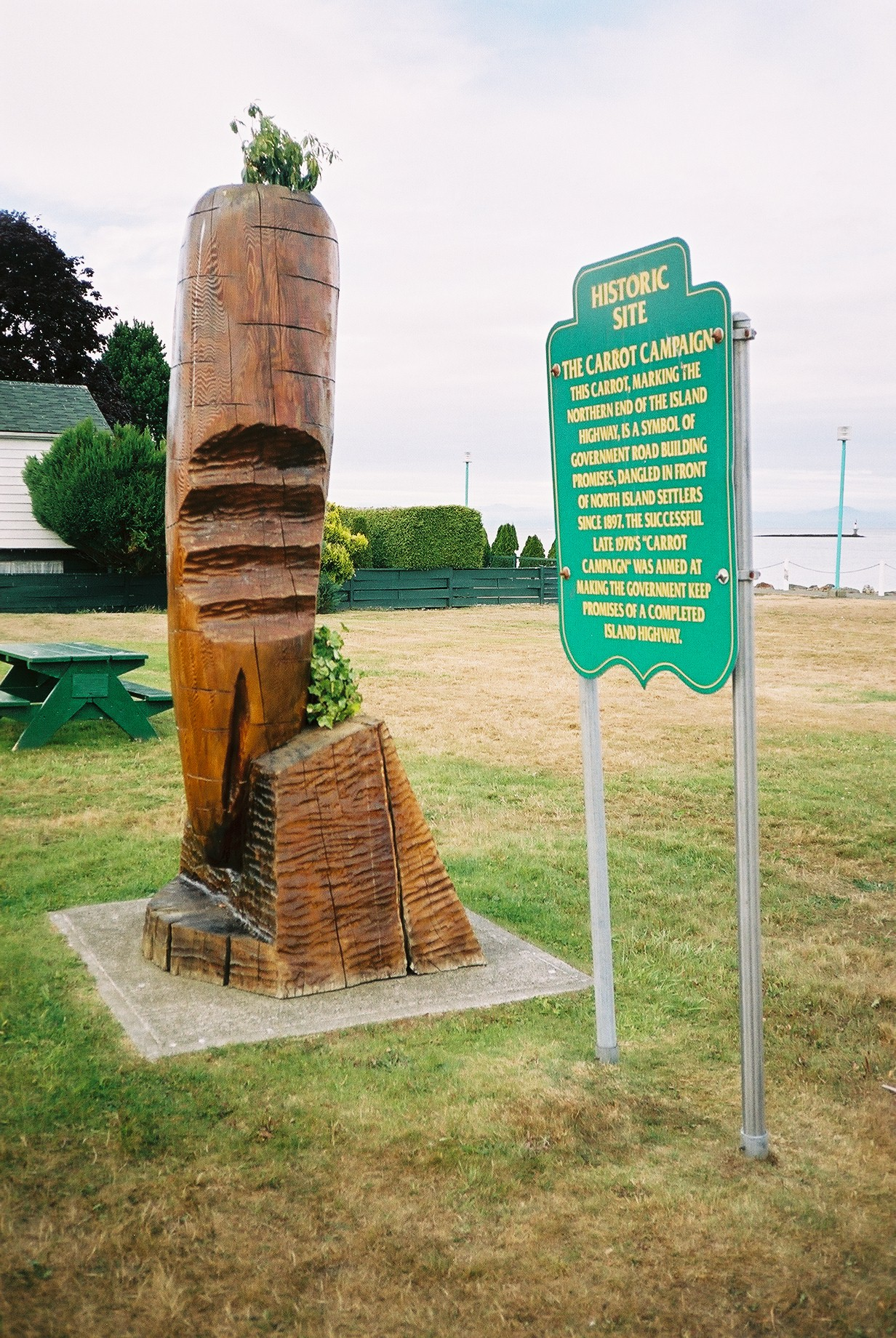
Carrot Campaign monument

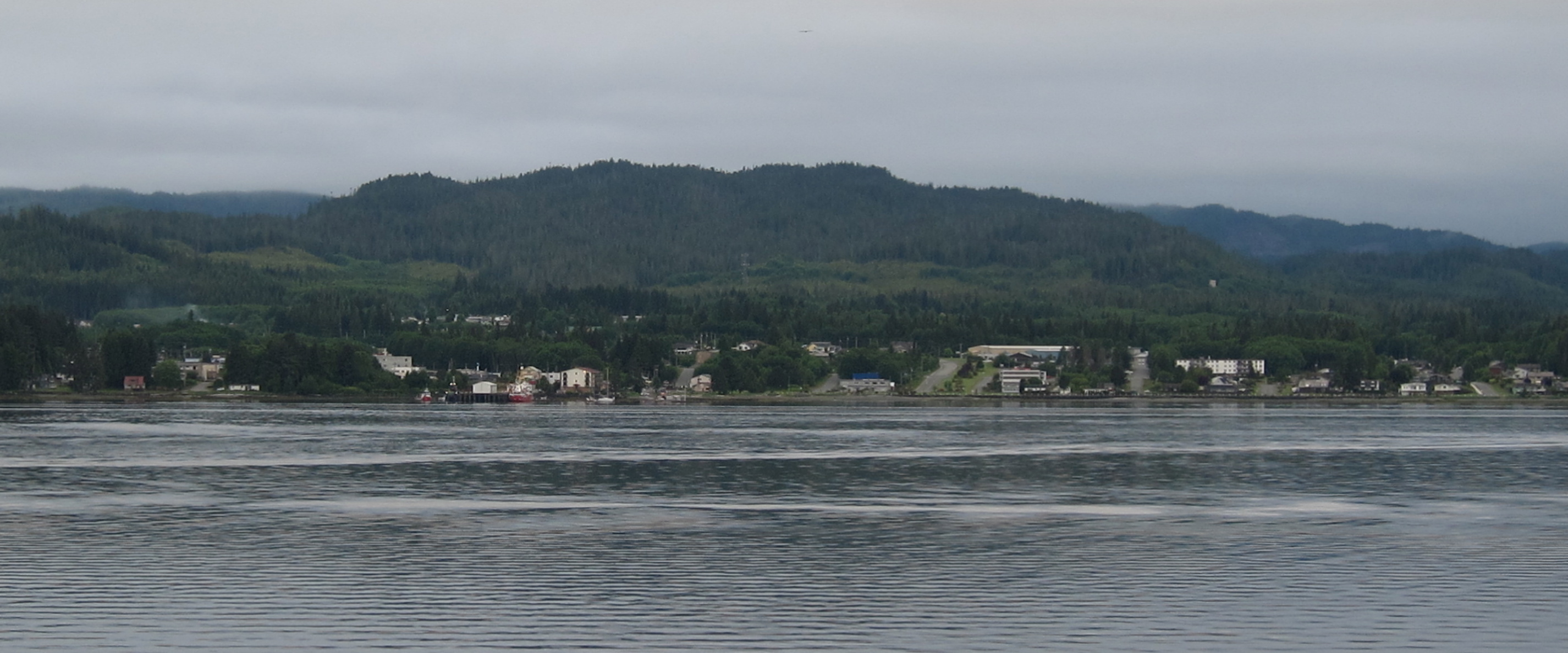
Port Hardy from the water

== See also ==
- Tlatlasikwala Nation
- Da'naxda'xw Awaetlatla Nation (Tanakteuk First Nation)
- Kwakiutl First Nation (Fort Rupert Band)
- Hardy Island Marine Provincial Park
- Penrose Island Marine Provincial Park
