= List of BC Ferries accidents and incidents =

The following is a summary of some of the incidents that have occurred involving BC Ferries vessels and/or properties.

== Vessels ==
=== Coastal Celebration ===
On May 5, 2011, Coastal Celebration damaged the dock at Swartz Bay after the vessel reversed into it for a distance of roughly 6.1 to 10.7 metres (20 to 35 ft). An investigation found that this was due to an error on the bridge. No one was hurt in the incident, however, damage to Coastal Celebration and the berth at Swartz Bay cost CAN$470,000 to repair.

On November 4, 2015, while the Coastal Celebration was sailing from Tsawwassen to Swartz Bay, a man launched one of the ship's 100-person life rafts before jumping overboard. The man then swam to Galiano Island while the ferry recovered the life raft and launched rescue craft to recover the man, who was later arrested on Galiano Island after breaking into a home.

On December 17, 2018, the Coastal Celebration rescued a man from a sinking vessel near Moresby Passage in dark and stormy conditions. All remaining sailings from Tsawwassen to Swartz Bay were cancelled that night.

=== Coastal Inspiration ===
On December 20, 2011, at 2:50 p.m., the Coastal Inspiration crashed into the Duke Point terminal, causing minor injuries to one passenger and crew member. The collision damaged the loading ramp, and foot passengers were held up for an hour before being unloaded; the vessel was rerouted to Departure Bay to unload its vehicle traffic. An electrical component failure in the propulsion control system was blamed for the crash. The ferry was taken out of service for repairs before resuming service on January 20, 2012. The damage caused the Duke Point terminal to be closed for five months, resulting in all services from Tsawwassen being rerouted into Departure Bay. The terminal reopened for service on May 1, 2012.

On August 27, 2020, a man travelling from Duke Point to Tsawwassen on board the Coastal Inspiration fell overboard. He was rescued by a nearby vessel, handed off to a BC Ferries rescue boat, then finally transferred to a Canadian Coast Guard hovercraft and transported to shore.

On August 25, 2022, the RCMP were called to meet the Coastal Inspiration after it was forced to turn around and return to the Duke Point ferry terminal in the middle of a sailing to Tsawwassen, after two men travelling together caused a disturbance by acting strangely. Police immediately arrested one of men for possible drug intoxication after finding him sleeping naked in a car parked facing the wrong direction, and launched a missing-persons case for the other after surveillance camera footage revealed that he had walked off the ferry and gotten into a waiting taxi before police arrived. He was found safe hours later and had his vehicle (which was towed off the ferry and impounded) returned to him, however the continuation of the ferry's sailing was also delayed until the early hours of the next morning as a result.

On April 22, 2026, a fire broke out in the galley of the Coastal Inspiration as it was holding in dock at the Duke Point ferry terminal, after a bearing in the ventilation shaft overheated. The crew quickly detected smoke in the galley, located and extinguished the blaze, and made the necessary repairs while awaiting clearance from Transport Canada to resume sailings. The Coastal Inspiration was left running two hours behind schedule as a result of this incident.

=== Klitsa ===
On September 5, 2025, the crew of Klitsa rescued a man who had fallen off of his dinghy and into the water near Brentwood Bay. A couple spotted the man flailing in the water as the vessel was in transit on a sailing bound for Mill Bay, and alerted the crew. The captain immediately made an announcement to inform passengers of the incident, then reversed the ferry to locate the man, who was retrieved from the water unharmed shortly thereafter. The man was able to return to his dinghy and proceeded back to shore under his own power. The next sailing from Mill Bay departed approximately 35 minutes behind schedule as a result of this incident.

=== Langdale Queen ===
On January 23, 1966, the Langdale Queen ran over a rowboat at Horseshoe Bay, both occupants of which survived.

=== Malaspina Sky ===
On June 8, 2025, at approximately 7:30am, a 66-year-old man crashed his pickup truck into the galley ramp on board the Malaspina Sky while the vessel was docked at Saltery Bay, undergoing vehicle loading in advance of a sailing bound for Earls Cove. The RCMP were called and driver was issued a $552 ticket for Improper brake performance, while the vehicle had to be towed from the vessel. The Malaspina Sky was left running delayed for several sailings afterwards, as an inspection was required to ensure the integrity of its structure.

=== Mayne Queen ===
On November 7, 1995, the Mayne Queen departed from Snug Cove and ran into a neighbouring marina, heavily damaging a floating dock in addition to 12 small pleasure boats, one of which sank. The crash was primarily attributed to human error and while transferring steering and power control from one control panel to the other located in the ship. The vessel's captain was also inexperienced with Mayne Queen and normally piloted other vessels. The captain then promptly left the scene of the accident after the incident without conducting a proper damage assessment.

On August 12, 1996, the Mayne Queen departed Swartz Bay terminal and ran aground off Piers Island after losing steering control. The grounding occurred while performing a regular weekly test of the batteries for the steering control system. A crew member overheard there was going to be a test, and in an attempt to be helpful, and without direction, cut all power from the vessel's steering batteries, as he had done at night when the ship was stored. However, he did not realize that the test in question only required the removal of a battery charger and that his assistance was neither requested nor required. No one was injured in the incident, and the vessel was assisted off the rocks at high tide, but it suffered extensive damage to its propulsion system, having two of the four steering and propulsion pods for the right-angle drives sheared off and one of the two remaining pods suffering propeller damage.

=== Mill Bay ===
On May 29, 1989, the Mill Bay ran aground near the Mill Bay ferry terminal.

=== Northern Sea Wolf ===
On November 22, 2019, the Northern Sea Wolf hit a log while underway. The log strike damaged both propellers, necessitating dry-docking the vessel for repairs. She was replaced by the smaller ferry Nimpkish. In April 2020, BC Ferries announced that Northern Sea Wolf would not run during the 2020 season due to decreased travel during the COVID-19 pandemic. The off-season schedule would continue to be run by the Nimpkish, until the Northern Sea Wolf returned to service in the latter half of 2020.

=== Queen of Alberni ===
In 1979, the Queen of Alberni ran aground in Active Pass. Many cars and trucks were damaged when the ship tilted, with some left completely overturned. There were no major injuries recorded, and the only casualty was a racehorse that was being transported in a trailer on the vehicle deck.

Misfortune struck again in 1989 when the ship smashed into the dock at the Departure Bay ferry terminal in Nanaimo. Six people were injured.

On March 12, 1992, at 8:08 a.m., the Queen of Alberni collided with the Japanese freighter Shinwa Maru southwest of Tsawwassen. The collision occurred in heavy fog, with both vessels suffering minor damage. Of the 260 people on board the ferry at the time, 2 sustained serious injuries and 25 sustained minor injuries, while all 11 people aboard the freighter walked away unharmed.

On January 8, 2025, a passenger went overboard from the Queen of Alberni due to undisclosed reasons, as the vessel arrived at the Tsawwassen terminal. Due to the extraordinary performance of the deck officers and crew, the passenger was recovered from the water and was safely handed over to emergency responders.

=== Queen of Burnaby ===
On August 25, 1966, the Queen of Burnaby broke loose from her mooring at the Departure Bay ferry terminal while her engines were being run in the early morning. The variable-pitch propellers were not left in the neutral position as was standard, and no crew was present on the bridge. The ferry was recovered after the anchor was dropped and the captain was shuttled to the vessel, allowing the day's sailings to continue as scheduled.

=== Queen of Capilano ===
On February 2, 2025, the Queen of Capilano collided with 3 docked boats at the Bowen Island Marina dock in Snug Cove, The incident occurred around 7:30 a.m. as the ferry was departing from Bowen Island. The collision caused significant damage to the dock and the 3 vessels. No injuries were reported. Following the collision, the ferry completed several morning sailings. However, starting with the 10:15 a.m. departure from Horseshoe Bay, BC Ferries canceled 14 sailings due to mechanical difficulties related to the propulsion system. Service resumed with the 6:50 p.m. sailing after the vessel underwent sea trials as required by Transport Canada.

=== Queen of Coquitlam ===
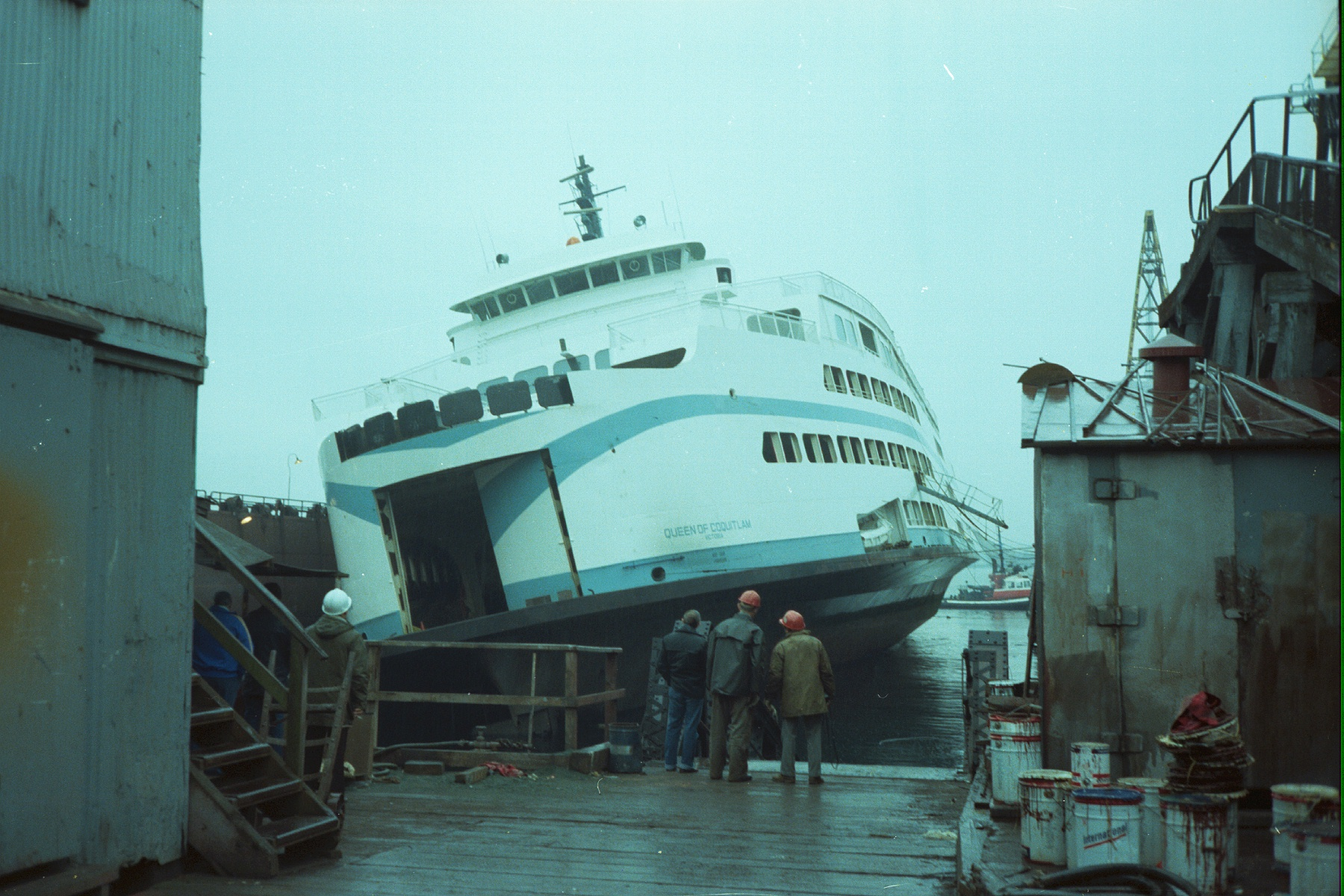
The Queen of Coquitlam listing due to a leak in the dry dock

On October 19, 1980, the Queen of Coquitlam sustained 3 million dollars' worth of damage after a leak in the Burrard Shipyard floating dry dock caused the vessel to develop a starboard list.

In October 1995, the vessel lost power and slammed into pilings at Horseshoe Bay, damaging her bow.

On June 18, 2025, footage surfaced on social media of an unidentified individual operating a water scooter in a reckless manner near the Queen of Coquitlam while the vessel was in transit on a sailing between Langdale and Horseshoe Bay. The scooter operator was seen speeding up behind the vessel before turning and cutting underneath of its stern. A BC Ferries spokesperson confirmed that the incident had been reported to the Sunshine Coast RCMP, who immediately launched an investigation, as the act was both dangerous and illegal. Furthermore, BC Ferries urged the boating public to refrain from performing similar stunts and to keep their distance from moving vessels when on the water.

=== Queen of Cowichan ===
On August 12, 1985, three occupants were killed when the Queen of Cowichan ran over a pleasure craft near the Horseshoe Bay ferry terminal. The BC Court of Appeal found the Queen of Cowichan to be two-thirds at fault and ordered that $500,000 in damages be paid.

On June 19, 2018, the vessel launched a rescue boat to recover a man who went overboard near Bowen Island, after the ferry had departed Horseshoe Bay for Nanaimo. The man was transferred to nearby Coast Guard vessel, and the ferry experienced minor delays in the continuation of its sailing.

On October 19, 2019, a crew member was significantly injured after being hit by the vessel's bow door which was having trouble opening at Horseshoe Bay terminal. BC Ferries subsequently cancelled the next round trip to Departure Bay and back.

On February 21, 2021, the RCMP were called to meet the vessel as it arrived at the Departure Bay ferry terminal, after two intoxicated women (aged 19 and 43) acted belligerently and caused a disturbance while refusing to wear masks while on a sailing from Horseshoe Bay, during the COVID-19 pandemic. One of the women then threatened to kill one of the two responding RCMP officers, while the other threatened to sue both officers for false arrest and ensure they lost their pensions. The women were arrested for mischief and public intoxication, and were held in jail overnight. The officers elected not to pursue criminal charges and instead the pair were released the next day after being issued $920 worth of tickets each for violating COVID-19 restrictions and acting abusively.

On June 1, 2026, a video appearing to have been filmed by passenger on the vessel's outside depicting a small pleasure craft wake riding close behind the Queen of Cowichan as it approached the Horseshoe Bay ferry terminal surfaced online. BC Ferries responded stating that they would not investigate the incident, however Transport Canada (via referral from the Canadian Coast Guard) stated that local police were reviewing the incident to determine if further action will be required.

=== Queen of Cumberland ===
On April 18, 2018, the Queen of Cumberland's crew members were injured during a safety drill at Swartz Bay ferry terminal. When a hoist cable parted on the ship's davit, a rescue boat holding two occupants fell about 11 metres (36 ft) into the water. The boat was damaged and both individuals were injured, one seriously.

On July 1, 2025, a male passenger was seen driving his Tesla erratically at the Village Bay ferry terminal on Mayne Island, before he failed to obey the orders of terminal staff while boarding the Queen of Cumberland for an 11:30 PM sailing bound for Swartz Bay, and parked at the front of the vessel instead of where he was originally directed. Later, during the crossing, the passenger exited his vehicle while pantless and began washing his car with bottled water and paper towels while appearing extremely agitated. The passenger then stole a sledgehammer from the ship's anchor compartment and used it to smash the lock off the safety gates at the front of the ship. He then re-entered his vehicle and attempted to drive around the gates and off the deck overboard. BC Ferries' crew members attempted to intervene, however the passenger immediately became abusive and began shouting at the deckhands. He then repeatedly drove forwards toward the edge of the deck, braked hard, then reversed. He even drove over blocks put against his tires by the crew, in hopes of bringing the vehicle to a stop. He also struck as many as two crew members with his vehicle in the process. When the vessel arrived at the Swartz Bay ferry terminal, police were waiting on the ramp, as they had been called while the ship was in transit. They quickly dragged the man from his vehicle and arrested him before he could flee the scene, and later stated that he was found to have been experiencing a mental health crisis at the time. The BC Prosecution Service has since approved five charges against the passenger: assault with a weapon, 2 counts of mischief, dangerous operation of a motor vehicle, and obstruction. The passenger was remanded into custody, pending his next court appearance.

=== Queen of the Islands ===
On September 20, 1978, the Queen of the Islands rammed the Saltery Bay dock causing $495,000 worth of damage.

=== Queen of Nanaimo ===
On November 2, 2013, the Queen of Nanaimo was pushed off course by severe weather as it was leaving the berth at the Village Bay ferry terminal, on Mayne Island, damaging a private dock. While no one was injured, the ship also sustained damage, and all Tsawwassen–Gulf Islands sailings had to be cancelled for the following week, while it was repaired.

=== Queen of New Westminster ===
On October 20, 1971, the Queen of New Westminster pulled out of its berth at the Departure Bay ferry terminal while vehicle loading was in progress, causing a car and its two occupants to fall into the water, both of whom were rescued.

In a similar incident, on August 13, 1992, the Queen of New Westminster pulled out of its berth at the Departure Bay ferry terminal while the vehicle loading ramps were still lowered and resting on the ship. Three people were killed, including two children. One additional passenger was seriously injured, and two others received minor injuries when a van containing 6 people fell 15 m (49 ft) from the upper loading ramp and bounced off the lower loading ramp, then finally landed in the sea below. The van had been stopped and instructed to wait on the loading ramp by terminal crew members. The Transportation Safety Board of Canada determined that the accident was caused by the vessel not following its departing procedures correctly and secondarily due to poor communication between terminal and ship crew members.

=== Queen of the North ===
On December 17, 1974, the formerly named Queen of Surrey was withdrawn from service to repair damage sustained from a fire in an electrical panel.

On March 22, 2006, the Queen of the North sank 135 nmi (250 km; 155 mi) south of Prince Rupert, British Columbia, when it struck Gil Island at approximately 1:00 a.m. Two people from 100 Mile House, Gerald Foisy and Shirley Rosette, were reported missing. BC Ferries CEO David Hahn said, "There is a real possibility that they went down with the ship." It is unlikely that it will be possible to salvage the Queen of the North.

Officials later determined the cause of the incident was human error on the part of three BC Ferries employees who neglected their navigational duties. Charges of criminal negligence causing death were considered, and a class action lawsuit for the passengers is proceeding while the Ferry and Marine Workers Union sought to reinstate the fired crew members who failed to provide information to the $1 million TSB enquiry.

=== Queen of Oak Bay ===
On June 30, 2005, the Queen of Oak Bay lost power and drifted into Sewell's Marina, damaging 28 pleasure crafts and running aground near Horseshoe Bay. No injuries were reported, and subsequent investigations revealed a missing cotter pin in the speed governor system as the cause of the incident. BC Ferries quickly repaired the vessel, which returned to service on July 8, 2005.

=== Queen of Prince Rupert ===
On August 25, 1982, the Queen of Prince Rupert departed from McLoughlin Bay (Bella Bella, Campbell Island) several hours behind schedule, bound for Ocean Falls. In an effort to make up for lost time, the captain ordered for the ship to be taken through Gunboat Passage, a narrow and dangerous shortcut. This new route would have allowed for the vessel to entirely skip its usual southward trek around Denny Island, followed by northward backtrack, in order to arrive at Ocean Falls. Conversely, the Gunboat Passage shortcut allows for a ship to sail between Denny Island and Cunningham Island, cutting the sailing time to Ocean Falls approximately in half. When the Queen of Prince Rupert entered Gunboat Passage, several passengers aboard the ship went immediately to the Purser's Office to warn the crew that they were going the wrong way, down an unsafe passage. The Purser informed them that the captain knew what he was doing, and that everything was going as planned. Soon after, the ship ran aground in a particularly tight part of the channel. The captain quickly had the ship removed from the rock before continuing forward up the channel, only to run aground again on the same rock, further damaging the hull. This time, the ship would not budge, and the crew and passengers had to wait for 12 hours before being pulled away by a variety of tugboats, fishing boats, and a Coast Guard ship. The captain then turned the Queen of Prince Rupert around and opted to sail the normal route around Denny Island, at that time.

=== Queen of Saanich ===
On the morning of February 6, 1992, the Queen of Saanich and the passenger catamaran Royal Vancouver collided in heavy fog near the northern entrance of Active Pass. The bow doors of the Saanich were damaged. Aboard the Royal Vancouver, 23 passengers and four crew sustained largely minor injuries. Although both vessels were operating their radar systems, the Royal Vancouver was found negligent in this regard.

=== Queen of Surrey ===
On August 29, 1982, the Queen of Surrey rammed the Horseshoe Bay dock causing significant damage.

On May 12, 2003, the vessel was disabled as a result of an engine room fire. The Queen of Capilano was dispatched and tethered to the Queen of Surrey while tugboats were dispatched. The vessel was then towed back to shore. None of the 318 passengers were injured, but several crew members were treated for minor injuries. Some buckling of the main car deck resulted from the heat of the fire, but no vehicles were damaged in the incident.

On March 26, 2019, the 7:30 a.m. sailing from Horseshoe Bay of the vessel had an incident while docking at Langdale at 8:10am. The ship collided with a terminal structure and damaged its leading end. The bow of the ferry subsequently became lodged on the structure, causing severe delays, with all following vehicle sailings that day cancelled until the late evening, when relief could be provided. Passenger service was offered by water taxi for walk-in passengers.

=== Queen of Victoria ===
On August 2, 1970, the Soviet freighter Sergey Yesenin collided with the Queen of Victoria in Active Pass, slicing through the middle of the ferry, days after its return to service following stretching. Three people were killed, and damage was estimated at over $1 million (1970 dollars). The Soviet ship did not have permission to be in Active Pass, and as such, the Soviet government compensated BC Ferries.

In 1972, while in Active Pass and within metres of the site of the 1970 collision, the Queen of Victoria was disabled by a fire in the engine room.

=== Quinsam ===
On January 9, 2007, the Quinsam was loading traffic from Nanaimo to Gabriola Island when it unexpectedly pulled out of its berth. A pickup truck on the boarding ramp plunged into the water below. Ferry workers were able to warn the truck's lone occupant, who escaped before the vehicle fell.

=== Sechelt Queen ===
On April 5, 1962, the Sechelt Queen ran aground on a submerged reef east of Snake Island in dense fog.

On July 17, 1962, a time-bomb, comprising three sticks of dynamite, likely planted by the Freedomites, destroyed a locker on board the Sechelt Queen.

On July 14, 1974, the Sechelt Queen collided with a pleasure craft in Active Pass, causing some damage, but did not stop to render assistance.

=== Spirit of British Columbia ===
On July 27, 2005, a man attempting to travel to Mayne Island missed his ferry, so he instead boarded the Spirit of British Columbia (which sails between Tsawwassen and Swartz Bay, passing near Mayne Island while in transit) and jumped overboard as the vessel was approaching Active Pass. The man refused to be rescued by crew members who were sent to assist him and was later banned from travelling with BC Ferries.

On April 27, 2019, the Spirit of British Columbia was damaged while docking at Tsawwassen ferry terminal during heavy winds.

On September 29, 2021, three men were arrested by Delta Police onboard the Spirit of British Columbia at the Tsawwassen ferry terminal, after they threatened to fight fellow passengers and BC Ferries' staff members who confronted them as they were not wearing masks during the COVID-19 pandemic, while on a sailing from Swartz Bay. The men were later released from jail with conditions that they were not to attend any BC Ferries' property, pending a court appearance that December.

On September 3, 2025, a passenger jumped overboard off of the Spirit of British Columbia as the vessel was nearing the Tsawwassen ferry terminal, at the conclusion of a sailing from Swartz Bay. The passenger had apparently entered the water to retrieve an item of clothing that they had lost, and was rescued by BC Ferries' crew members, via a rescue boat dispatched from either the Spirit of British Columbia or the Queen of New Westminster, which also stopped off its route to assist, along with a Canadian Coast Guard hovercraft. The Spirit of British Columbia was left running an hour behind schedule as result of this incident. The next day, another passenger went overboard off a BC Ferries vessel travelling on the same route, but in the opposite direction, just east of Active Pass. The vessel again dispatched a rescue boat which retrieved the passenger and transferred them to another Canadian Coast Guard vessel. No health updates were provided for either passenger, nor were any delays reported on the second sailing. BC Ferries did, however, state that while both incidents were likely unrelated and unintentional, they are both under investigation as having two such incidents back-to-back is highly unusual.

=== Spirit of Vancouver Island ===
On September 14, 2000, the Spirit of Vancouver Island collided with the 9.72 m (31.9 ft) Star Ruby while attempting to overtake the vessel in a narrow channel. The collision occurred approximately 1 km (0.62 mi) from the Swartz Bay Terminal, from which the ferry had departed. The Spirit of Vancouver Island struck the Star Ruby on its port side, causing the pleasure craft to flip over and eventually right itself, though swamped and heavily damaged. According to the accident report, the pleasure craft ignored warning blasts from the approaching ferry and made a sharp turn towards the ferry just prior to impact. Both individuals aboard the Star Ruby later died as a result of injuries sustained by the collision.

On July 21, 2003, the Spirit of Vancouver Island collided with the dock at Swartz Bay. Four passengers suffered minor injuries. The accident caused tens of thousands of dollars of damage to the dock and the ship.

On October 9, 2009, a standby generator onboard the Spirit of Vancouver Island caught fire on an early morning sailing out of Swartz Bay Terminal. No one was injured in the incident, but it caused major delays in the ferry system because of the already large volume of traffic for Thanksgiving weekend. Eight sailings were cancelled that day, and the ship remained out of service for the weekend.

On August 31, 2018, two crew members were injured during an early morning safety drill at Swartz Bay ferry terminal when the ship's davit malfunctioned, causing a rescue boat to flip, dropping the two occupants into the water. The coxswain fell about 14 metres (46 ft), but the bowman held on while the boat continued to descend, reducing the fall to about 2 metres (7 ft).

On April 18, 2020, at 4:26 p.m., the vessel, travelling at an approximate speed of 5.4 knots, struck the concrete abutment on the wall of berth 3 at Tsawwassen ferry terminal. Although damage was minor, the offloading of vehicles on the upper car deck and foot passengers was delayed until 6:02 p.m. Passengers were required to disembark from the main car deck instead of the overhead walkway. Offloading of vehicles on the main car deck began at 8:58 p.m.

On April 2, 2021, the Spirit of Vancouver Island was forced to turn around and return to Swartz Bay in the middle of a sailing to Tsawwassen after a passenger caused a disturbance while being confronted by staff about him not wearing a mask during the COVID-19 pandemic. RCMP officers met the ferry as it arrived at the dock, issued the passenger several tickets for violating COVID-19 restrictions, and transported him off-site. The passenger was also banned from riding the ferries for the rest of the day. The Spirit of Vancouver Island was left running 44 minutes behind schedule as result of the incident.

On June 28, 2025, a BC Ferries' deckhand was attacked by a shirtless male passenger on one the vehicle decks of the Spirit of British Columbia while it was docked at the Tsawwassen ferry terminal, in preparation for a 7 AM sailing bound for Swartz Bay. The passenger punched and kicked the deckhand before running up through the ship's galley and biting a security officer who attempted to intervene. An off-duty police officer, along with several crew members, subdued the man shortly thereafter and held him until police arrived to arrest him. The security officer was taken to a nearby hospital as a precaution, due to the bite injury having drawn blood.

=== Vesuvius Queen ===
In August 1983, the Vesuvius Queen rammed and substantially damaged the Saltspring Island dock.

== Facilities ==
=== Departure Bay ferry terminal ===
On August 13, 2014, suspected kidnapper David Rogerson was arrested on a ferry docked at the Departure Bay ferry terminal after BC Ferries' staff recognized him as the subject of a Canada-wide warrant during a sailing from Horseshoe Bay, and called police to inform them that Rogerson and his vehicle were on board the vessel.

On May 8, 2018, a police shooting occurred at the terminal after RCMP officers attempted to arrest a man wanted for perpetrating a violent carjacking in another part of the province. Six to eight shots were fired, and the man later died from his injuries.

=== Denman Island West ferry terminal ===
On November 15, 2024, emergency crews were called after a pickup truck drove through the terminal (outside the vehicle loading lanes) and crashed through a railing between the terminal's two berths, before plunging into the ocean below. Both occupants of the truck were brought ashore by way of life rings and were then taken to hospital for treatment. The police investigation into this incident is ongoing, and as impaired driving is being considered as a factor, criminal charges may be laid if such are deemed to be necessary. The Baynes Sound Connector departed late for its next sailing to Buckley Bay and was left running one sailing behind for the rest of the day, as a result of this incident.

=== Earls Cove ferry terminal ===
On September 20, 2020, an elderly woman collapsed in the morning ferry lineup at the terminal and went into respiratory failure, leading to cardiac arrest. A BC Ferries' employee initiated CPR and the local Fire Department and Ambulance service were called, and the woman's pulse was eventually restored. Once she began breathing on her own, she was airlifted to hospital from the parking lot.

=== Horseshoe Bay ferry terminal ===
On May 22, 2017, two passengers (a 47-year-old male and a 31-year-old female) were removed from the Queen of Cowichan by the West Vancouver Police Department, while it was docked at the Horseshoe Bay ferry terminal. This occurred after the pair drove onto the ferry bound for Nanaimo, having bought cheaper tickets on the shorter Bowen Island route instead. Shortly thereafter, they aroused the suspicions of staff members when they refused to put out their cigarettes on the vehicle deck when asked, then verbally abused the staff members when they were asked to leave the vessel. Police were called to assist after the two subjects refused to disembark the ferry, however no further incident occurred.

On December 19, 2020, police were called to the terminal to assist with a man acting belligerently while refusing to wear a mask during the COVID-19 pandemic. Officers reportedly escorted the man off BC Ferries' property.

On October 13, 2021, the Canadian Coast Guard was dispatched after it was discovered that a female passenger in her 50's had ended up in the water by unknown means, after driving her vehicle on board the vessel at Departure Bay. The water was searched around both terminals, and the passenger was eventually recovered on the mainland side and taken to hospital for treatment and a mental health evaluation. The next sailing back to Nanaimo was delayed by an hour and 44 minutes as a result.

On January 14, 2023, a Tesla Model 3 suddenly accelerated before crashing into a gate blocking an empty berth at the terminal, and was effectively destroyed on impact. Both occupants of the vehicle were transported to hospital with non life-threatening injuries. The cause of the accident remains unknown.

On May 28, 2025, an articulated bus operated by TransLink, struck three pedestrians outside the ferry terminal. The collision resulted in the death of a four-year-old boy at the scene. His mother sustained critical injuries and was transported to Lions Gate Hospital, while a family friend sustained minor injuries and was later released. The crash occurred at the intersection of Keith Road and Bay Street, adjacent to the terminal's foot passenger waiting area. West Vancouver Police Department closed surrounding roads for several hours. As a result, several TransLink bus stops serving the terminal were temporarily relocated. Ferry sailings continued as scheduled, with none delayed or cancelled. Terminal access remained open to foot passengers and vehicles.

On April 19, 2026, police were called to the terminal to attend to passenger in need of assistance onboard the Queen of Surrey, which was holding in dock in preparation for a sailing to Langdale. This incident caused delays to several subsequent sailings between Horseshoe Bay and Langdale, as well as to Departure Bay and Bowen Island, with multiple vessels being held in dock as well as two at sea, from 10:55am onwards, while overflow traffic landside was redirected to Tsawwassen and Duke Point. Water taxis were brought in to move foot passengers on the Langdale route, starting at 4:30pm, and the terminal otherwise stayed at a standstill until after 6:30pm that evening, when sailings finally resumed after the passenger was detained under the mental health act.

=== Langdale ferry terminal ===
On May 26, 2023, a 36-year-old Surrey man was arrested at the Langdale ferry terminal by the RCMP for uttering threats after refusing to obey the directions of a BC Ferries staff member, driving his van aggressively, and boarding a ferry without permission. The man was banned from travelling with BC Ferries for one year.

=== Nanaimo Harbour ferry terminal ===
On March 20, 2013, at about 2:20 am, a woman from Gabriola Island drove her van through a barrier gate and onto the docked Quinsam, before speeding off the end of the vessel to her death. An RCMP dive team recovered the van and the victim's body from 40 metres (130 ft) below the surface of the water, the next day.

=== Quathiaski Cove ferry terminal ===
On August 10, 2022, a man was asked to leave the terminal property by the RCMP after interfering with BC Ferries' staff by attempting to direct traffic in the parking lot himself. The man refused to stop when staff members asked him to do so, and as such police were called. The man was initially argumentative about being asked to leave, but eventually did so without further incident.

On October 9, 2022, a man who had previously been banned from travelling with BC Ferries for reasons unknown was spotted by staff while he attempted to board a ferry departing Quadra Island for Campbell River. The subject was allegedly wearing a disguise consisting of a wig, scarf, sunglasses, and a mask. The man apparently also used an odd, high-pitched accent that was either Australian or British, in efforts to conceal his true identity. BC Ferries called the RCMP upon recognizing the man, however he apparently fled on foot up a nearby trail before he could be apprehended, leaving items from his disguise behind as he ran. The responding police officers stated that they plan to locate the man and issue him a $115 ticket for trespassing.

=== Swartz Bay ferry terminal ===
On May 20, 2011, 29-year-old James Davies crashed his pickup truck through the barricades on the Swartz Bay ferry terminal's loading ramp, and sped off the end of the platform. His vehicle crashed into water below, where his body was recovered from 35 feet below the surface of the water, later that evening. Davies' death was subsequently ruled a suicide.

On October 10, 2023, a 16-year-old boy was arrested by the RCMP for setting a fire in a washroom on board a ferry docked at the terminal. The youth was released with a future court date.

On January 11, 2024, the RCMP arrested a man at the terminal for committing an indecent act, after he allegedly exposed himself on board an evening sailing from Tsawwassen. The man was released with a future court date and was transported to a nearby shelter due to the extremely cold weather at the time.

=== Tsawwassen ferry terminal ===
On May 29, 2019, a man stole a taxi at the Tsawwassen ferry terminal before nearly striking a Delta Police Department vehicle in a parking lot off the ferry causeway at high speed. The officer occupying the cruiser immediately called for backup and chased after the man when he exited the taxi and fled on foot. The officer had the man at gunpoint shortly thereafter, when the man pulled a knife. The officer ordered the man to drop the knife, and tased him three times after he failed to comply. Over the next 15 minutes, 9 officers responded, however the man then pulled a pipe from his backpack as well, and goaded the officers to shoot him. The officers fired no shots, and continued attempts to de-escalate the situation, using tasers and 40mm less-lethal launchers, however the man ultimately turned the knife on himself, stabbing his neck repeatedly. Attempts were made to save the man's life, however he died from his injuries shortly thereafter. A toxicology reported later revealed that the man had methamphetamine in his system at the time, and the Independent Investigations Office (IIO) subsequently cleared the Delta Police Department of any wrongdoing in regards to this incident.

On November 4, 2020, police were called to the terminal after a man ran through traffic and into the ocean due to being denied boarding onto a ferry in the early hours of the morning. Police coaxed the man out of the water, only to have him attempt to walk into traffic a second time. The man was taken into protective custody for mental health reasons.

Police were again called to the terminal later that day after a woman caused a disturbance while refusing to wear a mask during the COVID-19 pandemic. Officers reportedly escorted the woman off-site, to another location. These two incidents left the Spirit of British Columbia running 49 minutes behind schedule.

On September 13, 2026, two people were rescued after being spotted in the water near the terminal after their fishing vessel sank. Rescue boats were deployed from both the Coastal Renaissance and the Spirit of British Columbia, which transported the rescued individuals to the terminal, where they were met by local police and emergency health services and were transported to hospital in stable condition. This incident left the 3:15 sailing bound for Duke Point running 73 minutes behind schedule, and with delays expected on sailings until 10:45pm that night.

=== Fleet Maintenance Facility ===
On June 12, 2020, BC Ferries worker Kulwant Singh Chohan fell into the Fraser River while on shift at the Fleet Maintenance Facility in Richmond, British Columbia, after attempting to retrieve a knee pad that had fallen into the water. Surveillance cameras later revealed that Chohan was leaning over a protective webbing panel, which broke away, causing him to fall into the river. Chohan's disappearance went unnoticed until his family showed up at the facility later that evening, stating that he had not returned home as scheduled. Police were immediately called and a land and marine search was conducted, however Chohan's body was not recovered until the next day, from five metres below the surface of the river. On October 21, 2022, The BC Coroner Service announced that Chohan's cause of death was accidental drowning, with heart disease as a contributing factor. WorkSafeBC fined BC Ferries $674,445 as a result of their investigation into the incident.

== See also ==
- BC Ferries
- List of BC Ferries ships
