= Queen of Cowichan =

C class ferry built in 1976

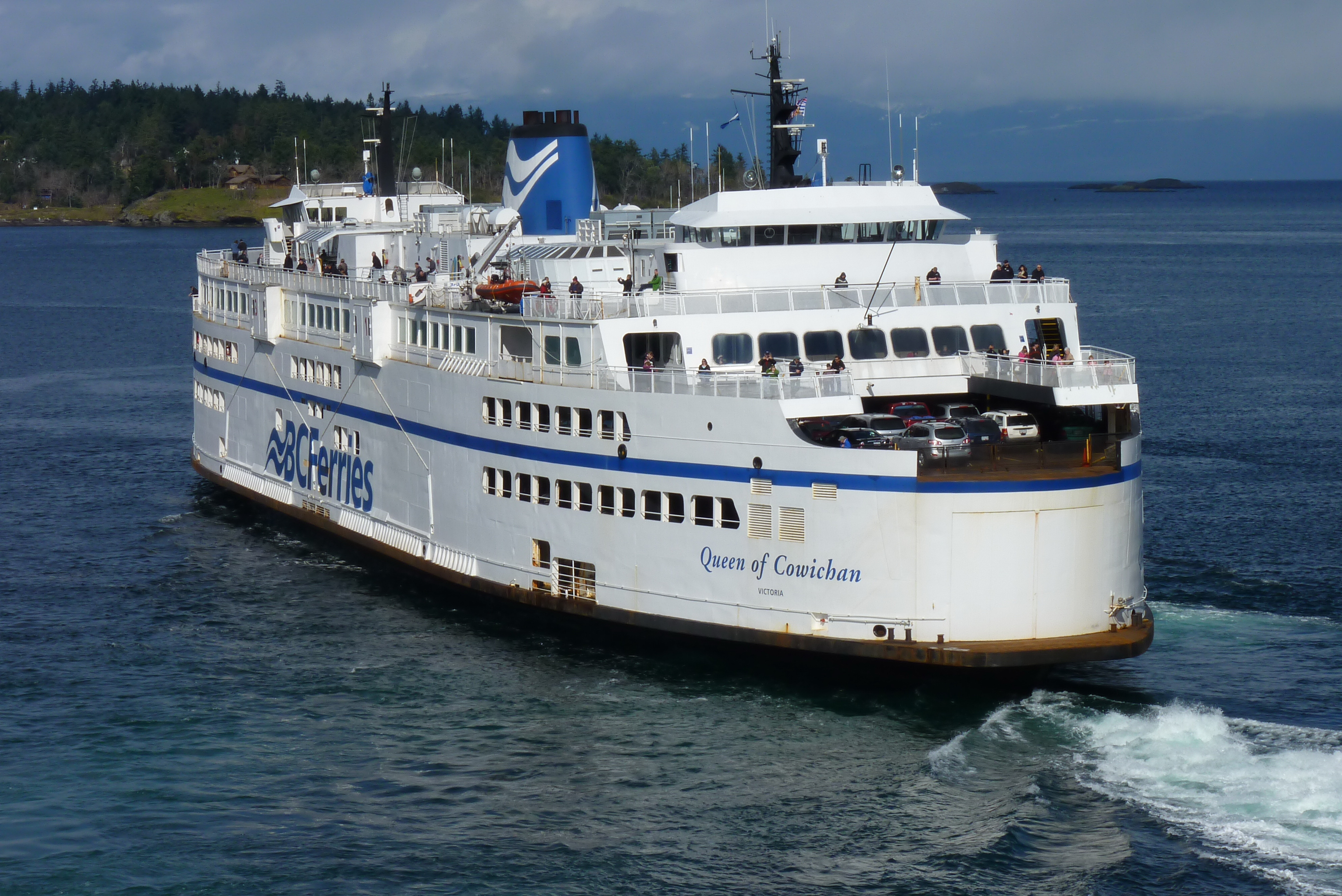
- Queen of Cowichan at Departure Bay

History

Canada
- Name: Queen of Cowichan
- Namesake: Cowichan Valley, British Columbia
- Owner: British Columbia Ferry Services Inc.
- Operator: British Columbia Ferry Services Inc.
- Route: Departure Bay - Horseshoe Bay
- Builder: Burrard Yarrows Corp., Victoria
- Laid down: October 1975
- Completed: February 1976
- Identification: IMO number: 7411143; MMSI number: 316001251; Callsign: CZ4990
- Status: in active service

General characteristics
- Class & type: C-class ferry
- Tonnage: 6503
- Length: 139 m (456 ft 0 in)
- Installed power: 11,860 hp (8,840 kW)
- Propulsion: Two MaK 12M551AK
- Speed: 20.5 knots (38.0 km/h)
- Capacity: 1,494 passengers & crew; 360 cars

Queen of Cowichan is a BC Ferries vessel, built in Victoria, British Columbia in 1976. It joined the other two C-class ferries built that year, Queen of Alberni and Queen of Coquitlam, and was followed by Queen of Surrey and Queen of Oak Bay. The ship, like all C-class ferries, is double-ended. This means the ship never has to turn around in port during regular service. The ship's two MaK 12M551AK engines turn out 11,860 horsepower (8,840 kW) which gives it a service speed of 20.5 knots (38.0 km/h; 23.6 mph). Like all the C-class ferries it is 139.28 metres (456 ft 11 in) long. Almost identical to Queen of Coquitlam, the vessel has a car capacity of 312 and a passenger capacity for 1,494 people. The ship has three car decks. A lower (main) car deck, for trucks, buses and overheight vehicles, a gallery deck for overheight vehicles cars and bicycles, and an upper car deck for cars and motorcycles. She is named for the regional district of Cowichan Valley Regional District.
