= C-class ferry =

Class of cargo ferries

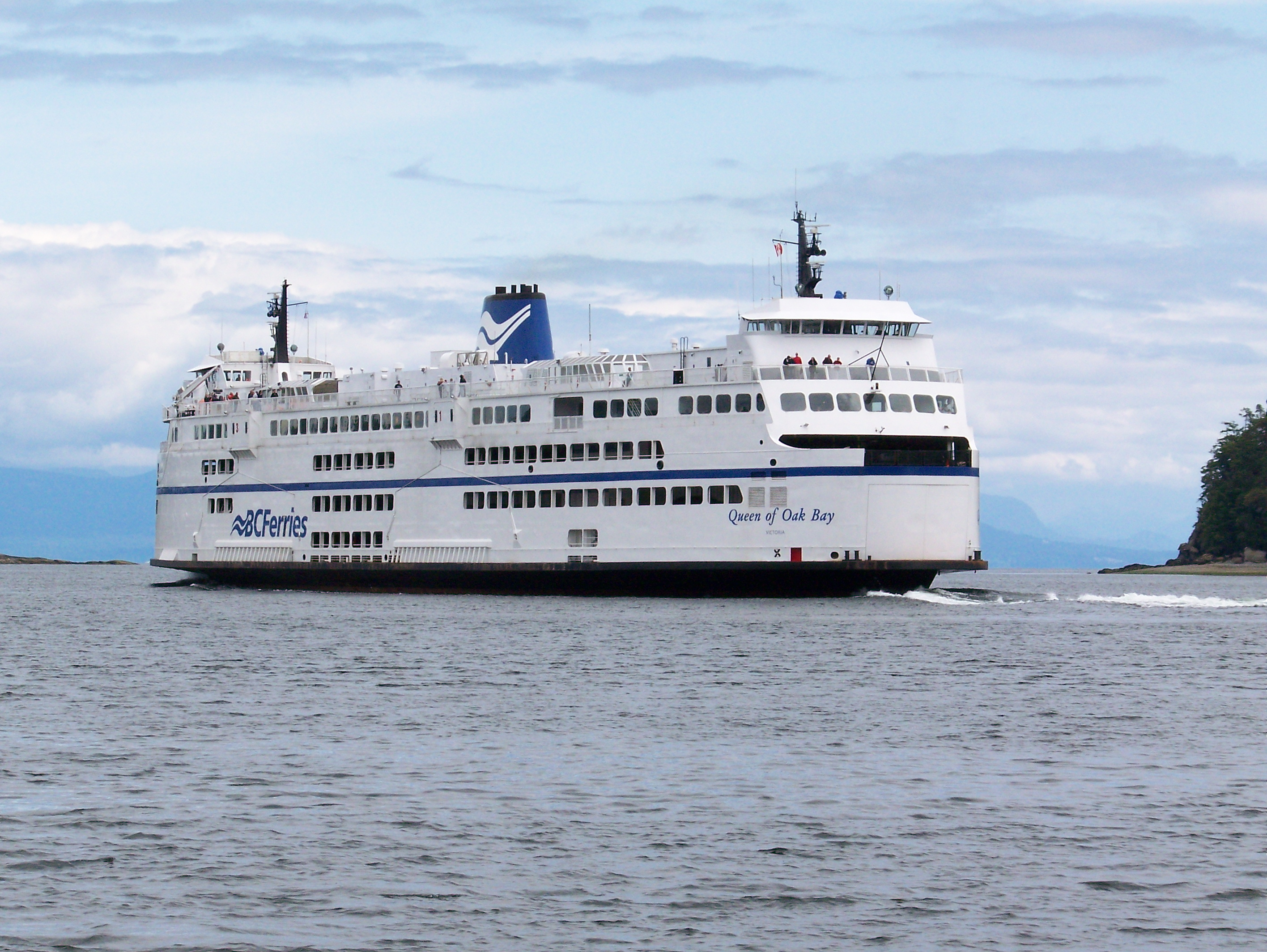
- Queen of Oak Bay departs the Departure Bay ferry terminal in June 2008

Class overview
- Operators: BC Ferries
- Preceded by: Victoria class
- Succeeded by: Coastal class
- Built: 1976–1981; upgraded 2003–2007

General characteristics
- Type: Double-ended, roll-on/roll-off ferry
- Tonnage: 6,968.91 tons (5,863.22 tons for Queen of Alberni)
- Length: 139.29 m (457 ft 0 in)
- Beam: 27 m (88 ft 7 in)
- Draft: 6 m (19 ft 8 in)
- Installed power: 11,860 hp (8.84 MW) via 2 × 6,000 hp (4.5 MW) each maximum
- Propulsion: Two MaK 12M551AK
- Speed: 20.5 to 22 knots (38.0 to 40.7 km/h; 23.6 to 25.3 mph)
- Capacity: 1,466 passengers (~ 1,200 for Queen of Alberni); 316 vehicles (280 for Queen of Alberni)

The C-class ferries (also known as Cowichan class) are a class of five double-ended roll-on/roll-off ferries operated by BC Ferries in the Strait of Georgia in British Columbia, constructed between 1976 and 1981. When the vessels were first built, they were the largest ships of their kind in the world. The C-class ferries are 139.29 m (457.0 ft) long, with a car capacity of 316, and a crew and passenger capacity of 1494 persons. Each vessel's two MaK 12M551AK engines produce 11,860 HP, which provides a maximum service speed of 20.5 knots (38.0 km/h; 23.6 mph).

== C-class vessels ==
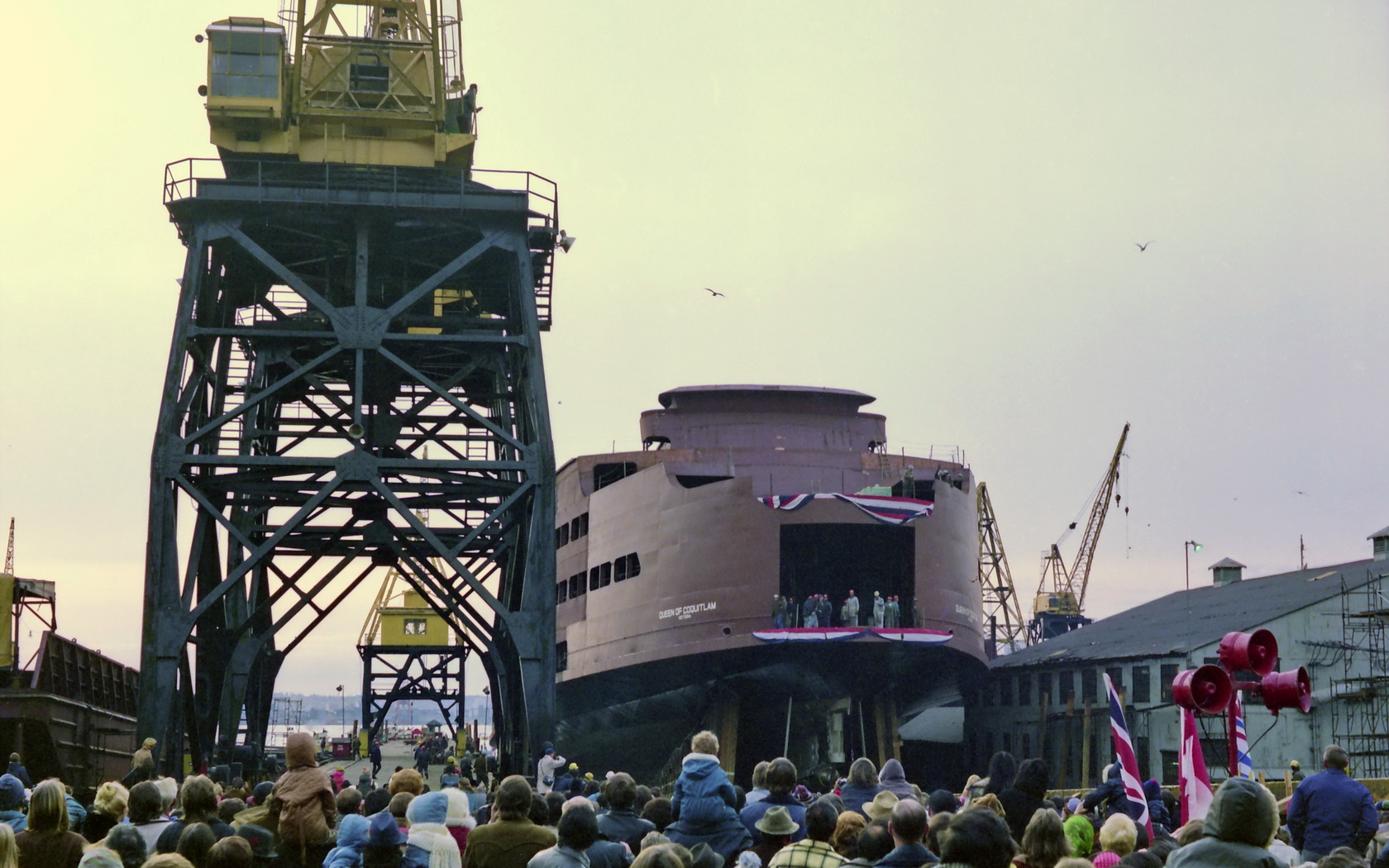
Queen of Coquitlam being launched from the Burrard Dry Dock

The first two C-class ferries built were Queen of Coquitlam and Queen of Cowichan, constructed in 1976. Queen of Oak Bay and Queen of Surrey were built in 1981. There were some minor modifications to the design of the two later ships compared to the earlier C-class ships; most noticeably, Queen of Oak Bay and Queen of Surrey both have longer passenger decks than their older sisters. The C-class vessels were designed by Philip F. Spaulding and are similar to the Jumbo-class ferries he designed for Washington State Ferries several years earlier.

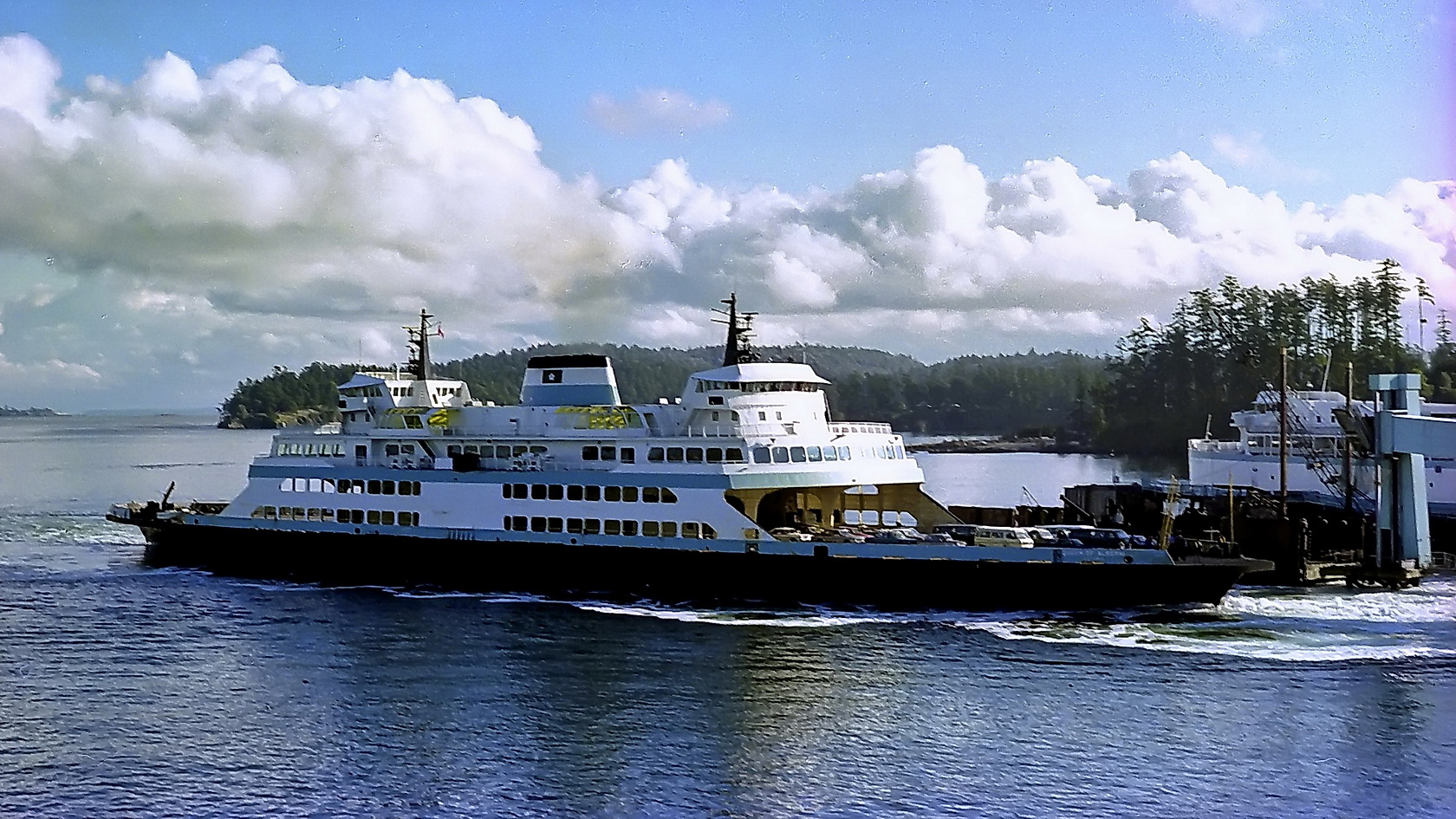
Queen of Alberni arriving at Swartz Bay in 1980

Queen of Alberni was also constructed in 1976 along with the first two C-class vessels. Although this ferry is considered to be a C-class vessel, she is significantly different in layout. She was originally designed to carry only overheight (truck) traffic but in 1984, an upper car deck was installed for 150 non-overheight vehicles. This ferry has a capacity of 280 cars and 1200 passengers and crew, and has a maximum service speed of 22 knots (41 km/h; 25 mph).

Queen of Coquitlam, Queen of Cowichan, Queen of Oak Bay, Queen of Surrey, and Queen of Alberni each received extensive mid-life upgrades in 2003, 2004, 2005, 2006, and 2007, respectively. From engine work to major modifications and improvements, the vessels were refitted to provide an additional 20 years of service.

In July 2018, BC Ferries announced that it had issued a request for proposals to build replacement vessels for all C-class ships, with deliveries beginning in 2024. In 2022, BC Ferries deferred the replacement after it was determined the vessels could be given five-year life extensions beyond their original planned retirement dates. The project is in the design phase, with the first new major vessel currently scheduled to go into service in 2029.

| Vessel | Launched | Length | Displacement | Car capacity | Passengers and crew |
|---|---|---|---|---|---|
| Queen of Coquitlam | 1976 | 139.29 m (457.0 ft) | 6465 tons | 316 | 1494 |
| Queen of Cowichan | 1976 | 139.29 m (457.0 ft) | 6508 tons | 312 | 1494 |
| Queen of Alberni | 1976 | 139.29 m (457.0 ft) | 6422 tons | 280 | 1200 |
| Queen of Oak Bay | 1981 | 139.29 m (457.0 ft) | 6673 tons | 311 | 1494 |
| Queen of Surrey | 1981 | 139.29 m (457.0 ft) | 6556 tons | 311 | 1494 |

== Routes ==
C-class ferries are double-ended; they have a separate bridge at each end and therefore are not required to turn around during the sailing. These ferries generally run on the Duke Point–Tsawwassen, Horseshoe Bay–Departure Bay and Horseshoe Bay–Langdale routes. At one time, these ferries operated on the Swartz Bay–Tsawwassen route, but due to limitations placed on their speed when transiting Active Pass—after an accident they were required to operate in the more manoeuvrable docking mode rather than cruising mode—it is no longer feasible to run them on that route.

== Incidents and accidents ==
On August 9, 1979, Queen of Alberni was transiting through Active Pass when it ran aground on Galiano Island, tipping fifteen degrees to starboard. Several large commercial vehicles on board the vessel at the time were damaged. No persons were injured, but a racehorse onboard was killed.

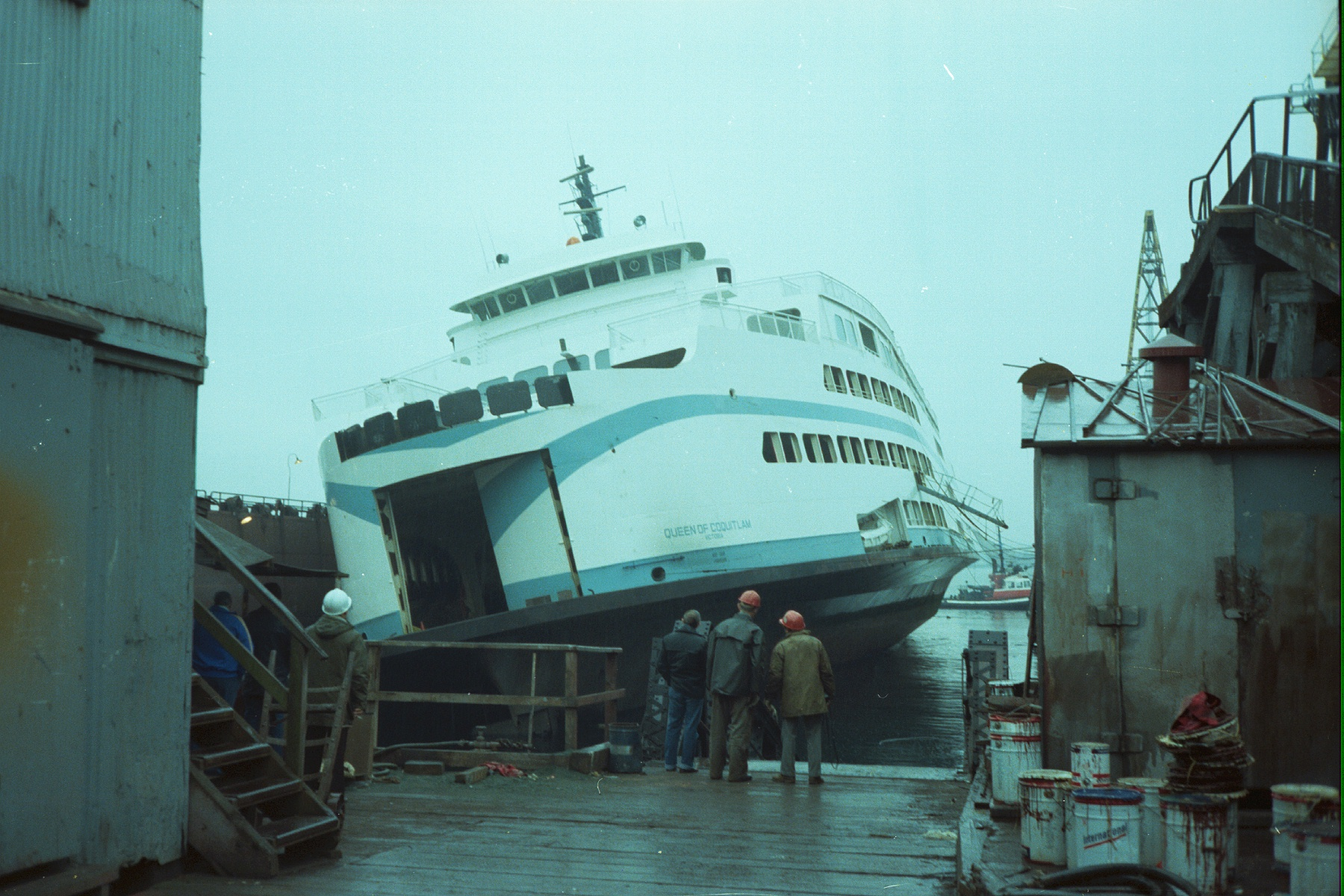
The Queen of Coquitlam tipped over due to a leak while in dry dock

On October 19, 1980, Queen of Coquitlam tipped over and landed on her side in the Burrard Shipyards drydock during a maintenance layover, causing approximately CA$3 million in damage. She also gained the distinction of being the only BC Ferries vessel to have issued a mayday from drydock.

On September 21, 1995, Queen of Cowichan experienced an escalator accident where unsupervised students, poor signage, and inadequate surveillance led to congestion, falls, and injuries during disembarkation.

In June 1989, Queen of Alberni collided with the loading dock at Departure Bay causing significant damage to the ship and dock. Six people were injured including a cook who suffered a fractured cheekbone as he was walking down a set of stairs.

On March 12, 1992, Queen of Alberni collided with the Japanese freighter Shinwa Maru southwest of Tsawwassen. The collision occurred in heavy fog, with both vessels suffering minor damage. Injuries included 2 serious and 25 minor injuries for the 260 people on the ferry, while none of the 11 people aboard the freighter received injuries.

In October 1994, Queen of Surrey crashed into the dock at Horseshoe Bay, causing $200,000 in damage.

On October 20, 1995, Queen of Coquitlam experienced an engine shut-down while approaching Horseshoe Bay. She crashed into a dock at the terminal resulting in light damage.

On December 15, 2001, Queen of Alberni got caught in a heavy wind storm which turned a regular 2-hour crossing into a 7 1/2-hour ordeal.

On May 12, 2003, Queen of Surrey was disabled as a result of an engine room fire. Queen of Capilano was tethered to Queen of Surrey while tugboats were dispatched. The vessel was then towed back to shore. None of the 318 passengers were injured, but several crew members were treated for minor injuries. Some buckling of the main car deck resulted from the heat of the fire. However, no vehicles were damaged in the incident.

On July 31, 2003, Queen of Surrey experienced a mechanical problem with one of its propellers. As a result, she was removed from service for emergency dry-docking to facilitate repairs, which took about five days.

On June 30, 2005, Queen of Oak Bay lost power while approaching the Horseshoe Bay ferry terminal. After the captain gave ample warning, the ship coasted into the nearby Sewell's Marina, where it overran more than a dozen boats before running aground. No one was injured, and the ferry sustained only minor scraping to a rudder and propeller blade. See MV Queen of Oak Bay for extensive details on this accident.
