= MV Queen of Coquitlam =

1976 Canadian ferry

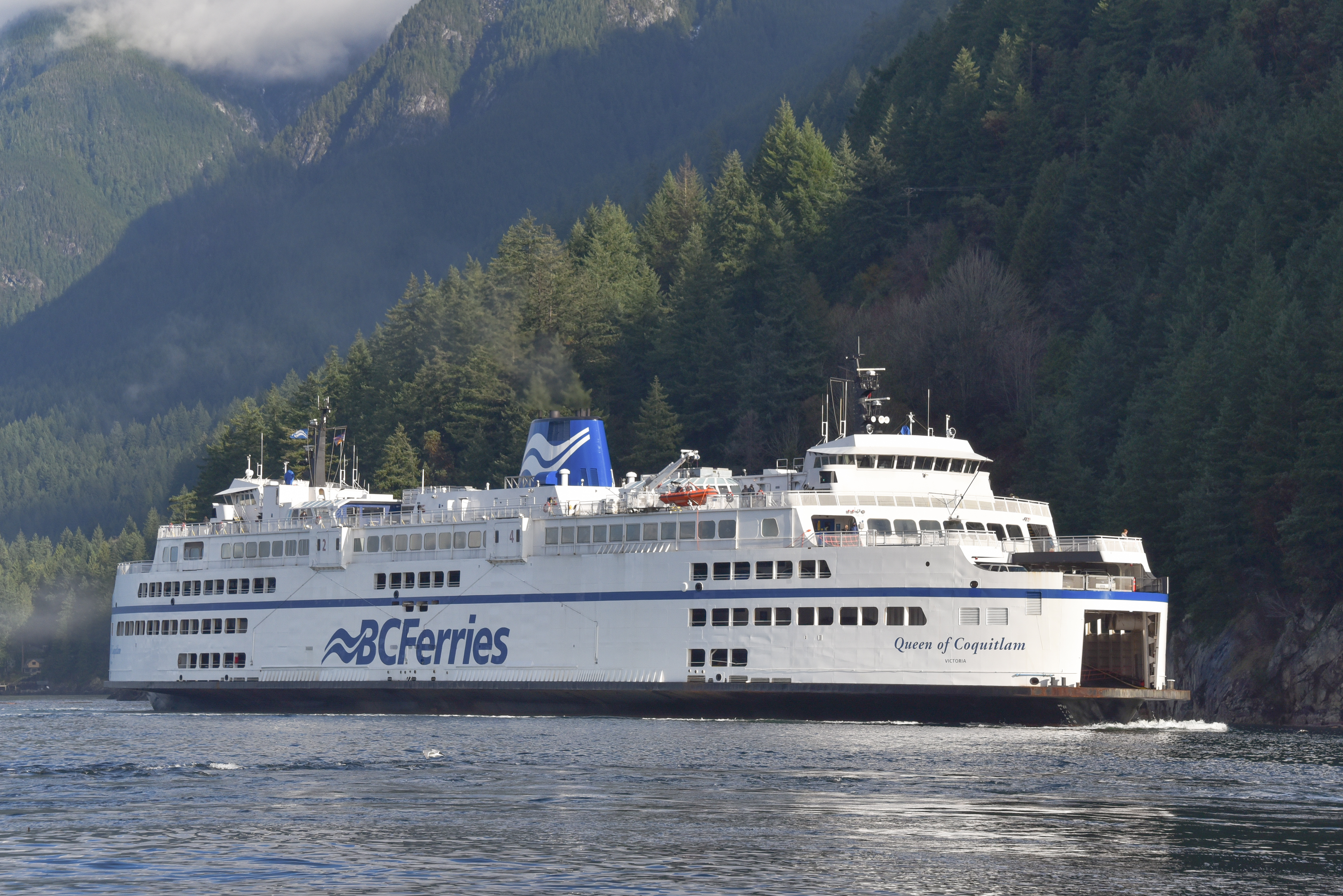
- BC Ferries MV Queen of Coquitlam, arriving at Horseshoe Bay

History

Canada
- Name: Queen of Coquitlam
- Namesake: Coquitlam, British Columbia
- Owner: BC Ferries
- Operator: BC Ferries
- Route: Departure Bay - Horseshoe Bay Horseshoe Bay - Langdale
- Ordered: March 1974
- Builder: Burrard Yarrows Corp., North Vancouver
- Cost: CA$20 million (1974) (equivalent to CA$125 million in 2025)
- Launched: December 1975
- Completed: July 1976
- In service: 1976
- Refit: 2003
- Home port: Vancouver, British Columbia
- Identification: Official No: 0370060; IMO number: 7411155; MMSI number: 316001249; Call sign: CZ8058
- Status: ship in active service

General characteristics
- Class & type: C-class RORO ferry
- Tonnage: 6,503
- Length: 139 m (456 ft)
- Beam: 27.08 m (88.8 ft)
- Draft: 5.331 m (17.49 ft)
- Decks: 3 car decks, 1 passenger deck, 1 sun deck
- Installed power: 11,860 hp (8,840 kW)
- Propulsion: Two MaK 12M551AK
- Speed: 20.5 knots (38.0 km/h; 23.6 mph)
- Capacity: 1,470 passengers; 362 cars; 345.0 tonnes diesel fuel
- Crew: 30

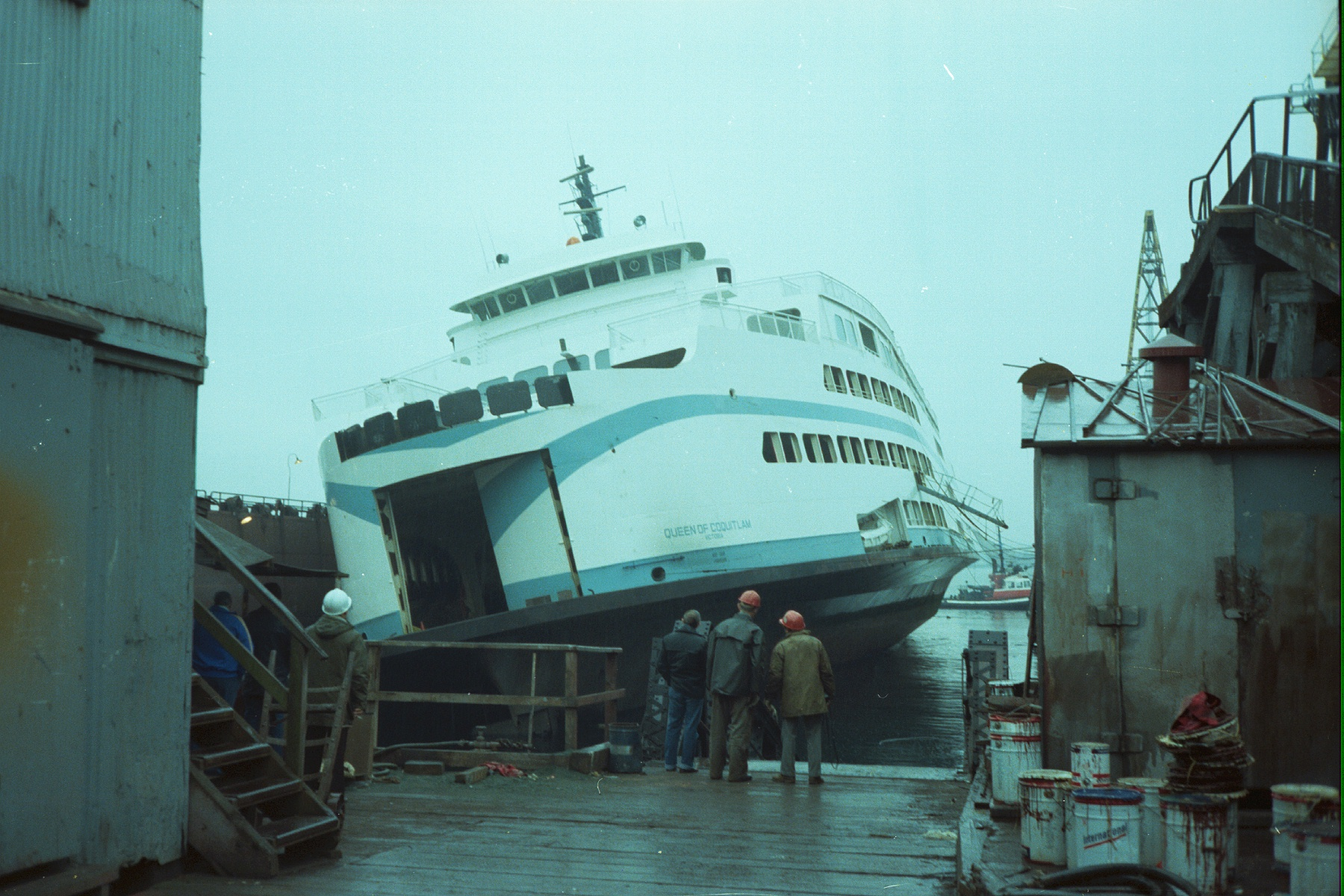
Ferry tipped over in 1980 due to leak in dry dock.

MV Queen of Coquitlam is a C-class ferry in the BC Ferries fleet, launched in 1976. She first operated on BC Ferries' Horseshoe Bay to Departure Bay route. For most of her life, she has been a replacement/relief vessel on all the major routes serving Metro Vancouver. She is named for the city of Coquitlam.

This ship has the distinction of being the only BC Ferries vessel to have issued a mayday from dry dock when, during a 1980 maintenance layover, she tipped in the Burrard Shipyards drydock, causing approximately CAD $3 million in damage. In November 2002, she started a major rehabilitation that would extend her service life by another 20 years. The refurbishment, costing CAD $18 million, improved her passenger services with some minor work to her engineering. Additionally, over 100 tonnes of steel was either added or replaced, and four evacuation stations were installed. She returned to service by June 2003.

Upon return, Queen of Coquitlam started regular service on Horseshoe Bay-Departure Bay route. Queen of Oak Bay, which had a similar refit to Queen of Coquitlam, displaced her from her route in the early Summer 2005. She currently operates as a secondary vessel on Langdale - Horseshoe Bay in the summer, as well as a replacement vessel for any of the other C class or Super C-class vessels when they are sent for refitting.

== Statistics ==
- Length: 139.29 m (457 ft)
- Beam (width): 27 m (89 ft)
- Decks ASL: 6
- Draught (depth): 6 m (20 ft)
- Tonnage: 6,551.18
- Engines: 2 × MaK 12M551AK 6,000 hp (4.5 MW) each maximum
- Power 11,860 hp (8.84 MW)
- Service Speed: 19 to 22 knots (35 to 41 km/h)
- Cars: 362
- Passengers: 1,466
- Crew: 34
- Route: Langdale-Horseshoe Bay (summer)

== See also ==
- Queen of Cowichan
- Queen of Alberni
- Queen of Surrey
