= Whytecliff Park =

Park in West Vancouver, British Columbia

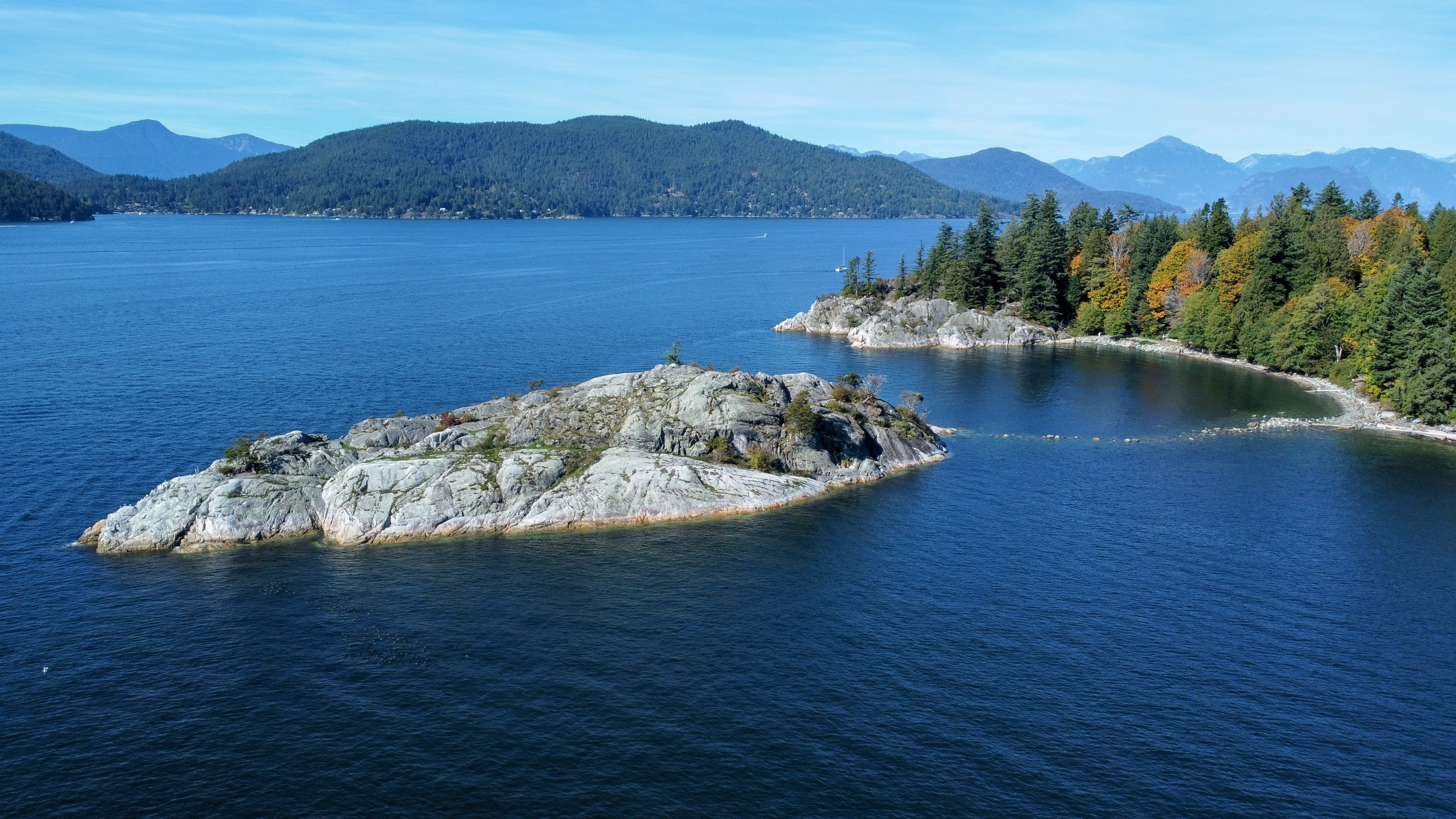
- Aerial view of Whytecliff Park
- Interactive map of Whytecliff Park
- Type: Municipal
- Location: West Vancouver
- Coordinates: 49.374005°N 123.288832°W
- Area: 15.63 hectares (0.1563 km^{2}; 0.0603 sq mi)
- Operator: District of West Vancouver
- Status: Open all year
- Website: westvancouver.ca/parks-recreation/parks-trails/whytecliff-park

Whytecliff Park is located in West Vancouver, British Columbia, Canada, near the Horseshoe Bay neighbourhood, which was originally named White Cliff City when it was first settled in 1909. The park is currently home to more than 200 marine animal species and is the first Marine Protected Area in Canada. Sea lions can be seen sunbathing on the beach during summer.

== History ==
In 1914, Colonel Albert Whyte pressed for the spelling change from White Cliff City to Whytecliff. The Whytecliff area is now distinct from Horseshoe Bay. The park, originally Rockcliffe Park, was developed by W.W. Boultbee in 1926, and a private access road was cut from the Marine Drive highway at Batchelor Bay.

The fifty-acre Boultbee estate was purchased by the Union Steamship Company in 1939 and the company operated a Bowen Island Ferry from Whytecliff during 1939–41 and 1946–1952
