= CGS Kestrel =

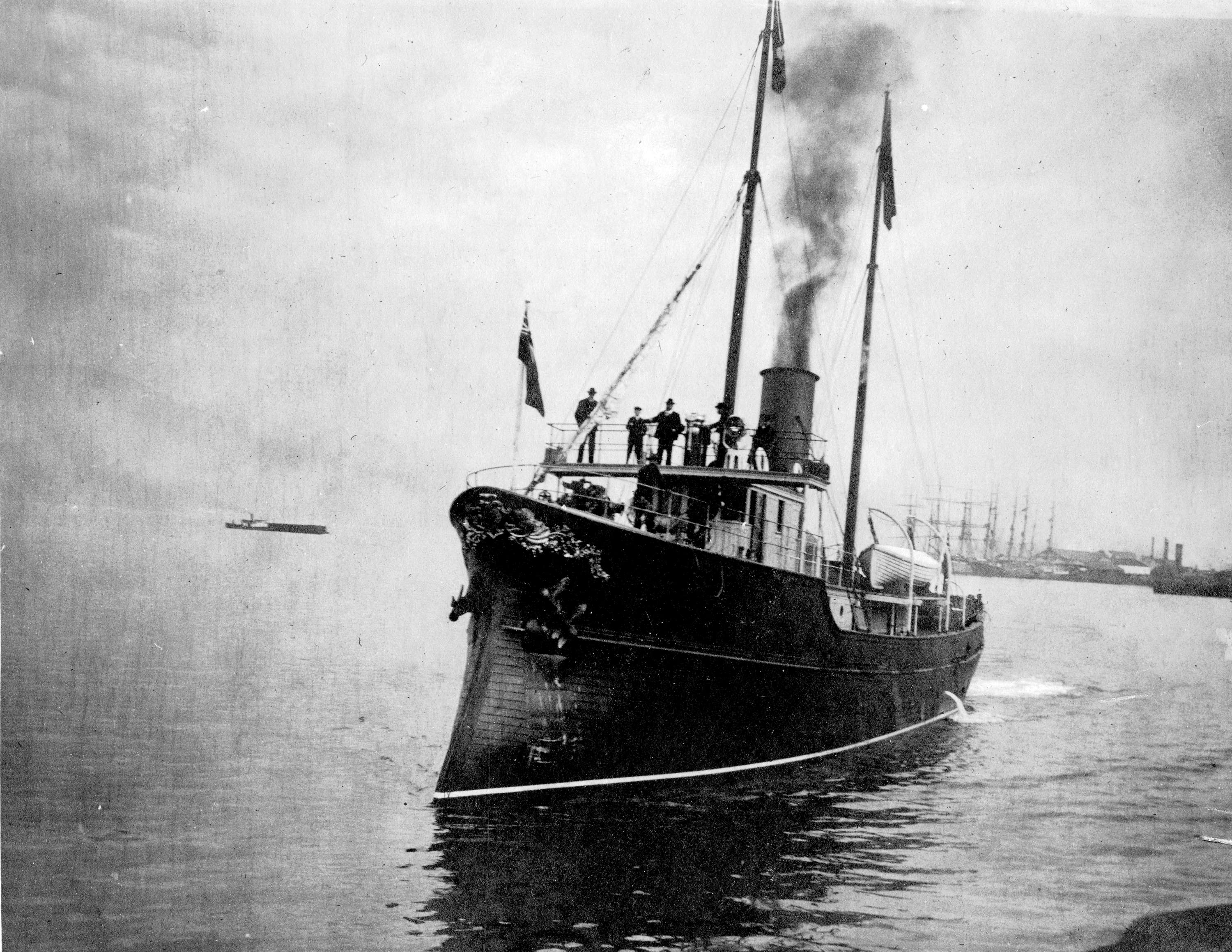
- Kestrel in False Creek

History

Canada
- Name: Kestrel
- Builder: Alfred Wallace, Vancouver
- Yard number: 14
- Completed: February 1903
- In service: 1903
- Out of service: 1919
- Fate: Sold, 1912, broken up 1931

General characteristics
- Type: Fisheries protection vessel
- Tonnage: 311 GRT
- Length: 126.5 ft (38.6 m)
- Beam: 24 ft (7.3 m)
- Draught: 12 ft (3.7 m)
- Propulsion: Compound steam engine, 59 hp (44 kW) (nominal)

CGS Kestrel (Note: CGS stands for Canadian Government Ship) was employed as a Government of Canada Fisheries Protection vessel on the Pacific Coast. Completed in 1899 by Alfred Wallace shipyards in Vancouver, British Columbia she entered into service in 1903 and remained in government service after the creation of the Royal Canadian Navy in 1910 until she was sold in 1912. The vessel was broken up in 1931.

== Description ==
Her design was influenced by the Curlew class of fisheries protection cruisers, but Kestrel's hull was built of wood. The vessel was 126.5 feet (38.6 m) long overall with a beam of 24 feet (7.3 m) and a draught of 12 feet (3.7 m). The vessel had a tonnage of 311 gross register tons (GRT) and was powered by a compound steam engine driving one shaft creating 59 horsepower (44 kW) (nominal). The ship was operated by a crew of 20.

== Service history ==
Kestrel was constructed by Alfred Wallace shipyard in Vancouver, British Columbia with the yard number 14. The vessel was completed in February 1903. Used by the Canadian government as a fisheries patrol vessel on the Pacific Coast of Canada and registered in Ottawa, Ontario, Kestrel was in service from 1903 to 1912. The vessel was sold in 1912 to Charles N. & F. P. Armstrong, with the ship's name and registry remaining the same. Kestrel was sold again in 1918 to Fanning Island Ltd., keeping her name and registry. The vessel was broken up in the third quarter of 1931.
