= Queen of Oak Bay =

1981 Canadian ferry

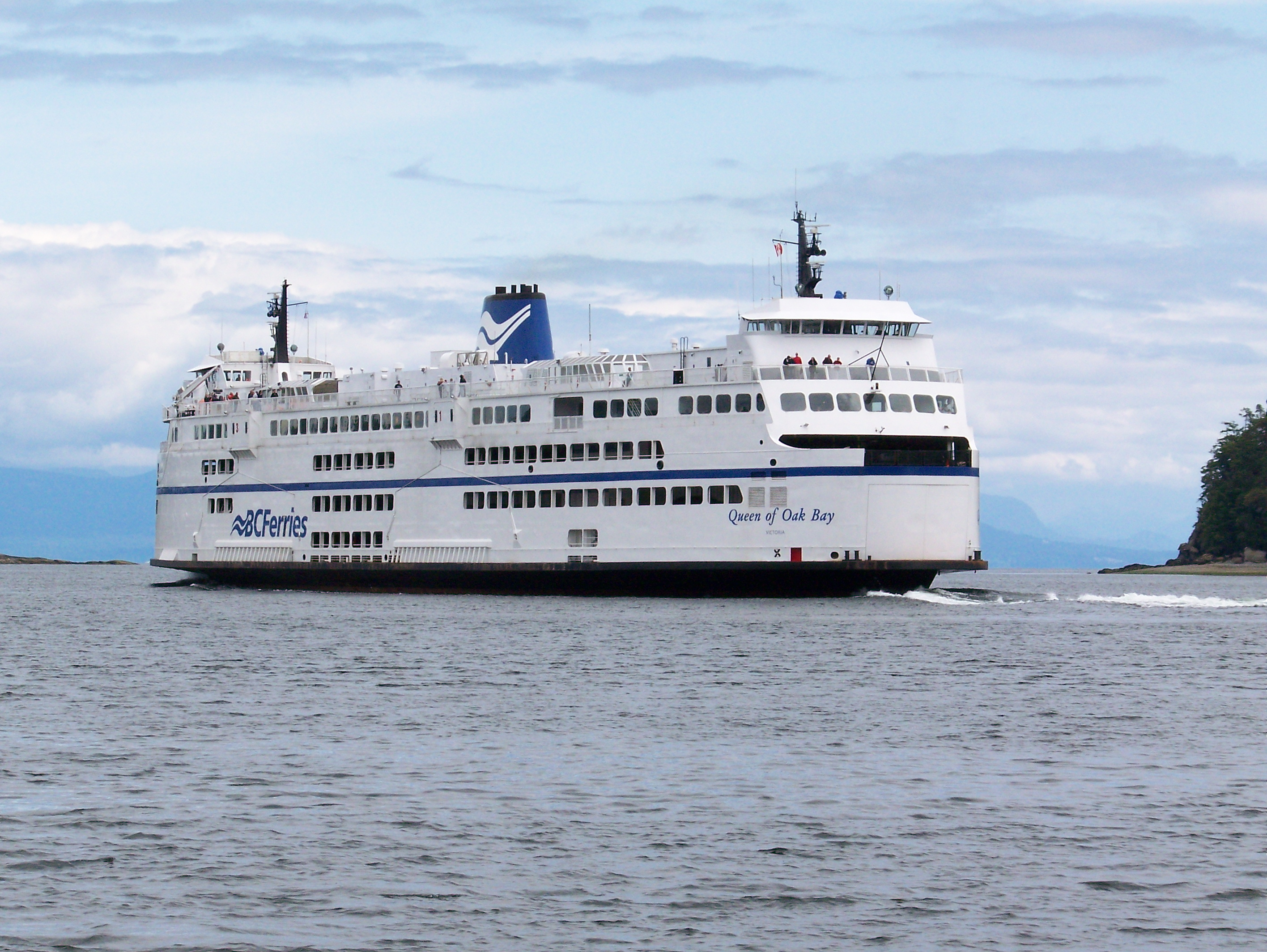
- Queen of Oak Bay departs the Departure Bay ferry terminal in June 200.

History
- Name: Queen of Oak Bay
- Operator: BC Ferries
- Port of registry: Victoria Canada
- Route: Horseshoe Bay to Departure Bay
- Builder: Burrard Yarrows, Victoria
- Completed: 1981, upgraded 2005
- Identification: IMO number: 7902283; MMSI number: 316001257; Official number: 396065; Callsign: VG8234

General characteristics
- Class & type: C-class double-ended roll-on/roll-off ferry
- Tonnage: 6,968.91 tons
- Length: 139.29 m (457 ft)
- Beam: 27 m (89 ft)
- Draft: 6 m (20 ft)
- Installed power: 11,840 hp (8,830 kW)
- Propulsion: 2 × MaK 12M551AK
- Speed: 19–22 knots (35–41 km/h; 22–25 mph)
- Capacity: 1,466 passengers; 362 vehicles
- Crew: 34

Queen of Oak Bay is a double-ended C-class roll-on/roll-off ferry in the BC Ferries fleet, launched in 1981 at Victoria, British Columbia. The 139.29-metre (457 ft) long, 6,969-ton vessel has a capacity for 362 cars and over 1,500 passengers and crew. She normally operates on BC Ferries' Horseshoe Bay to Departure Bay (Nanaimo) route, part of the Trans-Canada Highway. She is named for the municipality of Oak Bay.

== Mid-life upgrade ==
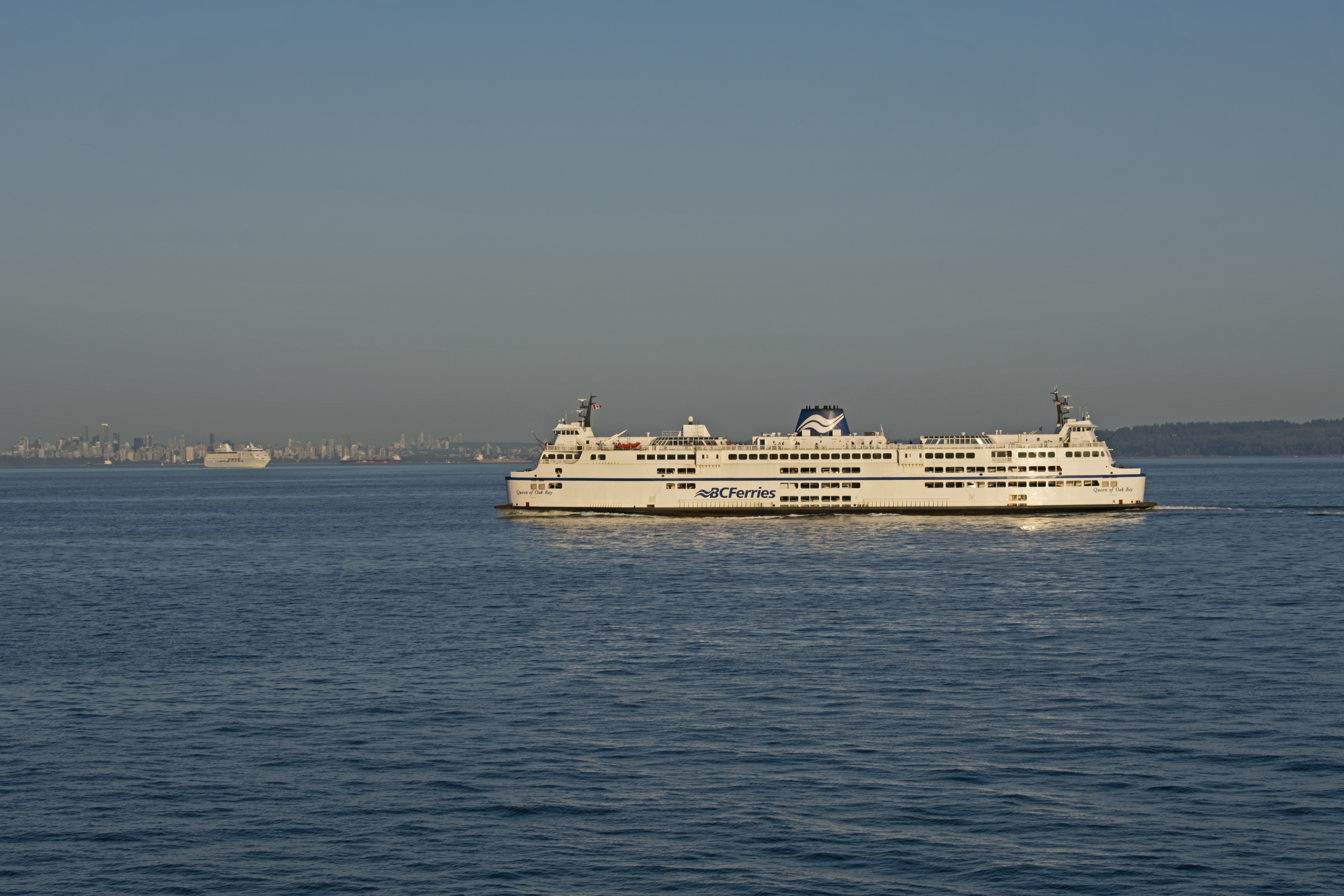
Queen of Oak Bay in 2019, with English Bay and the city of Vancouver at the background.

The vessel underwent a $35 million mid-life upgrade in early 2005 at Vancouver Drydock Company in North Vancouver. The project prepared the vessel for another 20 years of service with upgrades to engineering components, lifesaving equipment and improvements to onboard services. Major maintenance work included steel replacement, piping and cable renewal, hull sandblasting and extensive painting. The vessel was outfitted with four state-of-the art marine evacuation systems, supplemented by two rescue boats and eight life rafts. She returned to service on June 13, 2005.

== 2005 grounding ==
On June 30, 2005, at about 10:10 in the morning (17:10 UTC), Queen of Oak Bay lost power four minutes before she was to dock at the Horseshoe Bay terminal. The vessel became adrift, unable to change speed, but able to steer with the rudders. The horn was blown steadily and an announcement telling passengers to brace for impact was made minutes before the ship slowly ran into the nearby Sewell's Marina, where she destroyed or damaged 28 pleasure craft and subsequently went aground a short distance from the shore. No casualties or injuries were reported.

On July 1, 2005, BC Ferries issued a statement that Transport Canada, the Transportation Safety Board, and Lloyd's Register of Shipping were reviewing the control and mechanical systems on board to find a fault. An inspection revealed minimal damage to the ship, with only some minor damage to a metal fender, paint scrapes to the rudder, and some minor scrapes to one blade of a propeller.

On July 7, 2005, BC Ferries concluded that a missing cotter pin was to blame. The pin normally retained a nut on a linkage between an engine speed governor and the fuel control for one of the engines. Without the pin, the nut fell off and the linkage separated, causing the engine, clutches, and propellers to increase in speed until overspeed safety devices tripped and shut down the entire propulsion system. The faulty speed governor had been serviced 17 days before the incident during a $35-million upgrade and the cotter pin was not properly replaced at that time.

The vessel was quickly repaired and tested at sea trials. She returned to regular service on July 8, 2005. A complete investigation report consisting of a 14-page Divisional Inquiry and a 28-page Engineering Incident Investigation was finally released in September 2006.

The Transportation Safety Board's Marine Investigation Report, released on September 6, 2007, indicated that "inadequacies in BC Ferries' procedures on safety-critical maintenance tasks and on ship handling during berthing operations" were major contributing factors to the accident. It appears that insufficient oversight of work done by contractors also played a role in the accident.
