= Queen of Surrey =

BC Ferries C-class ferry

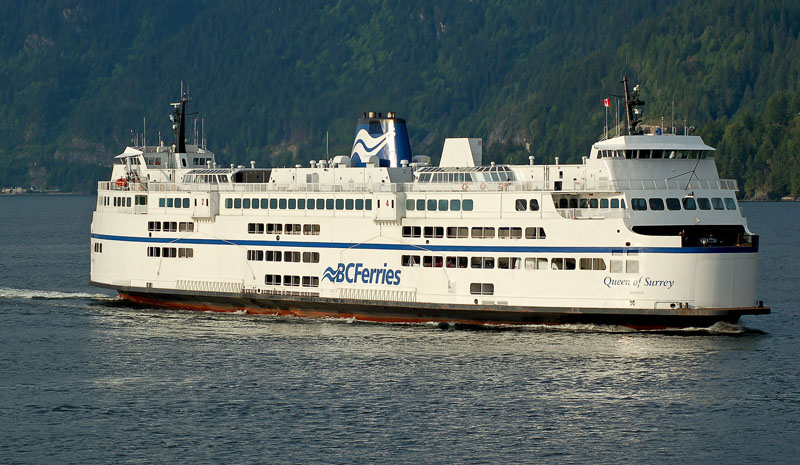
- Queen of Surrey approaching Horseshoe Bay

History
- Name: Queen of Surrey
- Operator: BC Ferries
- Port of registry: Canada
- Route: Horseshoe Bay to Langdale
- Builder: Burrard Yarrows Corp., North Vancouver
- Yard number: 100
- Launched: 27 August 1980
- Completed: May 1981
- Identification: IMO number: 7902221; MMSI number: 316001262; Official number: 396048; Callsign: VG8177
- Status: In service

General characteristics as built
- Class & type: C-class double-ended roll-on/roll-off
- Tonnage: 6,969 GRT; 1,099 DWT
- Length: 139.4 m (457 ft 4 in) oa; 127.2 m (417 ft 4 in) pp
- Beam: 27.6 m (90 ft 7 in)
- Draught: 5.7 m (18 ft 8 in)
- Installed power: 11,860 hp (8,840 kW)
- Propulsion: 2 × MaK 12M551AK diesel engines
- Speed: 20.5 knots (38.0 km/h; 23.6 mph)
- Capacity: 1,494 passengers & crew; 308 vehicles

Queen of Surrey is a double-ended C-class roll-on/roll-off ferry in the BC Ferries fleet. The ship was launched in 1980 and entered service in 1981. The ferry normally operates on BC Ferries' Horseshoe Bay to Langdale route. She is named for the city of Surrey. On 12 May 2003, Queen of Surrey suffered an engine fire that disabled the ferry in Howe Sound. No one was injured and the ship was returned to service. In 2004, the ferry was involved in a collision with a tugboat, and in 2019 she struck a fixed structure at the Langdale terminal. The 2019 crash lead to passengers being stranded on the vessel for over ten hours.

== Description ==
Queen of Surrey is a C-class double-ended roll-on/roll-off ferry that was 139.4 m (457 ft 4 in) long overall and 127.2 m (417 ft 4 in) between perpendiculars with a beam of 27.6 m (90 ft 7 in), a gross register tonnage (GRT) of 6,969 and a deadweight tonnage (DWT) of 1,099 as built. The ship has a maximum draught of 5.7 m (18 ft 8 in). As of 2018 the vessel was remeasured with a gross tonnage (GT) of 6,968.91, a net tonnage of 4,473.47 with a length of 126.86 metres (416 ft 2 in), a beam of 27.58 metres (90 ft 6 in) and a depth of 6.40 metres (21 ft 0 in). Queen of Surrey is propelled by two MaK 12M551AK diesel engines rated at 11,860 horsepower (8,840 kW) driving two propellers, one forward and one aft. This gives the vessel a maximum speed of 20.5 knots (38.0 km/h; 23.6 mph).

The ship has a capacity of 308 cars and 1,494 passengers and crew. In place of individual cars, Queen of Surrey is capable of loading twelve semi-trailer trucks. The vehicle deck is divided into three sections with two longitudinal casings. The deck has 4.8 metres (15 ft 9 in) of headroom. Four lanes in the centre of the deck can be used by trucks or cars, while two outboards lanes and two lanes on the gallery deck are for cars only, and reached by fixed ramps. On the upper deck, there are eight lanes for cars, reached only from a shore-based ramp. Amenities aboard the ferry include a Coastal Cafe, Coast Cafe Express, gift shop, kids zone, pet area, elevators and accessible washrooms.

=== Mid-life upgrade ===
In 2006, Queen of Surrey underwent a $40 million mid-life upgrade at the Washington Marine Group's Vancouver Drydock in North Vancouver. The project prepared the vessel for another 20 years of service with significant mechanical and safety improvements, as well as upgraded passenger amenities and the installation of new emergency evacuation equipment. Major work included steel replacement, electrical upgrades, and modernization of elevators, heating, ventilation and air conditioning systems. Remodelled and expanded areas included the gift shop, food service facilities, washrooms, and seating areas.

== Construction and career ==
The vessel was ordered in May 1979, and constructed by Burrard Yarrows Corporation at their yard in North Vancouver, British Columbia and given the yard number 100. The ferry cost US$29.0 million to build. Queen of Surrey was launched on 27 August 1980, and delivered to BC Ferries in April 1981. The vessel was assigned the Horseshoe Bay to Langdale route.

On 12 May 2003, the vessel was disabled in Howe Sound as a result of a diesel oil fire in the No.2 engine room. Queen of Capilano was sent to aid the damaged vessel and tethered to Queen of Surrey while tugboats were dispatched. The vessel was then towed back to shore. None of the 318 passengers were injured, but several crew members were treated for minor injuries. Some buckling of the main car deck resulted from the heat of the fire. However, no vehicles were damaged in the incident. Inferior copper piping and the removal of a heat shield in the engine room were identified as the main causes of the fire. She returned to service on 17 July 2003.

On 31 July 2003, the vessel experienced a mechanical problem with one of her propellers. As a result, she was removed from service for emergency dry-docking to facilitate repairs, which took about five days. On 11 January 2004, Queen of Surrey collided with the tugboat Charles H. Cates V at Horseshoe Bay, trapping the tugboat between the ferry and the dock. Charles H. Cates V sustained significant damage, but made it to Vancouver Harbour to undergo repairs. In October 2005, the ferry collided with the dock at Tsawwassen, British Columbia after the captain misjudged the wind and tides.

In 2006 the ferry underwent a mid-life upgrade. She returned to service on 27 June 2006. On 8 September 2010, thieves attempted to steal an automated teller machine (ATM) from the ferry while Queen of Surrey was docked overnight at Gibsons, British Columbia. During the attempted theft, the thieves dropped the ATM into the water. The ATM was later recovered. On 30 June 2017, the ferry suffered minor damage after a driver drove their Chevrolet Blazer SUV through the dock gates and launched the vehicle onto the ferry's car deck.

On 26 March 2019 Queen of Surrey missed the berth at Langdale terminal and struck the Stormaway dock. The vessel then became stuck and was subsequently incapable of disembarking the passengers and vehicles aboard. A tugboat was called to assist the ferry in maneuvering to the terminal to allow foot and vehicle passenger to disembark after being stuck for nearly ten hours. The vessel was eventually dislodged from the terminal after part of the lower car deck was cut away.
