= I-class ferry =

Class of vessels in the BC Ferries fleet

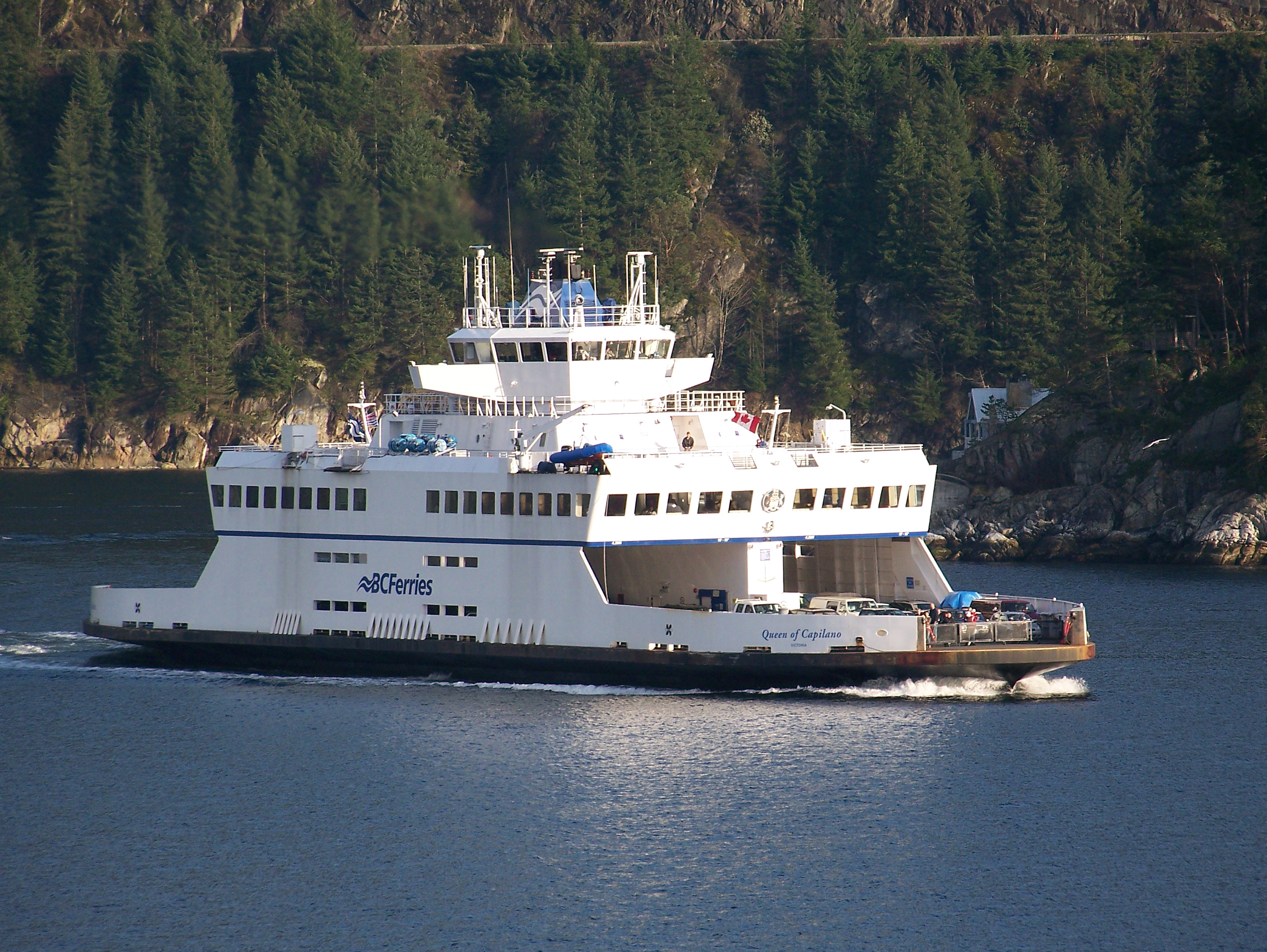
- MV Queen of Capilano in 2008

Class overview
- Builders: Vancouver Shipyards, North Vancouver
- Operators: BC Ferries
- Completed: 3
- Active: 3

BC Ferries operates three Intermediate-class ferries:

MV Queen of Capilano (1991)

- 100 vehicles since Jan 2015 mid-life refit
- 462 passengers
- 96 metre length
- 2,500 gross tons
- 12.5 kts
- 7305 HP
- Route: Horseshoe Bay ↔ Bowen Island

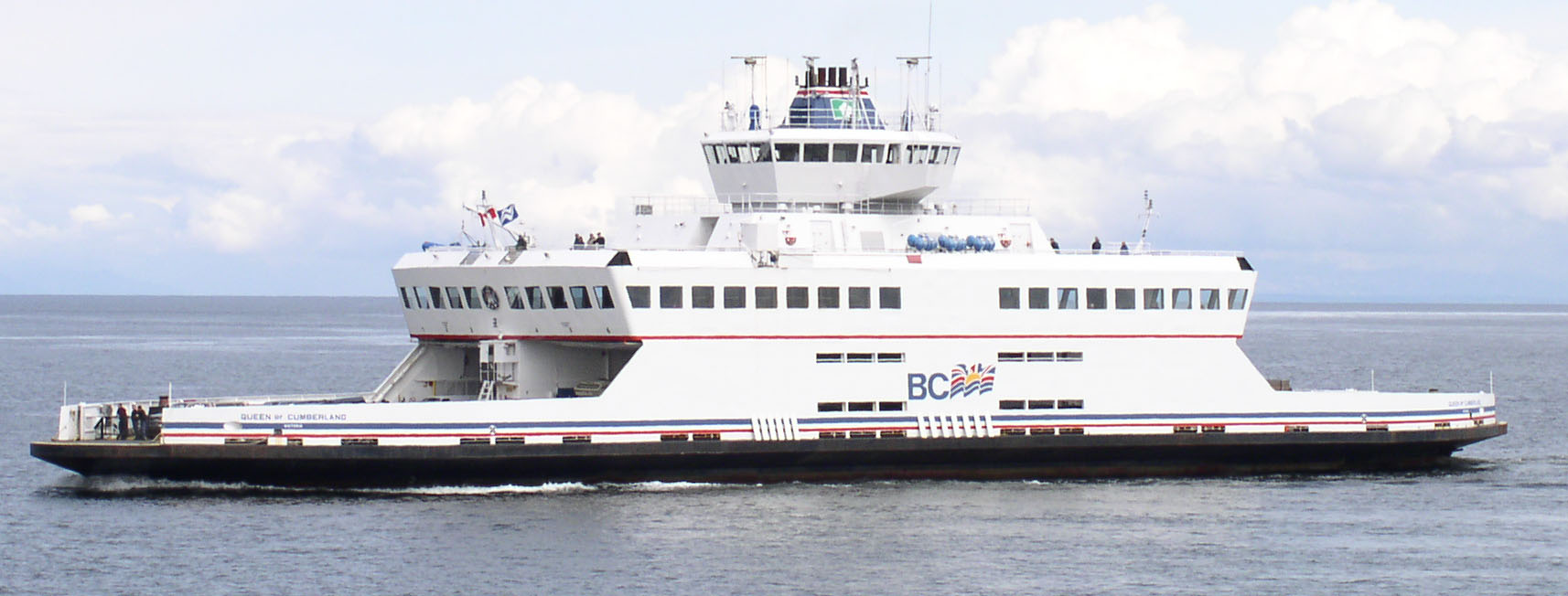
MV Queen of Cumberland on April 18, 2003

MV Queen of Cumberland (1992)

- 76 vehicles
- 462 passengers
- 96 metre length
- 2,662 gross tons
- 12.5 kts
- 7305 HP
- Route: Swartz Bay ↔ Southern Gulf Islands

MV Malaspina Sky (2008)

- Was renamed from MV Island Sky on October 24, 2019
- 125 vehicles
- 450 passengers
- 102 metres length
- 3,397 gross tons
- 15.5 kts
- 7094 HP
- Route: Earl's Cove ↔ Saltery Bay

All three ferries were built at Vancouver Shipyards of the Washington Marine Group in North Vancouver, British Columbia.
