= Burrard Dry Dock =

Shipyard in Vancouver, British Columbia, Canada

Coordinates: 49.309000°N 123.0795°W

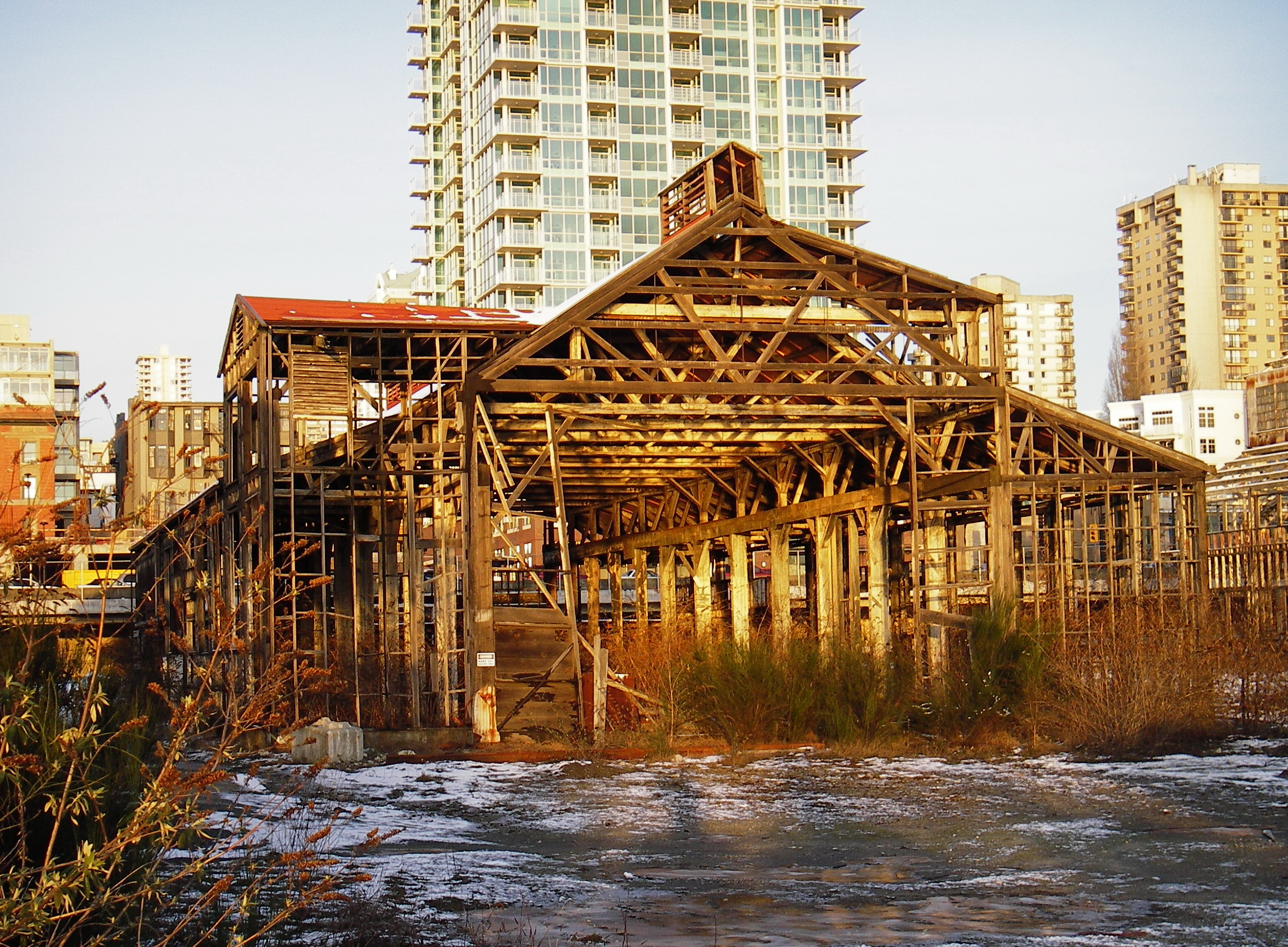
The remains of Burrard Dry Dock

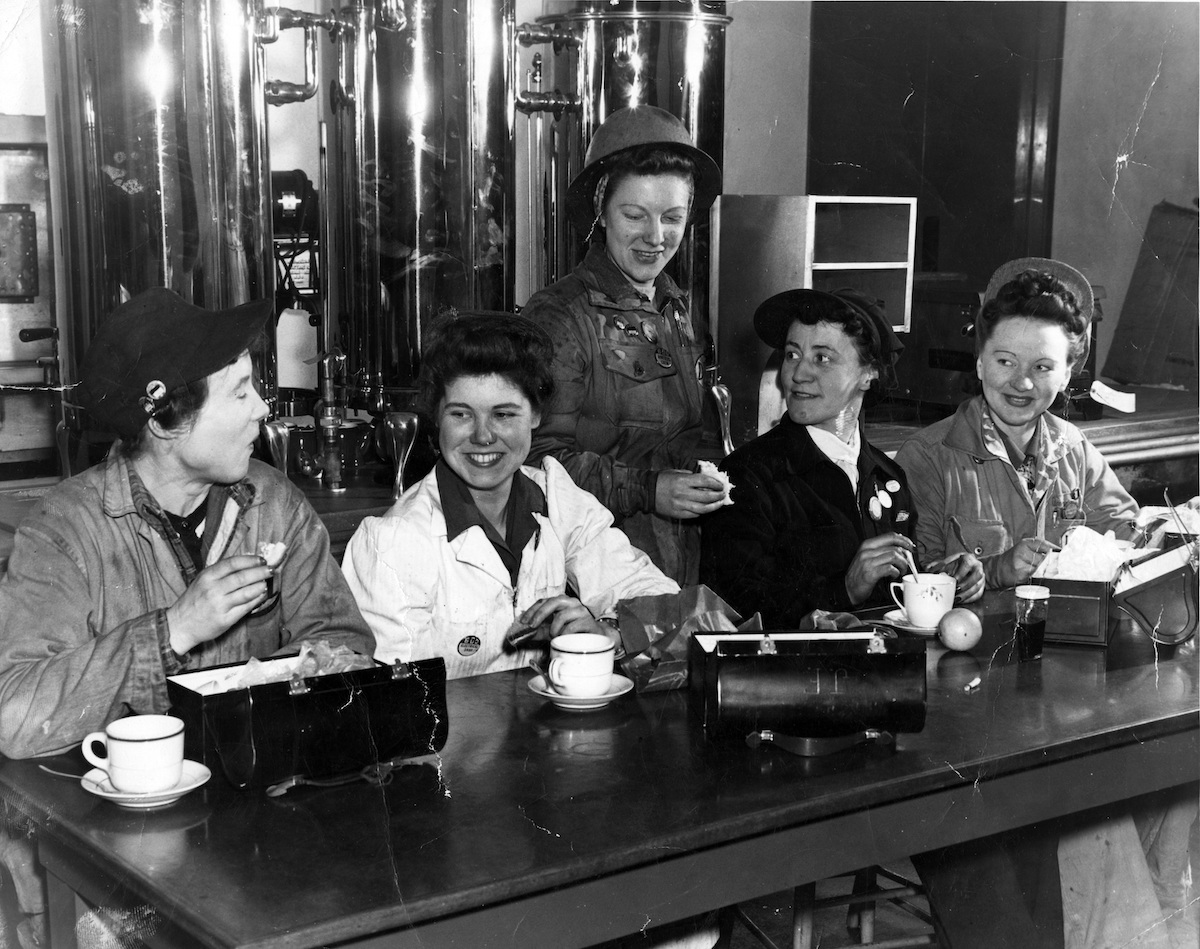
Women shop stewards at the Burrard Dry Dock in 1942

Burrard Dry Dock Ltd. was a Canadian shipbuilding company headquartered in North Vancouver, British Columbia. Together with neighbouring North Van Ship Repair and Yarrows Ltd. of Esquimalt, which were both later purchased by the company, Burrard built and refitted over 450 ships, including many warships for the Royal Navy and Royal Canadian Navy during the First and Second World Wars.

== History ==
- 1894 – Alfred "Andy" Wallace begins building wooden fish boats at False Creek area of Vancouver, British Columbia. These boatworks burned down in 1909 and was abandoned.
- 1905 – Wallace Shipyards is incorporated. The following year the company establishes a new, larger shipyard at the foot of Lonsdale Avenue in North Vancouver.
- 1911 – July 11, the shipyard is destroyed by fire but is immediately rebuilt.
- 1914–18 – During the First World War, Wallace Shipyards is contracted to make shells for 18-pounder guns, then builds 6 large cargo schooners and 3 freighters – the first deep-sea steel-hulled ships built in Canada – for the merchant marine. To build the wooden schooners, Number 2 Yard is established west of the Squamish Indian Band reserve (now the site of the North Shore Auto Mall). In 1917, Wallace leases Number 2 yard to the William Lyall Shipbuilding Company, which ultimately built 27 wooden ships there before it closes in 1920.
- 1921 – Wallace Shipyards becomes Burrard Dry Dock Company. Four years later, the company installs the first floating drydock in Vancouver.
- 1928 – Burrard Dry Dock builds the St. Roch, the first ship to travel the Northwest Passage from the Pacific Ocean to the Atlantic Ocean, and the first ship to circumnavigate North America.
- 1929 – Clarence Wallace becomes president following the death of his father Alfred.
- 1940–45 – Burrard Dry Dock becomes the busiest Canadian shipyard during the Second World War, building 109 "Park" and "Fort" Liberty-class freighters, along with assorted corvettes, minesweepers and LSTs, and several Admiralty maintenance ships, such as the Beachy Head class. The company opens a second shipyard, South Yard, at the foot of McLean Avenue in Vancouver to help meet the wartime demand. Burrard Dry Dock also converts and outfits 19 escort carriers for the Royal Navy. Employment peaks at 14,000 workers, including 1,000 women.)
- 1946 – Yarrows Ltd. of Esquimalt, BC is acquired from Yarrow Shipbuilders of the United Kingdom.
- 1951 – The adjacent North Vancouver Ship Repairs shipyard is acquired.
- 1967 – In a move to consolidate the shipbuilding industry on the Pacific Coast, Burrard Dry Dock acquires the assets of Victoria Machinery Depot in Victoria, British Columbia and immediately closes its shipyard.
- 1972 – The Wallace family sells the shipyard to Cornat Industries, part of Vancouver-based and privately held Canadian Forest Products (Canfor) conglomerate. The ship yards were consolidated and renamed Burrard-Yarrows Group, later Burrard Yarrows Corporation.
- 1982 – Panamax class drydock, related cranes, and machine shop are completed in North Vancouver.
- 1985 – Burrard-Yarrows Corporation becomes Versatile Pacific Shipyards
- 1992 – Cancellation of the Polar 8 Project leads to bankruptcy of Versatile Pacific Shipyards. The North Vancouver shipyard is closed and the last employees are laid off. The floating drydocks along with support buildings at the eastern end of the shipyard are acquired by a new company, Vancouver Drydock, which is still in operation today.
- 1993 – The Esquimalt shipyard closes. The following year its assets are taken over by Victoria Shipyard, which is now part of Seaspan Marine Corporation.
- 1997 – City of North Vancouver study recommends mixed-use development on the site.
- 2000 – Real estate developer Pinnacle International creates a plan for the site involving multiple condo towers, hotel, commercial space and public amenities. Three of the former shipyard buildings, two shipyard cranes and the stern and steam engines from the former HMS Flamborough Head (HMCS Cape Breton), which was built here in 1944, are to be preserved as part of the development.
- 2006 – The City of North Vancouver announces a plan for a new National Maritime Museum of the Pacific with federal and provincial funding to be located on the property. The city also negotiates with Pinnacle International for increased density and building heights in return for approving development of the site and to make room for the museum.
- 2010 – The National Maritime Museum project is shelved after the provincial government failed to commit funding. The continued vision for site, to be housed inside the former Machine Shop building, is for a resident and tourist destination including a regional attraction and supporting retail uses. The Machine Shop building is temporarily dismantled and removed during site construction, while the former Pipe Shop and Coppersmiths Shop have been restored for retail use. The shipyard cranes have been restored and now tower over the development, one above Shipyard Plaza and one above Craneway Plaza. Signs and dioramas around the site tell the history of the former shipyard.

== Ships built ==
(for a complete list, see)

Gentleman's Yachts

- MY Fifer 30m motor yacht 1939

Warships

- St. Laurent-class destroyer
  - HMCS Skeena (DDH 207)
  - HMCS Fraser (DDH 233)
- Restigouche-class destroyer
  - HMCS Kootenay (DDE 258)
  - HMCS Columbia (DDE 260)
- Mackenzie-class destroyer
  - HMCS Yukon (DDE 263)

Navy repair ships

- HMS Flamborough Head

Beachy Head-class repair ships

- HMS Penlee Point, converted post-war to the missile trials ship HMS Girdle Ness.

Coast Guard icebreakers

- CCGS George R. Pearkes
- CCGS Henry Larsen
- CCGS Pierre Radisson
- CCGS Terry Fox

Canadian Government Ships fisheries patrol vessels

- CGS Kestrel

Coast Guard Research vessels

- CCGS Parizeau
- CCGS Vector

Coast Guard patrol vessels

- CCGS Gordon Reid
- CCGS Martha L. Black

RCMP auxiliary schooner

- St. Roch

Ferries

- Hull 309 MV Queen of Tsawwassen – The second vessel built for BC Ferries
- Hull 311 MV Queen of Vancouver
- Hull 320 MV Queen of the Islands
- Hull 219 MV Queen of Coquitlam
- Hull 100 MV Queen of Surrey – The second of that name (the first became Queen of the North).

Cargo liners

- RMS St Helena

== Ships repaired or refitted ==
- HMS Nabob (D77) refit from USN to RN standards
