= Horseshoe Bay, West Vancouver =

Community in British Columbia, Canada

Horseshoe Bay Ch’ax̱áy̓ (Squamish)
- Community
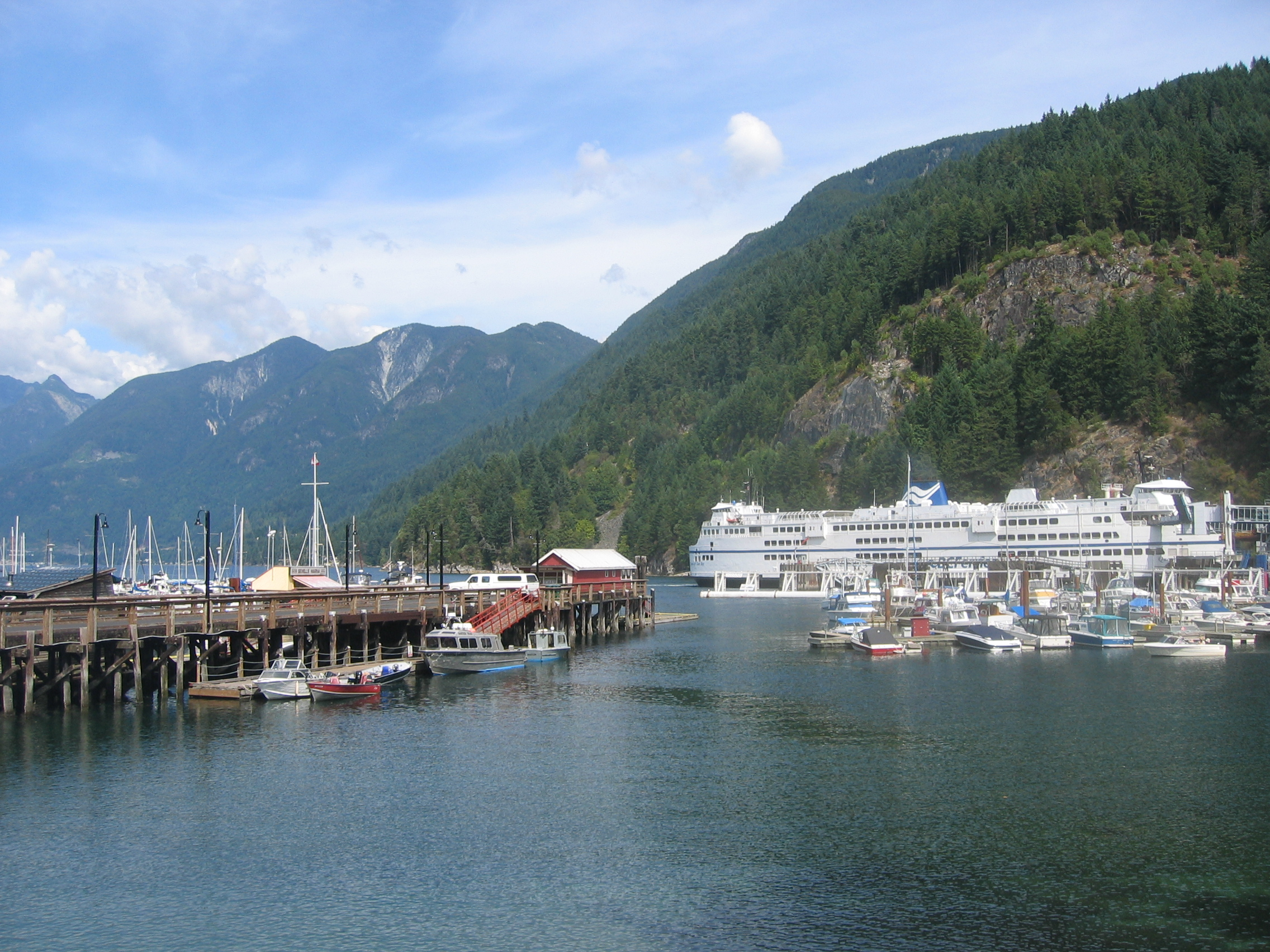
- Horseshoe Bay dock in 2006

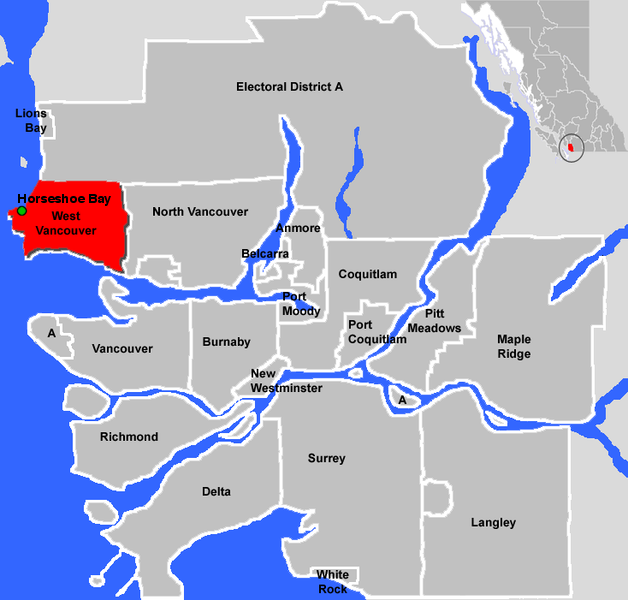
- Location of Horseshoe Bay (green dot) within West Vancouver (red) and Greater Vancouver (dark grey)
- Coordinates: 49°22′26″N 123°16′38″W
- Country: Canada
- Province: British Columbia
- District municipality: West Vancouver
- Time zone: UTC−08:00 (PST)
  - Summer (DST): UTC−07:00 (PDT)
- Forward sortation area: V7W
- Area codes: 604, 778, 236, 672

Horseshoe Bay (Squamish: Ch’ax̱áy̓), formerly known as Whytecliff (1937–1945) and White Cliff City (1909–1937), is a community in West Vancouver, in the Canadian province of British Columbia. It is part of the Greater Vancouver area and marks the entrance to Howe Sound. It is also the western terminus of both Highway 1 on the BC mainland and the main route of the Trans-Canada Highway on the Canadian mainland. The Horseshoe Bay ferry terminal is one of BC Ferries' busiest terminals, serving an estimated 7 million passengers and 3 million vehicles every year.

== History ==
The indigenous Squamish people of the area called the bay Ch’ax̱áy̓, meaning "sizzling waters", because they observed salmon pushing schools of herring to the surface, giving the appearance of bubbling or sizzling water.

Howe Sound was later charted in 1909 by an Admiralty Survey Expedition, which, upon seeing the white weathered cliffs of the peninsula's tip south of Horseshoe Bay, named the area "White Cliff Point". An existing settlement there was also given the name White Cliff City. In the late 1930s, Colonel Albert Whyte, one of the sponsors of the expedition, purchased a large amount of land in the area and persuaded the Pacific Great Eastern Railway (present-day BC Rail) to adopt the name Whytecliff – an intentional misspelling of White Cliff – as the official name of the settlement on December 7, 1937. Whyte was thus able to memorialize himself until July 28, 1945, when the community elected to adopt the present name of Horseshoe Bay, on account of the adjacent bay's horseshoe shape.

== Administration ==
Horseshoe Bay is listed in the BC Geographical Names database as a community, "an unincorporated populated place, generally with a population of 50 or more, [that has] a recognized central area". The provincial government recognized it as a community on April 15, 1982.

== Transportation ==
Canadian Pacific 2860 seen hauling The Royal Hudson excursion train near Horseshoe Bay in August 1974.

Situated on the western tip of West Vancouver at the entrance to Howe Sound, the village marks the western end of Highway 1 on the BC mainland, as well as the western end of the main route of the Trans-Canada Highway on the Canadian mainland. It also serves as the southern end of the Sea-to-Sky Highway, with Lions Bay a short distance north.

Horseshoe Bay is the location of one of the busiest BC Ferries terminals, the Horseshoe Bay ferry terminal. It has an estimated annual traffic of 7 million passengers and 3 million vehicles. Because of the presence of the ferry terminal, it is considered a control city on the Upper Levels Highway westbound.

== See also ==
- Whytecliff Park
