= Barrett Battery =

Barrett Point is located at the foot of Mount Hayes at the entrance to Prince Rupert Harbour at 54°14′28″N 130°20′02″W. It was a coastal fortification during World War II.

== History ==
The city of Prince Rupert was the nearest railhead to the Alaska and was strategically important to the defence of Alaska and West Coast of Canada. Barrett point battery was the key component of the defences of Prince Rupert in World War II. In 1938 Major Treatt of the Canada War Department, inspected the West Coast of Canada and determined suitable locations for Coastal defences. Barrett Point became the focal point of the defences that included gun batteries at Fredrick Point, Casey Point, Fairview Point and Dundas Point. The fort had 3 gun positions which were first equipped with Mk 12 6" anti-aircraft guns on Mk 7 mounts, later replaced by 3x 6" Mk 24 guns two on Mk5 mounts and one on a Mk5 mount. In addition a 6 pounder Hotchkiss quick firing gun was mounted, as well as 2x 40mm Bofors anti-aircraft guns. The guns of this fort and the others were controlled by a director station behind and above the centre gun position. Ammunition was stored in an underground magazine accessed by an electrical hoist for each gun. Behind the main battery protected by the hill was hardened generator room and other support buildings. Two searchlight towers front the fort along the shoreline. Bearings from these lights would be fed to the director for fire control. An observation post was established above the fort on top of Mt Hayes.

The guns were manned by the Northern British Columbia heavy battery, Royal Canadian Artillery, later designated the 102nd Coast Battery of the 17th North British Columbia Coast Regiment. It's unclear as to when the battery ceased operations, as war progressed and the threat of attacked diminished, the soldiers manning the defences were drawn down to serve elsewhere. It would appear the guns were removed some time between Sept 1945 and the end of 1946. The last coastal defences along the West Coast of Canada at Fort Rodd Hill were disbanded in 1958.

== Today ==
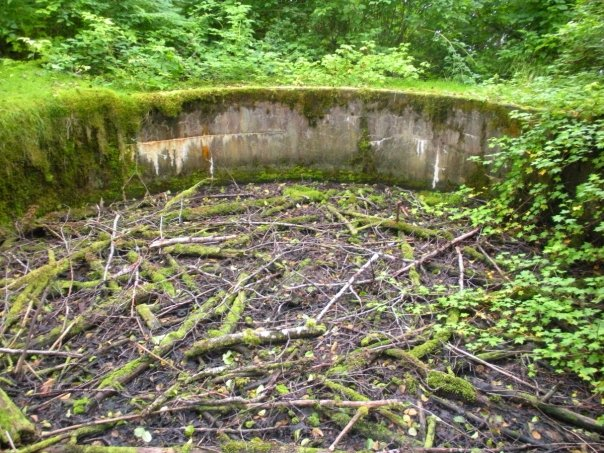
One of the gun positions as it looks today

Gun Ready room

Much of the Battery fortifications are overgrown but can be seen on foot. Caution is advised as there are unmarked openings and entering the bunker should only be done with the proper equipment.

== See also ==
- List of World War II-era fortifications on the British Columbia Coast
