= George Blanchard Dodge =

George Blanchard Dodge (1874-1945) was a civil engineer and a surveyor with the Canadian Department of Crown Lands.

Dodge worked for the British Admiralty conducting surveys in Newfoundland before joining the staff of Surveyor General Édouard-Gaston Deville in Ottawa. He was released from Deville's staff to supervise the first continuing survey of the Pacific Coast of Canada.

Dodge Cove on Digby Island, British Columbia, Canada was named in 1907 by the Canadian Department of Marine and Fisheries, Ottawa, after Dodge who had surveyed Prince Rupert Harbour in 1906 for the Canadian federal government.
