= Yorke Island =

Yorke Island may refer to:

- Yorke Island (Queensland) aka Masig Island
  - Yorke Island Airport
- Yorke Island (Canada), in the Johnstone Strait area of the Coast of British Columbia
