= Albert Head =

Albert Head may refer to:

- Albert Head, British Columbia, a community on Vancouver Island, Canada
- Albert Head, a training facility at CFB Esquimalt
