= YPR =

YPR may refer to:

- YPR, the IATA code for Prince Rupert Airport, British Columbia, Canada
- YPR, the Indian Railways station code for Yesvantpur Junction railway station, Karnataka, India
- YPR-765, a Dutch infantry fighting vehicle
