= Macaulay Point Battery =

Coordinates: 50°26′57″N 125°58′35″W

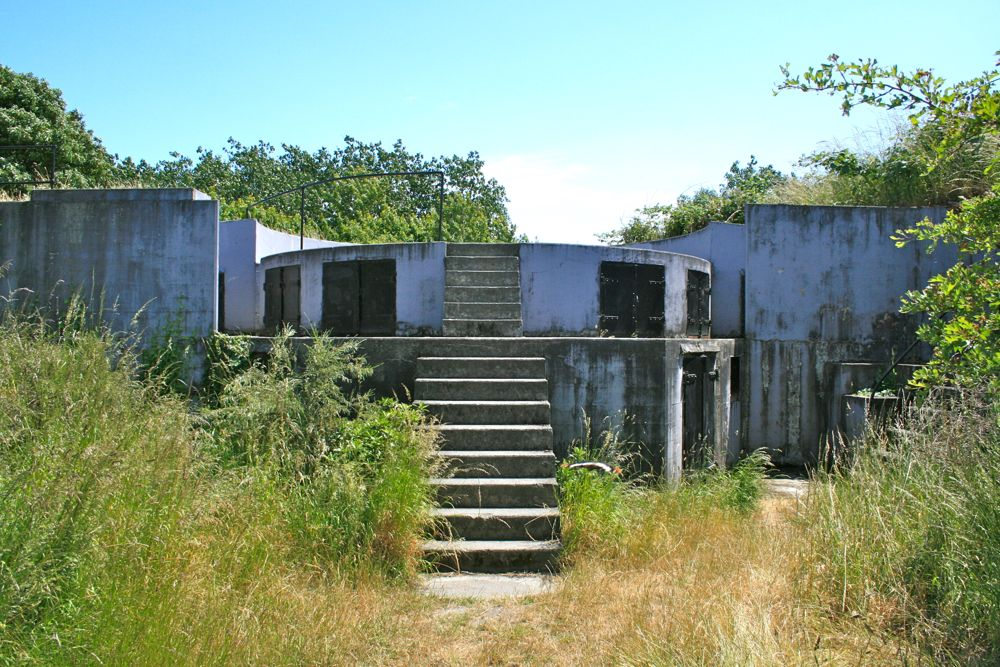
Fort Macaulay Gun Emplacement 2

The Macaulay Point Battery is a historic gun emplacement in Victoria, British Columbia. A fort was built here between February 1894 and October 1897. The site is now a park.

== See also ==
- Fleming Bay
- Barrett Point
- Stanley Park
- List of World War II-era fortifications on the British Columbia Coast
