= Fleming Bay =

Bay in British Columbia, Canada

Coordinates: 48.4200°N 123.4121°W

Fleming Bay is located in Esquimalt, adjacent to the city of Victoria, British Columbia, Canada. Fleming Bay is one of entrances to Macaulay Point and Buxton Green.

Fleming Bay has large rock cliffs that are popular with rock climbers.

Fleming Bay is protected from the seas by a rock man-made Breakwater.

At Fleming beach in Fleming Bay there is a well maintained boat ramp for trailerable boats with docks for queuing up, it is run by the Esquimalt Anglers Association.

== See also ==
- Macaulay Point Battery
