= Prince Rupert, British Columbia =

City in Canada

Prince Rupert
- City
- City of Prince Rupert
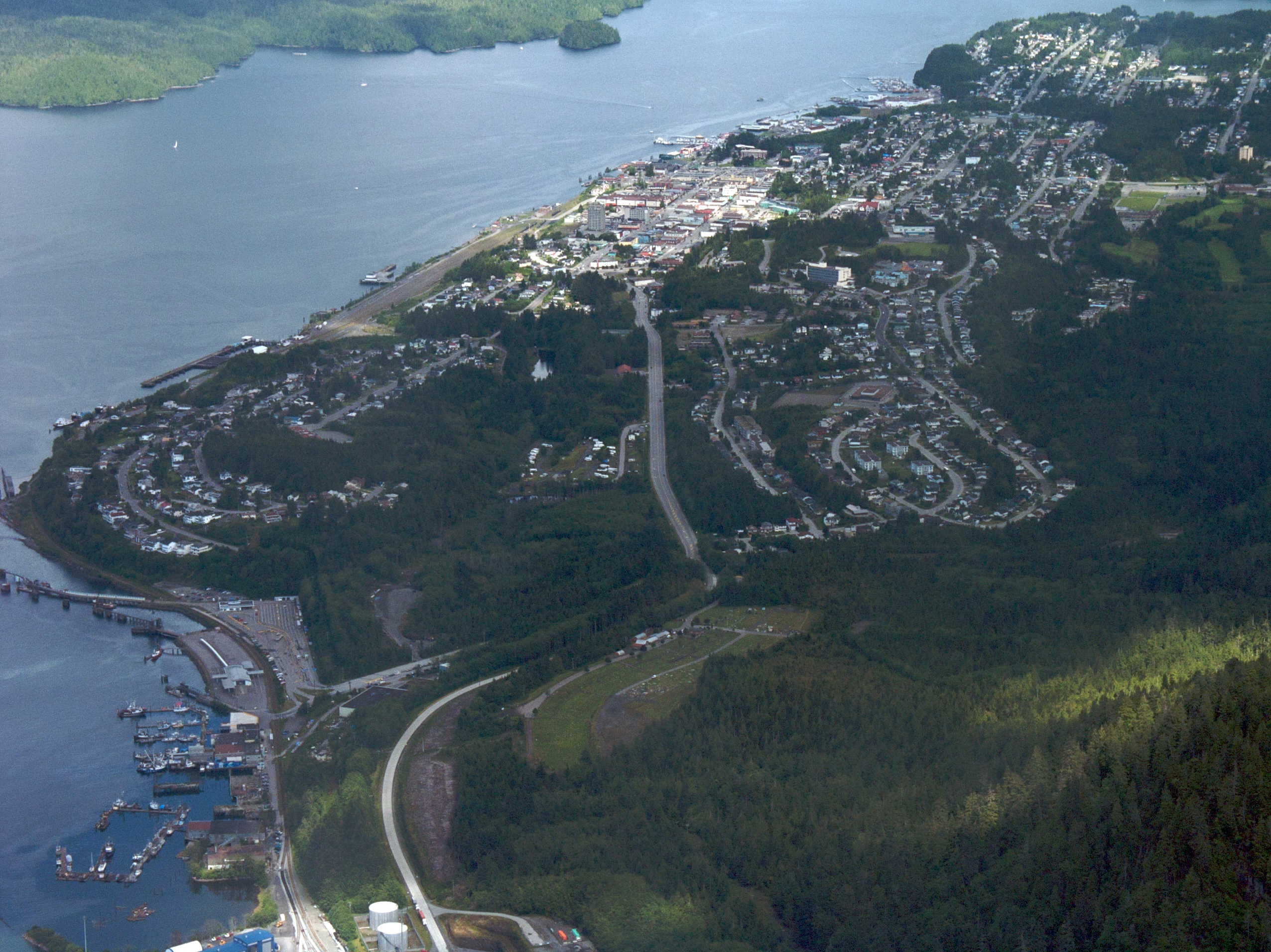
- Aerial view of Prince Rupert

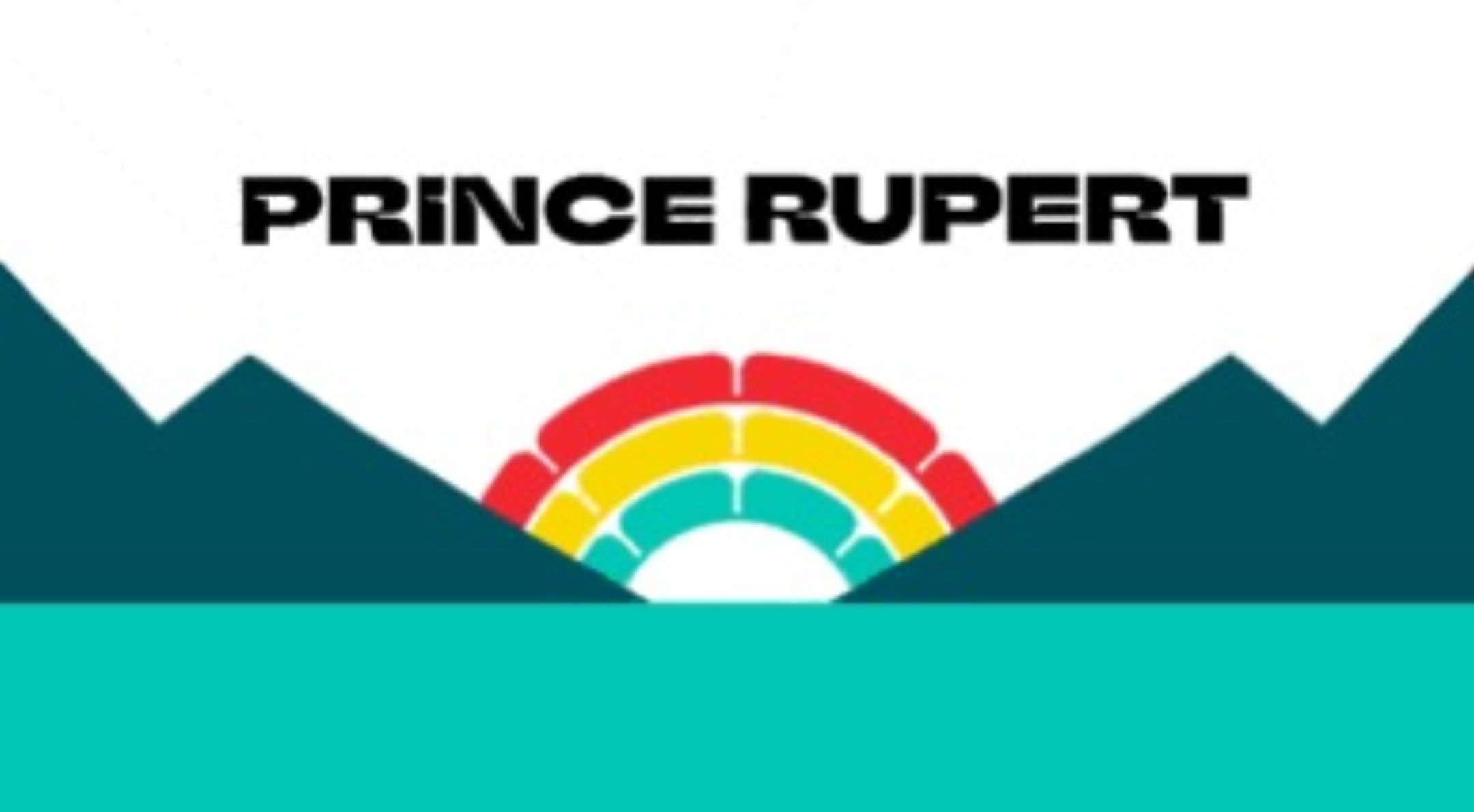
- Flag Coat of arms
- Nicknames: Rainforest City, City of Rainbows
- Location of Prince Rupert in British Columbia Prince Rupert (Canada)
- Coordinates: 54°18′46″N 130°19′31″W
- Country: Canada
- Province: British Columbia
- Regional District: North Coast
- Incorporated: March 10, 1910
- Named for: Prince Rupert of the Rhine

Government
  - Mayor: Herb Pond
  - Governing Body: Prince Rupert City Council
  - MP: Ellis Ross (Conservative)
  - MLA: Tamara Davidson (NDP)

Area
  - City: 54.93 km^{2} (21.21 sq mi)
  - Metro: 222.94 km^{2} (86.08 sq mi)
- Elevation: 40 m (130 ft)

Population (2021)
  - City: 12,300
  - Density: 227.7/km^{2} (590/sq mi)
  - Metro: 13,052
  - Metro density: 58.5/km^{2} (152/sq mi)
- Time zone: UTC–07:00 (PT)
- Forward sortation area: V8J
- Area codes: 250, 778, 236, 672
- Website: princerupert.ca

Prince Rupert is a port city in the province of British Columbia, Canada. It is located on Kaien Island near the Alaskan panhandle. It is the land, air, and water transportation hub of British Columbia's North Coast, and has a population of 12,300 people as of 2021.

== History ==
Coast Tsimshian (Ts'msyen) occupation of the Prince Rupert Harbour area spans at least 5,000 years. About 1500 B.C. there was a significant population increase, associated with larger villages and house construction. The early 1830s saw a loss of Coast Tsimshian (Ts'msyen) influence in the Prince Rupert Harbour area.

=== Founding ===
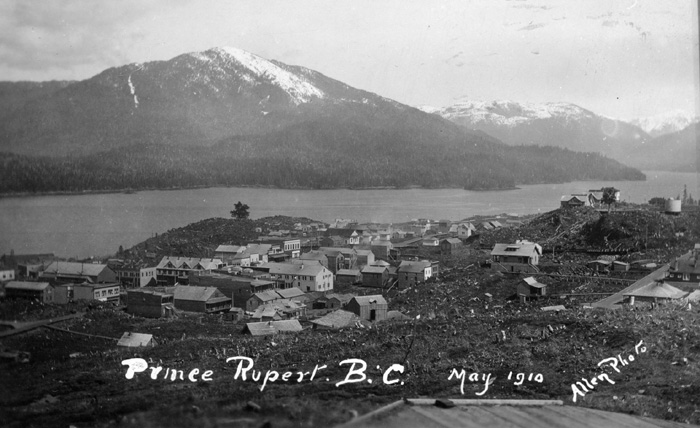
Prince Rupert, May 1910, looking north toward Mount Morse

Prince Rupert replaced Port Simpson as the choice for the Grand Trunk Pacific Railway (GTP) western terminus. It also replaced Port Essington, 29 km (18 mi) away on the southern bank of the Skeena River, as the business centre for the North Coast.

The GTP purchased the 57 km^{2} (14,000-acre) First Nations reserve, and received a 40 km^{2} (10,000-acre) grant from the BC government. A post office was established on November 23, 1906. Surveys and clearing, that commenced in that year, preceded the laying out of the 8.1 km^{2} (2,000-acre) town site. A $200,000 provincial grant financed plank sidewalks, roads, sewers and water mains. Kaien Island, which comprised damp muskeg overlaying solid bedrock, proved expensive both for developing the land for railway and town use.

By 1909, the town possessed four groceries, two hardware stores, two men's clothing shops, a furniture store, and several fruit and cigar stores, a wholesale drygoods outlet, a wholesale/retail butcher, two banks, the GTP Hotel and annex, and numerous lodging houses and restaurants. The first lot sales that year created a bidding war.

Prince Rupert was incorporated on March 10, 1910. Although he never visited Canada, it was named after Prince Rupert of the Rhine, the first governor of the Hudson's Bay Company, as the result of a nationwide competition held by the Grand Trunk Railway, the prize for which was $250.

With the collapse of the real estate boom in 1912, and World War I, much of the company's land remained unsold. The GTP also planned a large hotel, the Château Prince Rupert, connected to a railway station and passenger ship pier, all of which went unbuilt. Charles Melville Hays, president of the GTP, died returning from London on the Titanic, and his grand vision for the port died too. His sudden death, together with a business plan which made little sense, was primarily responsible for the bankruptcy of the company, and the establishment of a town that took decades to achieve even a small fraction of the promises touted. Mount Hays, the larger of two mountains on Kaien Island, is named in his honour, as is a local high school, Charles Hays Secondary School. The Prince Rupert station, a listed historic place, replaced a temporary building in 1922.

=== 20th and 21st centuries ===
Local politicians used the promise of a highway connected to the mainland as an incentive, and the city grew over the next several decades. At the onset of the Second World War, both Canada and the United States realized the importance of building this highway for defence purposes. On September 4, 1944, the highway between Terrace and Prince Rupert was opened, allowing movement of ammunitions to defend the port. Forts were built at Barrett Point and Fredrick Point. After the attack on Pearl Harbor, the Canadian government planned to level off Mount Hays, the largest mountain to the southeast of the city, to allow for a potential airstrip due to its tactical location and advantage. The road was paved in 1951 and extensively rerouted and repaved in 1970.

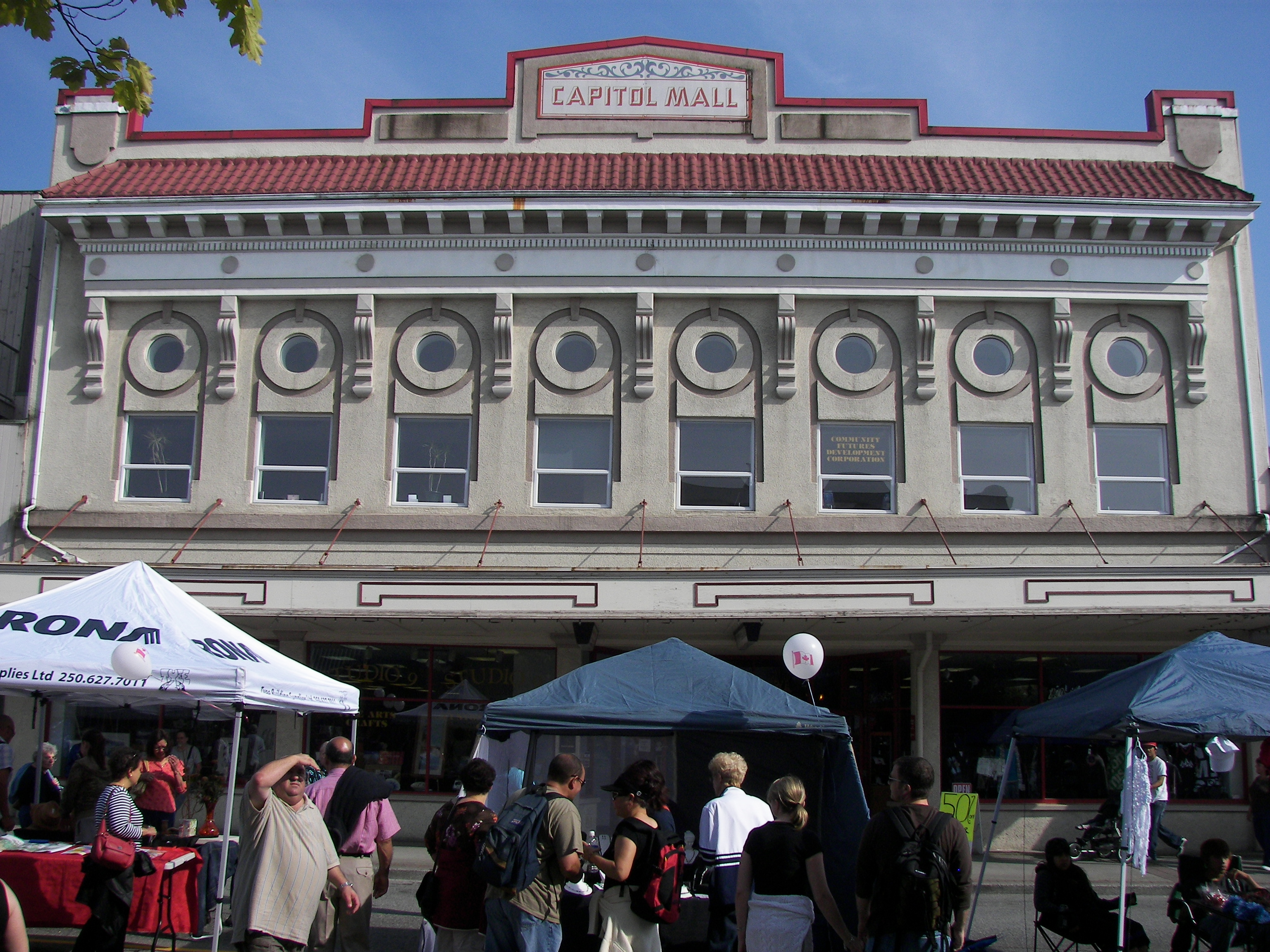
The former Capitol Theatre, built in 1928

After World War II, the fishing industry, particularly for salmon and halibut, and forestry became the city's major industries. Prince Rupert was considered the halibut capital of the world from the opening of the Canadian Fish & Cold Storage plant in 1912 until the early 1980s. A long-standing dispute over fishing rights in the Dixon Entrance to the Hecate Strait between American and Canadian fisherman led to the formation of the 54-40 or Fight Society. The United States Coast Guard maintains a base in nearby Ketchikan, Alaska.

In 1946, the Government of Canada, through an order in council, granted the Department of National Defence the power to administer and maintain facilities to collect data for communications research. The Royal Canadian Navy was allotted forty positions, seven of which were in Prince Rupert. In either 1948 or 1949, Prince Rupert ceased operations, and the positions were relocated to RCAF Station Whitehorse, Yukon. The 1949 Queen Charlotte earthquake, with a surface wave magnitude of 8.1 and a maximum Mercalli intensity of VIII (severe), broke windows and swayed buildings on August 22.

In summer 1958, Prince Rupert endured a riot over racial discrimination. Ongoing discontent with heavy-handed police practices towards Aboriginals escalated to rioting during BC centennial celebrations after two young indigenous women were beaten with flashlights by police. As many as 1,000 people (one-tenth of the city's population at the time) began smashing windows and skirmishing with police. The Riot Act was read for only the second time since Confederation.

Over the years, hundreds of students were said to have largely paid their way through school by working in the lucrative fishing industry. Construction of a pulp mill began in 1947 and it was operating by 1951. In 1958, Indo-Canadian industrialist Sohen Singh Gill established Prince Rupert Sawmills at the location of the old dry dock on Prince Rupert's waterfront. In the 1960s, the majority of the town's workforce was employed either in the fishery or at Gill's sawmill. The construction of coal and grain shipping terminals followed. From the 1960s into the 1980s, the city constructed many improvements, including a civic centre, swimming pool, public library, golf course and performing arts centre (recently renamed "The Lester Centre of the Arts"). These developments marked the town's changes from a fishing and mill town into a small city.

In the 1990s, both the fishing and forestry industries suffered a significant downturn. In July 1997, Canadian fishermen blockaded the Alaska Marine Highway ferry M/V Malaspina, keeping it in the port as a protest in the salmon fishing rights dispute between Alaska and British Columbia. The forest industry declined when a softwood lumber dispute arose between Canada and the USA. After the pulp mill closed, many people were unemployed, and much modern machinery was left unused. After reaching a peak of about 18,000 in the early 1990s, Prince Rupert's population began to decline, as people left in search of work.

The years from 1996 to 2004 were difficult for Prince Rupert, with closure of the pulp mill, the burning down of a fish plant and a significant population decline. 2005 may be viewed as a critical turning point: the announcement of the construction of a container port in April 2005, combined with new ownership of the pulp mill, the opening in 2004 of a new cruise ship dock, the resurgence of coal and grain shipping, and the prospects of increased heavy industry and tourism may foretell a bright future for the area. The port is becoming an important trans-Pacific hub.

== Geography ==
Prince Rupert is on Kaien Island (approximately 770 km (480 mi) northwest of Vancouver), just north of the mouth of Skeena River, and linked by a short bridge to the mainland. The city is along the island's northwestern shore, fronting on Prince Rupert Harbour. It lies at similar latitudes to Cumbria and the city of Newcastle-Upon-Tyne in the northeast of England.

At the secondary western terminus of Trans-Canada Highway 16 (the Yellowhead Highway), Prince Rupert is approximately 16 km west of Port Edward, 144 km west of Terrace, and 715 km west of Prince George.

=== Climate ===
Prince Rupert has an oceanic climate (Köppen Cfb, Trewartha Dolk) and is also located in a temperate rainforest. Prince Rupert is known as "The City of Rainbows", as it is Canada's wettest city. It has annual averages of precipitation ranging from 2,620 mm (103 in) at the airport to 3,060 mm (120 in) in town. In addition, on average 240 days per year receive at least some measurable precipitation, and on average there are only 1242 hours of sunshine per year, so it is regarded as the municipality in Canada that receives the least amount of sunshine annually. Tourist brochures boast about Prince Rupert's "100 days of sunshine". However, Stewart, British Columbia, receives even less sunshine, at 985 sunshine hours per year.

Out of Canada's 100 largest cities, Prince Rupert has the coolest summer, with an average high of 15.67 °C (60.21 °F). Winters in Prince Rupert are mild by Canadian standards, with the average afternoon temperature in December, January and February being 5.2 °C (41.4 °F), which is the tenth warmest in Canada, surpassed only by other British Columbia cities.

Climate is controlled by several factors: prevailing westerly global winds, the influence of the Pacific Ocean, regional pressure systems, and local topography. Summers are mild and comparatively less rainy, with an August daily mean of 13.8 °C (56.8 °F). Spring and autumn are not particularly well-defined; rainfall nevertheless peaks in the autumn months. Winters are chilly and damp, but warmer than most locations at a similar latitude, due to Pacific moderation: The January daily mean is 2.4 °C (36.3 °F), although frosts and blasts of cold Arctic air from the northeast are not uncommon. These cold outbreaks produce the most pronounced breaks in Prince Rupert's very wet weather, replacing it with much clearer and freezing to frigid conditions.

Snow amounts are moderate for Canadian standards, averaging 0.92 m (36 in) and occurring mostly from December to March. The snow normally melts within a few days, although individual snowstorms may bring copious amounts of snow. Wind speeds are relatively strong, with prevailing winds blowing from the southeast.

The highest temperature ever recorded in Prince Rupert was 32.2 °C (90.0 °F) on 6 June 1958. The lowest temperature ever recorded was −24.4 °C (−11.9 °F) on 4 January 1965.

Climate data for Prince Rupert (Prince Rupert Airport) Climate ID: 1066481; coordinates 54°17′33″N 130°26′41″W; elevation: 35.4 m (116 ft); 1981–2010 normals, extremes 1908–present (Note: Climate data was recorded in Prince Rupert from August 1908 to December 1962 and at Prince Rupert Airport from May 1962 to present.)
Month	Jan	Feb	Mar	Apr	May	Jun	Jul	Aug	Sep	Oct	Nov	Dec	Year
Record high humidex	17.2	18.6	17.9	22.8	29.3	27.8	29.1	31.6	28.5	23.4	19.3	16.1	31.6
Record high °C (°F)	17.8 (64.0)	18.9 (66.0)	20.0 (68.0)	25.5 (77.9)	29.4 (84.9)	32.2 (90.0)	30.6 (87.1)	30.0 (86.0)	27.0 (80.6)	21.7 (71.1)	20.0 (68.0)	18.9 (66.0)	32.2 (90.0)
Mean daily maximum °C (°F)	5.6 (42.1)	6.1 (43.0)	7.7 (45.9)	10.2 (50.4)	12.6 (54.7)	14.7 (58.5)	16.2 (61.2)	17.0 (62.6)	14.9 (58.8)	11.1 (52.0)	7.3 (45.1)	5.5 (41.9)	10.8 (51.4)
Daily mean °C (°F)	2.4 (36.3)	2.7 (36.9)	4.2 (39.6)	6.4 (43.5)	9.0 (48.2)	11.6 (52.9)	13.4 (56.1)	13.8 (56.8)	11.5 (52.7)	8.0 (46.4)	4.3 (39.7)	2.7 (36.9)	7.5 (45.5)
Mean daily minimum °C (°F)	−0.8 (30.6)	−0.7 (30.7)	0.6 (33.1)	2.5 (36.5)	5.4 (41.7)	8.4 (47.1)	10.5 (50.9)	10.6 (51.1)	8.0 (46.4)	4.9 (40.8)	1.3 (34.3)	−0.2 (31.6)	4.2 (39.6)
Record low °C (°F)	−24.4 (−11.9)	−18.1 (−0.6)	−17.2 (1.0)	−7.1 (19.2)	−3.7 (25.3)	1.1 (34.0)	0.6 (33.1)	2.8 (37.0)	−2.2 (28.0)	−11.3 (11.7)	−20.6 (−5.1)	−22.8 (−9.0)	−24.4 (−11.9)
Record low wind chill	−34	−25	−23	−11	−5	−1	1	0	−6	−17	−28	−31	−34
Average precipitation mm (inches)	276.3 (10.88)	185.6 (7.31)	199.6 (7.86)	172.4 (6.79)	137.6 (5.42)	108.8 (4.28)	118.7 (4.67)	169.1 (6.66)	266.3 (10.48)	373.6 (14.71)	317.0 (12.48)	294.2 (11.58)	2,619.1 (103.11)
Average rainfall mm (inches)	252.9 (9.96)	167.1 (6.58)	188.4 (7.42)	169.6 (6.68)	137.5 (5.41)	108.7 (4.28)	118.7 (4.67)	169.1 (6.66)	266.3 (10.48)	373.4 (14.70)	306.9 (12.08)	271.7 (10.70)	2,530.4 (99.62)
Average snowfall cm (inches)	25.6 (10.1)	19.3 (7.6)	11.8 (4.6)	2.8 (1.1)	0.1 (0.0)	0.0 (0.0)	0.0 (0.0)	0.0 (0.0)	0.0 (0.0)	0.3 (0.1)	9.7 (3.8)	22.8 (9.0)	92.4 (36.4)
Average precipitation days (≥ 0.2 mm)	22.5	18.5	21.7	19.6	18.3	17.3	17.5	17.5	19.8	24.2	23.8	22.8	243.5
Average rainy days (≥ 0.2 mm)	20.4	16.4	20.3	19.4	18.3	17.3	17.5	17.5	19.8	24.2	23.4	21.5	235.9
Average snowy days (≥ 0.2 cm)	5.0	4.2	3.6	1.2	0.08	0.0	0.0	0.0	0.04	0.20	2.9	4.6	21.7
Average relative humidity (%) (at 1500 LST)	78.5	71.5	68.1	67.7	71.2	75.0	77.6	77.7	76.1	77.5	77.6	80.2	74.9
Mean monthly sunshine hours	40.1	65.2	103.0	145.8	171.1	154.5	149.7	149.7	115.7	72.4	43.0	32.1	1,242.1
Percentage possible sunshine	16.2	23.8	28.1	34.6	34.5	30.1	29.1	32.4	30.2	22.1	16.7	13.9	26.0
Source: Environment and Climate Change Canada (January maximum) (March maximum) (May maximum) (June maximum) (July minimum) (August maximum) (November maximum)

== Demographics ==
In the 2021 Census of Population conducted by Statistics Canada, Prince Rupert had a population of 12,300 living in 5,072 of its 5,747 total private dwellings, a change of 0.7% from its 2016 population of 12,220. With a land area of 66 km^{2} (25 sq mi), it had a population density of 186.4/km^{2} (482.7/sq mi) in 2021.

Prince Rupert City (1911–1971)
Year	Pop.	±%
1911	4,184	—
1921	6,393	+52.8%
1931	6,350	−0.7%
1941	6,714	+5.7%
1951	8,546	+27.3%
1956	10,498	+22.8%
1961	11,987	+14.2%
1966	14,389	+20.0%
1971	15,747	+9.4%
1976	14,754	−6.3%

Prince Rupert City (1981–2021)
Year	Pop.	±%
1981	16,197	—
1986	15,755	−2.7%
1991	16,620	+5.5%
1996	16,714	+0.6%
2001	14,643	−12.4%
2006	12,815	−12.5%
2011	12,508	−2.4%
2016	12,220	−2.3%
2021	12,300	+0.7%

Prince Rupert Census agglomeration
Year	Pop.	±%
1991	17,359	—
1996	17,414	+0.3%
2001	15,302	−12.1%
2006	13,392	−12.5%
2011	13,052	−2.5%
2016	13,462	+3.1%
2021	13,442	−0.1%

Population by age group (2001 Canadian census and BC Stats Population Estimates, 2004):

- Under 18 years = 4,320 (28.2%)
- 18 – 34 years = 3,370 (22.0%)
- 35 – 54 years = 5,020 (32.8%)
- 55 – 74 years = 2,075 (13.6%)
- 75 years and over = 515 (3.4%)
- Total = 15,300 (100.0%)
- Median age = 34.8

=== Ethnicity ===
As of the 2001 Canadian census, among Canadian municipalities with a population of 5,000 or more, Prince Rupert had the highest percentage of First Nations population.

Panethnic groups in the City of Prince Rupert (1986−2021)
Panethnic group	2021		2016		2011		2006		2001		1996		1991		1986	
Panethnic group	Pop.	%	Pop.	%	Pop.	%	Pop.	%	Pop.	%	Pop.	%	Pop.	%	Pop.	%
European (Note: Statistic includes all persons that did not make up part of a visible minority or an aboriginal identity.)	5,780	47.44%	5,850	48.73%	6,190	50.08%	6,915	54.24%	8,580	59.05%	10,250	61.64%	10,950	66.12%	11,695	75.52%
Indigenous	4,545	37.3%	4,670	38.9%	4,745	38.39%	4,475	35.1%	4,330	29.8%	4,415	26.55%	3,990	24.09%	2,835	18.31%
Southeast Asian (Note: Statistic includes total responses of "Filipino" and "Southeast Asian" under visible minority section on census.)	810	6.65%	640	5.33%	570	4.61%	390	3.06%	605	4.16%	730	4.39%	420	2.54%	125	0.81%
South Asian	660	5.42%	405	3.37%	410	3.32%	535	4.2%	545	3.75%	610	3.67%	425	2.57%	480	3.1%
East Asian (Note: Statistic includes total responses of "Chinese", "Korean", and "Japanese" under visible minority section on census.)	165	1.35%	285	2.37%	315	2.55%	355	2.78%	340	2.34%	455	2.74%	655	3.96%	315	2.03%
African	45	0.37%	65	0.54%	90	0.73%	50	0.39%	35	0.24%	35	0.21%	25	0.15%	5	0.03%
Middle Eastern (Note: Statistic includes total responses of "West Asian" and "Arab" under visible minority section on census.)	40	0.33%	15	0.12%	0	0%	0	0%	0	0%	15	0.09%	25	0.15%	—N/a	—N/a
Latin American	30	0.25%	25	0.21%	0	0%	10	0.08%	45	0.31%	50	0.3%	70	0.42%	30	0.19%
Other/multiracial (Note: Statistic includes total responses of "Visible minority, n.i.e." and "Multiple visible minorities" under visible minority section on census.)	85	0.7%	50	0.42%	20	0.16%	25	0.43%	55	0.38%	75	0.45%	—N/a	—N/a	—N/a	—N/a
Total responses	12,185	99.07%	12,005	98.24%	12,360	98.82%	12,750	99.49%	14,530	99.23%	16,630	99.5%	16,560	99.64%	15,485	98.29%
Total population	12,300	100%	12,220	100%	12,508	100%	12,815	100%	14,643	100%	16,714	100%	16,620	100%	15,755	100%
Note: Totals greater than 100% due to multiple origin responses.

=== Religion ===
According to the 2021 census, religious groups in Prince Rupert included:

- Irreligion (6,825 persons or 56.0%)
- Christianity (4,335 persons or 35.6%)
- Sikhism (415 persons or 3.4%)
- Buddhism (190 persons or 1.6%)
- Hinduism (165 persons or 1.4%)
- Islam (95 persons or 0.8%)
- Indigenous Spirituality (30 persons or 0.2%)
- Judaism (15 persons or 0.1%)

== Government ==
Prince Rupert federal election results
Year	Liberal		Conservative		New Democratic		Green	
2021	8%	349	28%	1,167	52%	2,166	4%	164
2019	14%	697	22%	1,148	52%	2,681	8%	406

Prince Rupert provincial election results
Year	New Democratic		United (Formerly Liberal)		Green		Conservative	
2024	Unknown	Unknown	0%	0	0%	0	Unknown	Unknown
2020	65%	1,949	30%	909	0%	0		
2017	46%	2,228	47%	2,273	7%	356		

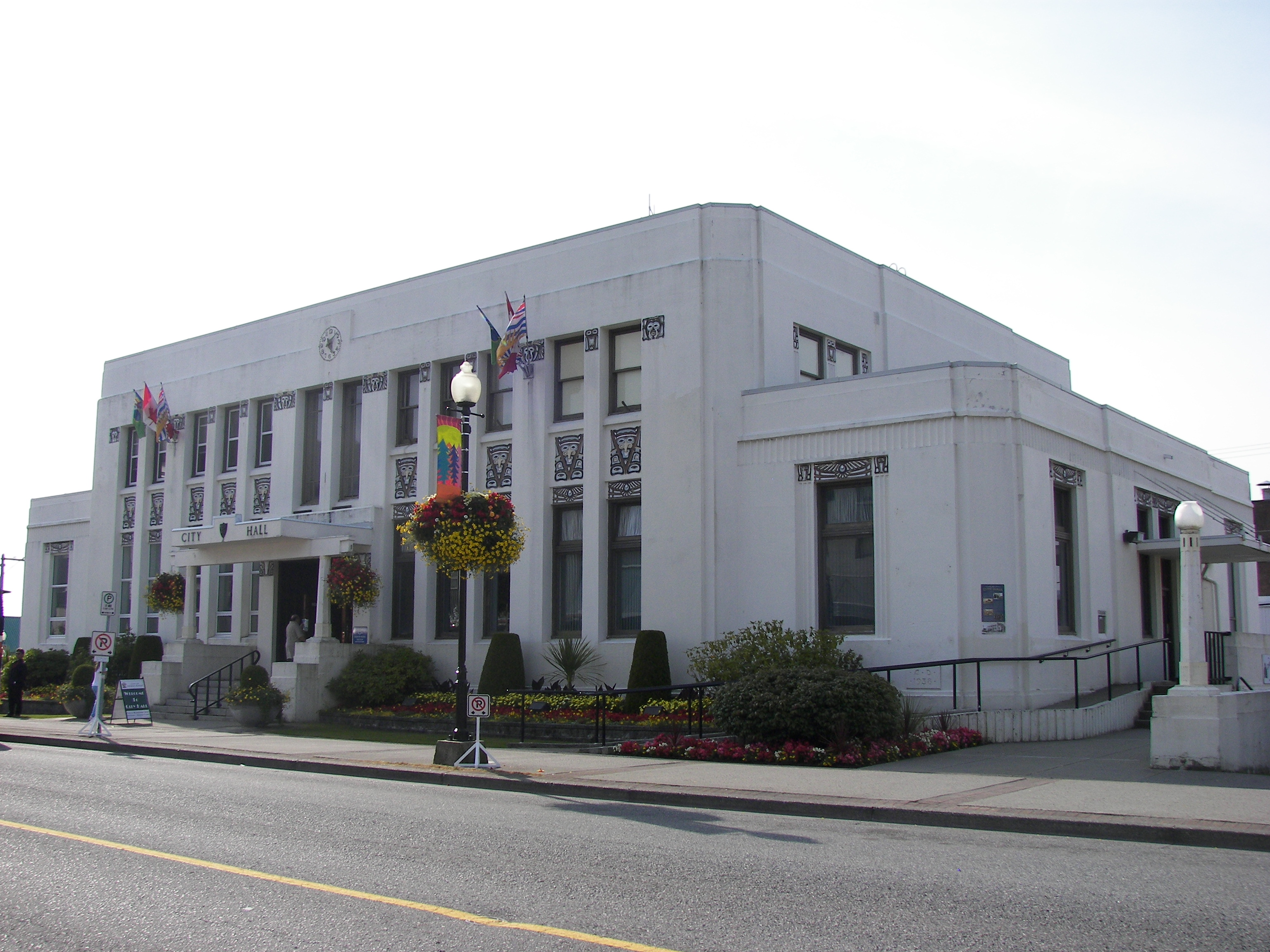
City Hall

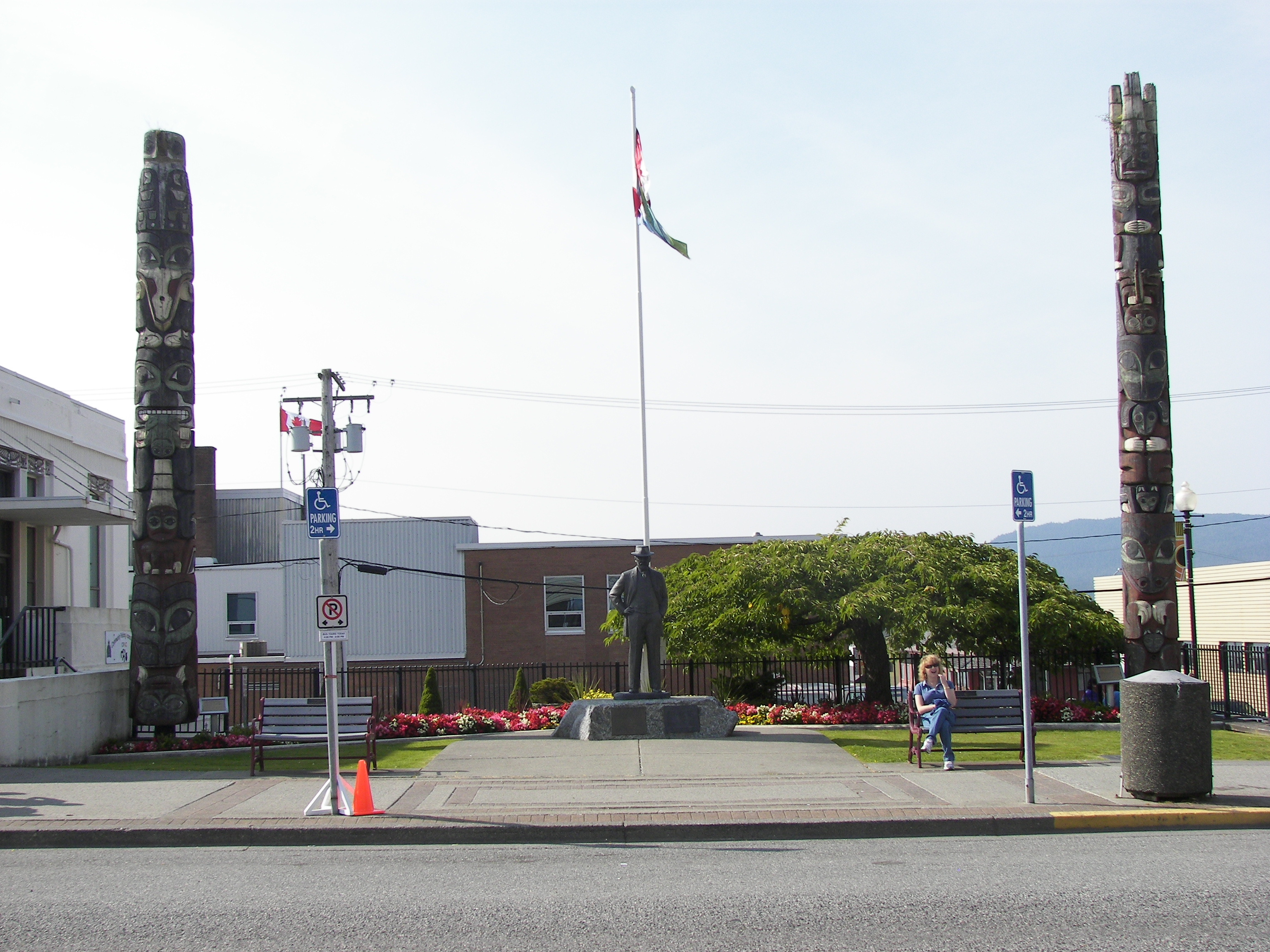
Two of the many totem poles in Prince Rupert are outside City Hall

Prince Rupert is part of the Skeena—Bulkley Valley federal riding. Ellis Ross is the member of Parliament (MP) for the riding, and is a member of the Conservative Party.

Prince Rupert is the largest population centre in the North Coast-Haida Gwaii provincial riding. Tamara Davidson is the member of the Legislative Assembly (MLA). She is a member of the New Democratic Party of British Columbia.

== Education ==
Prince Rupert is in BC School District 52 along with Port Edward. A Coast Mountain College campus is located at 353 5th St. that also serves as a campus for the University of Northern British Columbia.

== Notable residents ==
- Rod Brind'Amour, former captain of the NHL's Carolina Hurricanes
- Iona Campagnolo, politician: Prince Rupert City Council, Liberal Party candidate elected in the federal riding of Skeena; in 1976 she was appointed Minister of Amateur Sports. President of the Liberal Party of Canada in 1982, and served as British Columbia's Lieutenant-Governor from 2001 to 2007.
- Sid Dickens, an artist, now based in Vancouver, British Columbia
- Bernice Liu, is an actress and singer
- Gloria Macarenko, Canadian journalist, co-anchor CBC Vancouver, born and raised in Prince Rupert
- John S. MacDonald, university professor, founding principal of MacDonald, Dettwiler and Associates Ltd
- Alexander Malcolm Manson, the first lawyer in Prince Rupert, was elected in 1916 to the BC Legislature in the riding of Omineca, Speaker of the House in 1921, appointed as both Attorney-General and Minister of Labour in 1922; later appointed to the BC Supreme Court.
- Dan Miller, politician: elected to the Prince Rupert Electoral District, and from August 1999 through February 2000 was Premier.
- Thomas Dufferin "Duff" Pattullo, politician: mayor of Prince Rupert, and Premier of British Columbia (1933 to 1941); member of the Liberal Party.
- Frederick Peters, former Premier of Prince Edward Island and legal partner of Sir Charles Hibbert Tupper, served as City Solicitor from 1911 to 1919.
- Dewey Soriano and Max Soriano, co-owners of the Seattle Pilots major league baseball team, were both born in Prince Rupert.
- Takao Tanabe, CM, OBC is a painter
- Lisa Walters, LPGA golf champion
- Paul Wong, Canadian video artist, now based in Vancouver, British Columbia
- Don Yeomans, Haida artist

== Industry ==
Key sectors of Prince Rupert's economy include commercial fishing, port operations, and tourism.

In November 2022, Global Ports Holding signed a ten year terminal operating agreement with the Prince Rupert Port Authority for the management of infrastructure to handle cruise ships up to 335 metres (1,099 ft) and associated passenger volumes.

Historically fish canning was significant, but the industry has transitioned to fresh and frozen processing.

== Transport ==
=== Roads ===
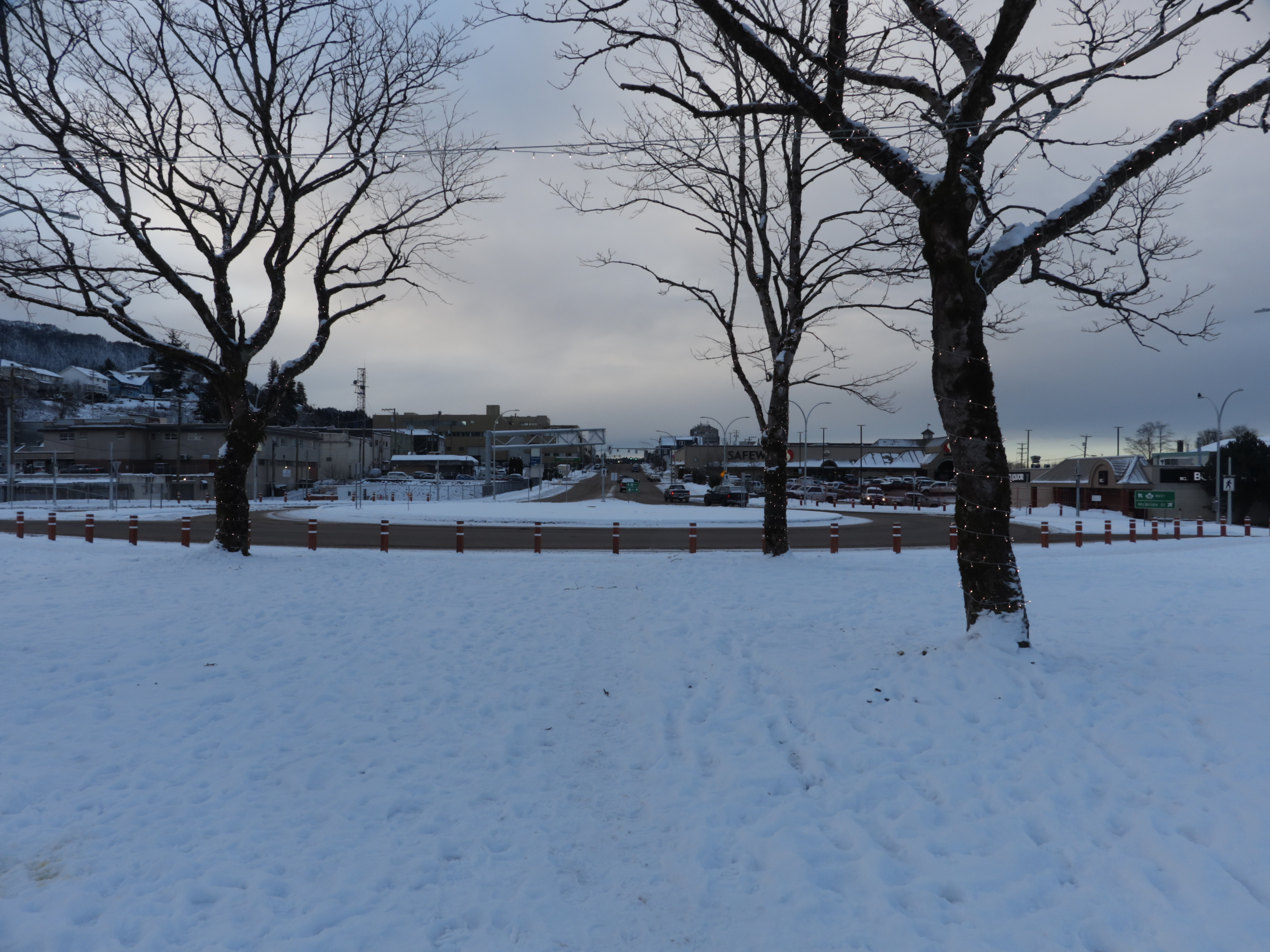
McBride roundabout

The city currently maintains over 60 km of roads, as well as three bridges and a roundabout. Major structures include:

- Hays Creek (Sixth Avenue) Bridge
- Morse Creek (Second Avenue) Bridge
- Cow Bay Trestle Bridge

=== Seaport ===
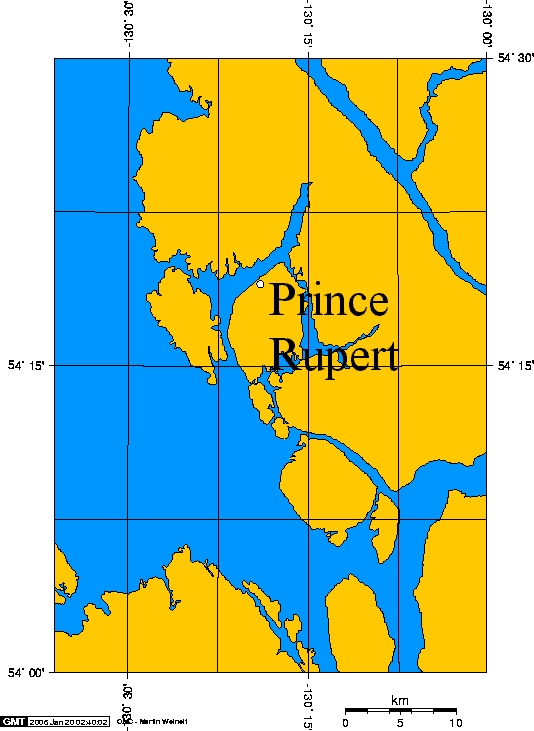
Prince Rupert Harbour

A belief at the beginning of the 1900s that trade expansion was shifting from Atlantic to Pacific destinations, and the benefit of being closer to Asia than existing west coast ports, proved wishful. Reduced transit times to eastern North America and Europe did not outweigh the fact that rail transport has always been far more expensive than by sea. The opening of the Panama Canal in 1914 exacerbated the problem.

During 1906–08, the federal government undertook a hydrographic survey of the Prince Rupert harbour and approaches, finding it free of rocks or obstructions, and sufficient depth for good anchorage. Furthermore, it offered an easy entrance, fine shelter, and ample space. By 1909, a 1,500-foot wharf had been constructed.

The port possesses the deepest ice-free natural harbour in North America, and the 3rd deepest natural harbour in the world. Situated at 54° North, the harbour is the northwesternmost port in North America linked to the continent's railway network. The port is the first inbound and last outbound port of call for some cargo ships travelling between eastern Asia and western North America since it is the closest North American port to key Asian destinations. Prior to its final run in 2021, the CN Aquatrain barge carried rail cargo between Prince Rupert and Whittier, Alaska.

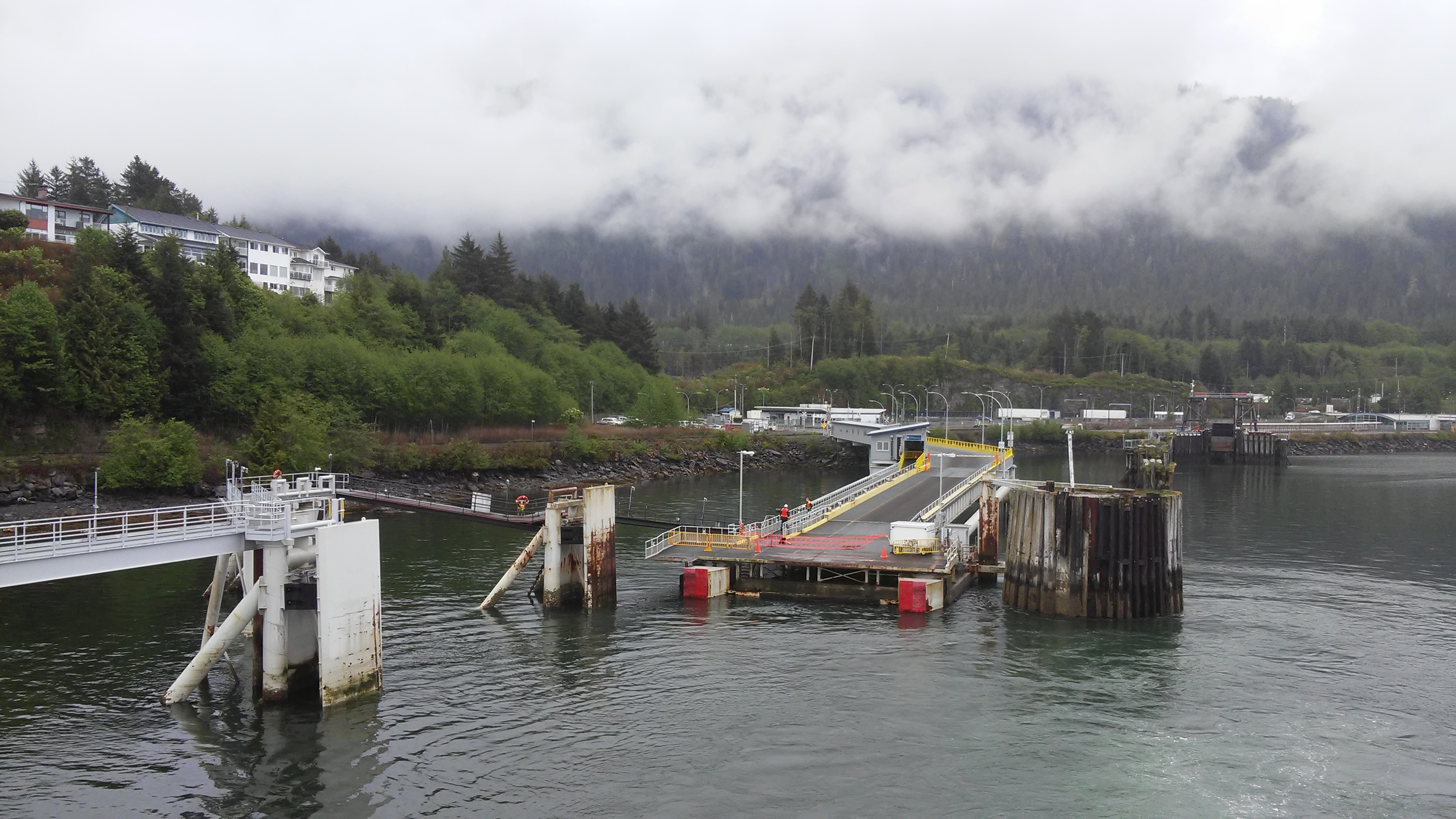
Prince Rupert BC Ferries terminal

Passenger ferries operating from Prince Rupert include BC Ferries' service to the Haida Gwaii and to Port Hardy on Vancouver Island, and Alaska Marine Highway ferries to Ketchikan, Juneau and Sitka and many other ports along Alaska's Inside Passage. The Prince Rupert Ferry Terminal is co-located with the Prince Rupert railway station, from which Via Rail offers a thrice-weekly Jasper – Prince Rupert train, connecting to Prince George and Jasper, and through a connection with The Canadian, to the rest of the continental passenger rail network.

The Prince Rupert Port Authority is responsible for the port's operation.

Much of the harbour is formed by the shelter provided by Digby Island, which lies windward of the city and contains the Prince Rupert Airport. The city is on Kaien Island and the harbour also includes Tuck Inlet, Morse Basin, Wainwright Basin, and Porpoise Harbour, as well as part of the waters of Chatham Sound which takes in Ridley Island.

==== Port facilities ====
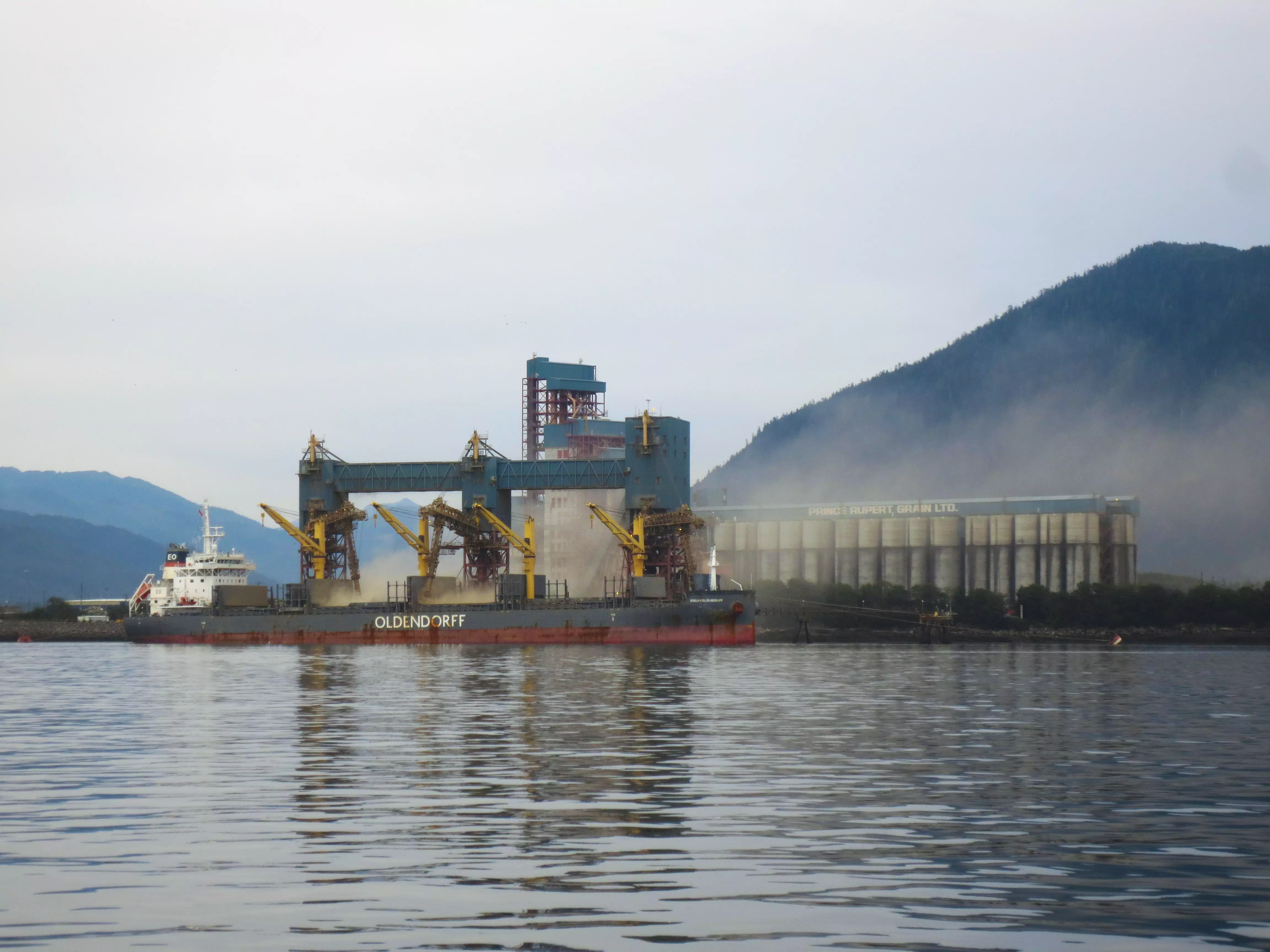
Prince Rupert grain terminal

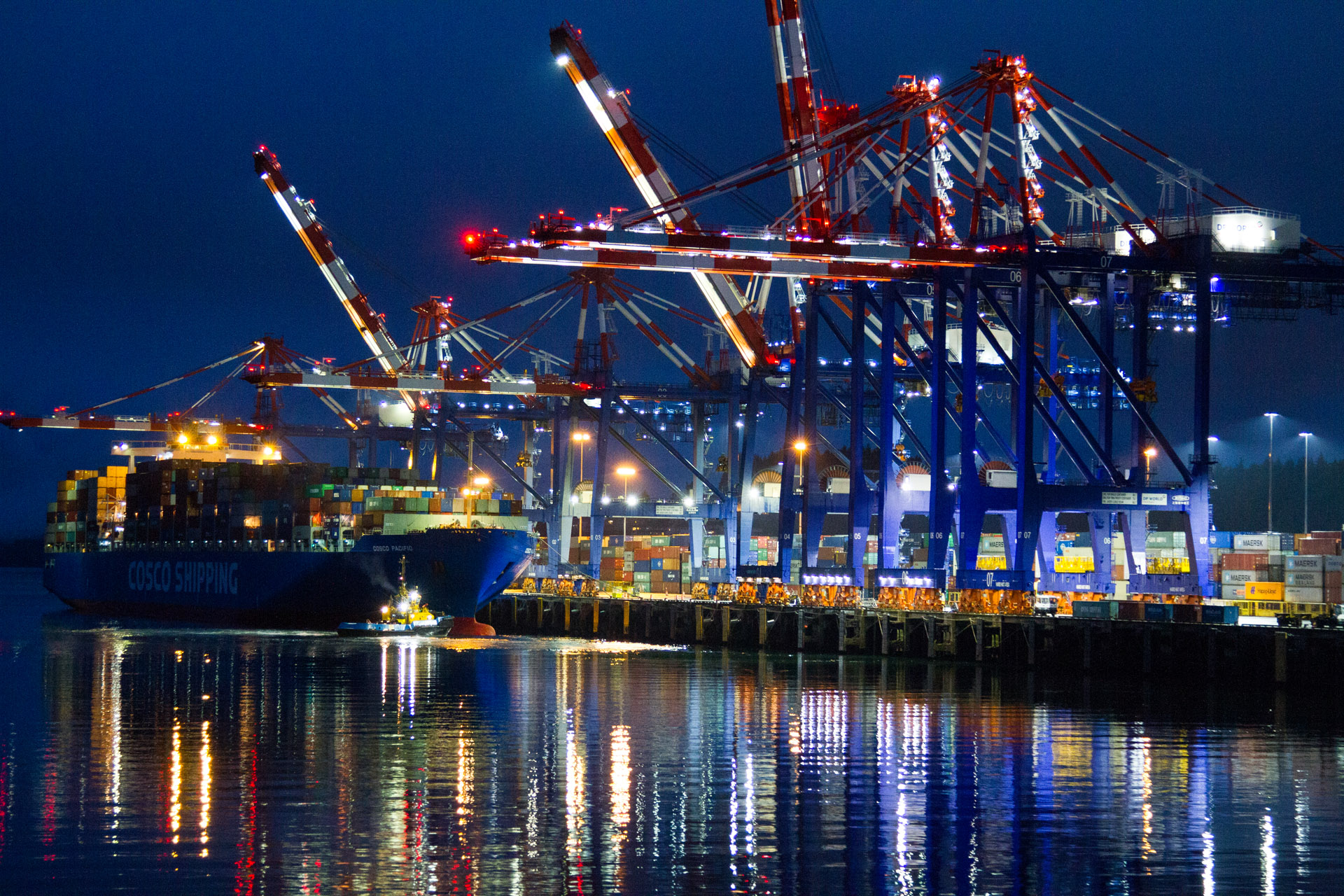
Fairview terminal

Prince Rupert is ideally located for a port, having the deepest natural harbour depths on the continent. The city's port capacity is comparable with the Port of Vancouver's. Unlike most west coast ports, there is little traffic congestion at Prince Rupert. Finally, the extremely mountainous nature and narrow channels of the surrounding area leaves Prince Rupert as the only suitable port location in the inland passage region.

The Prince Rupert Port Authority (PRPA) is a federally appointed agency which administers and operates various port properties on the harbour. Previously run by the National Harbours Board and subsequently the Prince Rupert Port Corporation, the PRPA is now a locally run organization.

PRPA port facilities include:

- Atlin Terminal
- Northlands Terminal
- Lightening Dock
- Ocean Dock
- Westview Dock
- Fairview Terminal
- Prince Rupert Grain
- Trigon Pacific Terminals (formerly Ridley Terminals)
- Sulphur Corporation

All PRPA facilities are serviced by CN Rail.

The Canadian Coast Guard maintains CCG Base Seal Cove on Prince Rupert Harbour where vessels are homeported for search and rescue and maintenance of aids to navigation throughout the north coast. CCG also bases helicopters at Prince Rupert for servicing remote locations with aids to navigation, as well as operating a Marine Communications Centre, covering a large Vessel Traffic Services zone from Port Hardy at the northern tip of Vancouver Island to the Canada–United States border north of Prince Rupert.

Both BC Ferries and the Alaska Marine Highway operate ferries which call at Prince Rupert, with destinations in the Alaska Panhandle, the Haida Gwaii, and isolated communities along the central coast to the south.

=== Airport ===
Prince Rupert Airport (YPR/CYPR) is on Digby Island. Its position is 54°17′10″N 130°26′41″W, and its elevation is 35 m (115 ft)) above sea level. The airport consists of one runway, one passenger terminal, and two aircraft stands. Access to the airport is typically achieved by a bus connection that departs from downtown Prince Rupert (Highliner Hotel) and travels to Digby Island by ferry. The airport is served by Air Canada from Vancouver International Airport (YVR).

Prince Rupert is also served by the Prince Rupert/Seal Cove Water Aerodrome, a seaplane facility with regularly scheduled, as well as chartered, flights to nearby villages and remote locations.

=== Railway ===
CN Rail has a mainline that runs to Prince Rupert from Valemount, British Columbia. At Valemount, the Prince Rupert mainline joins the CN mainline from Vancouver. Freight traffic on the Prince Rupert mainline consists primarily of grain, coal, wood products, chemicals, and as of 2007, containers. As the renovations at the Port of Prince Rupert continue, traffic on CN will steadily rise in future years. Freight capacity was upgraded in 2024.

In addition, a three times weekly Jasper – Prince Rupert train operated by Via Rail connects Prince Rupert with Prince George and Jasper. Running during daylight hours to allow passengers to be able to see the scenery along the entire route; the service takes two days and requires an overnight hotel stay in Prince George. The route ends in Jasper and connects passengers with Via's The Canadian, which runs between Toronto and Vancouver.

== Communications ==
Telephone, mobile, and Internet service are provided by CityWest (formerly CityTel). CityWest is owned by the City of Prince Rupert. CityWest provides long-distance telephone service, as does Telus.

In September 2005, the city changed CityTel from a city department into an independent corporation named CityWest. The new corporation immediately purchased the local cable company, Monarch Cablesystems, expanding CityWest's customer base to other northwest British Columbia communities.

Since January 2008, Rogers Communications has offered GSM and EDGE service in the area—the first real competition to CityWest's virtual monopoly. Rogers offers local numbers based in Port Edward (prefix 600), which is in the local calling zone for the Prince Rupert area. The introduction of Rogers service forced Citywest to form a partnership with Bell Canada to bring digital services to Citywest Mobility, using CDMA.

In December 2013, CityWest and TELUS announced it was transitioning out of the cellular business over 2014 and would partner with TELUS to bring CityWest wireless customers onto TELUS' 4G wireless network.

== Media ==
=== Radio ===
- AM 860 – CFPR, CBC Radio One
- FM 98.1 – VF2119, classic rock (repeats CFNR-FM, Terrace)
- FM 99.1 – CHTK-FM, EZ Rock 99.1
- FM 100.7 – CIAJ-FM, Christian programming
- FM 101.9 – CJFW-FM-2, country music (repeats CJFW-FM, Terrace)

=== Television ===
- Channel 6 – CFTK-TV-1, CTV 2 (repeats CFTK-TV, Terrace)

=== Newspapers ===
- Prince Rupert Daily News, daily newspaper, (1911–2010)
- The Northern View, local weekly newspaper, 2006–present, owned by Black Press
- The Northern Connector, regional weekly newspaper covering Prince Rupert, Kitimat and Terrace areas, 2006–present, owned by Black Press

== Tourist attractions ==
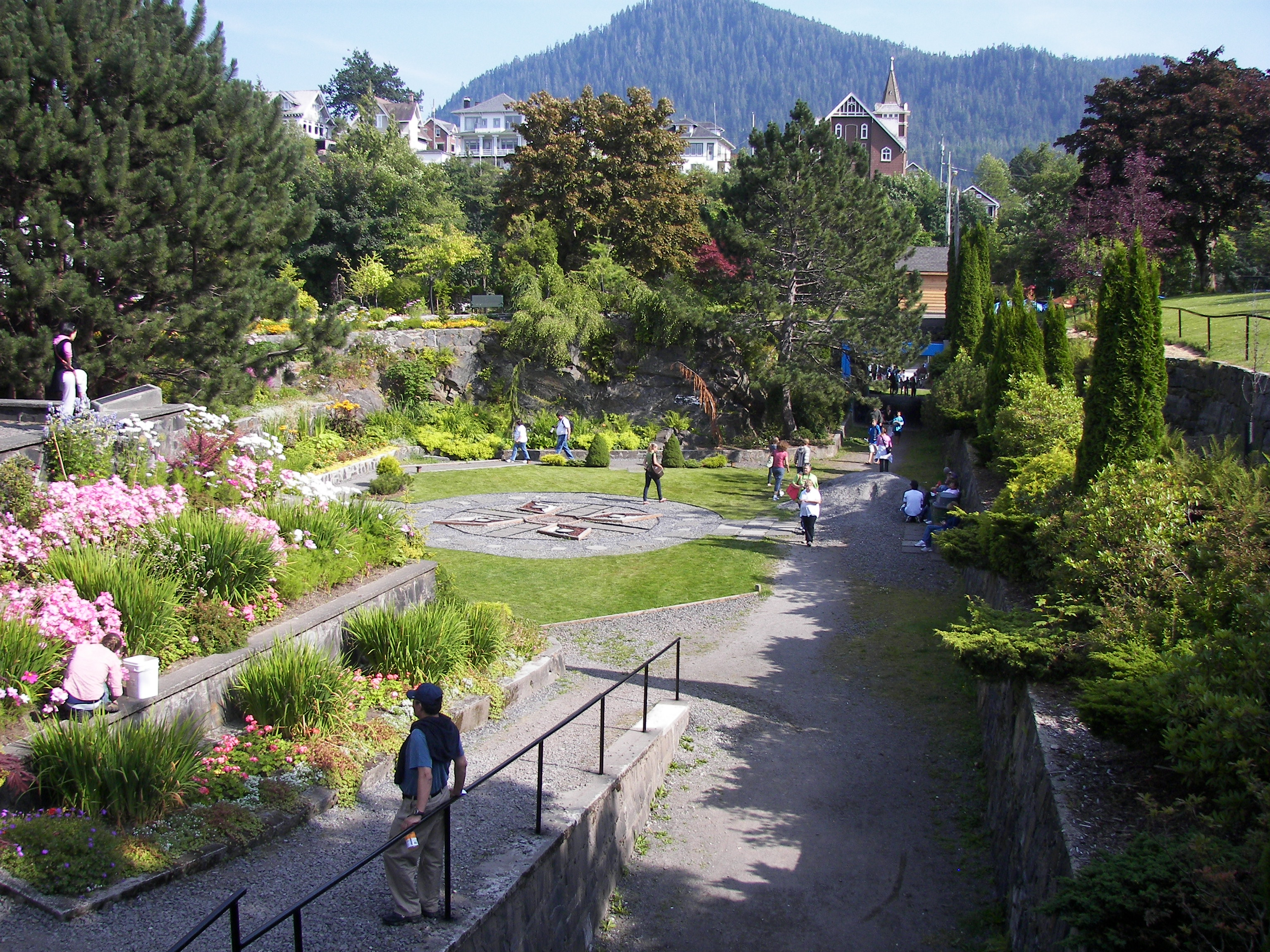
Sunken Gardens near the courthouse

Prince Rupert is a central point on the Inside Passage, a route of relatively sheltered waters running along the Pacific coast from Vancouver, British Columbia to Skagway, Alaska. Due to the Passenger Vessel Services Act of 1886, many cruise ships visit during the summer en route between Alaska to the north and Seattle and the Lower 48 to the south.

Prince Rupert is also the starting point for many wildlife viewing trips, including whales, eagles, salmon and grizzly bears. The Khutzeymateen Grizzly Bear sanctuary features one of the densest remaining populations in North America; tours can be arranged by water, air (using float planes) or land departing from Prince Rupert.

== Neighbouring communities ==
By virtue of location, Prince Rupert is the gateway to many destinations:

- Dodge Cove (1 km; 0.62 mi, west)
- Metlakatla (5 km; 3.1 mi, west)
- Port Edward (15 km; 9.3 mi, south)
- Lax Kw'alaams (Port Simpson) (30 km; 19 mi, northwest)
- Oona River (43 km; 27 mi, southwest)
- Kitkatla (65 km; 40 mi, south)
- Kisumkalum (140 km; 87 mi, east)
- Kitselas (142 km; 88 mi, east)
- Terrace (146 km; 91 mi, east)
- Thornhill (148 km; 92 mi, east)
- Hartley Bay (157 km; 98 mi, southeast)

Haida Gwaii is west of Prince Rupert, across the Hecate Strait. Alaska is 49 nautical miles (91 km; 56 mi) north of Prince Rupert.

== In popular culture ==
The book Unmarked: Landscapes Along Highway 16, written by Sarah de Leeuw, includes an essay about Prince Rupert entitled "Highway of Monsters".

Ra McGuire of the band Trooper wrote the song "Santa Maria" on a boat in Prince Rupert's Harbour.

Amuro Ray, the protagonist of the anime series Mobile Suit Gundam, is born and raised in Prince Rupert.

In 2024, former Prince Rupert city councillor Blair Mirau released a book about the history of the city and region titled The City of Rainbows: A Colourful History of Prince Rupert, published by Heritage House.

== See also ==
- Royal eponyms in Canada
- School District 52 Prince Rupert
