= Sid Dickens =

Canadian artist

- Born: Sidney Michael Dickens; 1963 (age 62–63); Prince Rupert, British Columbia, Canada
- Education: Emily Carr Institute of Art and Design, San Miguel de Allende
- Known for: artist who makes hand-crafted plaster tiles
- Website: www.siddickens.com

Sidney Michael Dickens (born 1963) is a Vancouver-based artist. He is best known for his popular and highly collectible tiles called Memory Blocks. Sid Dickens divides his time between Haida Gwaii and his studio in Vancouver. Religious iconography, historic, romantic images and cracked facades are common themes in his Memory Blocks.

== Life and career ==
Dickens was born into a fishing family in the small northern community of Prince Rupert, British Columbia. After graduating high school in 1981, he worked as a fisherman on and off until he was 28 years old; in the off-season, he served burgers on the ferries and dedicated his spare time to drawing and painting.

In 1983, Dickens enrolled in the prestigious Emily Carr University of Art and Design in Vancouver. He left Emily Carr after one year and returned to Prince Rupert. In 1986, he went on a long backpacking trip through Europe that greatly influenced his aesthetic. Upon his return, he settled in Haida Gwaii with his mother, who had taken a job in Sandspit, on Moresby Island. He spent the next few years working as a logger in the isolated forests. He founded a studio there and began to create large assemblage pieces using materials that he found around him including whalebone, mud, metal, leaves and copper wire left over from the logging industry. He was also experimenting with welding, creating jewelry and chain link.

In 1990, Dickens attended an art school in the internationally renowned artists' colony of San Miguel de Allende in the north central mountains of Mexico.

== Memory Blocks ==
Dickens began making Memory Blocks while he was working in Vancouver during the early 1990s in a studio on Hastings Street.

Memory Blocks have evolved to become individually hand crafted plaster tiles, measuring 6" × 8" × 1 1/4" and finished to a porcelain-like quality, cracked to create an aged look and feel. Some memory blocks are embellished with hand-applied silver and gold leafing.

The Memory Blocks are now internationally distributed and Dickens has a strong following of collectors who create websites and forums on his behalf. The marketing strategy is similar to Lladro and Royal Doulton porcelain figureines, where styles and collections are often produced in limited runs, and retired pieces are valued as highly collectible.
