= Fairview Point =

Coordinates: 54°17′20″N 130°21′25″W

Fairview Point is a point or headland on the west side of Kaien Island on the North Coast of British Columbia, Canada.

== History ==
During World War II, Fairview Point played an important role in the defence of the Port of Prince Rupert and its associated CNR railhead.

"A late and important addition to Prince Rupert's coast defences was the joint Canadian-US enterprise at Fairview Point, a mile south of the city limits. The establishment of an American Sub-Port of Embarkation with extensive docking facilities at Price Rupert, and a large staging camp at Port Edward, on the mainland ten miles by road and rail from the city, intensified Washington's concern about the security of the area, particularly having in mind the limited range of the "interim" counter-bombardment 6-inch battery at Fort Barrett. Early in 1942 the United States made available, to supplement the Barrett battery, two more 8-inch railway guns, similar to those already installed at Christopher Point. On arrival at Prince Rupert the guns were run out to Fairview Point on spurs hurriedly built from the main CNR line, and were solidly braced on positions under which vast quantities of rock had been sunk into the muskeg. Much of the work of constructing roads, bridges and railway spurs in preparation for the big guns was done by members o the 9th Heavy Battery RCA, who had been manning mobile 8-inch howitzers at Porter's Lake near Halifax. Arriving at Fairview on 26 March 1942, they took up temporary residence in refitted railway cars near their new home, and by 9 April they reported the guns capable of firing in an emergency. When the Japanese attacked the Aleutians on 3 June, both guns were still in the process of being settled in their new positions. Late next day, however, No 2 gun was ready for action." From: Gunners of Canada Vol 2 pgs 469 & 476 via Tanknet

CDSG Journal May 2000 has an article on "Prince Rupert Defenses 1938-45" by David Morgan with following info on these guns pp18–19 via Tanknet:

The Canadian Army received (so operated by them, if not clear already):

"Fairview Battery: counter bombardment. Two US 8-inch M1888 railway guns with associated ammunition and fire control cars, became operational in early June 1942. One 20mm LAA and 2 40mm LAA guns. The battery was built on a rail spur off the CNR mainline. The guns were left mounted on the railway cars and had 360 deg arcs of fire. Both guns were ready for action in early June 1942. Digby Island to the west masked the battery's view of the open water to Chatham Sound, so Fairview was not fitted with search lights, being designated a "day fort". It had two horizontal base lines of 5,000 yards each and employed a Whistler-Hearn plotting board. The battery was removed from an operational role April 28, 1945. The author has been unable to locate any trace of this battery or any photos associated with it."

== See also ==
- List of World War II-era fortifications on the British Columbia Coast
