= Dodge Cove =

- Unincorporated community
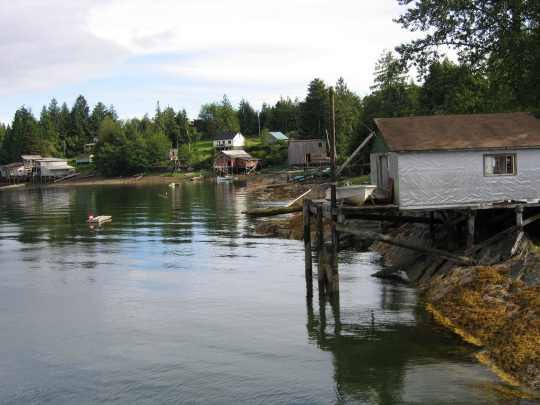
- A view of Dodge Cove

- Location of Dodge Cove in British Columbia
- Coordinates: 54.28777°N 130.3875°W
- Dodge Cove: Established 1907

Population (April 2015)
  - Total: 29 (estimated)
- Time zone: UTC−07:00 (PT)

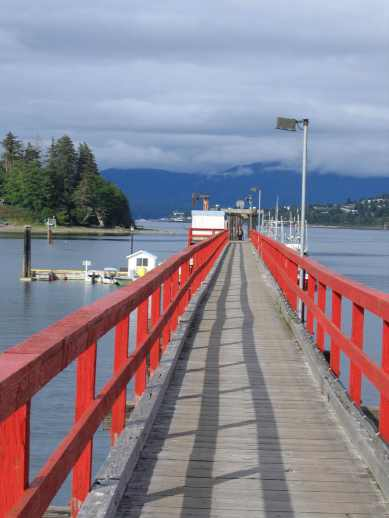
The Dodge Cove wharf

Dodge Cove is a small unincorporated community of fewer than 100 people, located on Digby Island, British Columbia, Canada across from the city of Prince Rupert. In April 2015, the community had an estimated total of 29 residents. Dodge Cove does not have paved roads, automobiles or shopping centres, and was named in 1907 after George Blanchard Dodge. It was built over a Tsimshian village named Kanagatsiyot. A commercial ferry service has been proposed to service the area and other nearby communities. In contemporary times, construction of a liquefied natural gas facility was proposed, which some of the community's residents oppose.

== Overview ==
Life is simple in Dodge Cove, with no paved roads, no stores or shopping centres, and no automobiles. It has been estimated to be among the ten smallest unincorporated communities in British Columbia. Some community residents commute to work at Prince Rupert by crossing Prince Rupert Harbour. Westcoast Launch is the water-taxi provider for residents and visitors. The taxi runs a few days per week, the schedule is season dependent. /> Community residents voted against the installation of a water filtration system in 2011 per concerns of "unaffordable user fees", and have been advised since 1988 to boil their water.

== History ==
Dodge Cove was named in 1907 by the Canadian Department of Marine and Fisheries, Ottawa, after George Blanchard Dodge of the Dominion Land Survey, who had surveyed Prince Rupert Harbour in 1906 for the Canadian federal government. The community was built over a Tsimshian village named Kanagatsiyot, which occupied the location for thousands of years. According to the mythology of the Tsimshian, this village was the birthplace of Txamsem, the Tsimshian trickster. Circa 1915, a salted herring business was run in Dodge Cove by Lionel Crippen.

== Today ==
=== Ferry service proposal ===
In March 2015, a proposal for a commercial ferry service between Prince Rupert and Dodge Cove, Oona River and Hunt's Inlet was presented to Des Nobels, the director of Dodge Cove, and Karl Bergman, director of Oona River. The proposal was based upon a request by the Skeena-Queen Charlotte Regional District for a report to be devised to look into the potential of a ferry service, which was researched and written by researcher Debra Febril. The community directors then proceeded to engage in their communities to determine interest among the people using a Community Needs Assessment Survey.

The proposal delineates year-round ferry service with a minimum of four weekly round-trips to Dodge Cove and three to Oona River and Hunt's Inlet. Vessel size was recommended by the regional district to carry at least 12 passengers along with additional room for freight and cargo. The report summarized that the respective communities and region would directly benefit from such a ferry service, and that the provision of a reliable, affordable and sustainable ferry system would be reliant upon balancing the needs of private and public entities. Annual revenue projections for the proposed ferry service to Dodge Cove are estimated to be $18,720–$22,464 for round-trip service five days a week, and around $86,112 for the round-trip service to Oona River and Hunts Inlet.

=== Proposed LNG facility ===
In September 2015, Dodge Cove residents voiced concerns about the proposed construction of a liquefied natural gas (LNG) facility by Aurora LNG on Digby Island. Aurora LNG is a joint venture among Nexen Energy and INPEX Gas British Columbia Ltd. Residents expressed concerns due to the proposed site's close proximity to the community and for the potential of the project to adversely affect the area's water supply and wetlands. Residents were also concerned about the facility separating the community from Lake Wahl. One survey found that 96% of the community's residents were opposed to the proposed project. Residents cited standards developed by the Society of International Gas Tanker and Terminal Operators, which recommend a 2.2 mile minimum hazard-free zone from LNG operations and carriers such as tankers, and demanded that the Government of British Columbia adhere to these standards.

In September 2014, 36 Dodge Cove residents signed a petition that was against the proposed facility and operations, which stated in part that the project would "alter our lives and community irreparably". Community director Des Nobels stated that preliminary activities performed by Nexen Energy, which is working to determine the feasibility of the LNG operation and performing environmental assessments, has disrupted life for community members due to helicopter traffic over the community. In response, Nexen stated that they would meet with community members regarding this matter.
