= List of World War II-era fortifications on the British Columbia Coast =

This is a list of World War II-era fortifications on the British Columbia Coast.

== North Coast ==
- Barrett Point 54°14′28″N 130°20′02″W
- Frederick Point, Digby Island, twin QF 12 pounder naval guns 54°15′19″N 130°21′49″W
- Casey Point, 2x25 pounders 54°16′33″N 130°21′36″W
- Fairview Point, 2x 8" railway guns 54°17′20″N 130°21′25″W
- Dundas Point 54°19′21″N 130°24′54″W
- Seal Cove 54°16′33″N 130°21′36″W
- Watson Island, ammunition depot, hospital, ocean dock (stores warehouse), and command post 54°14′00″N 130°18′00″W

== Central Coast ==
- Bella Bella – Two 75 mm guns and an anti-aircraft to protect the seaplane base 52°08′50″N 128°05′34″W
- Yorke Island coastal defence fort 50°26′57″N 125°58′35″W

== South Coast ==
- Fort Rodd Hill, originally built in the 19th century to defend Victoria and CFB Esquimalt 48°25′53″N 123°26′58″W
- Albert Head, 9.2-inch guns, counter bombardment battery during WWII 48°23′18″N 123°28′39″W
- Mary Hill 48°20′42″N 123°32′55″W
- Christopher Point Battery – 1941–44 - 2 × 8-inch M1888 American railway guns
- Duntze Head 48°25′52″N 123°26′22″W
- Ogden Point Battery – 1939–1943 with better guns replaced Breakwater Battery in 1944
- Black Rock battery – 1893–1956
- Macaulay Point, 3-gun battery dating back to 1878 48°25′05″N 123°24′33″W
- Golf Hill (WW II 1940–44 position), 2 × 12-pdr quick-firing anti motor torpedo boat (AMTB) guns
- Point Grey, 3 × 6-inch guns and director tower, now the site of the Museum of Anthropology at UBC, although one gun position and tunnel entrances remain. 49°16′10″N 123°15′35″W
- Ferguson Point, Stanley Park 49°18′03″N 123°09′28″W
- First Narrows Gantry, two 12-pdr QF guns. Demolished in the 1970s 49°19′06″N 123°08′11″W
- Steveston, one 18-pdr field gun, later replaced by two 25-pdr field guns Ordnance QF 25 pounder 49°08′00″N 123°11′00″W
- Signal Hill (Needs Restoration) 48°25′46″N 123°25′44″W
