= Yorke Island (Canada) =

Island in British Columbia, Canada

Coordinates: 50°26′47″N 125°58′38″W

Yorke Island coastal fort
- at the split of Johnstone Strait and Sunderland Channel between Vancouver Island and mainland British Columbia,

Site information
- Type: coastal fort
- Controlled by: Canada

Site history
- Built: 1938
- In use: 1938-46

Yorke Island is a small islet located off of the north end of Hardwicke Island in the south end of Johnstone Strait. Located in the Inside Passage, it occupies a choke point at the split of Johnstone Strait and Sunderland Channel which all vessels traveling between the mainland and Vancouver Island have to pass. As Hardwicke Island separates two channels offering passages between Vancouver Island and the mainland coast of British Columbia, Yorke Island was strategically placed to protect the entrances of what was considered the backdoor access to Vancouver during World War II.

== History ==
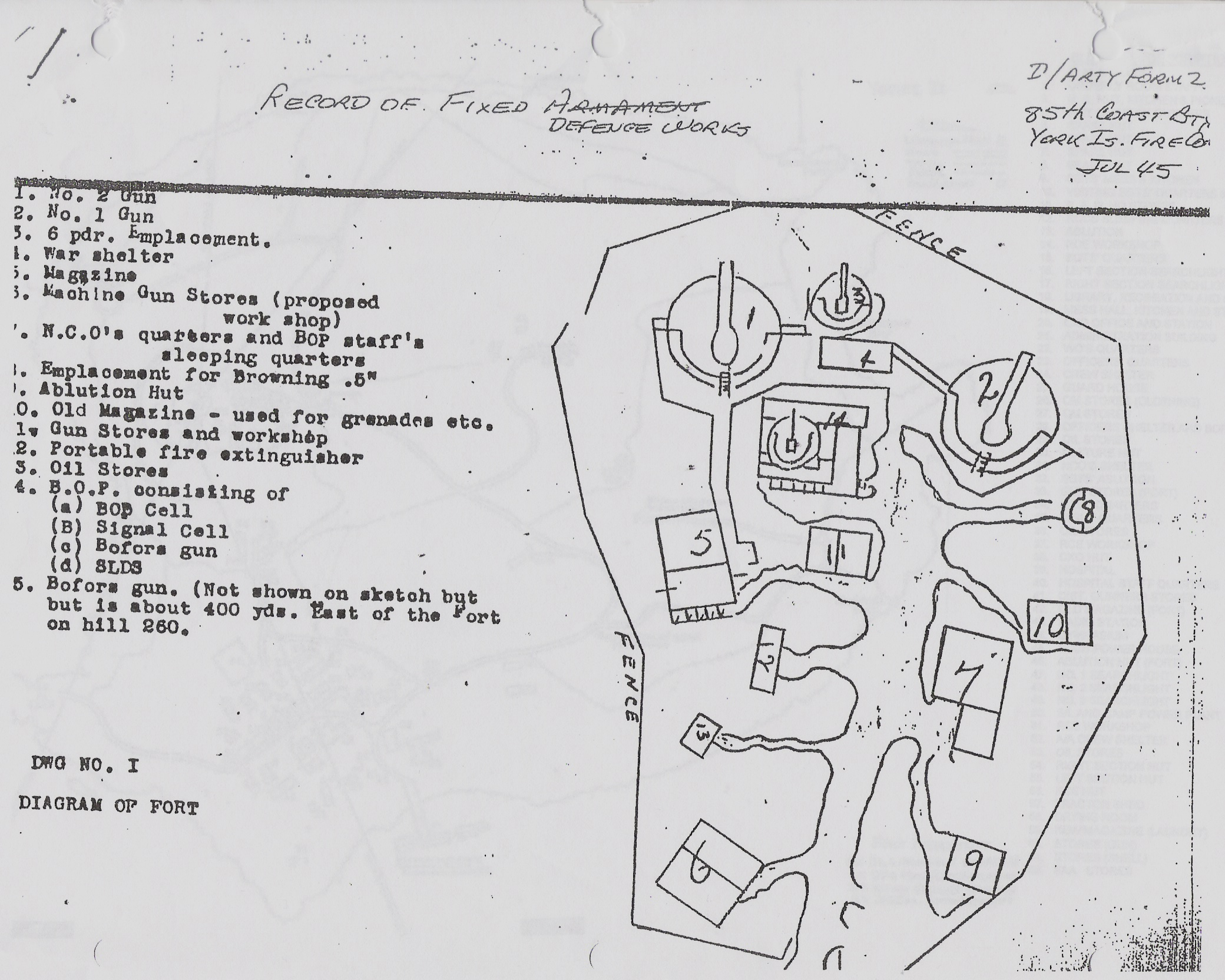
1945 schematic of Canadian military's fixed defence works on Yorke Island

In 1938 Major Treatt of the Canada War Department, inspected the west coast of Canada and determined suitable locations for coastal defences. Yorke Island was determined to be a suitable site. The site was equipped with two 4.7" Quick firing guns, later replaced by two 6" Mk7 guns on Mk 2 mounting (transferred from the Stanley Park Battery). Also fitted was a 6 pdr Hotchkiss "examination gun". Anti-aircraft defence was provided by two 40mm Bofors guns at two different sites. In all three 800 million carbon arc searchlights were positioned to maintain a night fighting ability. In addition examination vessels, nicknamed the "Gumboot Navy" due to the use of fishing vessels and their crew, were on station to assist the fort in examining all passing traffic.

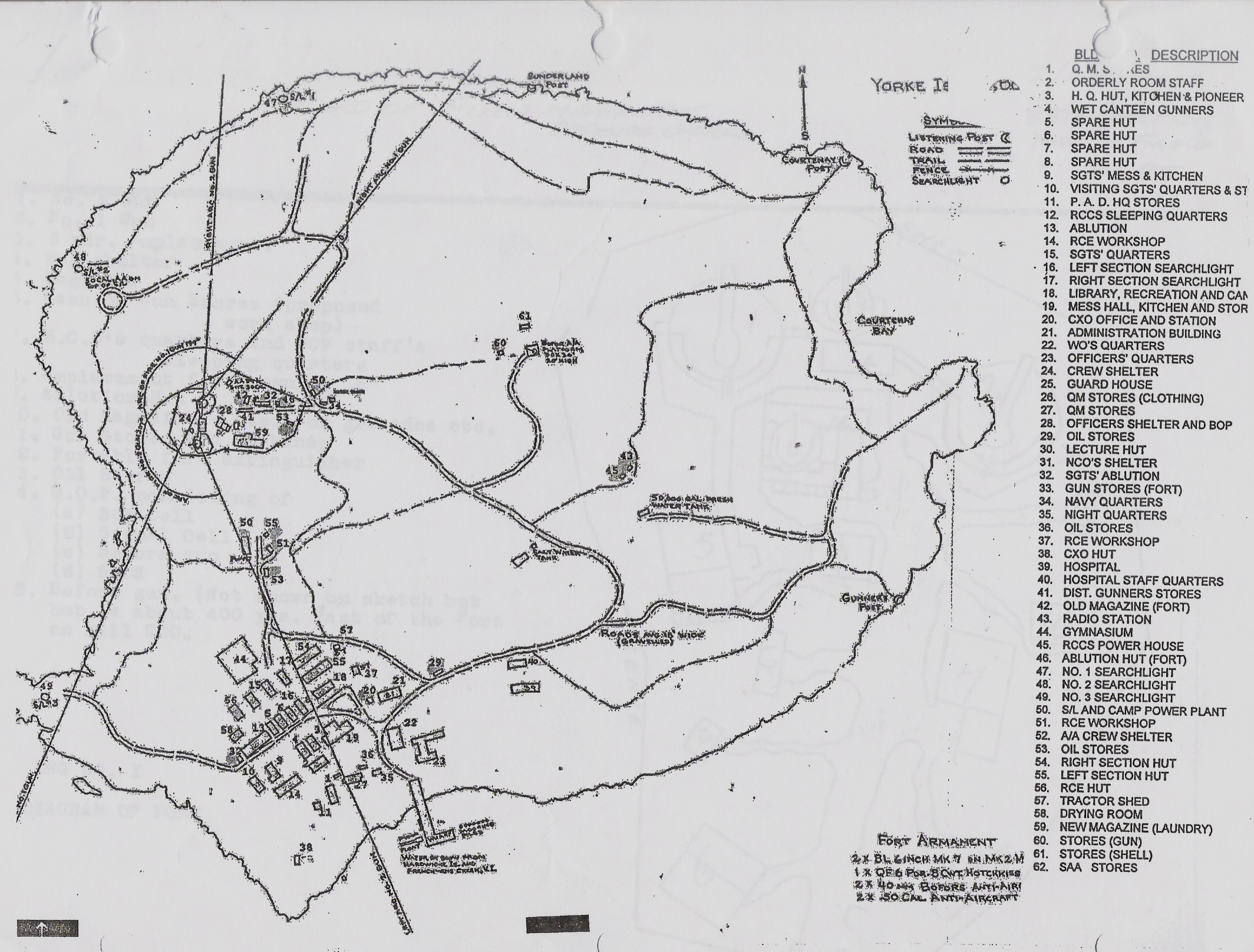
World War II era map of Yorke Island, showing Canadian military's infrastructure

Approximately 60 buildings were built to support the garrison. A major challenge with Yorke Island was a lack of drinking water. Water was at first supplied by Union Steam ships while dropping off construction materials. After this was determined to be too inefficient, a scow with a large tank was brought in to fill the 50000 gallon cement water tank via the nearest creek on Hardwicke Island. Filling this tank and its challenges led to the only death on Yorke, Gnr Brunt, when the skiff he and others were on was swamped returning from a maintenance trip to Hardwicke Island. Brunt's leg tangled in the boat tow line and he was lost when it sank. Efforts to recover him were not successful.

Yorke Island was an isolated post which combined with lack of action, the advent of the conscript act, and minimal contact with locals led to some discipline issues, nicknamed "Going Yorkie". Segregation was also a difficulty: some men served on the island at the same time did not meet until reunions were arranged well after the war.

As the threat of attack diminished the garrison was decommissioned and the fort was abandoned by early 1946.

== Today ==
Yorke Today

Although the fort is abandoned, Yorke Island itself is now a Conservancy protected under BC Parks. Recent efforts by volunteers and local groups have now allowed for a major cleanup at the fort. Trails have been cut and marked to areas of safe access and interest. Extensive remnants of the bunkers, gun emplacements, and buildings are accessible when one is on the island. Hobbyists with metal detectors are strongly cautioned against using them on the island due to the possibility of live ordnance left over from training purposes during the war. Safely accessing the island is a difficult and sometimes dangerous journey due to dangerous tides and winds. The safest access is in Courtenay Bay due to its protection from extreme flood and tidal action compared to the conditions found on the beach side near to the dock built during the Second World War. Explorers of the Island are strongly cautioned against random landings on the shore of the Island due to the prevalence of still effective barbed wire over most of the perimeter. The dock built during the Second World War was dismantled, meaning Courtenay Bay offers safest access to those requiring anchorage. There are no operators with permits to conduct tours of Yorke Island on shore at this time. Visitors should also be aware that there are no hidden rooms, bunkers, ordnance rooms, or anything other than what can be found out in plain site on the island. Recent visits have shown the use of ground penetrating radar (Suzie Guns) and damage to walls and floors in the main bunker trying to find these rooms as reported in an inaccurate Urban Exploration posting. Research shows the entire fort built on bedrock, with final construction involving over 100,000 cubic feet of concrete.

== See also ==
- List of World War II-era fortifications on the British Columbia Coast

== Sources ==
- "Forgotten Yorke Island". British Columbia Magazine. 2019-06-29.
- "Old B.C. fort was braced for Japanese invasion that never came". The Globe and Mail. 2011-11-08.
- "Photos: Yorke Island, then and now". The Globe and Mail. 2011-11-08. Archived from the original on 2011-11-22.
- Gilbert, Catherine Marie (2011). Yorke Island and the Uncertain War: Defending Canada's Western Coast During WWII. Ptarmigan Press.
