= Prince Rupert Airport =

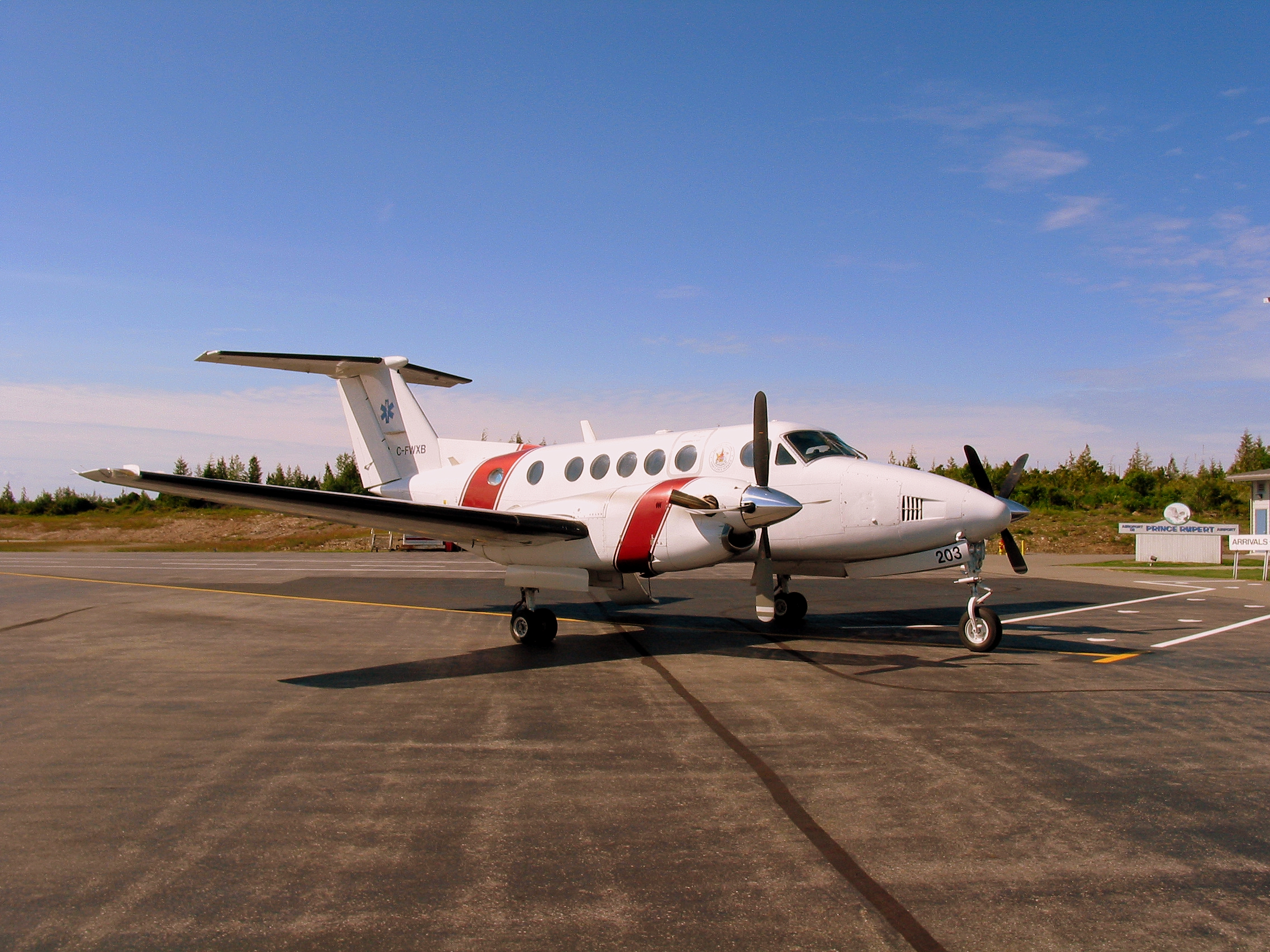
- IATA: YPR; ICAO: CYPR; WMO: 71022

Summary
- Airport type: Public
- Operator: Prince Rupert Airport Authority
- Location: Prince Rupert, British Columbia
- Time zone: MST (UTC−07:00)
- Elevation AMSL: 116 ft / 35 m
- Coordinates: 54°17′09″N 130°26′41″W
- Website: www.ypr.ca

Map
- Location in British Columbia CYPR (Canada)

Runways
| Direction | Length | | Surface |
| Direction | ft | m | Surface |
|---|---|---|---|
| 13/31 | 6,000 | 1,829 | Asphalt |

Statistics (2013)
- Aircraft movements: 2,164
- Passengers: 60,914
- Sources: Canada Flight Supplement; Environment Canada; Statistics from Prince Rupert Airport Authority

Prince Rupert Airport (IATA: YPR, ICAO: CYPR) is an airport located 5.0 nautical miles (9.3 km; 5.8 mi) west southwest of Prince Rupert, British Columbia, Canada.

The airport is classified as an airport of entry by Nav Canada and is staffed by the Canada Border Services Agency (CBSA). CBSA officers at this airport can handle general aviation aircraft only, with no more than 50 passengers.

The airport is located on Digby Island, which is only accessible by ferry from the city of Prince Rupert. The passenger ferry fare is included in airline tickets.

== Airlines and destinations ==
| Airlines | Destinations |
|---|---|
| Air Canada Express | Vancouver |
| Charter service by private arrangement | |

== Air cargo carriers and destinations ==
| Airlines | Destinations |
|---|---|
| SkyLink Express | Vancouver Air Cargo Charters |

== See also ==
- List of airports in the Prince Rupert area
- Royal eponyms in Canada
