= Casey Point =

Rock spur in the Mawson Escarpment, Antarctica

Casey Point (73°27′14″S 68°21′16″W) is a narrow rock spur separating Sheraton Glacier and Arriens Glacier in the Mawson Escarpment, Antarctica. It was plotted from ANARE aerial photographs taken in 1956, 1960 and 1973, and named by the Australian Antarctic Names and Medals Committee after J. N. Casey, (then) Assistant Director (Geology) of the Bureau of Mineral Resources, Geology and Geophysics, Australian Department of Minerals and Energy, Canberra.
