= Sarah de Leeuw =

Canadian writer

Sarah de Leeuw (born 1973) is a Canadian writer, researcher, and professor. She has authored several publications, including "Unmarked: Landscapes Along Highway 16," "Frontlines: Portraits of Caregivers in Northern British Columbia," "Geographies of a Lover," "Skeena," and "Where it Hurts." De Leeuw grew up in British Columbia and has a diverse background. She worked as a tug boat driver, logging camp cook, and journalist. She earned a Bachelor of Fine Arts in creative writing from the University of Victoria and a PhD in cultural/historical geography from Queen's University. As a Canada Research Chair in Humanities and Health Inequities at the University of Northern British Columbia, her research focuses on colonialism in British Columbia, determinants of Indigenous health, and the impact of medical programs in northern and rural areas. Her work has been recognized with awards, including the CBC Literary Award for creative non-fiction and the Dorothy Livesay Poetry Prize. In 2017, she was inducted into the Royal Society of Canada.

== Early life and education ==
A native of British Columbia, she grew up in Duncan, on the Queen Charlotte Islands (now Haida Gwaii) and Terrace. She worked as a tug boat driver, logging camp cook, and journalist. She earned a Bachelor of Fine Arts (BFA) in creative writing from the University of Victoria where she worked on the student newspaper, The Martlet and a PhD in cultural/historical geography from Queen's University.

== Career and research ==
de Leeuw, a Canada Research Chair (Humanities and Health Inequities), is a Professor with the Northern Medical Program and the National Collaborating Centre for Indigenous Health at the University of Northern British Columbia (UNBC). Her current research includes:

- Colonialism in British Columbia
- Determinants of Indigenous health
- Impact of medical programs in northern and rural geographies including doctor-patient relationships with Indigenous peoples
- Medical and health humanities.

Her books Unmarked: Landscapes Along Highway 16 (2004) and Frontlines: Portraits of Caregivers in Northern British Columbia (2011) reflect her interest in geography and small communities in British Columbia. Unmarked is a series of short essays, each linked to a specific place, evoking the local geography and community, and often linked to memories from de Leeuw's childhood. Frontlines is a series of biographical essays about people working in health care and their connections with community. Geographies of a Lover (2012), described by poet Nancy Holmes as "a true eco-erotic text that fuses the lonely carnality of body with the vulnerable vastness of continental landscapes" also represents de Leeuw's interest in human relationships with physical geography.

In 2009, de Leeuw won the CBC Literary Award for creative non-fiction with "Columbus Burning", and placed second the following year with "Quick-quick. Slow. Slow."

In 2013, Geographies of a Lover won the Dorothy Livesay Poetry Prize, the annual BC Book Book Prize for the best book of poetry by a British Columbian author.

In the fall of 2015, Caitlin Press published Skeena, a single poetic narrative spanning more than ninety pages that is an elegy to and celebration of British Columbia's second-longest river, one at the centre of contemporary conversations about resource extraction and northern geographies.

In the spring of 2017, NeWest Press published Where it Hurts, a collection of creative non-fiction pieces primarily focused on the difficulties of living in small communities in the British Columbia interior. Where it Hurts was selected as a finalist for the prestigious Governor General's Literary Award for non-fiction.

In the fall of 2017, de Leeuw was one of 70 scholars appointed to the Royal Society of Canada and inducted in the Society's Celebration of Excellence.
