= Albert Head, British Columbia =

Human settlement in British Columbia, Canada

Coordinates: 48°23′00″N 123°30′00″W

Albert Head is a neighbourhood in Metchosin, British Columbia, Canada, part of the Western Communities area of Greater Victoria, British Columbia, Canada. It is located around and named after the headland of Albert Head, which is Department of National Defence property. Canadian Forces Base (CFB) Esquimalt operates CFB Albert Head which contains the British Columbia Canadian Ranger Company of the 4th Canadian Ranger Patrol Group, CFB Esquimalt Range Control, the Naval Tactical Operations Group (MTOG) and previously the Regional Cadet Support Unit (Pacific) which hosted Cadet summer training at the camp. Albert Head Lagoon derives its name from the headland that was named by the Royal Navy for Prince Albert.

== Headland ==
The neighbourhood of Albert Head is located on the headland of Albert Head, named for Prince Albert, consort of Queen Victoria. It was surveyed and named in 1847 by Captain Henry Kellett on HMS Herald, due to its location across Royal Roads (then named Royal Bay) from the city of Victoria.

== Lagoon ==
Albert Head Lagoon was officially named after the headland of Albert Head in 1977, due to that name being long-established in local usage.

== See also ==
- List of World War II-era fortifications on the British Columbia Coast
- Royal eponyms in Canada
