= Kaien Island =

Island on the coast of British Columbia, Canada

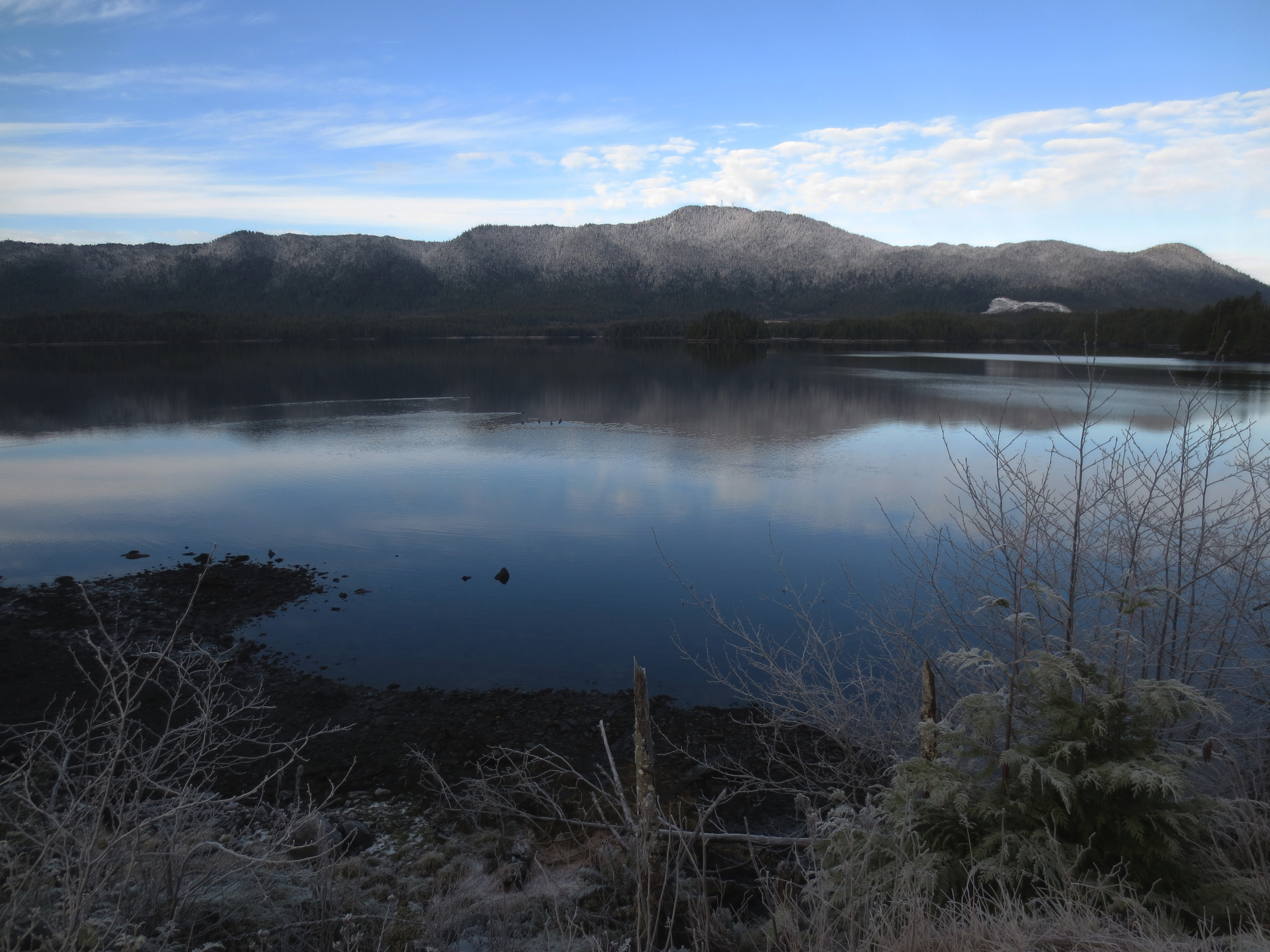
- Kaien Island, British Columbia
- Interactive map of Kaien Island

Geography
- Coordinates: 54.28274°N 130.30341°W
- Area: 45 km^{2} (17 sq mi)
- Length: 11 km (6.8 mi)
- Width: 6 km (3.7 mi)
- Highest elevation: 708 m (2323 ft)
- Highest point: Mount Hays

Administration
- Canada
- Province: British Columbia
- Regional district: North Coast Regional District

Demographics
- Ethnic groups: Tsimshian

Kaien Island is a Canadian island on the coast of British Columbia, just north of the mouth of the Skeena River and to the south of the Alaska Panhandle. The island has an area of about 45 km^{2} (11,000 acres), is roughly oval, and about 11 km (6.8 miles) long along its long axis. The island consists of a central mountain ridge, surrounded by coastal lowlands. The dominant central peak is Mount Hays, reaching 708 m (2,323 ft), with a secondary peak, Mount Olfield, reaching 555 metres (1,821 ft) to the northeast.

The island is contained within the North Coast Regional District and is part of the North Coast region. Tidal waters surrounding the island have a wide range which results in extensive exposure of mud flats and rock shoals that are prime habitat for invertebrates and intertidal fish.

Kaien Island is central to the traditional territories of the Tsimshian First Nations, and has been permanently settled for more than 5,000 years. The city of Prince Rupert is on the island. Casey Point is on the western extremity of the island, facing Digby Island, and was the site of one of the coastal defence installations to protect the BC Coast during World War II. Another such installation was at Seal Cove on the island's northern tip.

== Geology ==
Located within the Hecate Depression of the Coastal Trough, the island is a situated between the Coast Mountains and the continental shelf, and has been influenced by tectonic subsidence and glacial history. It has a central mountainous spine with peaks like Mount Hays 708 metres (2,323 ft), and surrounding lowlands, reflecting both deep-seated structural patterns and surface erosion.

The dominant bedrock of Kaien Island is amphibolite, dating to the early Mesozoic or Paleozoic. The bedrock strata on the island dip eastward at about 35°, suggesting deformation likely tied to regional tectonic forces. Within this bedrock, are inclusions of feldspathic schist, quartzite, and hornblende schist.

Surficial deposits include colluvial material, organic and alluvial sediments, with some glacial till from past glaciations. Deposits are largely glacio marine clays which in turn have weathered into organic fibrisols.

== Ecology ==
Kaien Island supports a Pacific temperate rainforest and marine–estuarine ecology shaped by high rainfall, cool temperatures, and strong ocean influence . The Island's ecology is notable for its tight coupling between land, freshwater, and marine systems, making the island ecologically resilient but also sensitive to disturbance. The island has long supported Tsimshian harvesting, stewardship, and settlement, and today its ecosystems remain central to regional biodiversity and cultural landscapes.

=== Terrestrial ===
Kaien Island lies within the Coastal Western Hemlock biogeoclimatic zone. Forests are typically dense, multi-layered, and moisture-rich, dominated by western hemlock, sitka spruce, western red cedar, and amabilis fir. The forest floor supports abundant mosses, lichens, ferns, and shade-tolerant shrubs such as salal, devil's club, and salmonberry. Poorly drained areas develop into muskeg and peatlands, characterized by shallow soils, sphagnum moss, sedges, Labrador tea, and stunted shore pine.

=== Freshwater and Estuarine ===
Island streams and wetlands drain into surrounding bays and inlets, which support a variety of pacific salmon species, including pink, chum, and coho. Local Estuaries include mudflats and salt marshes, eelgrass beds, brackish channels and tidal creeks which offer nursery habitat for juvenile fish, feeding grounds for shorebirds, and refuge for invertebrates.

=== Marine and Intertidal ===
The rocky and muddy shorelines host north pacific intertidal communities including, barnacles, mussels, rockweed, kelp, sea stars, crabs, chitons, and snails. The surrounding marine environment provides nutrient-rich waters driven by tidal mixing and freshwater input sustaining kelp forests and macroalgae, dungeness crab, pacific herring and forage fish, seals, sea lions, porpoises, and whales.

== See also ==
- Prince Rupert Harbour

== Images ==
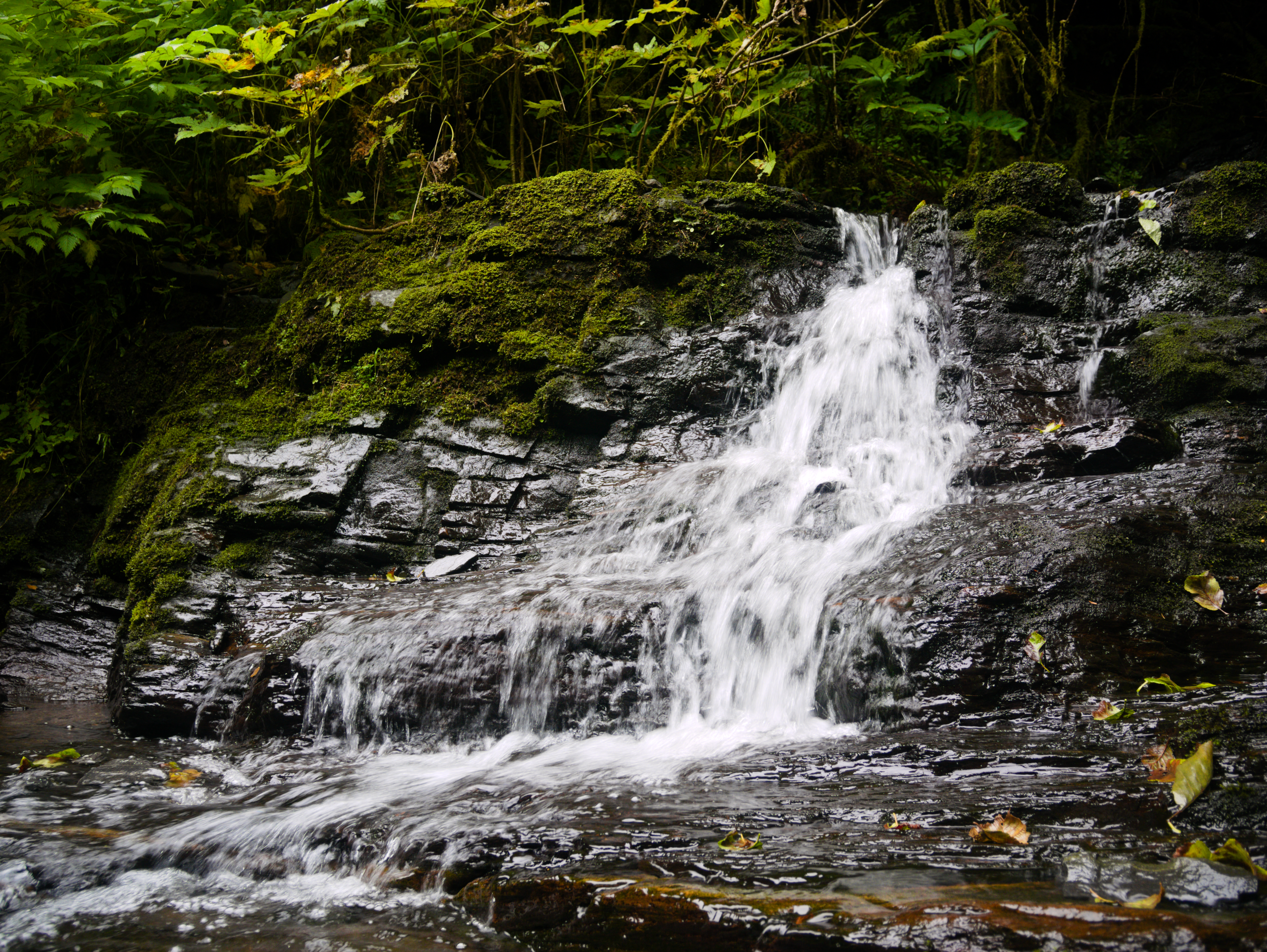
Stream cascades over metasedimentary amphibolite bedrock

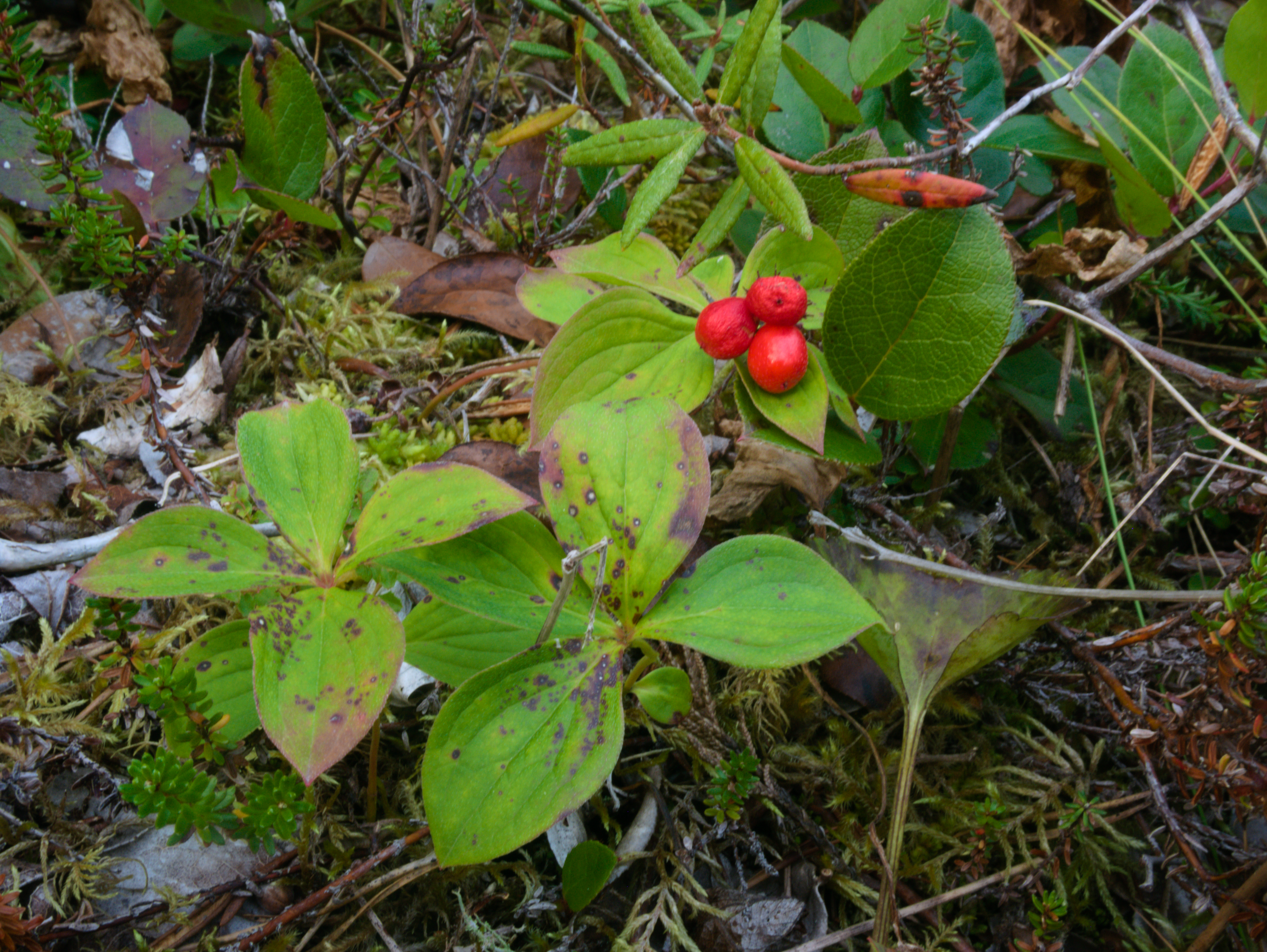
Dogwood Bunchberries in a bog

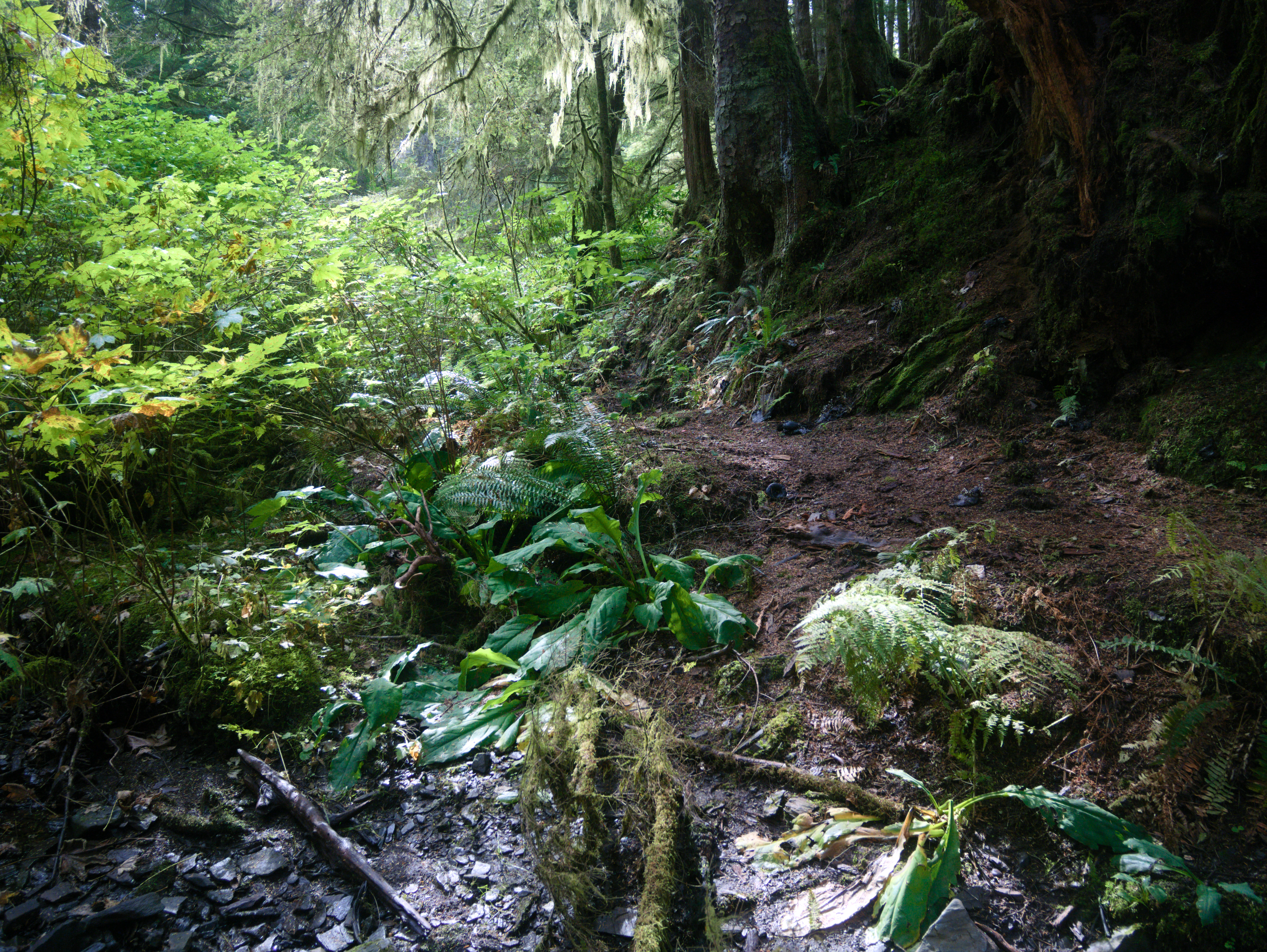
Coastal Rainforest in late summer
