= Digby Island =

Island in British Columbia, Canada

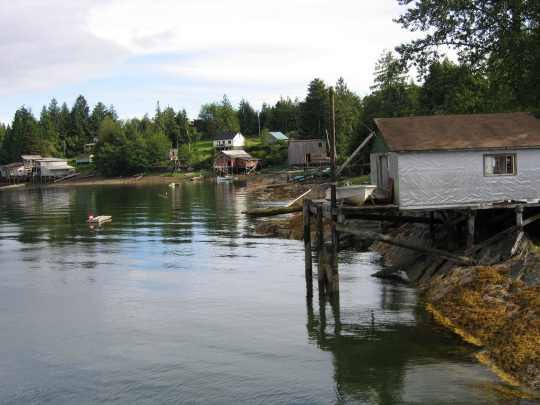
- The community of Dodge Cove on Digby Island

- Location in British Columbia

Geography
- Location: Chatham Sound
- Coordinates: 54.284°N 130.417°W

Administration
- Canada
- Province: British Columbia
- Regional district: North Coast Regional District

Demographics
- Population: 40 (2021)
- Ethnic groups: Tsimshian

Additional information
- Location of Prince Rupert Airport and naval WW II sites

Digby Island is a small island immediately west of Kaien Island, and the location of the city of Prince Rupert, British Columbia. The island is home to the Prince Rupert Airport and the communities of Dodge and Crippen coves.

The island was named for Henry A. Digby, an officer on HMS Malacca.

Prior to European colonization, the island was occupied by the Tsimshian for thousands of years. The Tsimshian trickster, Txamsem, was believed to have been born there in the village of Kanagatsiyot the current site of Dodge Cove.

== Ecology ==
The island supports hypermaritime, coastal western hemlock ecosystems, experiences strong marine influences with extremely high rainfall, and mild temperatures. Its forests are to the southern and eastern sides of the island, dominated by western hemlock, western redcedar, sitka spruce, and with thick moss layers, organic soils, and frequent wetlands.

== Features ==
=== Indian Reserve ===
A portion of Metlakatla S1/2 Tsimpsean IR 2 is located on the north end of the island.

=== Military Fortifications ===
Frederick Point on the southeast coast, was one of the coastal defences of Canada's west coast during World War II, along with other sites around Prince Rupert. Another such installation was at Dundas Point, on the northeast side of the island.

=== Airport ===
Prince Rupert Airport (IATA: YPR, ICAO: CYPR) is a regional airport located on a 686.78 ha (1,697.1 acres) parcel of land on the northwest side of Digby Island.

=== Ferry Terminal ===
Primarily landing point for airport passengers, located at Du Vernet Point the northeastern shore of Digby Island.
