= List of ship launches in 2007 =

The list of ship launches in 2007 includes a chronological list of ships launched in 2007.

Date	Ship	Class / type	Builder	Location	Country	Notes
12 January	NYK Vesta	Container ship	Hyundai Heavy Industries	Ulsan	South Korea	For NYK Line
15 January	Queen Victoria	Vista class cruise ship	Fincantieri	Marghera	Italy	For Cunard Line
23 January	Dauntless	Type 45 destroyer	BAE Systems Naval Ships (YSL)	Govan, Glasgow, Scotland	United Kingdom	
15 February	Aber-Wrach	Coastal maritime surveillance launch	Constructions Navales de Bordeaux	Noirmoutier-en-l'Île	France	French Navy
16 February	Tsingtao Express	Colombo-Express-class container ship	Hyundai Heavy Industries	Ulsan	South Korea	For Hapag Lloyd
21 February	Actuaria	Sietas type 178 container ship	Schiffswerft J.J. Sietas	Hamburg-Neuenfelde	Germany	For Peter Döhle Schiffahrts KG
24 February	Bahia Castillo	Bahia-class container ship	Daewoo Shipbuilding & Marine Engineering	Okpo	South Korea	For Hamburg Süd
4 March	AIDAdiva	Cruise ship	Meyer Werft	Papenburg	Germany	For AIDA Cruises
16 March	Max Linus Dede	Sietas type 168 container ship	Schiffswerft J.J. Sietas	Hamburg-Neuenfelde	Germany	For Reederei Friedhelm Dede
20 March	OOCL Southampton	OOCL SX-class container ship	Geoje	Samsung Heavy Industries	South Korea	For Orient Overseas Container Line
29 March	Erfurt	Braunschweig-class corvette	Nordseewerke	Emden	Germany	
7 April	Bahia Grande	Bahia-class container ship	Daewoo Shipbuilding & Marine Engineering	Okpo	South Korea	For Hamburg Süd
19 April	Coastal Renaissance	Coastal-class ferry	Flensburger Schiffbau-Gesellschaft	Flensburg	Germany	For BC Ferries
21 April	North Carolina	Virginia-class submarine	Northrop Grumman	Newport News, Virginia	United States	
21 April	Kornett	Sietas type 168 container ship	Schiffswerft J.J. Sietas	Hamburg-Neuenfelde	Germany	For Reederei Winfrid Eicke
25 April	Tor Corona	Finnbreeze-class RoRo-ferry	Jinling Shipyard	Nanjing	China	For Macoma Shipping
15 May	Richard E. Byrd	Lewis and Clark-class dry cargo ship	National Steel & Shipbuilding	San Diego, California	United States	
19 May	Sterett	Arleigh Burke-class destroyer	Bath Iron Works	Bath, Maine	United States	
19 May	Costa Serena	Cruise ship	Fincantieri	Sestri Ponente	Italy	For Costa Cruises
19 May	Bahia Laura	Bahia-class container ship	Daewoo Shipbuilding & Marine Engineering	Okpo	South Korea	For Hamburg Süd
2 June	Truxtun	Arleigh Burke-class destroyer	Ingalls Shipbuilding	Pascagoula, Mississippi	United States	
3 June	Baltic Ace	vehicle carrier	Stocznia Gdynia	Gdynia#	Poland	For Baltic Highway Limited
8 June	Astute	Astute-class submarine	BAE Systems Submarine Solutions	Barrow-in-Furness, Cumbria, England	United Kingdom	
8 June	Ventura	Grand-class cruise ship	Fincantieri	Monfalcone	Italy	For P&O Cruises
13 June	Jung Ji	Type 214 submarine	Hyundai Heavy Industries		South Korea	For South Korean Navy
15 June	Ida Rambow	Sietas type 178 container ship	Schiffswerft J.J. Sietas	Hamburg-Neuenfelde	Germany	For Reederei Rambow
23 June	CCNI Shenzen	Bahia-class container ship	Daewoo Shipbuilding & Marine Engineering	Okpo	South Korea	For Hamburg Süd
28 June	Oldenburg	Braunschweig-class corvette	Blohm + Voss	Hamburg	Germany	
7 July	Anne Sibum	SSW Super 1000 container ship	Schichau Seebeckwerft	Bremerhaven	Germany	For Reederei Bernd Sibum
20 July	Hannover Express	Colombo-Express-class container ship	Hyundai Heavy Industries	Ulsan	South Korea	For Hapag Lloyd
31 July	SuperSpeed 1	RoPax Ferry	Aker Finnyards	Rauma	Finland	For Color Line
3 August	Carnival Splendor	Concordia-class cruise ship	Fincantieri	Sestri Ponente	Italy	For Carnival Cruise Lines
12 August	Norwegian Gem	Jewel-class cruise ship	Meyer Werft	Papenburg	Germany	for Norwegian Cruise Line
18 August	Seychelles Prelude	Tanker	Lindenau GmbH	Kiel	Germany	
23 August	Hyūga	Hyūga-class helicopter destroyer	IHI Marine United		Japan	
24 August	Jan-Fabian	Sietas type 178 container ship	Schiffswerft J.J. Sietas	Hamburg-Neuenfelde	Germany	For Reederei Heinz-Georg Vöge
31 August	Coastal Inspiration	Coastal-class ferry	Flensburger Schiffbau-Gesellschaft	Flensburg	Germany	For BC Ferries
14 September	Maruba Victory	Type Stocznia Gdynia 8184-container ship	Stocznia Gdynia	Gdynia	Poland	
20 September	Viking XPRS	Cruiseferry	Aker Finnyards	Helsinki New Shipyard, Helsinki, Finland	Finland	For Viking Line
21 September	Tor Hafnia	Finnbreeze-class RoRo-ferry	Jinling Shipyard	Nanjing	China	For Seatreasure
22 September	Monte Tamaro	Monte-class container ship	Daewoo Shipbuilding & Marine Engineering	Okpo	South Korea	For Hamburg Süd
26 September	Ludwigshafen am Rhein	Braunschweig-class corvette	Lürssen	Bremen-Vegesack	Germany	
28 September	Eurodam	Signature-class cruise ship	Fincantieri	Marghera	Italy	For Holland America Line
23 October	Caio Duilio	Horizon-class frigate	Fincantieri	Riva Trigoso	Italy	
23 October	Tunku Abdul Rahman	Scorpène-class submarine	Direction des Constructions Navales	Cherbourg	France	For Royal Malaysian Navy
24 October	Kiel	Tugboat	Lindenau GmbH	Kiel	Germany	For Schlepp- und Fährgesellschaft Kiel
27 October	Robert E. Peary	Lewis and Clark-class dry cargo ship	National Steel & Shipbuilding	San Diego, California	United States	
27 October	tug	For Bugsier-, Reederei- und Bergungsgesellschaft	ASL Shipyard Pte. Ltd.	Bugsier 6	Singapore	
12 November	Perak	Kedah-class offshore patrol vessel	PSC-Naval Dockyard		Malaysia	
14 November	Pacific Voyager	container ship	China Changjiang National Shipping Group Nanjing Jinling Shipyard	Nanjing	China	
16 November	Delfborg		Ferus Smit	Leer	Germany	For Wagenborg Shipping
23 November	HNoMS Helge Ingstad	Fridtjof Nansen-class frigate	Navantia	Ferrol	Spain	For Royal Norwegian Navy
23 November	Bremen Express	Colombo-Express-class container ship	Hyundai Heavy Industries	Ulsan	South Korea	For Hapag Lloyd
27 November	Diamond	Type 45 destroyer	BAE Systems Naval Ships (YSL)	Govan, Glasgow, Scotland	United Kingdom	
November	Matrozos	Type 214 submarine	Hellenic Shipyards	Chaidari	Greece	For Greece Navy
5 December	Sōryū	Sōryū-class submarine	Mitsubishi Heavy Industries	Kobe	Japan	
6 December	Terengganu	Kedah-class offshore patrol vessel	PSC-Naval Dockyard		Malaysia	
8 December	Frauke	Sietas type 161 heavy lift vessel	J.J. Sietas	Hamburg-Neuenfelde	Germany	For SAL Heavy Lift
12 December	Clipper Panorama	Ro-Ro Ferry	Astilleros de Huelva		Spain	For Seatruck Ferries
14 December	Coastal Celebration	Coastal-class ferry	Flensburger Schiffbau-Gesellschaft	Flensburg	Germany	For BC Ferries
14 December	Mistral	Sietas type 178 container ship	Schiffswerft J.J. Sietas	Hamburg-Neuenfelde	Germany	For Reederei Heinz Moje
17 December	Beluga Skysails	Cargo ship	Volharding Shipyards	Harlingen	Netherlands	For Beluga Shipping
19 December	NYK Clara	Hyundai 2530 TEU type container ship	STX Offshore & Shipbuilding	Jinhae	South Korea	
20 December	New York	San Antonio-class amphibious transport dock	Northrop Grumman Ship Systems	Avondale, Louisiana	United States	
22 December	Combi Dock I	Combi Dock-class				For K/S Combi Lift
	Katsonis	Type 214 submarine	Hellenic Shipyards	Chaidari	Greece	For Greece Navy
