= Coastal Renaissance =

Canadian ferry operated by BC Ferries

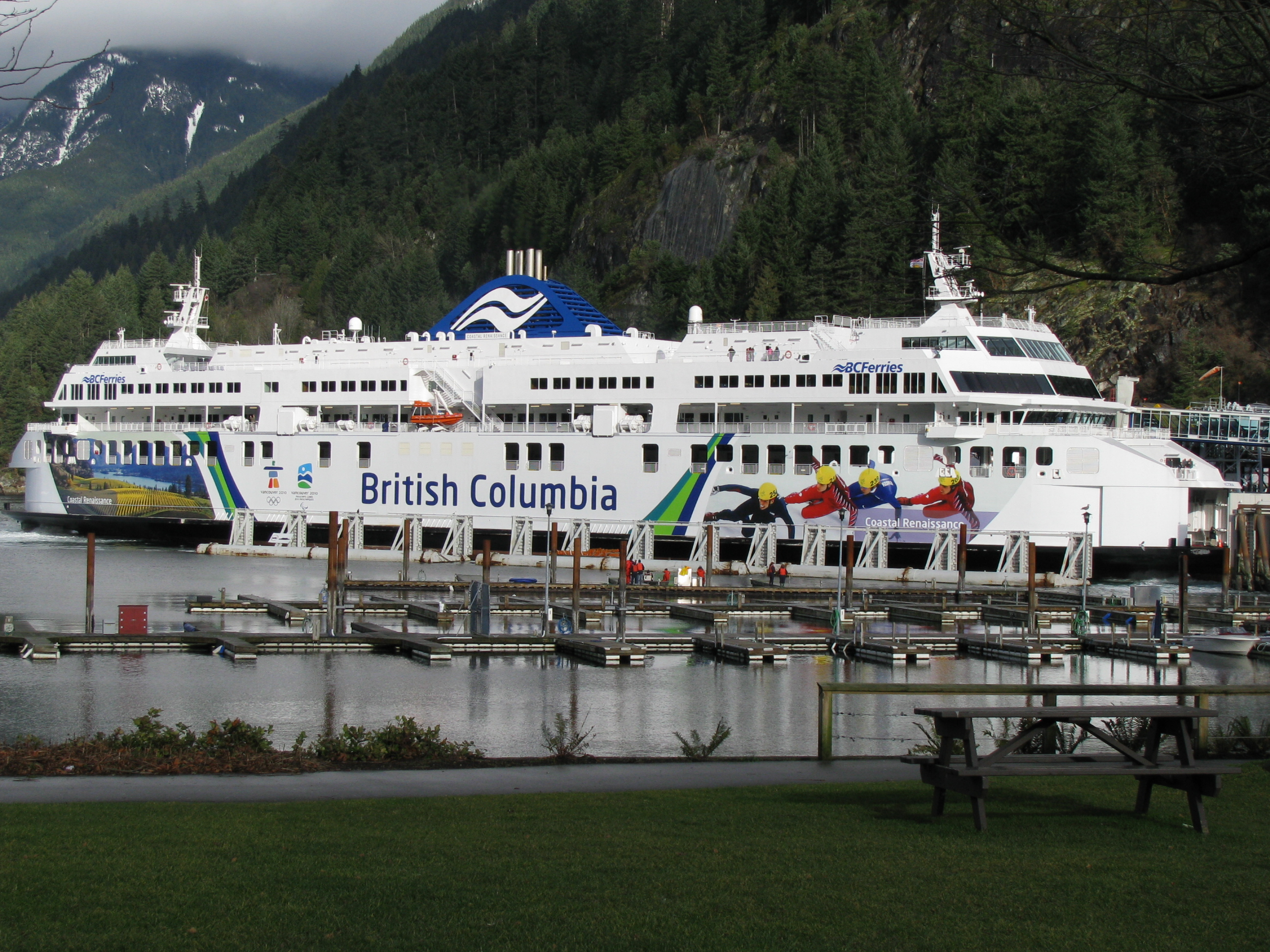
- Coastal Renaissance entering Horseshoe Bay ferry terminal on February 10, 2008

History
- Name: Coastal Renaissance
- Operator: BC Ferries
- Port of registry: (Canada) Victoria, British Columbia
- Route: Horseshoe Bay – Departure Bay Tsawwassen – Duke Point Tsawwassen – Swartz Bay
- Awarded: September 17, 2004
- Builder: Flensburger Schiffbau-Gesellschaft
- Yard number: 733
- Laid down: January 2, 2007
- Launched: April 19, 2007
- Completed: October 27, 2007
- In service: March 8, 2008
- Home port: Departure Bay Terminal
- Identification: IMO number: 9332755; Official number: 832105; Callsign: CFN4888
- Status: In service

General characteristics
- Class & type: Coastal-class ferry
- Tonnage: 21,777 GT; 2,366 DWT
- Displacement: 10,034 t (9,876 long tons) (max)
- Length: 160.0 m (524 ft 11 in) oa; 154.0 m (505 ft 3 in) pp
- Beam: 28.2 m (92 ft 6 in)
- Draught: 5.75 m (18 ft 10 in)
- Propulsion: 4 × diesel engines
- Speed: 23 knots (43 km/h; 26 mph)
- Capacity: 1,604 passengers & crew; 310 vehicles

Coastal Renaissance is the first of three Coastal-class ships delivered to BC Ferries. At the time of their construction, the Coastal-class ferries were the largest double-ended ferries in the world. This ship operates mainly on the Horseshoe Bay – Departure Bay and Tsawwassen – Duke Point routes in the peak season, and on the Swartz Bay – Tsawwassen route in the low season. She can also replace her sister ships on any of the major cross-Strait routes whenever they go in for refits.

== Description ==
Coastal Renaissance is a roll-on/roll-off ferry of the Coastal class. The vessel is 160.0 m (524 ft 11 in) long overall and 154.0 m (505 ft 3 in) between perpendiculars with a beam of 28.2 m (92 ft 6 in) and a draught of 5.75 m (18 ft 10 in). The vessel is 21,777 gross tonnage (GT) and 2,366 tons deadweight (DWT). The ferry has a maximum displacement of 10,034 tonnes (9,876 long tons). The vessel is powered by diesel engines driving two shafts rated at 21,444 horsepower (15,991 kW). The vessel has a maximum speed of 23 knots (43 km/h; 26 mph). (Note: The Miramar Ship Index has the maximum speed of the vessel at 21 knots (39 km/h; 24 mph).)

The vessel has capacity for 370 vehicles and a crew and passenger capacity of 1,604. Amenities aboard the ship include a Coastal Cafe, Coast Cafe Express, Sitka Coffee Place, Seawest Lounge, Passages Gift Shop, Kids Zone, Video Zone and a Pet Area.

== Service history ==
BC Ferries ordered three ferries from Flensburger Schiffbau-Gesellschaft (FSG), Germany. Coastal Renaissance was the first laid down, on January 2, 2007, with the yard number 733. The ferry was launched on April 19, 2007, and was completed on October 27, 2007. The name Coastal Renaissance was chosen by BC Ferries to represent the company's renewal. At the time of her construction, Coastal Renaissance was the largest double-ended ferry in the world. The ship left FSG for her delivery voyage to British Columbia on October 27, 2007. She transited the Panama Canal on November 21.

The ship arrived at Nanaimo on December 13, 2007, and entered service on March 9, 2008. The vessel sails the Departure Bay – Horseshoe Bay and Tsawassen – Swartz Bay routes. Coastal Renaissance carried the Olympic flame for Vancouver 2010.

In 2011, Coastal Renaissance replaced sister ship Coastal Inspiration on the Tsawwassen – Departure Bay route, after Coastal Inspiration rammed the ferry terminal at Duke Point. On October 25, 2017, Coastal Renaissance took part in a training exercise with members of the U.S. Coast Guard, Canadian Coast Guard and Canadian Forces, along with local agencies in Trincomali Channel.

In August 2023, Coastal Renaissance suffered an issue with her drive motor, and the vessel was removed from service for extensive repairs. The vessel's return to service was delayed at least twice; as of January 29, 2024, she was expected to return to service by early March. Repairs were expected to cost approximately $3 million. She returned to service on March 4, 2024, after being out of service for just under seven months.
