= Nanaimo Harbour =

Harbour on Vancouver Island, Canada

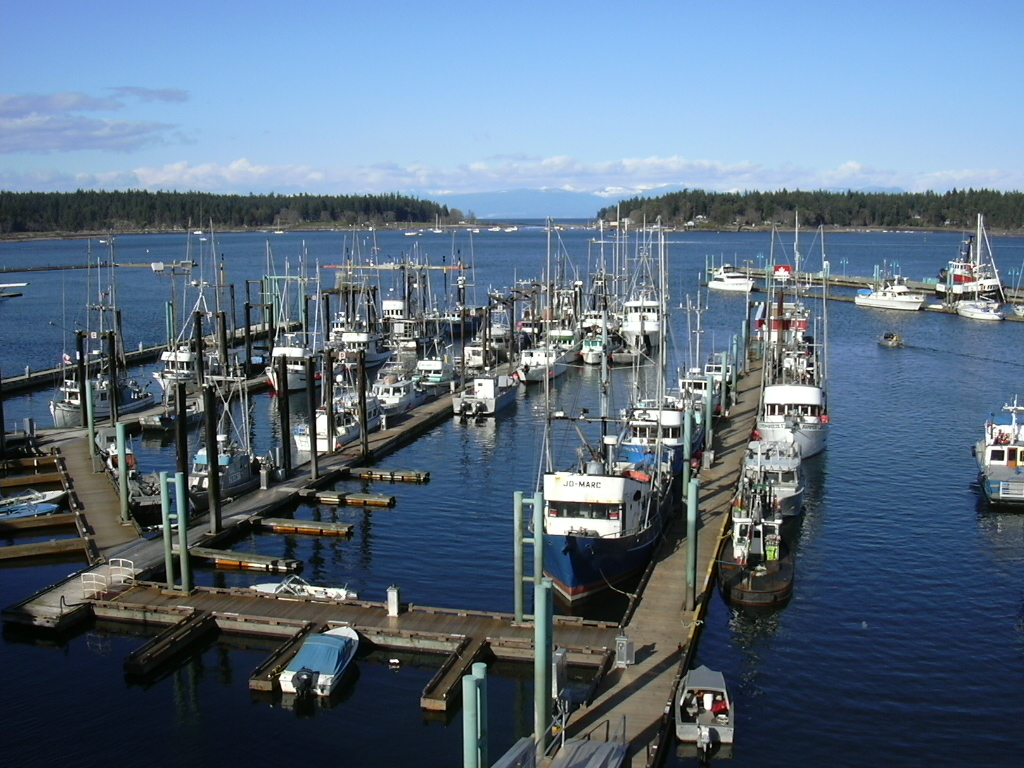
- Nanaimo Inner Harbour

- Location within British Columbia Location within Canada
- Location: Vancouver Island
- Coordinates: 49°09′55″N 123°55′35″W
- River sources: Nanaimo River; Chase River
- Ocean/sea sources: Strait of Georgia
- Basin countries: Canada
- Islands: Newcastle Island; Protection Island; Gabriola Island
- Settlements: Nanaimo

Nanaimo Harbour, also known as the Port of Nanaimo, is a natural harbour on the east coast of Vancouver Island in the Canadian province of British Columbia. The city of Nanaimo runs along the west side of the harbour. Three islands, Newcastle, Protection, and Gabriola, along with Duke Point, form the eastern edge. The Port of Nanaimo includes the Inner Harbour, Nanaimo River estuary, Departure Bay, the waters on the east side of Newcastle and Protection Islands, and Northumberland Channel. The port is under the management of the Nanaimo Port Authority.

== History ==
Long before Europeans arrived, the indigenous Coast Salish lived in the area and used the harbour, its islands, bays, and inlets for hunting, fishing, gathering, and shelter. They built longhouses from the abundant supply of timber surrounding the harbour.

The first European in the area was a Spanish Naval Officer in 1791 named Juan Carrasco. He named the bay Bocas de Winthuysen. Carrasco also named several other places in the area such as Gabriola Island, Galiano Island, Valdes Island, and Porlier Pass. Though the Spanish had claims in the region since the early 1500s, they did not exert any significant control over the area. The British had a competing claim from when Captain James Cook landed at Nootka Sound on the west coast of Vancouver Island in 1778. In 1792, Captain George Vancouver sailed into the Salish Sea as well and unexpectedly met up with another Spanish expedition, led by Jacinto Caamaño. With both Spain and Britain claiming the region, tensions were building. This led to the Nootka Crisis and eventual Nootka Convention. Spain relinquished all claims to Vancouver Island in 1795, paving the way for British colonisation and development.

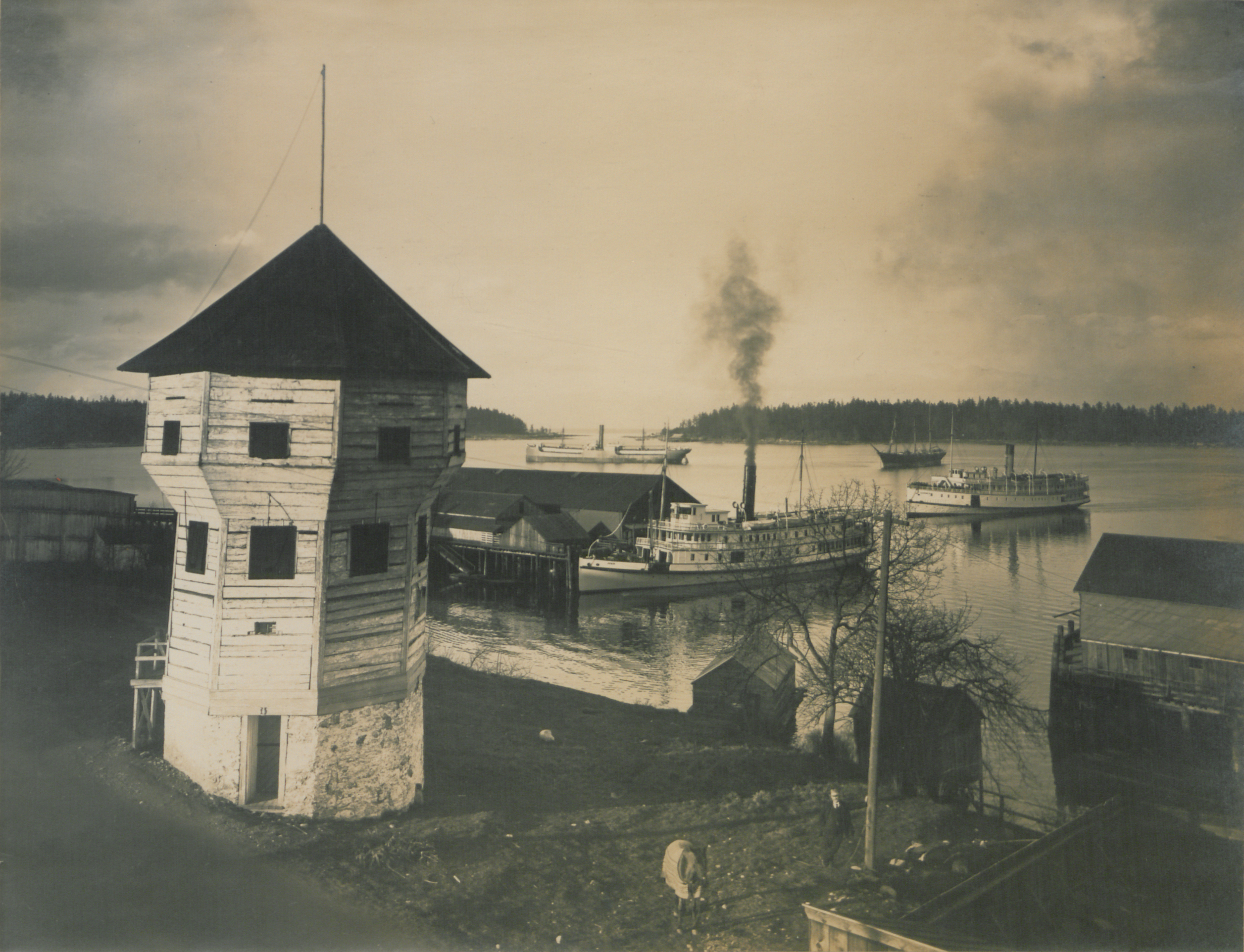
View of Nanaimo Harbour showing the Bastion and passenger vessels

In 1849 the Colony of Vancouver Island was established and the Hudson's Bay Company (HBC) was given a ten-year lease over it. By this time, HBC was transitioning from the fur trade to resource development. In 1850 Coal Tyee, chief of the Snuneymuxw First Nations, travelled from his village on the Nanaimo Harbour to Fort Victoria with coal, prompting the governor James Douglas to visit the future site of Nanaimo. In 1853 the Hudson's Bay Company built a fort called the Nanaimo Bastion in the Nanaimo Harbour to protect the new coal mining interests in the region. Twenty-four settlers from England arrived in 1854 marking the first European settlement on the harbour. They named the new community Colvile Town, which by 1860 would be renamed Nanaimo.

Besides coal, the area surrounding the harbour had an abundance of other natural resources, such as timber, fish, and sandstone. Soon multiple saw mills, canneries, and quarries sprung up. The deep, sheltered natural harbour made an excellent port to export the resources to market.

=== Harbour infilling ===
Coal mine tailings were used to fill in the harbour in and around downtown Nanaimo starting in the late 1800s, most notably the filling of Commercial Inlet. Commercial Inlet was a tidal ravine that divided downtown along modern-day Terminal Avenue. The Nanaimo Port Authority and the Commercial Inlet Basin and Marina sit at the entrance to Commercial Inlet. From that point, the inlet went inland along the modern-day roads of Museum Way and Gordon Street to the intersection of Terminal Avenue and Commercial Street. From there it banked north along Terminal Avenue to just past Campbell Street. In 1923, more of the area around the entrance to the inlet was filled in with tailings by the Canadian Western Fuel and Electric Company. Nanaimo Central Sports Field was built on the newly filled in area. The city of Nanaimo bought the sports field in 1948 for $1.00 and a portion was sold in 1951 for commercial uses while the rest became Piper Park in 1952. Currently Port Place Shopping Centre occupies most of the original land while Piper Park, which is the location of the Nanaimo Museum, has been reduced to a 1.1-acre green knoll above Front St and adjacent to Vancouver Island Conference Centre.

Filling in of the harbour continued late into the 20th century with the additions of Swy-A-Lana Park in 1984 and the waterfront promenades beginning in 1988.

== Nanaimo Port Authority ==
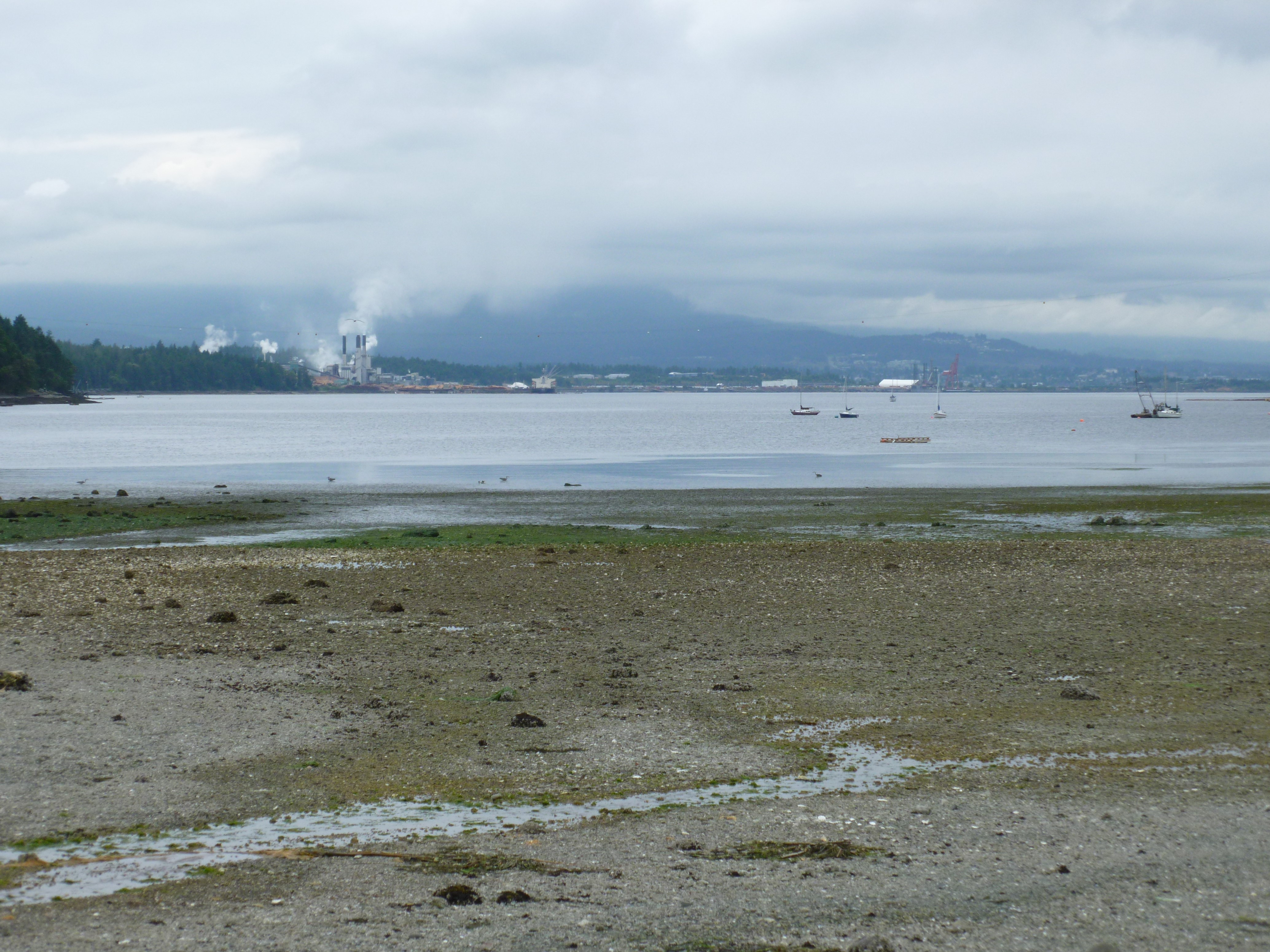
Harmac Pacific, Duke Point, and Nanaimo Harbour viewed from Brickyard Beach on Gabriola Island

The Nanaimo Port Authority was created in 1998 by the Canada Marine Act. The act created port authorities across Canada to manage the operation of 19 of Canada's 20 most economically important seaports. The Nanaimo Port Authority is located in the Inner Harbour at the Commercial Inlet Basin and Marina in downtown Nanaimo.

The Nanaimo Port Authority, also known as the Port of Nanaimo, administers, controls, and manages the harbour, waters and foreshore adjacent to Nanaimo, British Columbia, Canada.

In August 2013 the Nanaimo Port Authority hosted a North American conference of port authorities. Then Canada's Minister of Transport, Lisa Raitt, was one of the keynote speakers.

The Port of Nanaimo features two seaports, one downtown Nanaimo called Nanaimo Assembly Wharf and the other at the south-east corner of the harbour at Duke Point. The Nanaimo Assembly Wharf has two deep sea berths, "B" and "C", each 200 metres in length. "B" is 12.4 m deep while "C" is 11.7 m deep. The Duke Point Wharf has one berth that is 170 m long and an alongside depth of 13.5 m. Two line dolphins add 54 additional metres north and south for a total of 278 m. There is also a roll on/roll off (RORO) barge ramp that can handle barges up to 51 m long.

== Geography ==
The Port of Nanaimo includes Departure Bay, the Inner Harbour, and Northumberland Channel, which is the body of water between Gabriola Island and Duke Point. The defined limits of the port run from Horsewell Bluffs at Stephenson Point, on the north-east shore of Departure Bay, to Malaspina Point on Gabriola Island. On the south end of Northumberland Channel, the harbour limits are Dodd Narrows and False Narrows at Mudge Island. The bay of Nanaimo Harbour itself, often called the Inner Harbour, is contained within the body of water between downtown Nanaimo, Newcastle Island, Protection Island, Gabriola Island, Duke Point, and the Nanaimo River estuary.

=== Geographical features ===
The following is a list of named rivers and creeks that flow into Nanaimo Harbour:

- Nanaimo River starts in the Vancouver Island Ranges of central Vancouver Island and flows east and into the harbour at the south end at the Nanaimo River estuary.
- Chase River starts south-west of Mount Benson and flows into the harbour at the Nanaimo River estuary.
- Millstone River starts at Brannen Lake in north-western Nanaimo and flows through the city emptying into the harbour on the northside of downtown by the Queen Elizabeth II Promenade. Several lakes in the city, including Long Lake, Westwood Lake, Cathers Lake, and Buttertubs Marsh are all in the river's drainage basin.
- Beck Creek is a short river that flows into the Nanaimo River estuary between the Nanaimo and Chase Rivers. It starts at Beck Lake near the community of South Wellington.
- Cottle Creek is a short river that starts in northern Nanaimo in a marsh on the south side of Cottle Hill in Linley Valley. From there it heads east into Cottle Lake and then into Departure Bay on the east side of the Pacific Biological Station. North Cottle Creek starts on the north side of Cottle Hill at Lost Lake and flows south where it meets Cottle Creek at Cottle Lake. Much of the river's basin is in the Linley Valley Cottle Lake Park.
- Departure Bay Creek is a short river that starts in the Departure Bay neighbourhood and flows through Woodstream and Wardropper Parks and into Departure Bay at Departure Bay Beach.
- Northfield Creek is a short river that flows though Beach Estates Park and into Departure Bay just west of the Departure Bay ferry terminal.

== Transportation ==
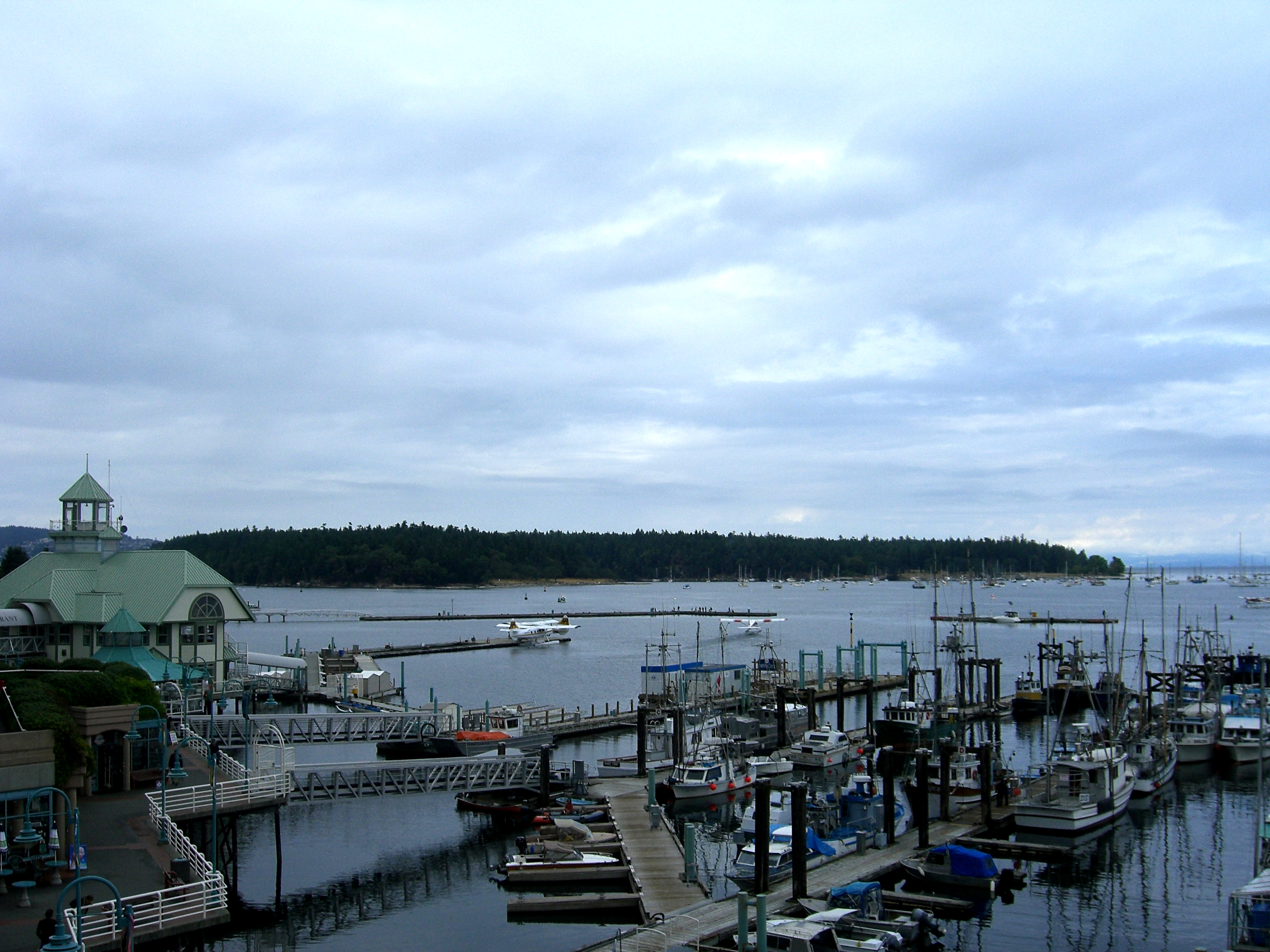
Nanaimo Harbour Water Aerodrome and marina

Nanaimo Harbour is serviced by several ferry terminals, two main highways, a Seaplane terminal, and a freight railway.

BC Ferries operates three routes from in the harbour. The Nanaimo Harbour ferry terminal has service from downtown Nanaimo in the Inner Harbour across over to Descando Bay on Gabriola Island. Duke Point ferry terminal services a route across the Strait of Georgia to the Tsawwassen ferry terminal on the Lower Mainland. The third BC Ferries route leaves from the Departure Bay ferry terminal and goes to the Horseshoe Bay ferry terminal in West Vancouver. Besides the BC Ferries, two other passenger ferries operate in the harbour, both of which are foot passenger only. From the marina downtown Nanaimo, a small ferry travels a regularly scheduled route to Dinghy Dock Pub on Protection Island. The other is one that travels from Maffeo Sutton Park in downtown Nanaimo to Newcastle Island. Seaspan operates a ferry terminal at Duke Point that transports cargo to and from the Lower Mainland.

Out of the harbour, right downtown Nanaimo, Nanaimo Harbour Water Aerodrome operates seaplanes that have regularly scheduled routes to the Lower Mainland and Sunshine Coast as well as charters to Tofino.

Two main highways service various parts of the port. Highway 19 services the terminals at Duke Point, including the BC Ferries terminal, and Highway 1 services the downtown terminals and the Departure Bay Ferry terminal.

Southern Railway of Vancouver Island provides freight rail service to the downtown Nanaimo Assembly Wharf. Rail service is not provided to Duke Point.

== The Pacific Biological Station ==
The Pacific Biological Station, located on the north shore of Departure Bay, was established in 1908. It is the oldest fisheries research centre on the Pacific coast. Operated by Fisheries and Oceans Canada, the station forms a network with eight other scientific facilities.

== Parks and recreation ==
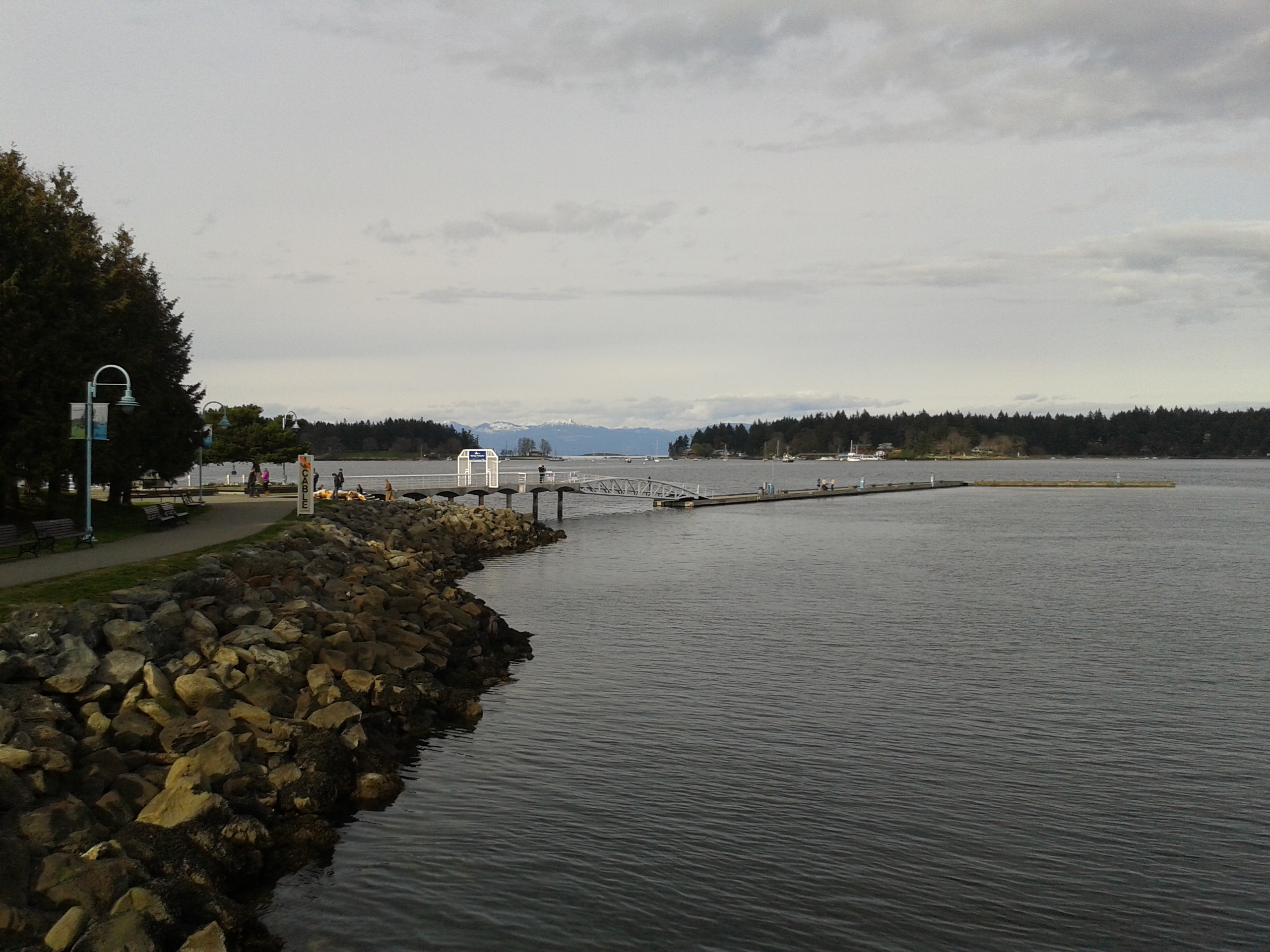
Swy-A-Lana Lagoon Fishing Pier as viewed from the Harbourfront Walkway in downtown Nanaimo. The channel that separates Newcastle and Protection Islands is visible with the mountains of mainland British Columbia in the far background.

In 1967 the first annual bathtub race took place in Nanaimo. The race originally went from downtown Nanaimo across the Strait of Georgia to Vancouver. From the mid-1990s onward, the course was changed to a route that travelled just around the Nanaimo Harbour.

Three ships have been sunk around Nanaimo Harbour to create artificial reefs. HMCS Saskatchewan was a 366-foot Canadian destroyer that was scuttled in 1997. HMCS Cape Breton was a 442-foot World War II Victory Class ship that was scuttled in October 2001. The 150-foot tugboat Rivtow Lion, originally Christened HMRT Prudent, was sunk in 2005 and was a World War II ship from the British Navy.

There are several parks around the harbour, with the largest being Newcastle Island Marine Provincial Park. Some of the other notable parks around the harbour include:

- Jack Point and Biggs Park, at Duke Point
- Joan Point Park, Northumberland Channel
- Cable Bay Trail, Northumberland Channel
- Descanso Bay Regional Park, Gabriola Island
- Gallows Point Light Park, on Protection Island
- Chase River Estuary Park, Chase River estuary
- Maffeo Sutton Park, downtown Nanaimo
- Swy-A-Lana Lagoon, downtown Nanaimo
- McGregor Park, downtown Nanaimo
- Queen Elizabeth II Promenade, north of downtown by the Millstone River Estuary
- Harbourfront Walkway, along Newcastle Island Channel
- Beach Estates Park, by the Departure Bay ferry terminal
- Kinsman Park, Departure Bay Beach
- Piper Park, downtown waterfront
