= Coastal-class ferry =

Ferry class in British Columbia, Canada

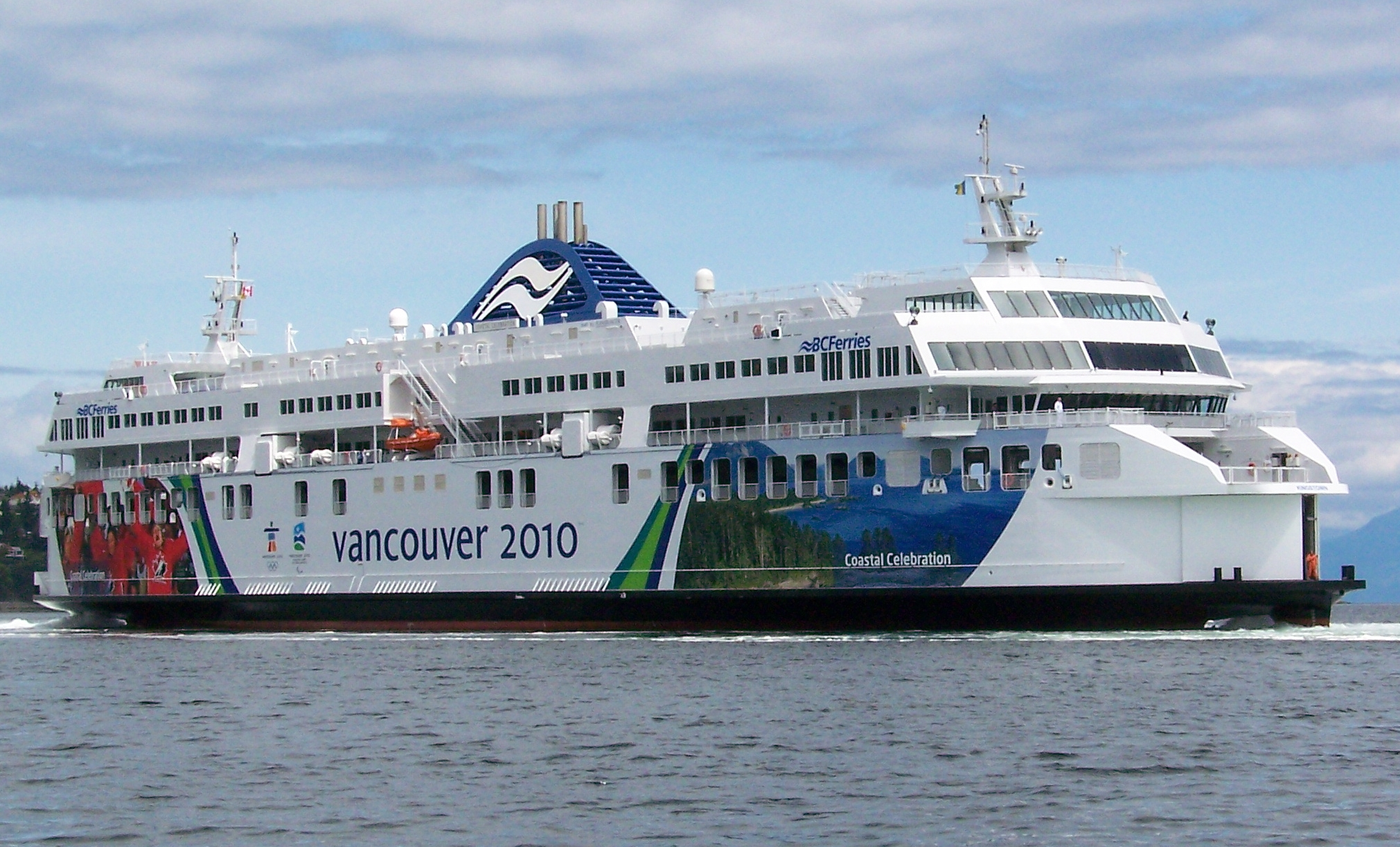
- Coastal Celebration arrives at Departure Bay

Class overview
- Builders: Flensburger Schiffbau-Gesellschaft, Flensburg, Germany
- Operators: BC Ferries
- Preceded by: Victoria class; Cowichan class
- Built: 2007–2008
- In service: 2008–present
- Completed: 3
- Active: 3

General characteristics
- Type: Double-ended, roll-on/roll-off ferry
- Tonnage: 2,366 DWT; 21,777 GT
- Displacement: 10,034 t (9,876 long tons)
- Length: 160.0 m (524 ft 11 in) oa; 156.0 m (511 ft 10 in) pp
- Beam: 28.2 m (92 ft 6 in)
- Draught: 5.6 m (18 ft 4 in) max
- Decks: 7
- Installed power: 21,444 hp (15,991 kW)
- Propulsion: 4 × MaK 8M32C diesel engines
- Speed: 23 knots (43 km/h; 26 mph)
- Capacity: 1,604 passengers and crew; 310 vehicles

Coastal-class ferries, also known as the "Super-C class" are three ferries owned and operated by BC Ferries of British Columbia, Canada and were built at the Flensburger Schiffbau-Gesellschaft shipyard in Flensburg, Germany. They are the second-largest ships in the BC Ferries fleet, surpassed only by the two larger, single-ended Spirit-class ferries. At the time of their building, the three ships were the largest double-ended ferries in the world, however the record has since been surpassed.

The three ferries (Coastal Renaissance, Coastal Inspiration and Coastal Celebration) were ordered by BC Ferries to replace the aging V-class ferries. They operate on three of the busiest routes connecting the Lower Mainland to Vancouver Island: Tsawwassen↔Swartz, Tsawwassen↔Duke Point, and Horseshoe Bay↔Departure Bay.

== Description ==
The Coastal class of ferries is composed of three ships, Coastal Renaissance, Coastal Inspiration and Coastal Celebration. At launch they were the largest double-ended ferries in the world. The three ships are 160.0 metres (524 ft 11 in) long overall and 154.0 metres (505 ft 3 in) between perpendiculars with a beam of 28.2 metres (92 ft 6 in). They have a maximum draught of 5.6 metres (18 ft 4 in). All three vessels have the same maximum displacement of 10,034 tonnes (9,876 long tons), but have varying tonnages; Coastal Renaissance and Coastal Celebration have a gross tonnage (GT) of 21,777 and Coastal Inspiration, a GT of 21,980. Coastal Renaissance has a deadweight tonnage (DWT) of 2,366, Coastal Inspiration, a DWT of 1,770 and Coastal Celebration, a DWT of 2,350.

The ships are powered by four 8-cylinder MaK 8M32C diesel engines driving two 11 MW (15,000 hp) electric motors turning two controllable pitch propellers. The engines are split into two main compartments and each compartment can run independently. The engines are rated at 21,444 horsepower (15,991 kW). The ferries have a maximum speed of 23 knots (43 km/h; 26 mph) and a cruising speed of 18 knots (33 km/h; 21 mph). The vessel has seven decks, with the passenger deck on Deck 6, above the two bridges on Deck 5, with additional passenger spaces between the two bridges on Deck 5. The class has a capacity of 1,604 passengers and crew and 2,001 metres (6,565 ft) lane space for 310 full-sized family vehicles. Initial reports stated the vessels could carry 1,650 passengers and crew and 370 cars. Amenities aboard each ferry include a Coastal Cafe, a Coast Cafe Express, Sitka Coffee Place, lounge, gift shop, and children's and pet areas.

== Ships in class ==
Coastal class
Name	Builder	Laid down	Launched	Completed	Status
Coastal Renaissance	Flensburger Schiffbau-Gesellschaft, Flensburg, Germany	January 2, 2007	April 19, 2007	October 27, 2007	In service
Coastal Inspiration	Flensburger Schiffbau-Gesellschaft, Flensburg, Germany	April 23, 2007	August 31, 2007	February 8, 2008	In service
Coastal Celebration	Flensburger Schiffbau-Gesellschaft, Flensburg, Germany	September 3, 2007	December 14, 2007	May 9, 2008	In service

== Acquisition and service ==
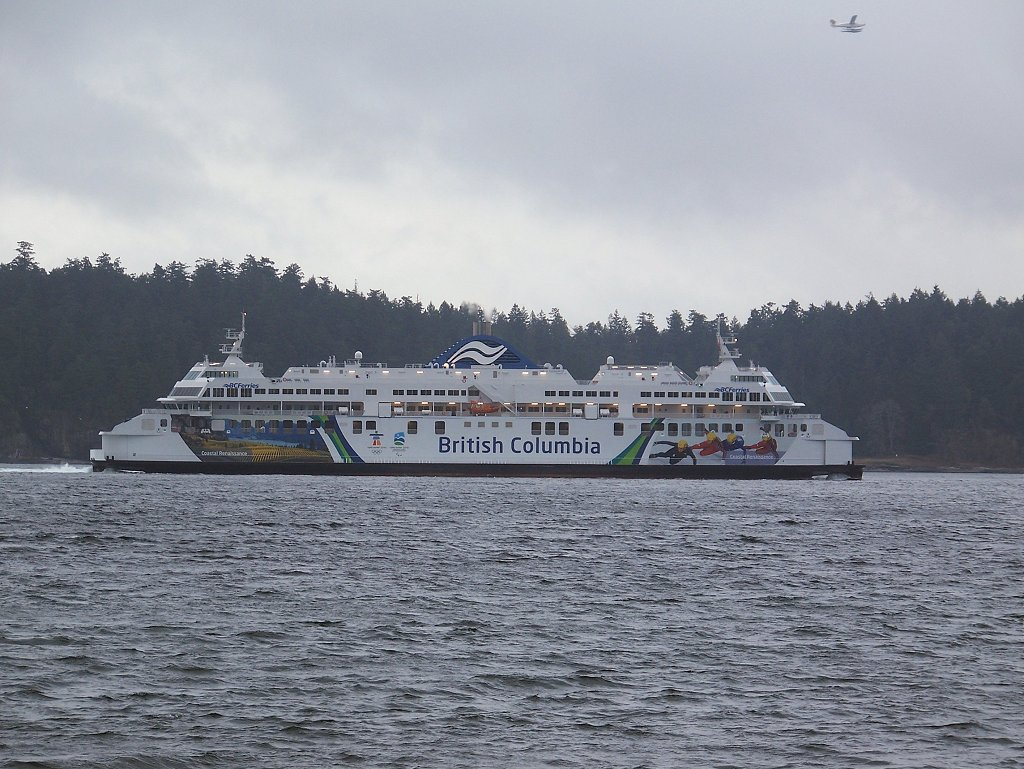
Coastal Renaissance entering Departure Bay on December 13, 2007

The vessels were ordered from Flensburger Schiffbau-Gesellschaft shipyard in Flensburg, Germany in September 2004 for €206.4 million. According to BC Ferries at this time, this was 40 percent lower than the lowest Canadian shipyard's bid. This was a controversial decision, which led to Canadian shipbuilders protesting the decision. The first new Coastal-class vessel, Coastal Renaissance, departed for British Columbia on October 27, 2007, and arrived on December 13, 2007. She entered service on the Departure Bay to Horseshoe Bay run on March 8, 2008. She was followed by Coastal Inspiration, which left Germany on February 9 and arrived March 25, and Coastal Celebration, which departed on May 9 and arrived on June 18. The vessels' names were based on submissions received during a "naming contest" in late 2005.

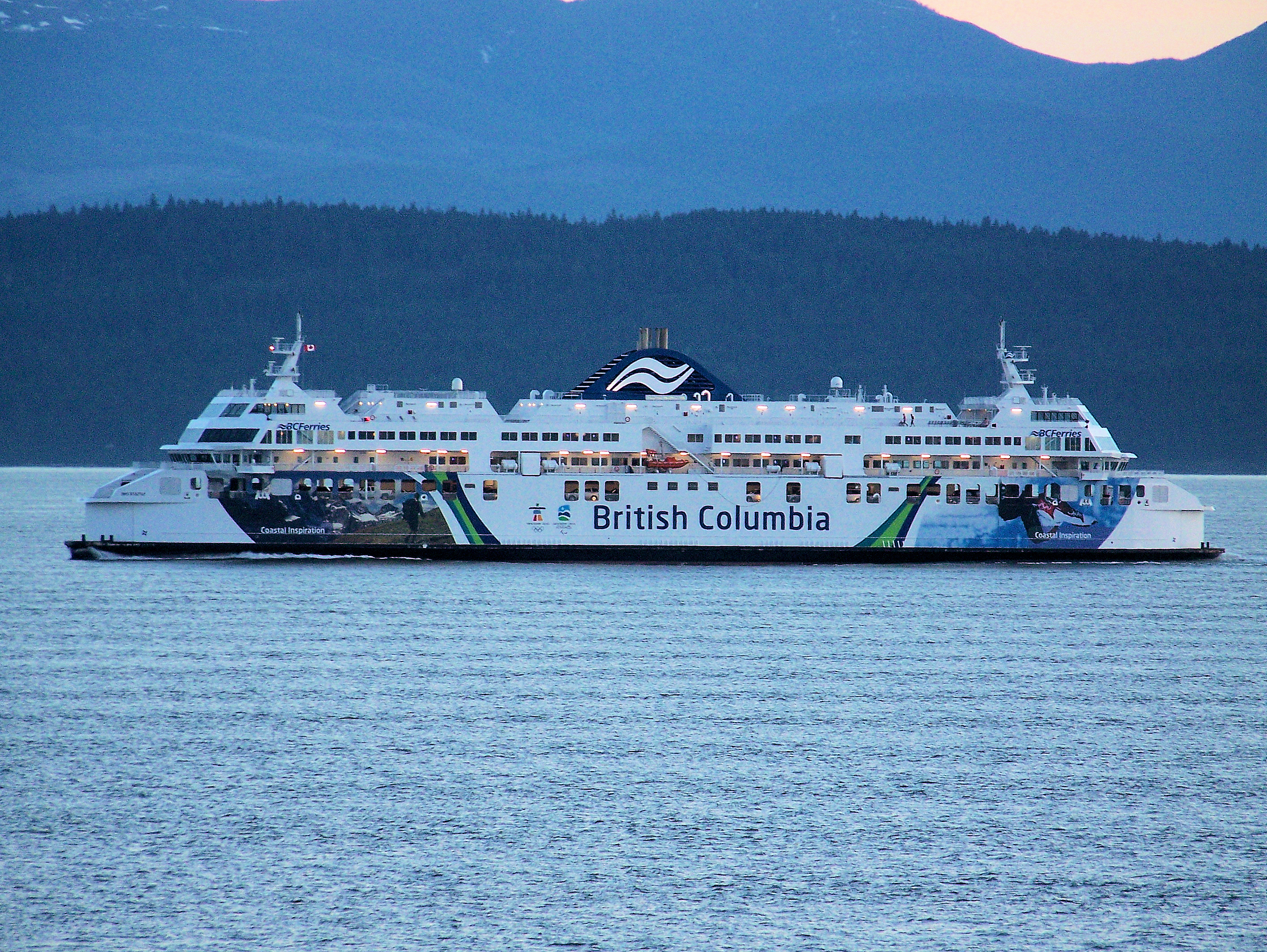
Coastal Inspiration in the Strait of Georgia on June 25, 2008

Coastal Renaissance and Coastal Inspiration operate on the Duke Point to Tsawwassen route. Coastal Celebration serves the Swartz Bay to Tsawwassen route. Coastal Renaissance also serves the Horseshoe Bay to Departure Bay route during peak seasons.

On December 20, 2011, Coastal Inspiration collided with the terminal at Duke Point while travelling at 5 knots (9.3 km/h; 5.8 mph), damaging the lower vehicle ramp at the terminal and causing damage to the vessel. 16 were injured in the collision and the bow door, the starboard side shell, and the rubbing plate on the ship were damaged. Coastal Inspiration was then redirected to the Departure Bay terminal with the assistance of a tugboat to disembark passengers and vehicles. The ship was out of service for 122 days. The cause of the crash was later found to be crew error.

In August 2023, Coastal Renaissance suffered an issue with her drive motor, and the vessel was removed from service for extensive repairs. The vessel's return to service was delayed at least twice. Repairs are estimated to have cost approximately $3 million. She returned to service on March 4, 2024, after being out of service for just under seven months.

Preceded by PacifiCat & S-class	BC Ferries Mainland-Island flagship 2008–present	Succeeded by incumbent
