= Coastal Celebration =

Ship built in 2008

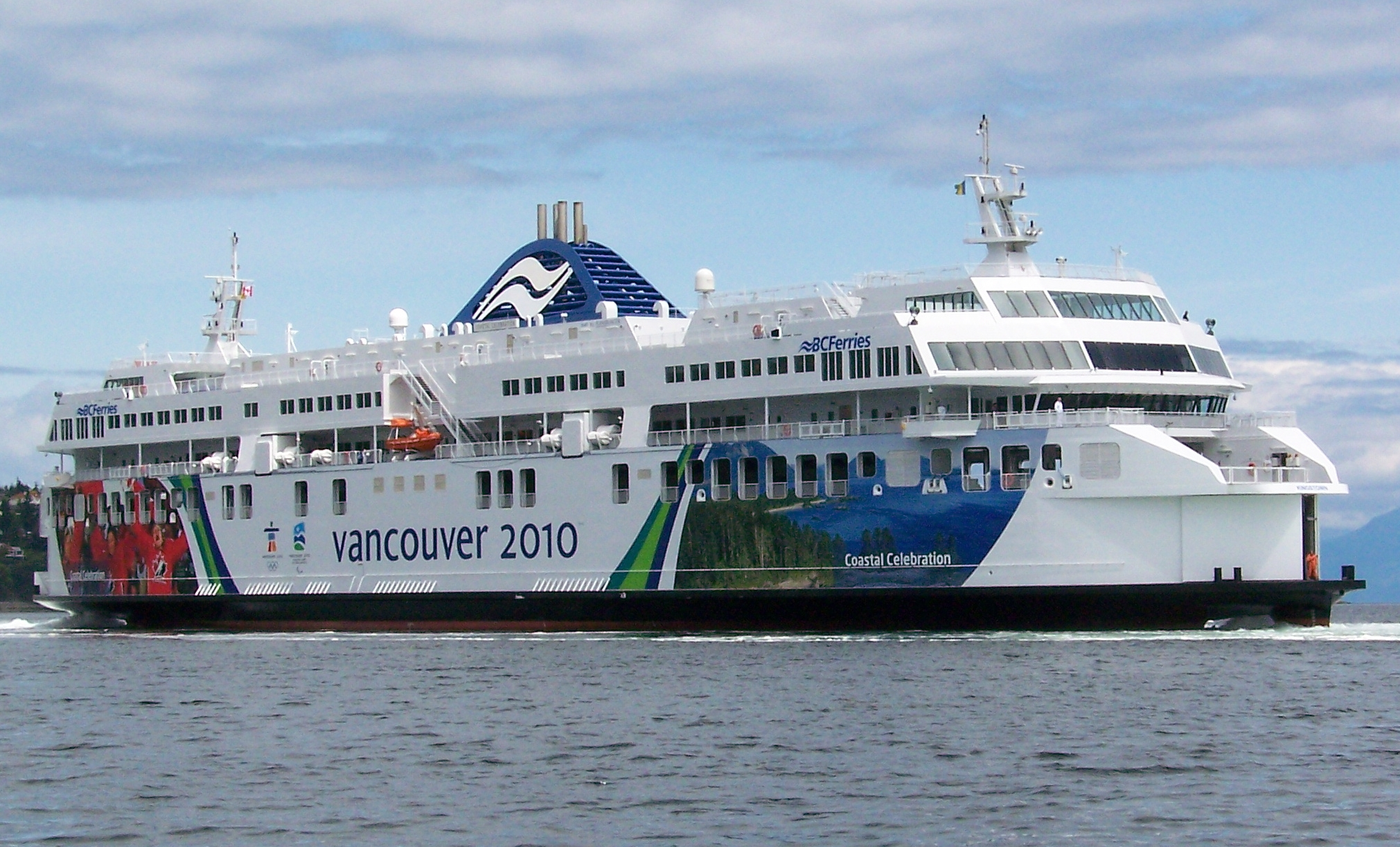
- Coastal Celebration arriving at Departure Bay on June 18, 2008.

History

Canada
- Name: Coastal Celebration
- Operator: BC Ferries
- Port of registry: Victoria, British Columbia
- Route: Swartz Bay–Tsawwassen
- Awarded: September 17, 2004
- Builder: Flensburger Schiffbau-Gesellschaft
- Yard number: 735
- Laid down: September 3, 2007
- Launched: December 14, 2007
- Completed: May 9, 2008
- In service: November 21, 2008
- Home port: Swartz Bay
- Identification: IMO number: 9332779; Official number: 832800; Callsign: CFN5145
- Status: In active service

General characteristics
- Class & type: Coastal-class ferry
- Tonnage: 21,777 GT; 2,350 DWT
- Displacement: 10,034 t (9,876 long tons; 11,061 short tons) (max)
- Length: 160 m (524 ft 11 in) oa.; 154 m (505 ft 3 in) pp.
- Beam: 28.2 m (92 ft 6 in)
- Propulsion: MaK/Caterpillar 8M32C Diesel-electric system, 2 × shafts; 21,444 hp (15,991 kW)
- Speed: 23 knots (43 km/h; 26 mph)
- Capacity: 1,604 passengers and crew; 310 vehicles

Coastal Celebration is the third and final Coastal-class ship to be delivered to BC Ferries. The class comprises some of the largest double-ended ferries in the world. The vessel completed construction in 2008 and entered service the same year. Unlike her sister ships, Coastal Renaissance and Coastal Inspiration, Coastal Celebration was equipped with a Pacific Buffet for service on the Swartz Bay to Tsawwassen route, until it was discontinued during the COVID-19 pandemic, and then closed permanently in June 2023.

== Description ==
Coastal Celebration is a Coastal-class ferry in the BC Ferries fleet. They are among the largest double-ended ferries in the world. It has a gross tonnage (GT) of 21,777 tons, a deadweight tonnage (DWT) of 2,350 tons and a maximum displacement of 10,034 tonnes (9,876 long tons; 11,061 short tons) (max). The vessel is 160 metres (524 ft 11 in) long overall and 154 metres (505 ft 3 in) between perpendiculars with a beam of 28.2 metres (92 ft 6 in). Coastal Celebration has a diesel-electric propulsion system driving two shafts rated at 21,444 horsepower (15,991 kW) and a maximum speed of 23 knots (43 km/h; 26 mph). (Note: The Miramar|Miramar Ship Index has the maximum speed at 21.5 knots (39.8 km/h; 24.7 mph).)

The vessel has a capacity of 1,604 crew and passengers and 310 vehicles. Coastal Celebration's amenities include a Pacific Buffet, a Coastal Cafe, a Coast Cafe Express, a Seawest Lounge, a Passages Gift Shop, a Kids Zone, a Video Zone, a pet area, work/study stations, elevators, and accessible washrooms.

== Service history ==
The third and final vessel in its class, Coastal Celebration's keel was laid down on September 3, 2007 by Flensburger Schiffbau-Gesellschaft of Flensburg, Germany with the yard number 735. The vessel was launched on December 14, 2007 and completed construction on May 9, 2008. Coastal Celebration was named as such by BC Ferries "to reflect the anticipated celebration that BC Ferries and its customers will have". The vessel left Flensburg on May 9, 2008, made a promotional stop in London, England on May 12, 2008, transited the Panama Canal on June 1 and arrived in British Columbia on June 18. Coastal Celebration was assigned the Swartz Bay-Tsawwassen ferry route servicing Vancouver and Victoria, British Columbia.

On May 5, 2011, Coastal Celebration damaged the dock at Swartz Bay after the vessel reversed into it for roughly 6.1 to 10.7 metres (20 to 35 ft). An investigation found that this was due to an error on the bridge. No one was hurt in the incident. However, damage to Coastal Celebration and the berth at Swartz Bay cost CAN$470,000. On November 4, 2015, while the ship was sailing from Tsawwassen to Swartz Bay, a man launched one of Coastal Celebration's 100-person life rafts and jumped overboard. The man then swam to Galiano Island while the ferry recovered the life raft and launched rescue craft to recover the man. The man was later arrested on the island after breaking into a house, but was not charged. On December 17, 2018, Coastal Celebration rescued a man from a sinking vessel near Moresby Passage in stormy conditions. All remaining sailings from Tsawwassen to Swartz Bay were cancelled that night.
