= Departure Bay =

Bay in British Columbia, Canada

Coordinates: 49.192011°N 123.954556°W

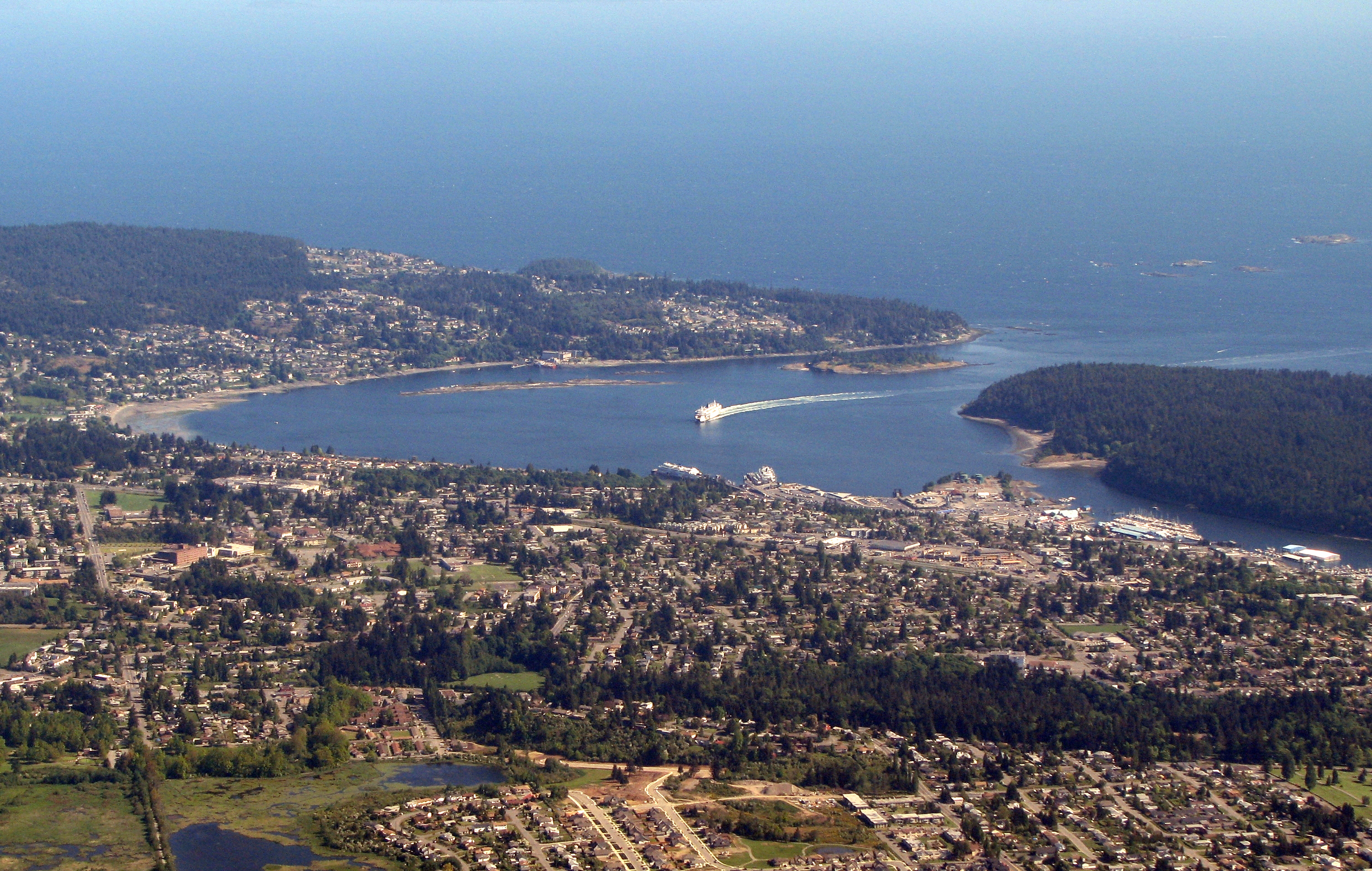
Departure Bay. To the right of the image is Newcastle Island. A BC Ferries ship can also be seen entering the bay, with two other ships already docked at the terminal.

Departure Bay is a bay in central Nanaimo, British Columbia, on the east coast of Vancouver Island. The surrounding neighbourhood is also referred to as "Departure Bay" —once a settlement of its own, it was integrated into the city of Nanaimo in the 1970s.

== Geography ==
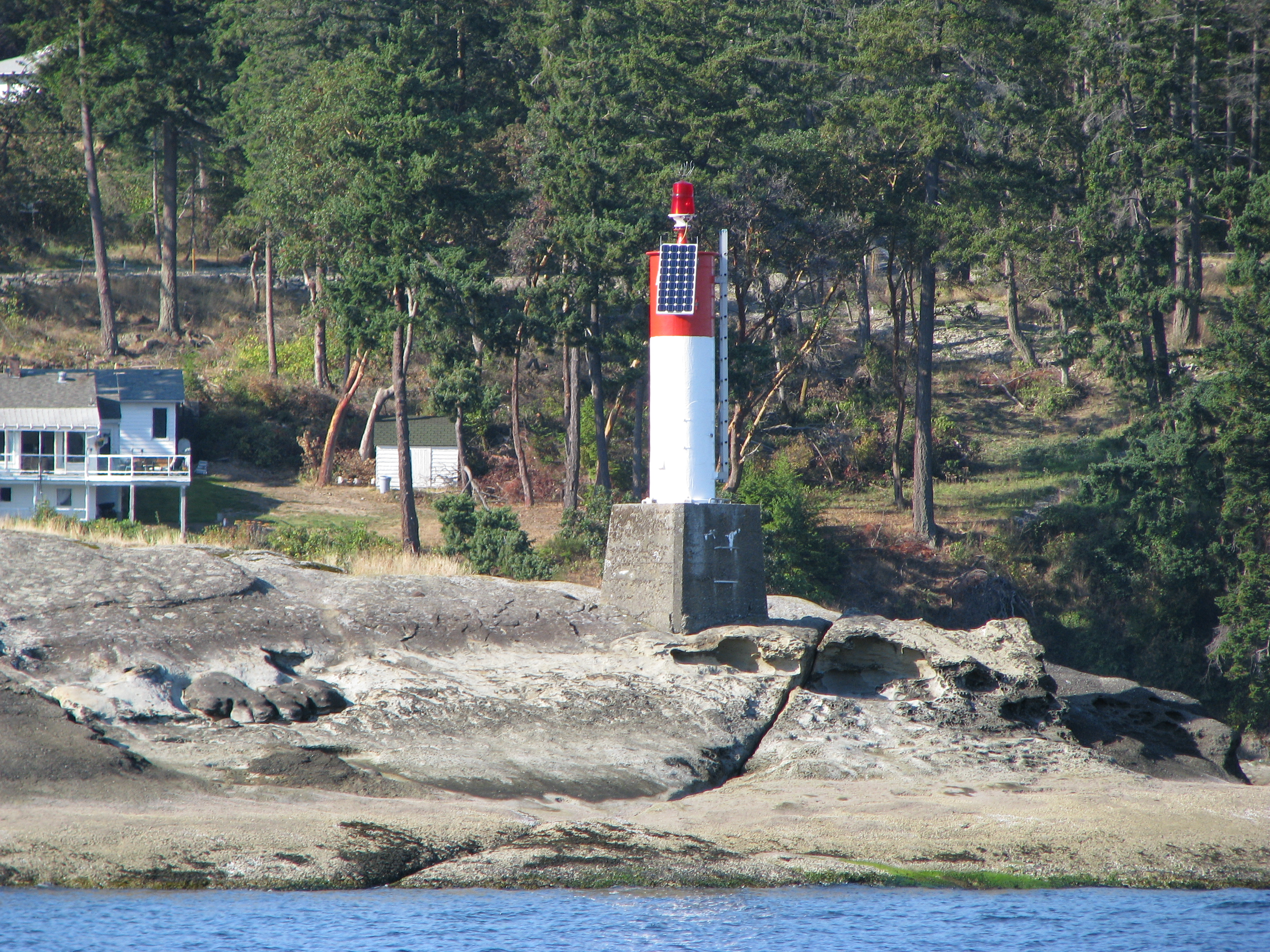
Jesse Island (with navigational marker).

The bay is framed to the west by Vancouver Island and to the south-east by Saysutshun (formerly Newcastle Island), a provincial marine park with a long history of mining, quarrying, herring salteries, and tourism. Jesse Island (9 acres or 3.6 hectares) and the smaller Brandon Islands are located near the northern shore of the bay. Both islands, though quite small, have varied histories; Brandon Island being notable for a history of Japanese fish canneries and salteries. In 1853 both islands were named after sailors on HMS Virago. Snake Island is a located just outside the mouth of the bay.

The "Departure Bay" neighbourhood surrounds most of the bay; though the north-eastern shoreline is referred to as Stephenson Point, named after Chief Constable Donald Stephenson. The BC Ferry terminal (itself referred to simply as "Departure Bay") is on the southern shore of the bay.

== History ==
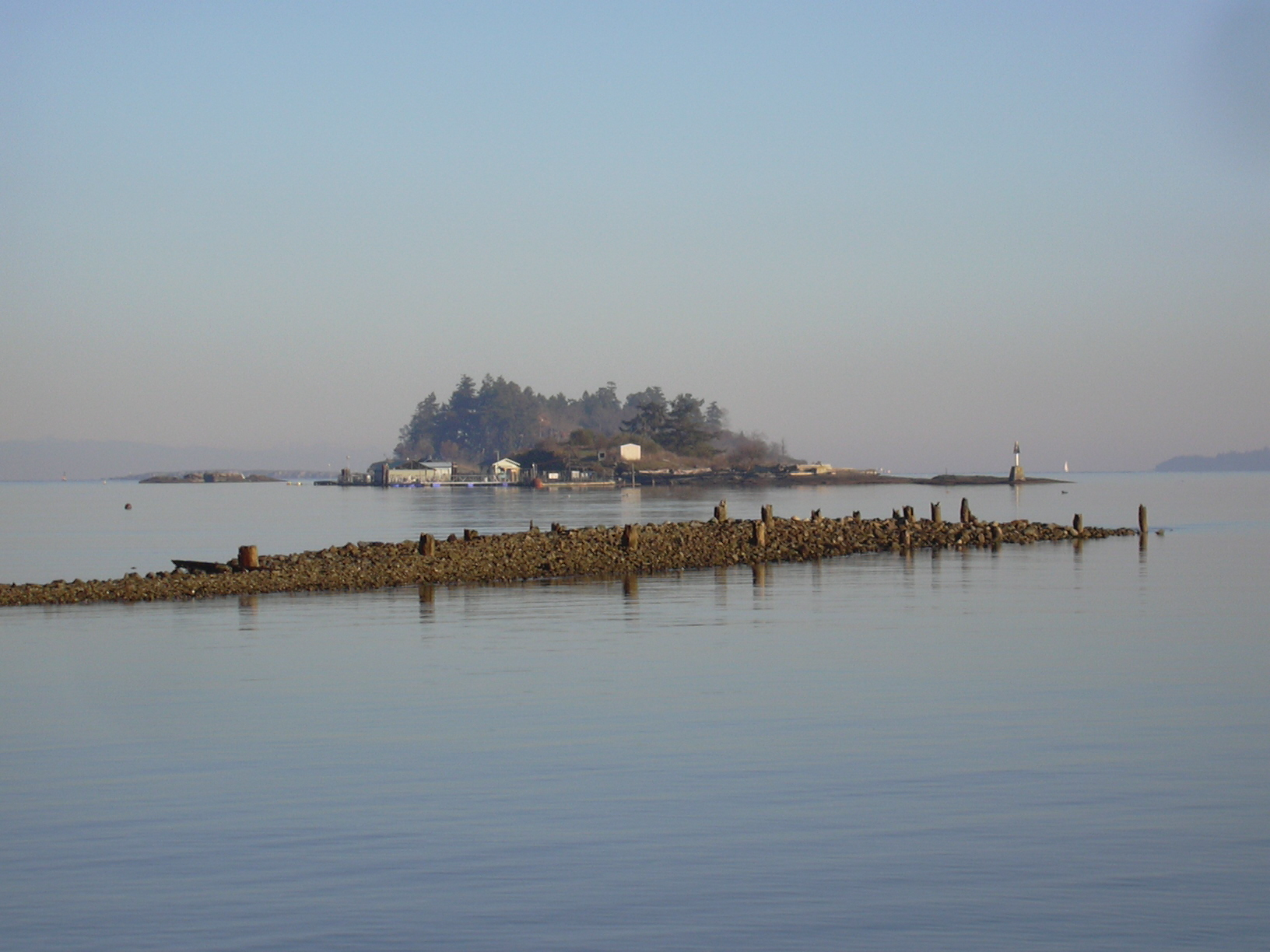
Brandon Islands and Jesse Island in Departure Bay with old wharf (c. 2003)

The earliest people in the region were the First Nations group known as the Snuneymuxw. It was reported in 1970 that evidence showed that the area had been inhabited for at least the whole of the last 2000 years relatively consistently.

The area was first explored by the Spanish between the 1770s and 1790s. The whole area, including Northumberland Channel, Nanaimo Harbour, and Departure Bay were named "Bocas de Winthuysen" by a Spanish naval officer, Francisco de Eliza, in 1791. The area was nonetheless referred to by the local native population as "Stil'ilup". The bay and surrounding area received an approximation of its present English moniker in approximately 1852: "Departure Harbour;" responsible for the naming were representatives of the Hudson's Bay Company. Later, in approximately 1855, maps were published showing the modern "Departure Bay."

In approximately 1861, the first known settlers of European origin made Departure Bay their home; they were William Joseph Hughes, Samuel Harris, and John and Barbara Christie. To obtain land they used what was known as "pre-emption," a historical method the Crown used to quickly sell previously un-surveyed land. In the late 1860s, coal was discovered in the Wellington area, and Departure Bay became the terminus of the rail system shipping coal from the mines. Soon, supporting offices and wharves appeared in the area. Later, in the 1870s, coal was discovered closer to the bay itself, and the Vancouver Coal Company set up further operations in the area. As an example of the significance of this area and its commercial operations, the first phone in British Columbia was set up connecting a coal wharf in Departure Bay with the mining operations in nearby Wellington. During the development of Departure Bay, many mining companies were active in the area, including the Departure Bay Mining Company, the Harewood Coal Company, and the aforementioned Vancouver Coal Company. The Hudson's Bay Company also operated mines in the area. Early in the modern history of Departure Bay, in the decades after the first settlements in the 1860s, the area was relatively populous, due in-part to the surrounding mining operations. When the mining operations later ceased (moving further away to Extension), what was once a "booming little port" became "virtually uninhabited." Until as late as the 1940s, the area remained a relatively insignificant neighbour of Nanaimo.

=== Cilaire and black powder ===
Cilaire is a neighbourhood along Departure Bay that was built in the 1960s as part of Mayor Frank Ney's Great National Land and Investment Corporation. It included 220 lots and magnificent views of Departure Bay. The subdivision was built at the site of a former dynamite plant.

By the late 1880s, with coal mining expanding, there was a significant demand for blasting powder. In 1890, the Hamilton Powder Company, which was founded in 1862 in Hamilton, Ontario, bought 156 acres of land in Northfield, four miles out of Nanaimo, to produce powder. The plant was called Northfield Powder Works.

In 1892, demand was still increasing so the Hamilton Powder Company built a second explosives (mainly nitroglycerine, black powder, dynamite, and stumping powder) manufacturing plant on 100 acres on the shore of Departure Bay. The production of black powder was relatively dangerous, and the death of employees was frequently the result of accidents. The road between the two plants was called Black Powder Road and dangerous goods were regularly transported by wagon along the road. In 1896, a wagon transporting nitroglycerine and other explosives along the blew up, killing the driver and horses. Accidents and loss of life became common place.

...on the morning of January 14, 1903, the deadliest explosion ever, in terms of loss of life, occurred when two massive explosions rocked the Departure Bay works. The ignition took place in the drying and weighing room where the gun cotton was stored. That concussion then set off the gelignite building 400 feet away, where a large quantity of high explosives was stored. Both buildings were wrecked and twelve men were killed. Their bodies were unidentifiable. ... [This] explosion at the Departure Bay powder works launched a piece of railway track 80 metres through the air with such force that it wrapped itself around a tree ... like a corkscrew.

— Carole Davidson

In 1910, the Hamilton Powder Company merged with six other companies to form Canadian Explosives Limited (CXL).

In the winter of 1913, another massive explosion occurred. On 14 January, the SS Oscar was loaded with dynamite, black powder, and coal bound for Howe Sound. The ship got as far as Entrance Island at the edge of Nanaimo Harbour when Captain Alexander McDonald realised the weather was too bad to proceed and there was a fire near the ship's boilers. The captain turned the ship around and headed for Douglas Island with the idea of beaching the vessel. He ran the ship aground at Execution Point (renamed Gallows Point in 1960) and he and his crew used a ladder to escape the ship and hide down a mineshaft. The resulting explosion destroyed the above ground workings of the mine and fractured the rock down to where the miners were working causing the mine to start flooding with water. The explosion was so great, windows all over Nanaimo were shattered, debris was propelled into town, and the post office clock stopped working at 1:55.

The citizens of Nanaimo demanded an inquiry on manufacturing, storage, and transportation of powder in Nanaimo. In the spring of 1913, CXL purchased James Island in Haro Strait with plans to move its operations out of Departure Bay. It was expected to take two years, but due to World War I, it took until May 1919 for the operations at Departure Bay to be decommissioned.

In 1927, Canadian Explosives Limited changed its name to Canadian Industries Limited (CIL). The name-sake for Cilaire comes from this.

=== Amalgamation ===
Between 1974 and 1975, the community of Departure Bay was amalgamated with the City of Nanaimo, based on a popular vote of only 52 percent in favour. In actuality, 61 percent of Departure Bay residents voted against the change; nonetheless, the greater vote from the populace of Nanaimo (which was to see its personal taxes lowered as a result—while Departure Bay's would be likewise increased) overcame the resistance.

== The Pacific Biological Station ==
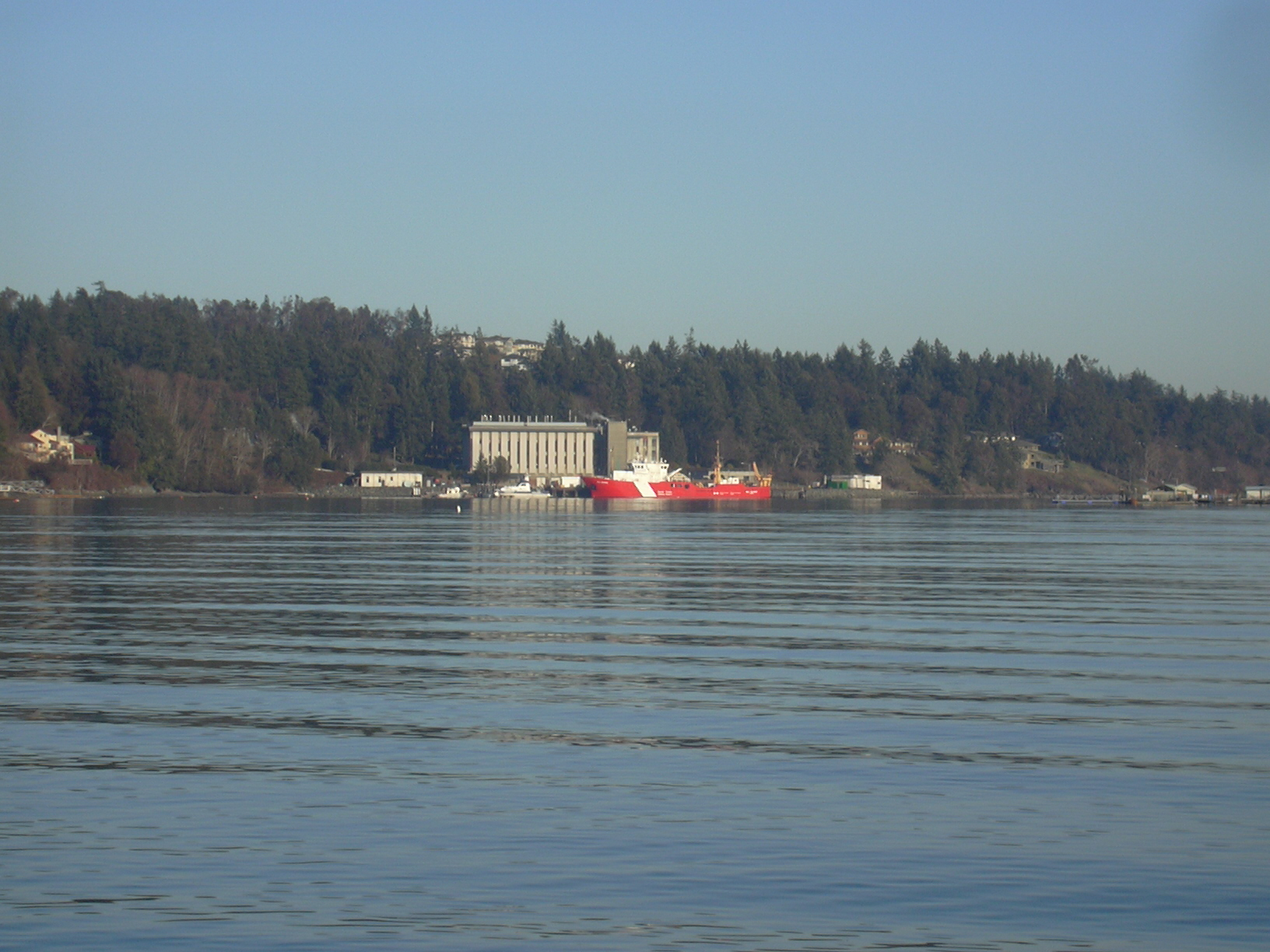
View of the Pacific Biological Station from Departure Bay Beach (c. 2003)

The Pacific Biological Station, located on Hammond Bay Road on the north shore of Departure Bay, was established in 1908, with the Rev. George William Taylor as its first director and sole employee. It is the oldest fisheries research centre on the Pacific coast. Operated by Fisheries and Oceans Canada, the station forms a network with eight other scientific facilities.

== Ferry service ==
The earliest ferries to use the port were local ships, travelling short routes between locations in the area, including Nanaimo, Departure Bay, and Newcastle Island. The first major ferry operation in the area was that of the Canadian Pacific Navigation Company, which maintained a route between Vancouver Island and the Lower Mainland between 1893 and 1901. In 1901, the Canadian Pacific Navigation Company was purchased by the Canadian Pacific Railway. The route stayed in operation as the sole service until the 1950s, when the Black Ball Ferries of Captain Alexander M. Peabody's Puget Sound Navigation Company began to service the area between Departure Bay and Horseshoe Bay with the ships Kahloke and Chinook. In the late 1950s, during a time of labour unrest in the industry, Premier Bennett started a governmental ferry service, then known as the British Columbia Toll Authority Ferry System. Departure Bay remained being served by the Black Ball Line until it was bought by the government ferry corporation on November 30 1961.

=== Departure Bay ferry terminal ===
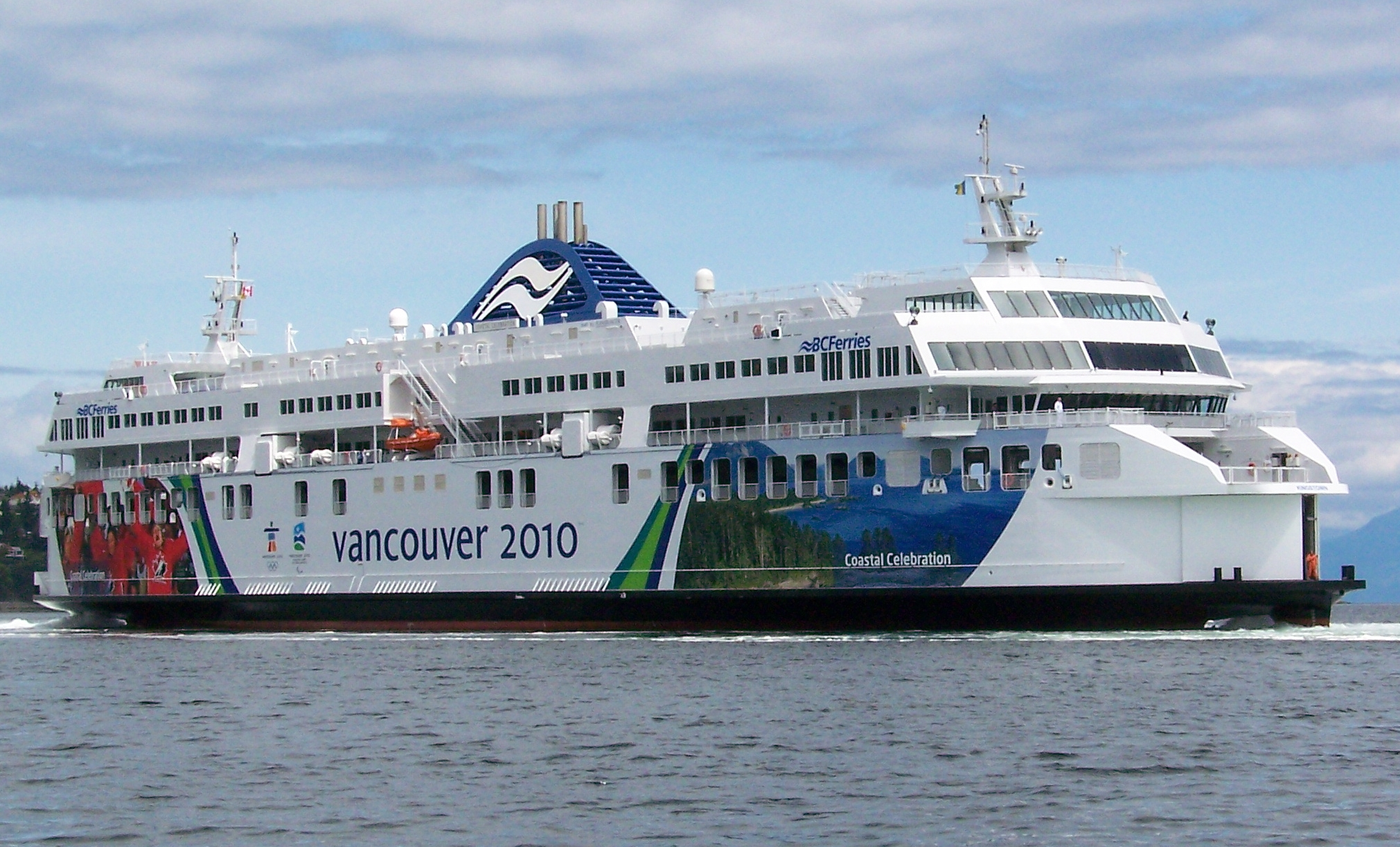
The BC Ferry Coastal Celebration arrives at Departure Bay on June 18, 2008, after completing a 40-day delivery voyage from Flensburg, Germany.

Since the earliest European settlements, the area has been a relatively busy port, for itself and the surrounding communities. The Trans-Canada Highway on Vancouver Island terminates in the north at Departure Bay, where a BC Ferry terminal is located. Ferries out of Departure Bay connect the Trans-Canada Highway to the Lower Mainland at Horseshoe Bay. As a major connector to Vancouver, Departure Bay is the most heavily used Island terminal north of Swartz Bay. Whenever necessary, Departure Bay can act as a backup dock for the ferry to Gabriola Island. Between 1990 and 1997, Departure Bay was also the Island terminus for the "Mid-Island Express" route to Tsawwassen, before being replaced by the newer Duke Point terminal.
