= Coastal Inspiration =

Canadian ship built in 2007

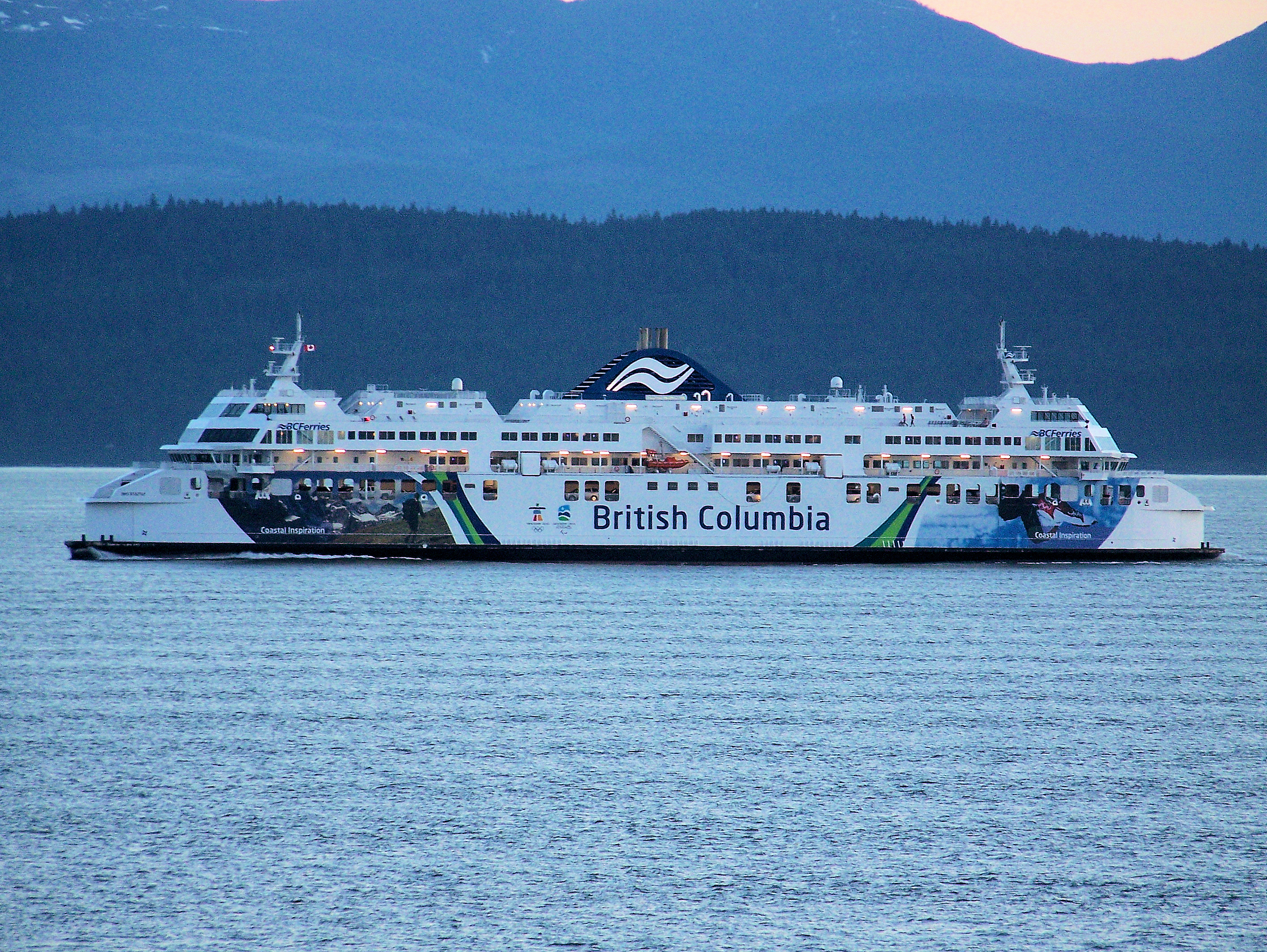
- Coastal Inspiration in the Strait of Georgia on June 25, 2008.

History

Canada
- Name: Coastal Inspiration
- Owner: BC Ferries
- Operator: BC Ferries
- Port of registry: Victoria, British Columbia
- Route: Duke Point – Tsawwassen
- Awarded: September 17, 2004
- Builder: Flensburger Schiffbau-Gesellschaft
- Yard number: 734
- Laid down: April 23, 2007
- Launched: August 31, 2007
- Completed: February 8, 2008
- In service: June 16, 2008
- Home port: Duke Point
- Identification: IMO number: 9332767; Official number: 832381; Callsign: CFN4970
- Status: In active service

General characteristics
- Class & type: Coastal-class ferry
- Tonnage: 1,770 DWT; 21,980 GT
- Displacement: 10,034 t (9,876 long tons; 11,061 short tons) (max)
- Length: 160 m (524 ft 11 in) oa; 154 m (505 ft 3 in) pp
- Beam: 28.2 m (92 ft 6 in)
- Propulsion: 4 × MaK 8M32C diesel engines
- Speed: 23 knots (43 km/h; 26 mph)
- Capacity: 1,604 passengers and crew; 310 vehicles

Coastal Inspiration is the second of three Coastal-class ships delivered to BC Ferries. Launched in 2007 and entering service in 2008, Coastal Inspiration operates on the Duke Point – Tsawwassen route in British Columbia. The vessel collided with the terminal at Duke Point on December 20, 2011, suffering significant damage that kept the ship in the dockyard until January 2012.

== Description ==
Coastal Inspiration is the second of three double-ended Coastal-class ferries. The ship has a 21,980 gross tonnage (GT) and is 1,770 tons deadweight (DWT) with a maximum displacement of 10,034 tonnes (9,876 long tons). The vessel is 160 metres (524 ft 11 in) long overall and 154 m (505 ft 3 in) between perpendiculars with a beam of 28.2 m (92 ft 6 in). The ship is powered by four MaK 8M32C diesel engines driving two shafts rated at 21,444 horsepower (15,991 kW). This gives the ship a maximum speed of 23 knots (43 km/h; 26 mph). (Note: The Miramar Ship Index gives the vessel's speed as 21 knots (39 km/h; 24 mph).) The ferry has capacity for 1,304 crew and passengers along with 310 vehicles that meet the AEU equivalent. (Note: The AEU equivalent is based on a standard vehicle measure of 6.1 m × 2.6 m (20 ft 0 in × 8 ft 6 in).) Coastal Inspiration is equipped with a variety amenities including coffee shops and lounges.

== Service history ==
On September 17, 2004, BC Ferries awarded a contract to Flensburger Schiffbau-Gesellschaft of Flensburg, Germany to build three double-ended ferries. The second keel was laid down on April 23, 2007, with the yard number 734. The ferry was launched on August 31, 2007, and named Coastal Inspiration in 2006. The ferry was completed on February 8, 2008. The vessel departed Flensburg on February 9, 2008, transited the Panama Canal on March 7 and arrived in Nanaimo, British Columbia, at Departure Bay on March 25.

Coastal Inspiration began regular service on June 16, 2008, on the Duke Point – Tsawwassen route. It had made unscheduled training runs during the week leading up to the date. On August 15, a fire broke out in one of the vehicles on the main car deck aboard the ferry after departing Tsawwassen. Roughly ten kilometres (6.2 mi) away from the terminal, the ferry returned to Tsawwassen and disembarked the 562 passengers aboard until the fire was extinguished and Transport Canada had cleared the ferry for departure.

On December 20, 2011, Coastal Inspiration experienced a hard landing upon arrival at Duke Point terminal. The terminal berth sustained significant damage and the vessel's port side doors were also damaged. The terminal required extensive repairs and its closure rerouted all service through Departure Bay. Repairs to the ship were completed in January 2012, and the terminal reopened in May 2012. The cause of the crash was later determined to be crew error. On August 1, 2013, Coastal Inspiration and Spirit of Vancouver Island rescued three boaters whose craft had overturned near Tsawwassen terminal.
