= Duke Point ferry terminal =

Ferry terminal in British Columbia, Canada

Duke Point
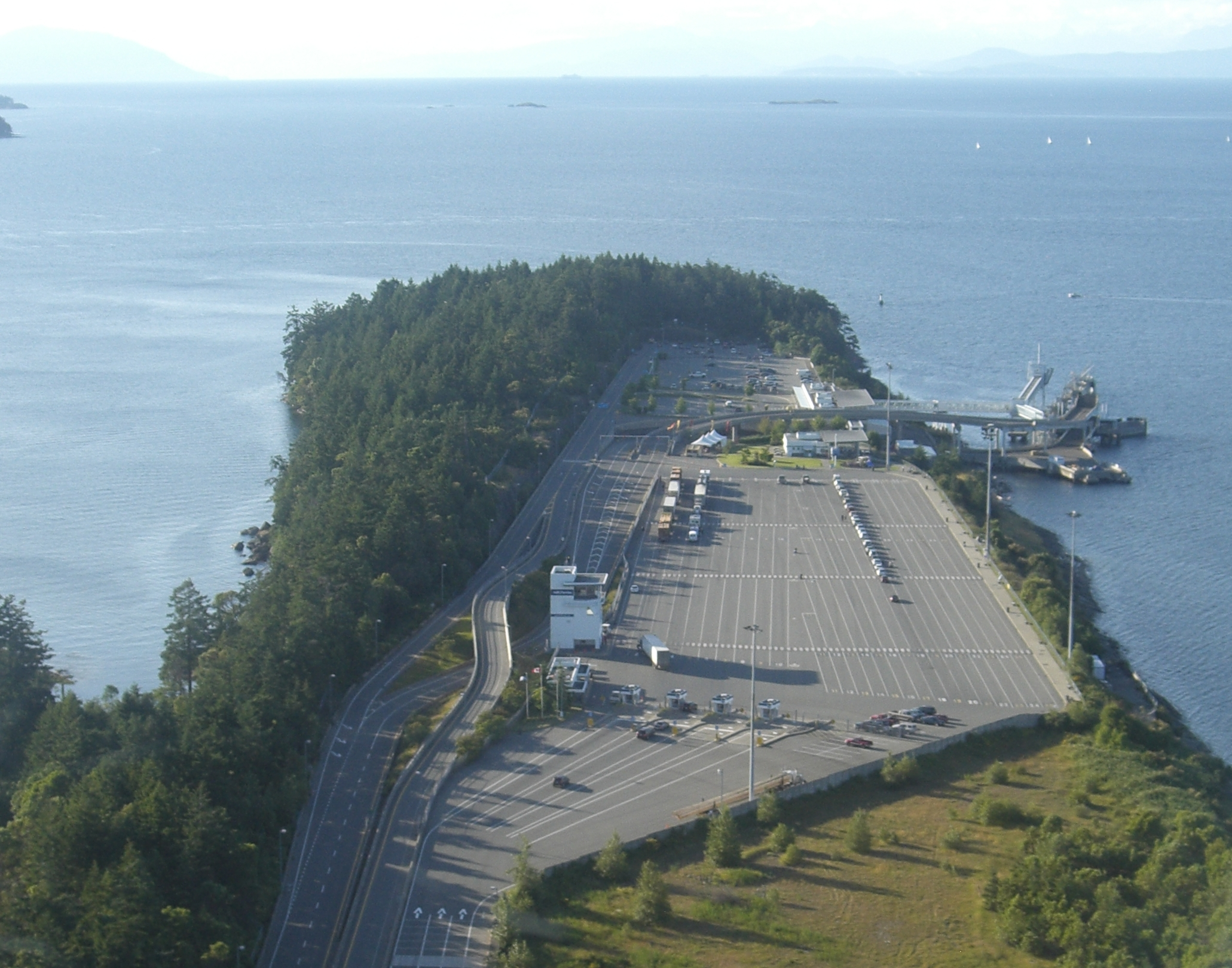
- Aerial view of the Duke Point ferry terminal

General information
- Location: 400 Duke Point Highway; Nanaimo, British Columbia; Canada
- Coordinates: 49.1620032°N 123.8941355°W
- System: Ferry terminal
- Owner: BC Ferries
- Operator: BC Ferries
- Line: Route 30–Tsawwassen

Construction
- Parking: 78 short-term spaces; 194 long-term spaces
- Accessible: yes

Other information
- Station code: DUKE
- Website: www.bcferries.com/travel-boarding/terminal-directions-parking-food/nanaimo-duke-point/DUK

History
- Opened: 9 June 1997

Passengers
- 2024: 1,054,400 (Note: Figures obtained for 2023 & 2024 from adding the passengers counted at Duke Point in each month of the calendar year. The figures under "Total Prev Year" are not used because those denote fiscal years instead of calendar years. The total passenger count at Duke Point for 2023 is 1 014 816.) ▲3.9%
Location

Duke Point is a major ferry terminal owned and operated by BC Ferries that provides ferry service across the Strait of Georgia to Tsawwassen. The ferry terminal is located at Duke Point in Nanaimo and is the only major terminal in the BC Ferries system without a public transit connection.

The terminal was built in 1997 for $42 million (equivalent to $67.88 million in 2022) to divert commercial vehicle traffic away from BC Ferries' other main Nanaimo terminal in the heart of the city, thus easing traffic jams through Nanaimo's city centre. It was officially opened on 9 June 1997 by Premier Glen Clark and saw its first sailings the following day. It has one berth, but was built to be easily expanded to have two additional berths in the future, as well as an additional 500 parking spaces, should demand require.

In 2013, 42 percent of passengers travelling from Nanaimo to the mainland went through Duke Point.

The ferry terminal marks the southern terminus of Highway 19, which connects the terminal to the Trans-Canada Highway just south of Nanaimo's city centre via the Duke Point Highway. The highway cost $50 million (equivalent to 80.81 million in 2022) to build.

== Incidents and accidents ==
On December 20, 2011, the Coastal Inspiration experienced a hard landing upon arrival at Duke Point terminal. The terminal berth sustained significant damage and the vessel's port side doors were also damaged. The terminal required extensive repairs, requiring a closure of over four months, with all service re-routed through Departure Bay, finally re-opening on May 1, 2012.

== See also ==
- Tsawwassen ferry terminal
- Departure Bay ferry terminal
