= Departure Bay ferry terminal =

Ferry terminal in British Columbia, Canada

Departure Bay
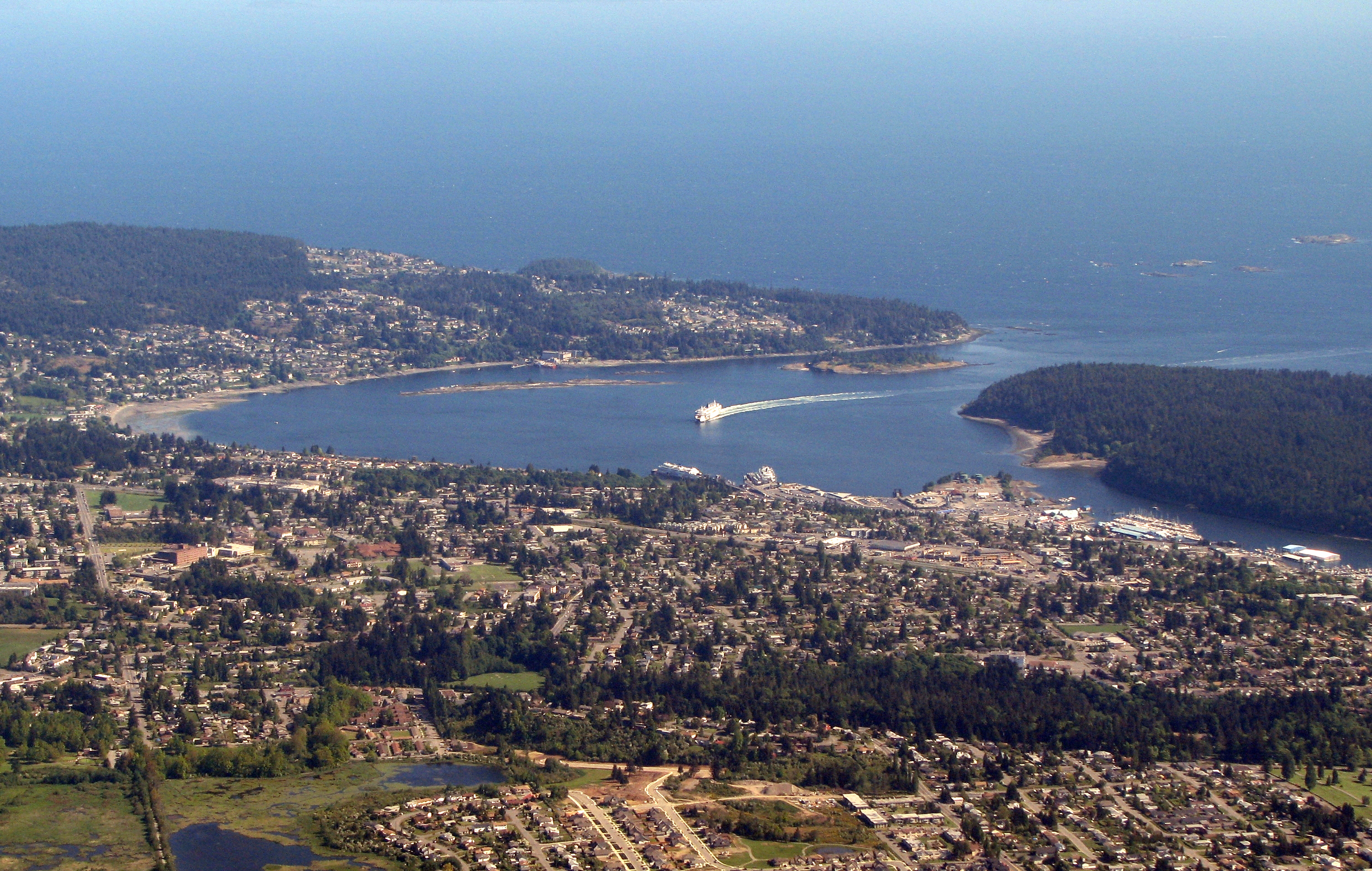
- Aerial view of Departure Bay, ferry terminal to the right.

General information
- Location: 680 Trans-Canada Highway; Nanaimo, British Columbia; Canada
- Coordinates: 49.1921928°N 123.9560779°W
- System: Ferry terminal
- Owner: BC Ferries
- Operator: BC Ferries
- Line: Route 2–Horseshoe Bay
- Bus routes: 4
- Connections: Nanaimo Regional: 20 Hammond Bay; 25 Ferry Shuttle; 50 Downtown/Woodgrove; 91 Intercity

Construction
- Parking: 177 short-term spaces 349 long-term spaces
- Accessible: yes

Other information
- Station code: DEP
- Website: www.bcferries.com/travel-boarding/terminal-directions-parking-food/nanaimo-departure-bay/NAN

History
- Opened: 1951
- Original company: Black Ball Line

Key dates
- 1961: Acquired by the Government of British Columbia

Passengers
- 2024: 1 551 280 (Note: Figures obtained for 2023 & 2024 from adding the passengers counted at Departure Bay in each month of the calendar year. The figures under "Total Prev Year" are not used because those denote fiscal years instead of calendar years. The total passenger count at Departure Bay for 2023 was 1 587 734.) ▼2.3%
Location

Departure Bay is a major ferry terminal in Nanaimo, British Columbia, owned and operated by BC Ferries that provides ferry service across the Strait of Georgia to Horseshoe Bay in West Vancouver. The terminal is located at the southern end of Departure Bay.

Unlike Nanaimo's other major ferry terminal, Duke Point, Departure Bay has public transit connections.

== History ==
Beginning in 1951, the Black Ball Line originally ran its ferry service from Departure Bay to Horseshoe Bay using the ferries Kahloke and Chinook. In November 1961, BC Ferries took over service by acquiring the Black Ball Line.

Prior to the opening of the Duke Point ferry terminal in 1997, Departure Bay had regular ferry service to Tsawwassen. This change occurred to alleviate traffic flow in Nanaimo.
