= Flensburger Schiffbau-Gesellschaft =

German shipbuilding company

Flensburger Schiffbau-Gesellschaft mbH & Co. KG
- Type: Private
- Industry: vehicle construction
- Genre: Shipbuilding
- Founded: 1872
- Headquarters: Flensburg, Germany
- Key people: Philipp Maracke (CEO)
- Products: RoRo ships RoPax ships Container ships Naval ships
- Website: www.fsg-ship.de

Flensburger Schiffbau-Gesellschaft is a German shipbuilding company located in Flensburg. The company trades as Flensburger and is commonly abbreviated FSG.

== History ==
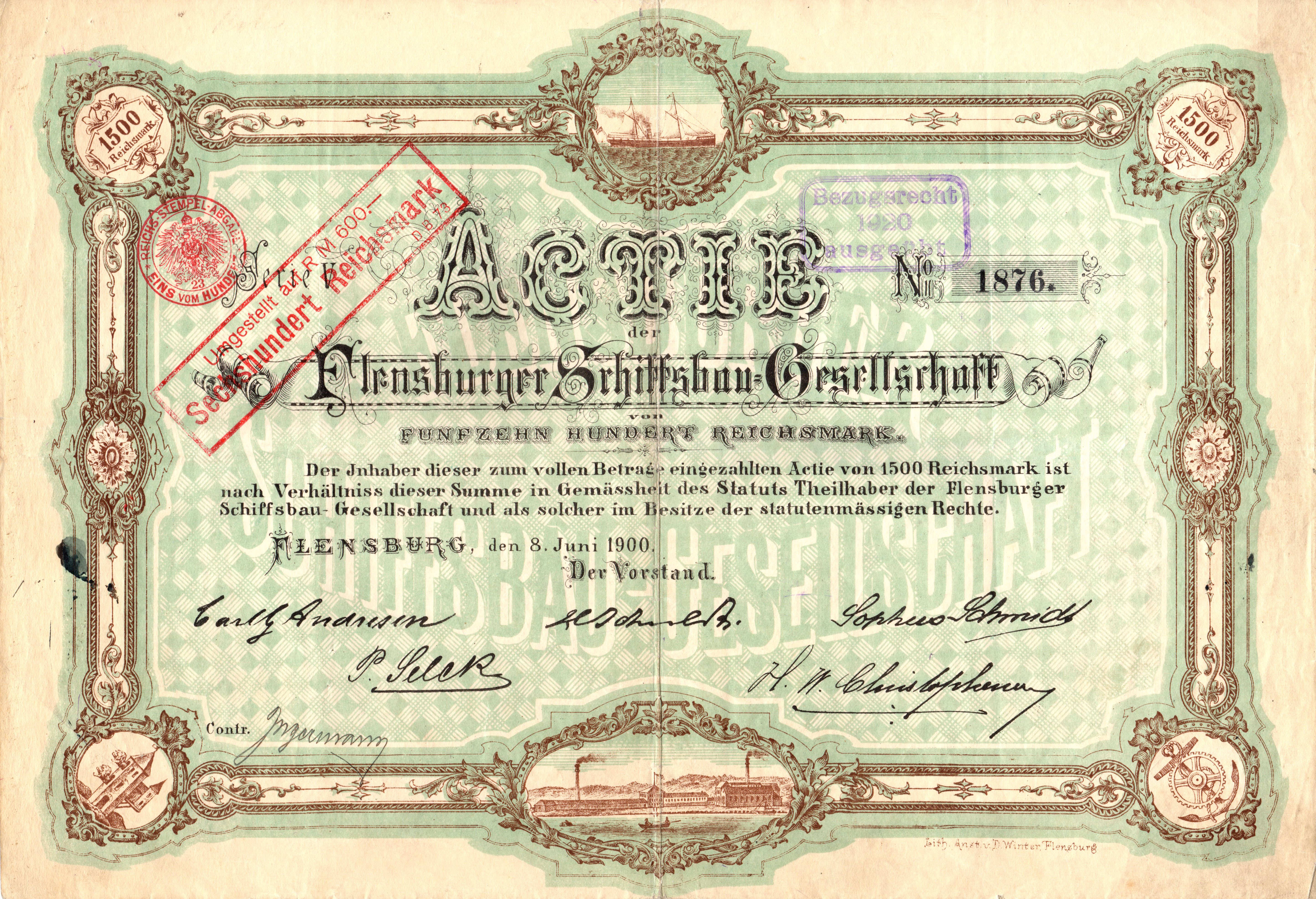
Share of the Flensburger Schiffsbau-Gesellschaft, issued 8 June 1900

Flensburger Schiffbau-Gesellschaft was founded in 1872 by a group of five local shipowners who previously had all their steamboats built in England as most German shipowners did in the 19th century.

The first ship, the iron tall ship Doris Brodersen, was delivered to one of the founding partners in 1875. The cargo steamer Septima was commissioned a year later.

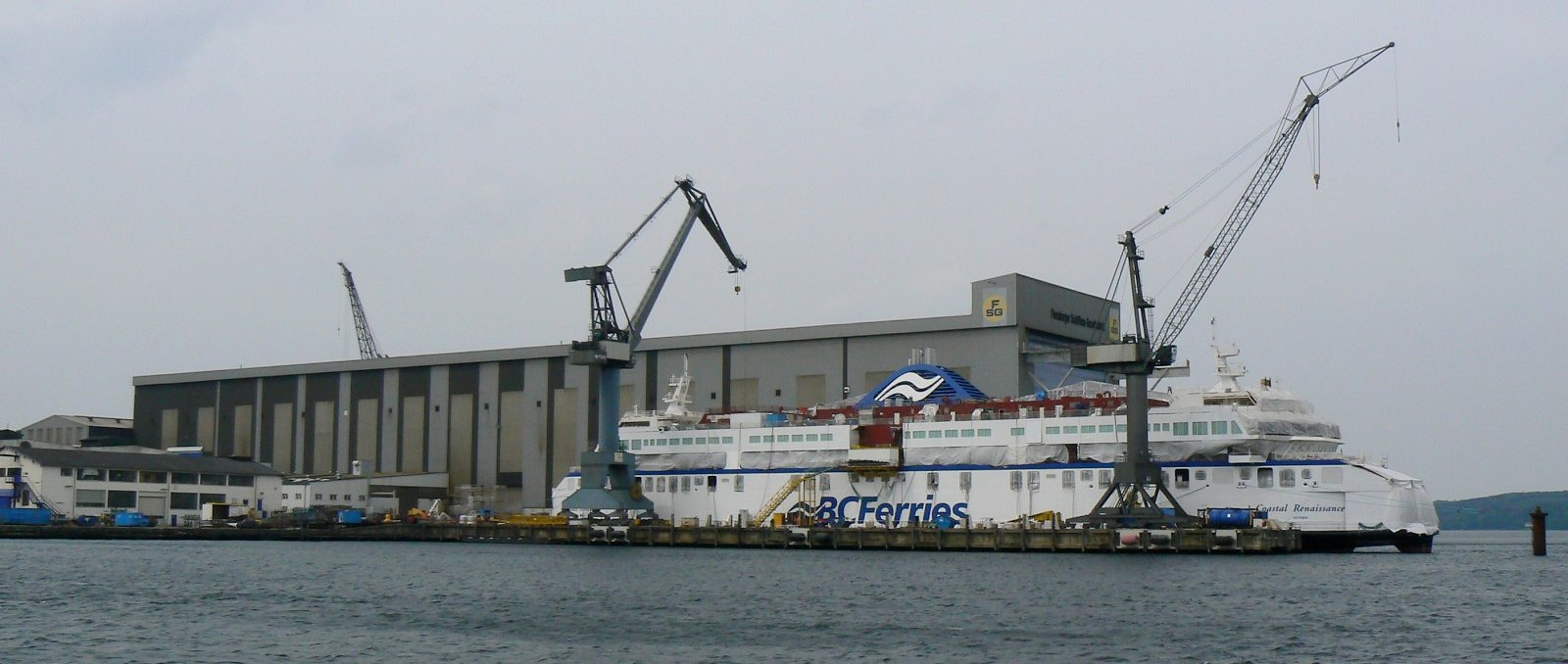
View of the FSG shipyard, 2007. The ship lying on pier is the Coastal Renaissance, built for BC Ferries

Since then Flensburger has delivered more than 700 units of different types of cargo steamers and motor vessels and has also built sailing ships, barges, floating dry docks, tankers, fishing vessels, passenger ships, naval ships and even submarines.

Flensburger was acquired by Egon Oldendorff in March 1990 and then sold to the management in December 2008.

In February 2019, Lars Windhorst's Sapinda Holding acquired a 76% stake in the company and saved it from potential bankruptcy after the shipyard ran into financial difficulties due to multiple delays in the construction of the W. B. Yeats. The full takeover of the shipyard was ultimately completed in August 2019 by the aforementioned holding company, which has since been renamed Tennor Holding B.V.

There was also a delay of several months in the subsequent construction of the Honfleur, which was due to be delivered in 2019. As a result of the delays, in February 2020 Flensburger Schiffbau-Gesellschaft and the Australian TT-Line Company terminated the contract concluded in 2018 for the construction of two ferries (construction numbers 778 and 779) with planned delivery in 2021.

Since 1 September 2020, the shipyard is owned by the Tennor Group, controlled by Lars Windhorst. Subsequently, in August 2021 FSG acquired the neighboring Nobiskrug superyacht shipyard, located in Rendsburg.

In December 2024 the company filed for bankruptcy.

== Ships built by Flensburger (selection) ==
=== Historic ships ===
- Doris Brodersen, first ship built, a tall ship delivered in 1875
- Septima, first steamer delivered 1876
- Deutschland and Bremen, two merchant submarines delivered 1916
- Alrich, cargo ship seized by the Brazilian Navy during World War I and renamed to Parnahyba.
- twenty-eight Type VII U-boats: U-351 - U-370 and U-1301 - U-1308.

=== Contemporary ships ===
Civil transport:

- UND Adriyatik, a ro-ro ship delivered 2001 to U.N Ro-Ro İşletmeleri A.Ş, a Turkish-based shipping company.
- Three Coastal class ferries for BC Ferries, British Columbia, Canada.
- Northern Expedition for the BC Ferries route from Port Hardy to Prince Rupert
- Eight ConRo220 freight ferries for Cobelfret.
- Six RoRo3900 freight ferries for DFDS.
- Eight RoRo3750 freight ferries for Ulosoy Sealines.
- Two ConRo220 freight ferries for Bore Ltd/Rettig Group Ltd.
- Four RoRo2200 freight ferries for Seatruck Ferries.
- MV Loch Seaforth, a ro-ro ship delivered in 2014 to Caledonian MacBrayne, a Scottish ferry company.
- MV W.B. Yeats, a ro-ro ship delivered in 2018 to Irish Ferries
- MV Rusadir, a ro-ro ship initially ordered by Brittany Ferries, order cancelled in 2020 and vessel completed by Fosen Yard and delivered to Baleària in 2023

Naval ships:

- Three Oste class (Type 423) electronic surveillance ships for the German Navy.
- Two Elbe class (Type 404) replenishment ships for the German Navy.
- Two Berlin class (Type 702) replenishment ships for the German Navy.
- Four of six Point class ro-ro strategic transports for the UK Ministry of Defence.

Autognom

== Gallery ==
A gallery of vessels built by Flensburger.

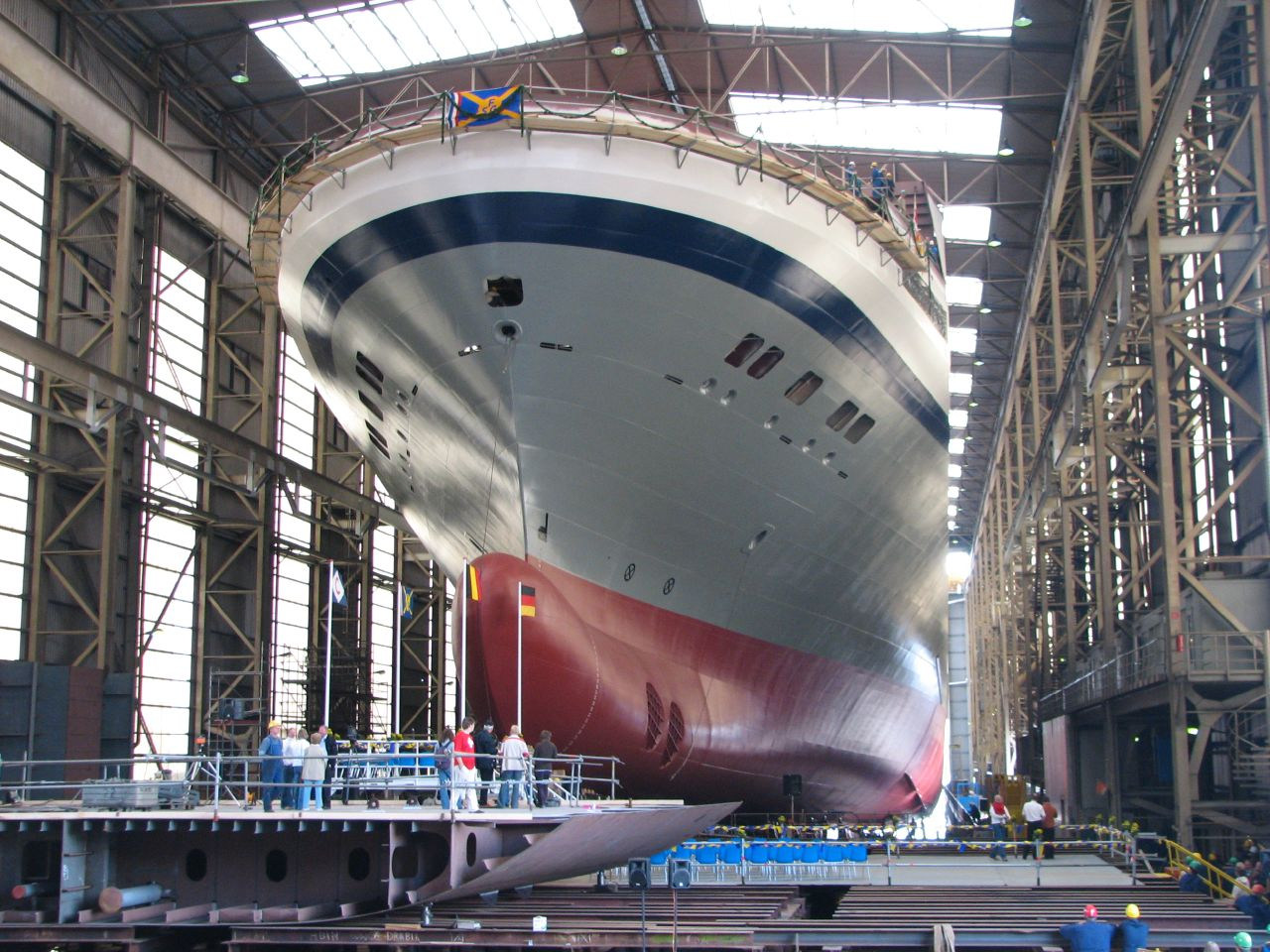
Pauline, a ro-ro vessel for Cobelfret Ferries

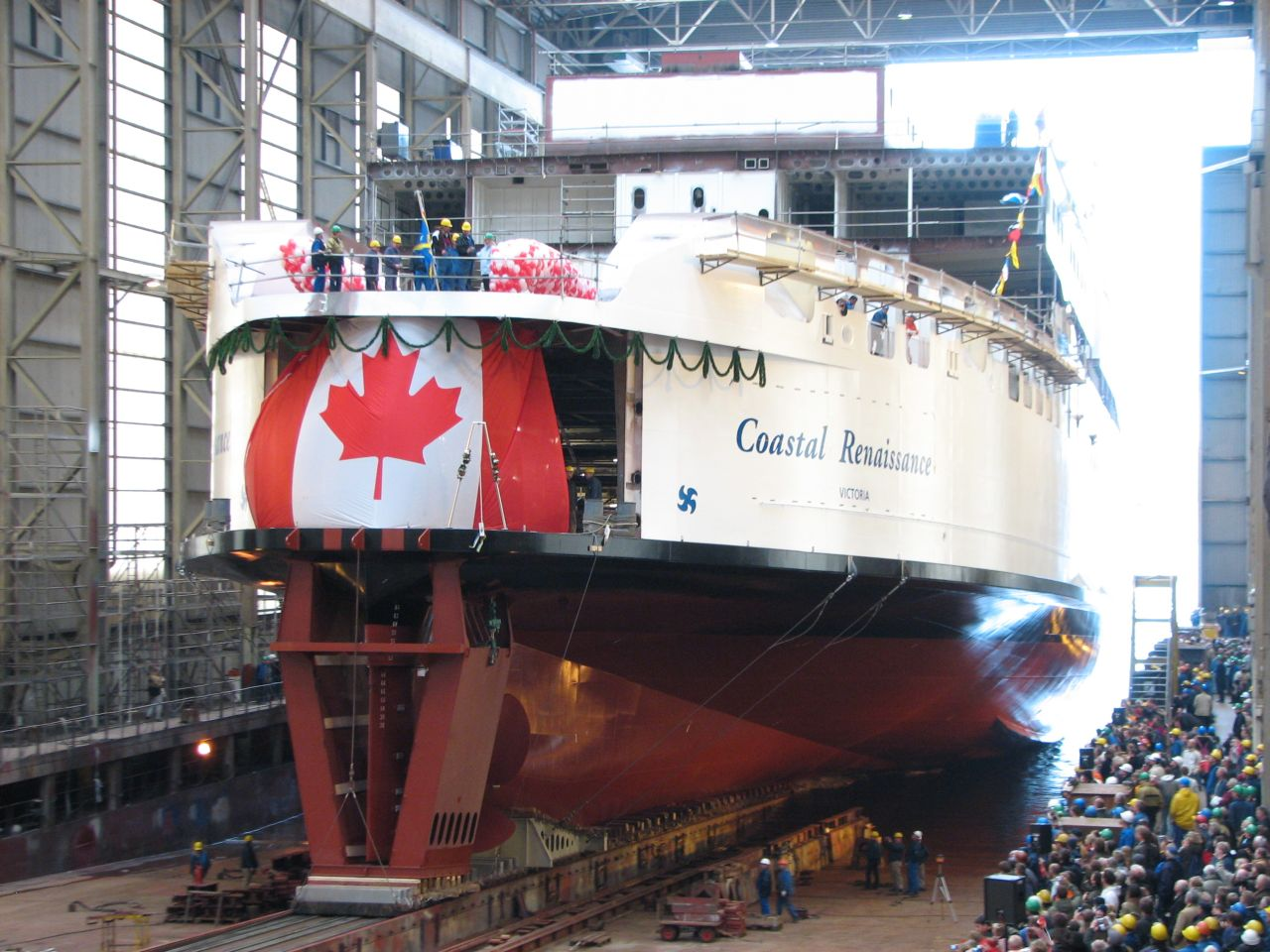
Launching of Coastal Renaissance

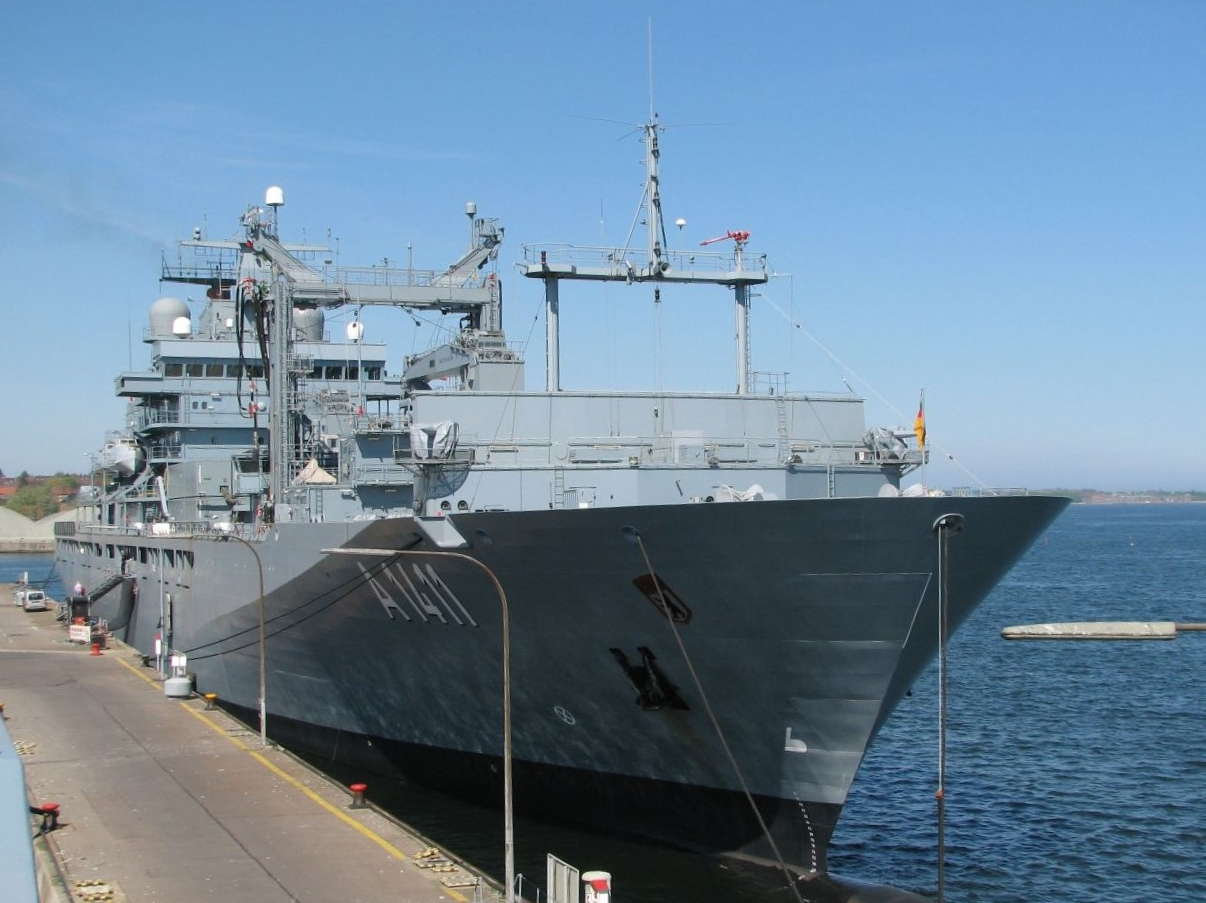
Replenishment ship Berlin of the German Navy

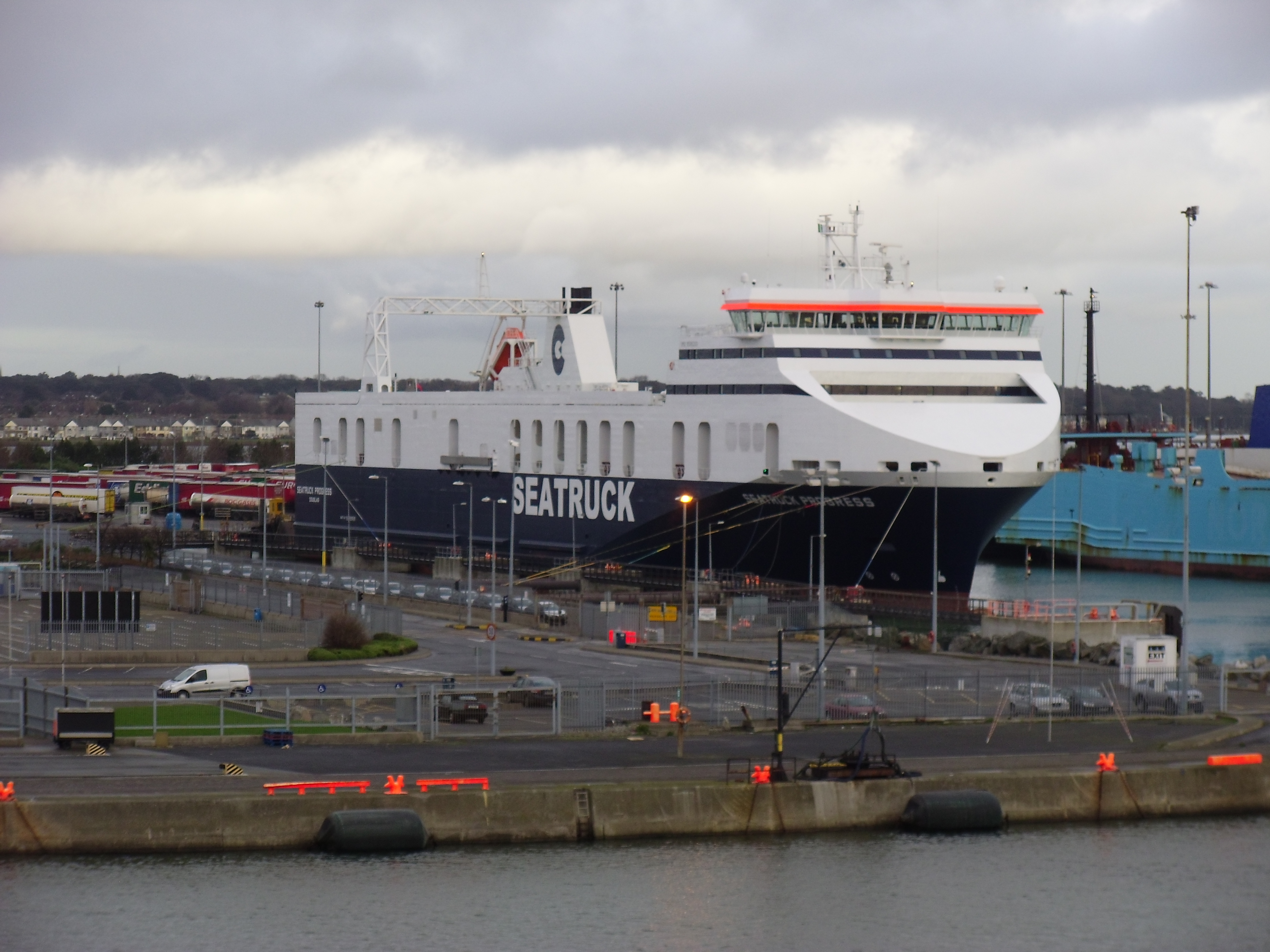
Seatruck Progress, a RoRo2200 ferry
