= Duke Point, British Columbia =

Industrial park in British Columbia

Coordinates: 49.161389°N 123.891792°W

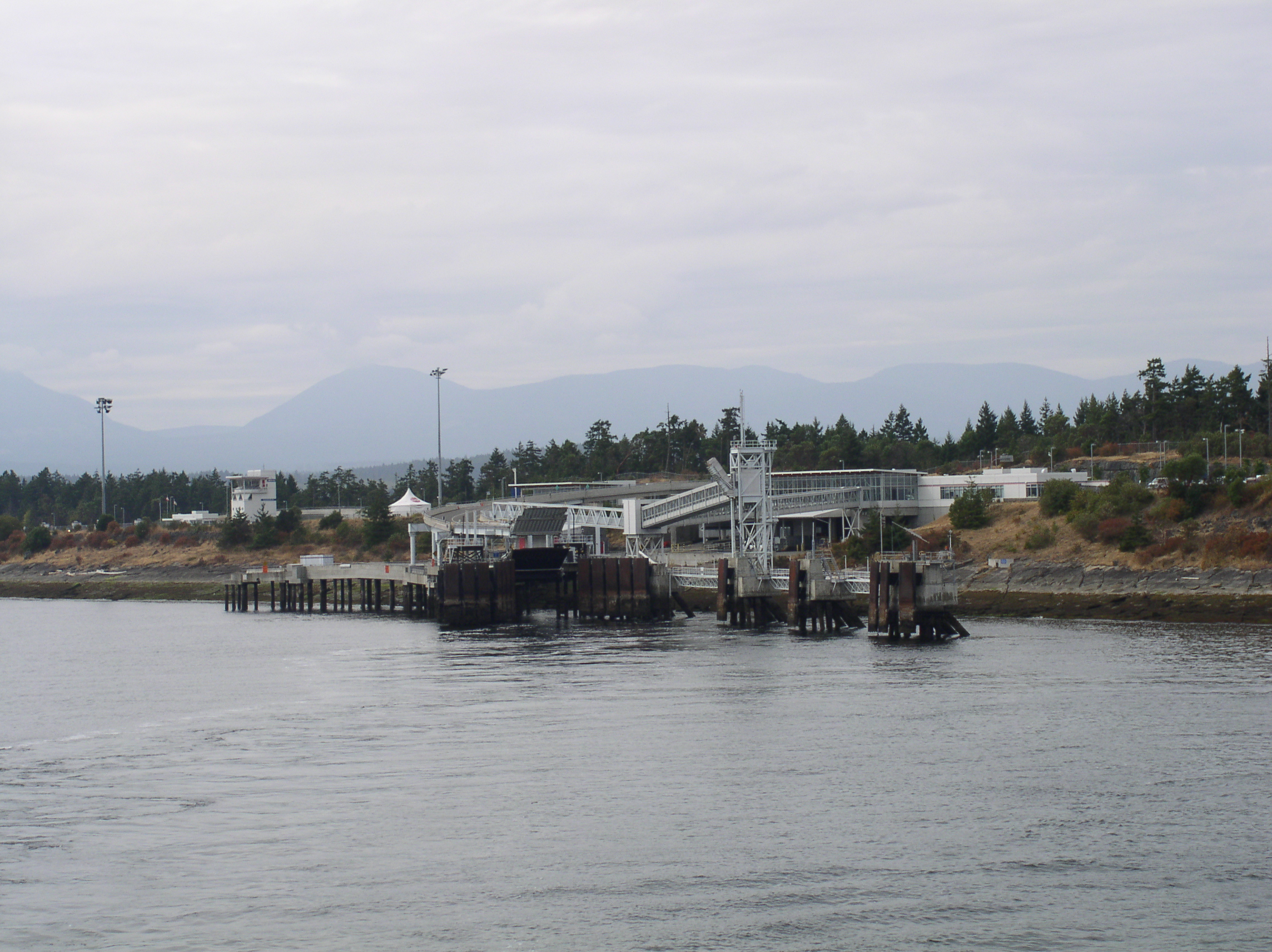
Duke Point ferry terminal

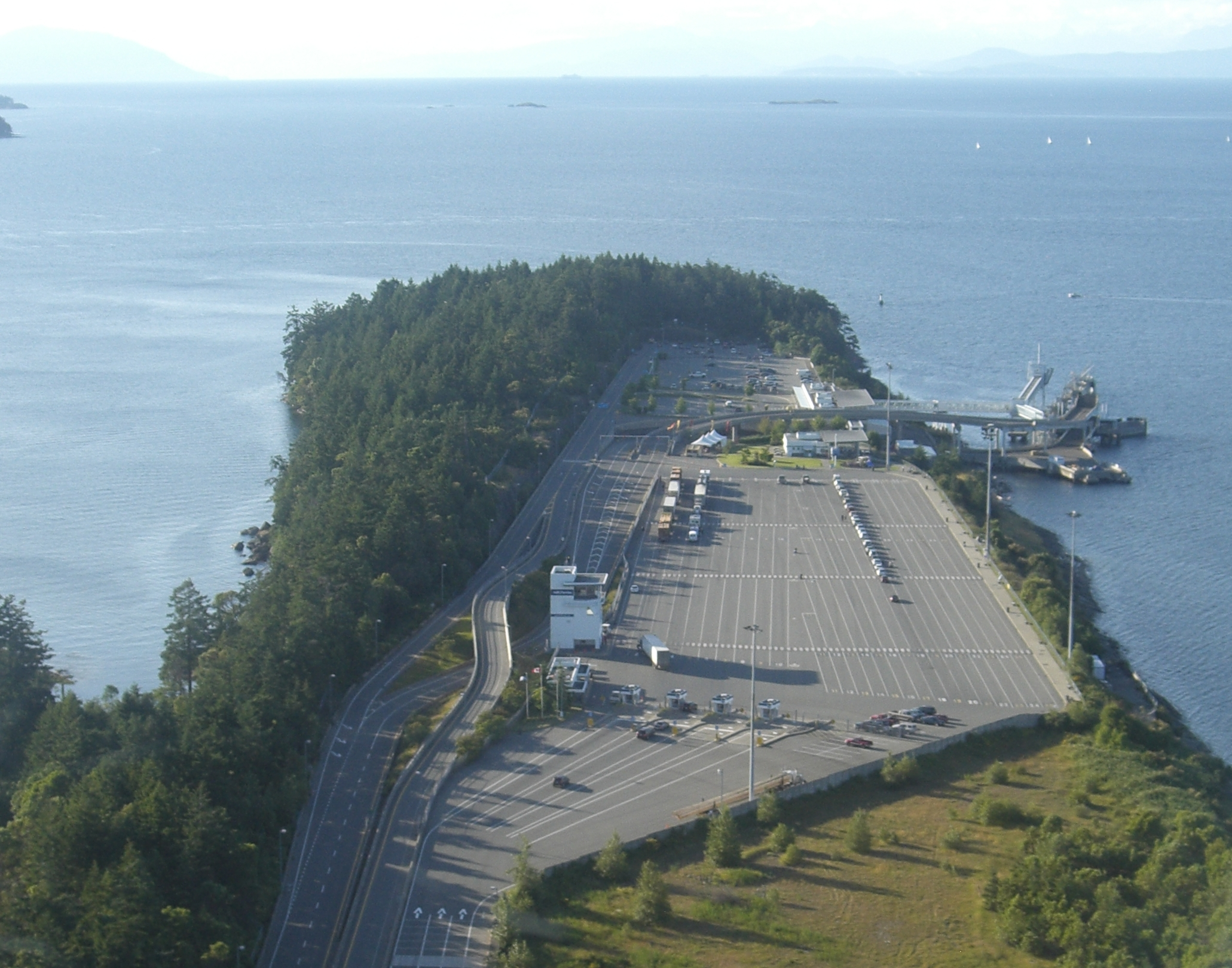
Aerial view of the Duke Point ferry terminal

Duke Point is a geographical location in the extreme southeastern part of the city of Nanaimo in British Columbia. It is located on a thin peninsula to the east of the Nanaimo River estuary, just across the Northumberland Channel from Gabriola Island.

An industrial park is located at Duke Point, which includes one sawmill. The Duke Point ferry terminal is also located here, but there are no public transit connections.

== History ==
Before Duke Point became an industrial park, there were searches for archaeological sites on the peninsula. Several sites were found and these examinations found that the settlements on Duke Point belonged to the Coast Salish and were around 4,000 years old. The site also revealed that Duke Point was used as a seasonal ground for the Coast Salish.

In 1980, the BC Development Corporation bought the Jack Point land from private owners, and the Duke Point land from then MacMillan Bloedel, and then levelled and serviced the lands to create the industrial park, three sawmill sites, and a 2 berth shipping terminal (only one berth was built). The 350 acre Duke Point Industrial Park was built by the BC Development Corporation from 1980 to 1983, under the Federal/Provincial Industrial Subsidiary Agreement ("TIDSA"). The Duke Point Ferry Terminal was built on Provincial land outside the TIDSA lands, and sits on land that was originally called "Jack Point", but which was amalgamated with the Duke Point Land. Originally, the Jack Point land was separated from the Duke Point land by Canoe Pass, that connected the Northumberland Channel to the waters of the Nanaimo Estuary.

== See also ==
- Nanaimo Harbour
