= MV Spirit of British Columbia =

Ship built in 1993

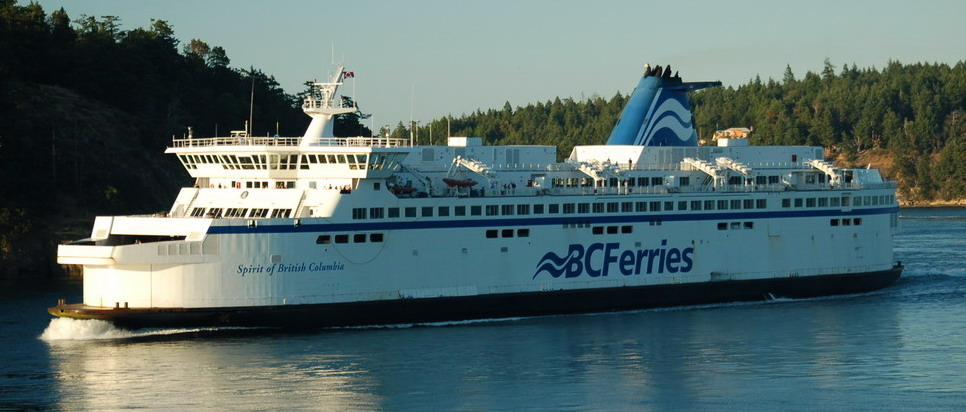
- Spirit of British Columbia

History

Canada
- Name: Spirit of British Columbia
- Namesake: British Columbia
- Owner: British Columbia Ferry Services Inc.
- Operator: British Columbia Ferry Services Inc.
- Port of registry: Victoria, British Columbia
- Route: Tsawwassen–Swartz Bay
- Builder: Allied Shipbuilders, North Vancouver, Integrated Ferry, Esquimalt
- Yard number: 559
- Launched: 17 April 1992
- Completed: February 1993
- In service: 1993
- Refit: 2018
- Home port: Tsawwassen
- Identification: IMO number: 9015668; MMSI number: 316001268; Official number: 815277; Call sign: VOSM
- Status: Active

General characteristics
- Class & type: S-class ferry
- Tonnage: 18,747 GT
- Displacement: 11,642 t (11,458 long tons)
- Length: 167.5 m (549 ft 6 in) oa; 156.0 m (511 ft 10 in) pp
- Beam: 32.9 m (107 ft 11 in)
- Decks: 7
- Deck clearance: 4.42 m (14 ft 6 in) for lower car decks
- Installed power: 4 × Wärtsilä 8L34DF engines; 21,394 hp (15,954 kW)
- Propulsion: 2 controllable pitch propellers and 2 bow thrusters
- Speed: 20.6 knots (38.2 km/h; 23.7 mph)
- Capacity: 2,100 passengers & crew; 358 cars

MV Spirit of British Columbia is an S-class ferry, part of the BC Ferries fleet active along the British Columbia coast. It and Spirit of Vancouver Island represent the two largest ships in the fleet. The ship was completed in 1993 and serves the Tsawwassen–Swartz Bay route. In 2018, it underwent a mid-life refit that included conversion to a dual-fuel system that allows it to use either marine diesel oil or liquefied natural gas.

== Description ==
Spirit of British Columbia is an S-class ferry that measures 167.5 m (549 ft 6 in) long overall and 156.0 m (511 ft 10 in) between perpendiculars with a beam of 32.9 m (107 ft 11 in). The vessel has a 18,747 gross tonnage (GT), 2,925 tons deadweight (DWT) and a displacement of 11,642 tonnes (11,458 long tons). The gross tonnage later increased to 21,958 as of 2018.

The ferry was initially powered by four MAN 6L40/54 diesel engines driving two shafts creating 21,394 horsepower (15,954 kW). Spirit of British Columbia has a maximum speed of 20.6 knots (38.2 km/h; 23.7 mph). In 2018, the ferry began a mid-life refit that involved changing the propulsion system to a dual-fuel system comprising four Wärtsilä 34DF dual-fuel engines which allows the ship to use either marine diesel oil or liquefied natural gas to power the ship. Further changes include navigation and propulsion equipment, steering and evacuation systems, lighting and air conditioning. Passenger areas were upgraded including the lounges, bathrooms and retail areas.

The ferry has a capacity for 2,100 passengers and crew and 358 automobiles. The ferry is equipped with lounges and cafes.

== Service history ==
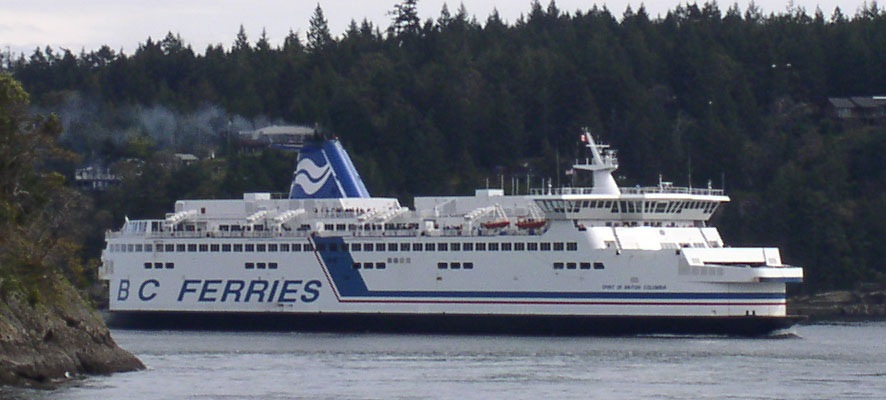
Spirit of British Columbia in April 2003

Spirit of British Columbia was constructed in two parts in British Columbia. The ferry's forepart was built by Allied Shipbuilders of North Vancouver with the yard number 254. The rest of the ship was constructed by Integrated Ferry of Esquimalt, British Columbia with the yard number 559. The two sections were joined and the vessel was launched on 17 April 1992 and completed in February 1993. Owned and operated by British Columbia Ferry Services Inc. along the British Columbia Coast, Spirit of British Columbia was assigned to the Tsawwassen–Swartz Bay route.

From 2005 to 2006, the S-class ferries underwent major refits.

In late 2017, Spirit of British Columbia departed for Poland to undergo its mid-life refit. The refit included conversion to dual-fuel propulsion. The $140 million refit was completed by Remontowa Ship Repair Yard in Gdańsk. The ferry returned to service in June 2018.
