= British Columbia Highway 17A =

Highway in British Columbia

Highway 17A
- Highway 17A highlighted in red

Route information
- Maintained by the Ministry of Transportation and Infrastructure
- Length: 6.29 km (3.91 mi)
- Existed: 2012–present

Major junctions
- North end: Highway 99 in Delta
- South end: Highway 17 in Delta

Location
- Country: Canada
- Province: British Columbia

Highway system
- British Columbia provincial highways
| ← Highway 17 | → Highway 18 |

Highway 17A is a 6 km (3.7 mi) long route connecting Highway 99 and Highway 17; this route was originally numbered Highway 17 between these two points but the numbering was altered once the South Fraser Perimeter Road neared completion (on December 1, 2012).

== Route description ==
Beginning at its interchange with Highway 17, Highway 17A proceeds due north as a 4-lane expressway. 4 km (2.5 mi) after the dual-interchanges with Highway 17 and Deltaport Way, the expressway reaches a junction with Ladner Trunk Road at Ladner. Highway 17 continues another 2 km (1 1/4 mi) to its terminus at Highway 99, near the southern approach to the George Massey Tunnel. The roadway continues as 62B Street which becomes River Road, a secondary connector from South Delta to North Delta which passes Tilbury Industrial Park. Trucks are no longer permitted to travel on Highway 17A except for local delivery, as the newer Highway 17 expressway was partly intended to keep trucks out of Ladner and provide a traffic-light free connection between Highway 99 and Deltaport, which is expecting huge expansion in the near future.

== Exit list ==
The entire route is in Delta, Metro Vancouver Regional District.

| km | mi | Destinations | Notes |
|---|---|---|---|
| 0.00 | 0.00 | Highway 17 west – Tsawwassen, Ferries | Southbound access to Highway 17 west and northbound access from Highway 17 east; Highway 17 exit 7 |
| 0.68 | 0.42 | Deltaport Way (Highway 901:3191 west) – Roberts Bank | Interchange; southbound exit and northbound entrance |
| 4.11 | 2.55 | Ladner Trunk Road | Ladner; at-grade signalized intersection; former Highway 10 east |
| 6.29 | 3.91 | Highway 99 / River Road – Vancouver, USA border | Interchange; Highway 99 exit 28; continues as River Road |
1.000 mi = 1.609 km; 1.000 km = 0.621 mi: Incomplete access

== Former Portion (Vancouver Island) ==
Highway 17A
- Location: Saanich, Centra Saanich, North Saanich
- Length: 27 km (17 mi)
- Existed: 1962–1998

Highway 17A, known locally as West Saanich Road, was an alternate route through the Saanich Peninsula. While the four-lane Highway 17 takes a path along the eastern half of the peninsula, Highway 17A, which had only two lanes, took the western side. Highway 17A was used as the primary access to the famous Butchart Gardens, as well as the ferry across the Saanich Inlet, used to bypass the Malahat Drive. The highway was first designated 17A in 1962, and lost its designation on 15 May 1998 after its component routes were devolved. Highway 17A's total length was 27 km (17 mi).

=== Route description ===
Highway 17A started off in the south in Saanich by branching off from Highway 17 at the Royal Oak Drive interchange. Highway 17A then turned on to the road officially named West Saanich Road at its intersection with Royal Oak Drive, and followed a winding path through Saanich. After 9 km (6 mi) through Saanich, the Highway entered the Central Saanich district.

1 km (about ½ mi) north of the boundary between Saanich and Central Saanich, Highway 17A entered the community of Brentwood Bay, which is where the Saanich Inlet Ferry and the Butchart Gardens are located. Highway 17A goes through Brentwood Bay for 2 km (1¼ mi), then entered North Saanich for another 4 km (2½ mi) north as it began to hug the eastern shore of the Saanich Inlet. Highway 17A winded through North Saanich for 9 km (6 mi) before meeting an intersection with Wain Road, at which point the Highway turned east. Highway 17A followed Wain Road for 2 km (1¼ mi) before terminating at Highway 17's Wain Road interchange, just south of Swartz Bay.

West Saanich Road itself did not follow the 17A route after Wain Rd. West Saanich continues northward, terminating at Land's End Road. Going west ultimately loops back to West Saanich Road, while heading eastward on Land's End leads to the Swartz Bay Ferry Terminal.

=== Major intersections ===
The entire route is in Capital Regional District.

| Location | km | mi | Destinations | Notes |
|---|---|---|---|---|
| Saanich | 0.0 | 0.0 | Highway 17 / Royal Oak Drive – Victoria, Swartz Bay ferry terminal | Interchange; Highway 17 exit 11; former Highway 17A followed Royal Oak Drive |
| Saanich | 0.7 | 0.43 | West Saanich Road / Wilkinson Road | Former Highway 17A followed West Saanich Road |
| Central Saanich | 11.7 | 7.3 | Verdier Avenue – Ferry | Brentwood Bay; ferry to Mill Bay (Highway 902:2402); Highway 902:0320 southern terminus |
| North Saanich | 18.5 | 11.5 | McTavish Road (Highway 902:0325 east) – Airport, Ferries, Sidney | Highway 902:0320 northern terminus |
| North Saanich | 24.6 | 15.3 | Wain Road / West Saanich Road | Former Highway 17A followed Wain Road |
| North Saanich | 26.9 | 16.7 | Highway 17 / McDonald Park Road – Victoria, Swartz Bay ferry terminal | Interchange; Highway 17 exit 31; BC Ferries to Vancouver and Gulf Islands |
1.000 mi = 1.609 km; 1.000 km = 0.621 mi: Closed/former
