= British Columbia Highway 17 =

Highway in British Columbia

Highway 17
- Patricia Bay Highway (Vancouver Island section); South Fraser Perimeter Road (Mainland section)
- Highway 17 highlighted in red, bottom left shows Highway 17 on Vancouver Island.

Route information
- Maintained by the Ministry of Transportation and Infrastructure
- Length: 121 km (75 mi)
- Existed: 1960–present

Vancouver Island section
- Length: 33 km (21 mi)
- South end: Victoria Harbour ferry terminal
- Major intersections: Highway 1 (TCH) in Victoria
- North end: Swartz Bay Ferry Terminal

Mainland section
- Length: 44 km (27 mi)
- West end: Tsawwassen Ferry Terminal
- Major intersections: Highway 17A in Delta; Highway 99 in Delta; Highway 91 in Delta (via Hwy 91C)
- East end: Highway 1 (TCH) / Highway 15 in Surrey

Location
- Country: Canada
- Province: British Columbia
- Regional districts: Capital, Metro Vancouver
- Major cities: Victoria, Delta, Surrey

Highway system
- British Columbia provincial highways
← Highway 16	→ Highway 17A

Highway 17 is a provincial highway in British Columbia, Canada. It comprises two separate sections connected by a ferry link. The Vancouver Island section is known as the Patricia Bay Highway and connects Victoria with the Swartz Bay ferry terminal in North Saanich. The Lower Mainland section is known as the South Fraser Perimeter Road (SFPR) and links the Tsawwassen ferry terminal with Delta and Surrey, terminating at an interchange with Highway 1 in the Fraser Valley.

== Route description ==
=== Vancouver Island section ===
The Island section of Highway 17 is known as the Patricia Bay Highway (locally abbreviated as the Pat Bay Highway) after nearby Patricia Bay, and is the main artery through the Saanich Peninsula, mostly travelling along its eastern coast. The highway is four lanes all the way from Victoria to Swartz Bay. The total length of the highway on the Island is 32 kilometres (20 mi). Highway 17 has had its present course through the area since 1978 when the Blanshard extension was completed.

In the south, Highway 17 begins at the intersection of Belleville and Oswego streets, at the entrance to the Victoria Harbour ferry terminal, which provides a ferry connection to Port Angeles, Washington. It travels east for 600 metres (2,000 ft; 0.60 km; 0.37 mi), past the grounds of the British Columbia Parliament Buildings, to Douglas Street where it intersects the Trans-Canada Highway (Highway 1). It travels another 180 metres (590 ft; 0.18 km; 0.11 mi) east, where the highway turns north as Blanshard Street (a six lane divided city street) for three kilometres (1.9 mi) through the city of Victoria before leaving the city at Tolmie Avenue and for another two kilometres (1.2 mi) north through the district of Saanich to the Uptown Shopping Centre; Highway 17 then becomes the Pat Bay Highway and turns into a six-kilometre (3.7 mi) freeway, with three interchanges. After the third interchange at Royal Oak Drive, Highway 17 turns into a fourteen-kilometre (8.7 mi) mix of divided, four-lane, arterial expressway including interchanges at Keating Cross Road and McTavish Road, until it reaches the town of Sidney. After exiting Sidney three kilometres (1.9 mi) later, the Pat Bay once again becomes a freeway, with two more interchanges along its length, toward its northern terminus at the Swartz Bay ferry terminal another three kilometres (1.9 mi) north.

=== Ferry route ===
At Swartz Bay, Highway 17 leaves Vancouver Island and starts on a 24-nautical-mile (44-kilometre; 28-mile) ferry route through the Southern Gulf Islands and the Strait of Georgia. The ferry route between Swartz Bay and the Mainland is the oldest and most heavily used route in the B.C. Ferries system. After winding through the Gulf Islands, the route enters a small passage between Galiano and Mayne Islands, known as Active Pass. Active Pass is the midway point on the Highway 17 ferry route, but it is also the most hazardous part, as it has strong tidal currents, and has historically been the site of two maritime collisions involving BC Ferries vessels, as well as one incident of a ferry running aground. Consequently, ferries going through Active Pass have to sound their whistles upon entering and leaving the passage, and must adhere to a lower speed limit while transiting through it.

After Active Pass, the Highway 17 ferry heads due northeast across the Strait of Georgia. Halfway across the Strait, the route begins transiting United States waters for just under five nautical miles (5.8 mi; 9.3 km). It then crosses the 49th parallel back into Canadian waters just before landing at the Tsawwassen Ferry Terminal.

=== Mainland section ===
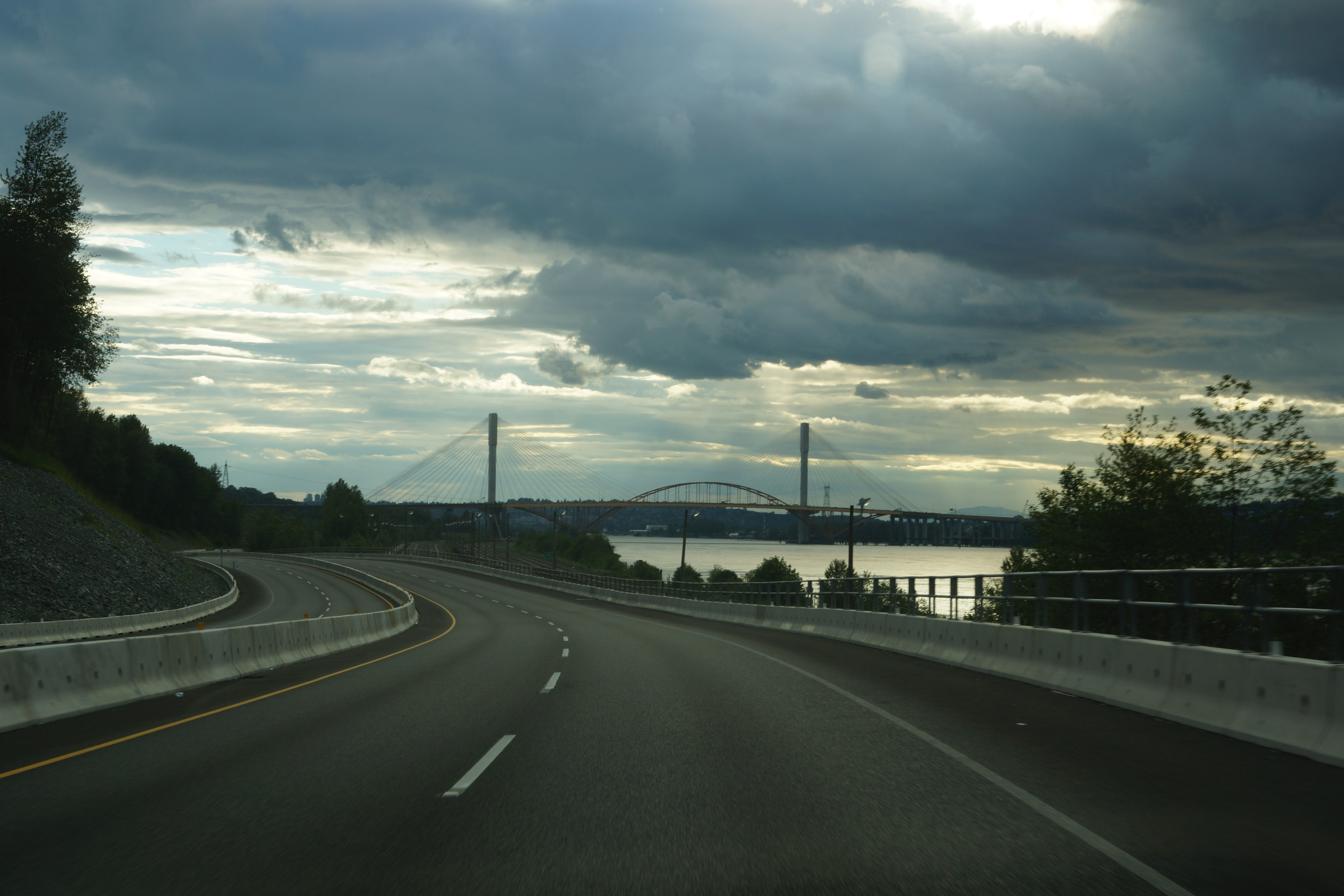
Highway 17 looking South near Port Mann (Surrey) British Columbia. New and old Port Mann Bridge in background.

On the Mainland, Highway 17 is known as the South Fraser Perimeter Road (SFPR), a component of the British Columbia Ministry of Transportation's Gateway Program. It is a four-lane highway with a mix of freeway and expressway sections. The highway has a speed limit of 80 km/h (50 mph) over most of its length, connecting the Tsawwassen Ferry Terminal and Highway 99 in Delta with Highway 1 at 176th Street in Surrey, and providing access to all five of the major Fraser River crossings in Metro Vancouver. The mainland section is notable for its extensive use of noise walls, split level construction through Delta and use in some urban sections of so-called Quiet Pavement to reduce traffic noise.

The South Fraser Perimeter Road is 44 kilometres (27 mi) long. Beginning at the Tsawwassen Ferry Terminal, it heads northeast on a 1.8-kilometre (1.1 mi) long causeway to land on the Tsawwassen Peninsula, then continues northeast for five kilometres (3.1 mi) to an interchange with Highway 17A. It then follows the CN Railway's Deltaport chord and 72nd Street northeast for 6.2 kilometres (3.9 mi) to an interchange with Highway 99. The road then runs through the west side of Burns Bog, but avoiding the conservation area, and past the south side of the Tilbury and Sunbury industrial areas for 9.7 kilometres (6.0 mi) before it reaches the Fraser River at an interchange connecting to Highway 91 via Highway 91 Connector. It then proceeds east along the south bank of the Fraser River through North Delta and Surrey, passing under the Alex Fraser, stal̕əw̓asəm and Port Mann bridges, before turning southeast at Surrey Bend Regional Park to terminate at its junction with Highway 1 and Highway 15, 21 kilometres (13 mi) from Highway 91 Connector.

== History ==
=== Vancouver Island Section ===
Prior to 1978, the southern terminus of Highway 17 was at the present-day intersection of Highway 1 (Douglas Street) and Carey Road. In 1978, the highway was extended and aligned along Blanshard Street through Downtown Victoria to the Inner Harbour in an effort to improve traffic flow.

=== South Fraser Perimeter Road ===
Route 17 once followed what is now Route 17A and terminated at the Highway 99 interchange before the George Massey Tunnel. The provincial government proposed to build a new expressway, the South Fraser Perimeter Road (SFPR), linking the Tsawwassen Ferry Terminal with the Trans-Canada Highway. According to the Ministry of Transportation, the South Fraser Perimeter Road will improve the movement of goods and people across the region while also alleviating truck traffic on municipal roads. West–east travel times across the region will also be significantly reduced.

The South Fraser Perimeter Road project was opposed by a number of groups, citing a variety of concerns. The SFPR alignment does not go through the Burns Bog Ecological Conservancy Area. However, the Burns Bog Conservation Society has stated they are concerned that it will affect surrounding hydrology, and have an adverse effect on the Conservancy Area.

The Burns Bog Conservation Society expressed concerns that the South Fraser Perimeter Road would endanger Burns Bog. In response to the mitigation measures proposed the Environmental Stewardship Branch of Environment Canada wrote that "... the changes are not sufficient to alleviate its concerns related to the impacts of the Project on Pacific Water Shrew (PWS), hydrology, aerial deposition, and ecological integrity of Burns Bog." On November 24, 2010 the Burns Bog Conservation Society launched a lawsuit intend to force the re-routing or cancellation of the SFPR project. Burns Bog has been listed as threatened by the International Mire Conservation Group because of the impacts of the SFPR.

The Wilderness Committee and other groups have criticized the SFPR, and the Gateway Program in general, for increasing greenhouse gas emissions. In early 2011, a protest camp organized by StopThePave.org and the Council of Canadians occupied a SFPR construction site for almost two weeks.

The SFPR Project worked with the Burns Bog Scientific Advisory Panel to develop systems, which helped improve the existing drainage / hydrology of the bog.

A 10-kilometre (6.2 mi) portion from 136 Street in Surrey to a junction with Highway 15 and Highway 1 was the first portion of the SFPR to be completed, opening on December 1, 2012. The remaining western segment of the road was completed on December 21, 2013. The former Mainland portion of Highway 17 north of the 28th Avenue overpass has been renamed to Highway 17A through Ladner. The total cost of building the SFPR was $1.26 billion.

On March 10, 2017, an announcement was made to address congestion at Highway 17 (Delta): an extension of westbound slip lane from Tilbury Connector (80th Avenue) intersection, replacement of the traffic light-controlled Highway 91 Connector with an interchange, and construction of a new interchange at River Road. This would make the road a freeway all the way to Tannery Road. Funding will come from the Canadian government, the BC Government, the Vancouver Fraser Port Authority, and the Tsawwassen First Nation; the total cost is expected to be just over $245 million. Construction started in spring 2020 and the new River Road interchange opened on December 3, 2021. The new Highway 91 Connector interchange reached completion in November 2022.. In 2025 the signalized intersection at Old Yale Road and Highway 17 was removed and replaced with an overpass as part of the Pattullo Bridge replacement project.

== Future ==
On Vancouver Island, there have been numerous studies to upgrade the Island portion of Highway 17 to freeway standard. This seems to be edging closer with the BC Government's issuing of the Highway 17 Corridor Planning Strategy. This study envisions interchanges at Haliburton, Sayward, Keating Cross Road and/or Island View, Mt Newton Cross Road, McTavish Road (Complete April 9, 2011) and Beacon Avenue in Sidney. Construction of a flyover ramp from northbound Highway 17 to Keating Cross Road which was completed in July of 2025.

As part of the Pattullo Bridge replacement project, the initial plan included a new interchange to provide direct connections to and from Highway 17 to the bridge as well as an extension of Scott Road north of King George Boulevard to directly connect with Highway 17 to divert traffic from local streets in Surrey. However, the project was down-scaled as the study showed Highway 17 cannot handle the increased traffic from induced demand and significant traffic delay would be expected on the provincial road network. Under the final proposal tendered in 2020, the only direct connection from the Pattullo Bridge replacement would be from the bridge eastbound to Highway 17 westbound, while the Highway 17 and Old Yale Road intersection would be closed and grade-separated.

== Major intersections ==
Regional District	Location	km	mi	Exit	Destinations	Notes
Capital	Victoria	0.00	0.00		Oswego Street / Belleville Street – Belleville Terminal	Highway 17 southern terminus; Highway 17 follows Belleville Street; Black Ball Ferries to Port Angeles; Victoria Clipper passenger ferry to Seattle
Capital	Victoria	0.60	0.37		Douglas Street (Highway 1) – Nanaimo	
Capital	Victoria	1.30	0.81		Blanshard Street	Highway 17 follows Blanshard Street
Capital	Victoria	1.60	0.99		Johnson Street	One-way pair; access to Johnson Street Bridge
Capital	Victoria	1.70	1.06		Pandora Avenue	One-way pair; access to Johnson Street Bridge
Capital	Victoria	2.60	1.62		Bay Street	
Capital	Victoria	4.00	2.49		Tolmie Avenue	
Capital	Victoria	4.00	2.49	North end of City of Victoria jurisdiction		
Capital	Saanich	4.86	3.02	South end of one-way pair; northbound becomes Vernon Avenue, southbound remains Blanshard Street		
Capital	Saanich	4.91	3.05		Saanich Road	At-grade, traffic signals
Capital	Saanich	5.62	3.49	North end of one-way pair; becomes Patricia Bay Highway		
Capital	Saanich	6.56	4.08	7	McKenzie Avenue (Highway 902:0313 west) to Highway 1 (TCH) / Highway 14 – Nanaimo, Sooke	Interchange
Capital	Saanich	8.06	5.01	8	Vanalman Avenue	Southbound right-in/right-out
Capital	Saanich	8.73	5.42	9	Quadra Street east / West Saanich Road	Interchange; no southbound access to westbound West Saanich Road
Capital	Saanich	10.12	6.29	11	Royal Oak Drive – Brentwood Bay	Interchange; former Highway 17A north
Capital	Saanich	11.85	7.36	(13)	Elk Lake Drive / Haliburton Road	At-grade, traffic signals
Capital	Saanich	14.49	9.00	(15)	Sayward Road	At-grade, traffic signals
Capital	Central Saanich	17.52	10.89	18	Keating Cross Road – Brentwood Bay, Mill Bay, Butchart Gardens	Interchange; northbound exit and southbound entrance; opened July 28, 2025
Capital	Central Saanich	18.47	11.48	(19)	Island View Road	At-grade, traffic signals; southbound access to Keating Cross Road
Capital	Central Saanich	20.96	13.02	(21)	Mount Newton Cross Road – Saanichton, Brentwood Bay	At-grade, traffic signals
Capital	North Saanich	25.25	15.69	26	McTavish Road (Highway 902:0325 west / Highway 902:0326 east) – Sidney, Victoria YYJ	Interchange; former access to Anacortes–San Juan Islands ferry (suspended in 2020)
Capital	Sidney	27.44	17.05	(28)	Beacon Avenue	At-grade, traffic signals
Capital	North Saanich	30.90	19.20	31	McDonald Park Road / Wain Road – Deep Cove	Interchange; former Highway 17A south
Capital	North Saanich	32.26	20.05	33	Lands End Road	Interchange; northbound exit and southbound entrance
Capital	North Saanich	32.54	20.22	Swartz Bay ferry terminal		
Strait of Georgia				BC Ferries from Swartz Bay to Tsawwassen		
Metro Vancouver	Delta	0.00	0.00		To Highway 19 – Duke Point ferry terminal, Nanaimo	Westbound access to ferry; eastbound access from ferry
Metro Vancouver	Delta	0.00	0.00	Tsawwassen ferry terminal		
Metro Vancouver	Delta	5.32	3.31		56 Street – Tsawwassen, Point Roberts	At-grade, traffic signals
Metro Vancouver	Delta	6.86	4.26	7	Highway 17A north – Ladner	Eastbound exit and westbound entrance
Metro Vancouver	Delta	7.60	4.72	8	Deltaport Way (Highway 901:3191 west) – Roberts Bank	Westbound exit and eastbound entrance
Metro Vancouver	Delta	13.09	8.13	13	Highway 99 – Airport (YVR), Vancouver, Surrey, USA Border	Interchange; Highway 99 exit 26; no direct access from Highway 17 west to Highway 99 south
Metro Vancouver	Delta	19.30	11.99		80 Street (via Tilbury Connector)	At-grade, traffic signals
Metro Vancouver	Delta	22.83– 22.96	14.19– 14.27	23	Highway 91C to Highway 91 / Nordel Way / River Road West – Alex Fraser Bridge, Airport	Westbound signed as exits 23A (River Road) and 23B (Highway 91C / Nordel Way); Highway 91 exit 8
Metro Vancouver	Delta	24.01	14.92	Passes under the Alex Fraser Bridge		
Metro Vancouver	Surrey	29.68	18.44	31	Tannery Road	Interchange; eastbound exit ramp includes right-in/right-out ramps to/from 103A Avenue
Metro Vancouver	Surrey	30.95	19.23	Passes under the Pattullo Bridge (closed)		
Metro Vancouver	Surrey	30.95	19.23		stal̕əw̓asəm Bridge	Interchange; westbound entrance from eastbound stal̕əw̓asəm Bridge
Metro Vancouver	Surrey	31.69	19.69	33	124 Street	Eastbound right-in/right-out
Metro Vancouver	Surrey	32.99	20.50		Bridgeview Drive to King George Boulevard – Surrey City Centre, New Westminster	At-grade, traffic signals; to stal̕əw̓asəm Bridge
Metro Vancouver	Surrey	34.20	21.25		136 Street	At-grade, traffic signals
Metro Vancouver	Surrey	36.73	22.82	Passes under the Port Mann Bridge		
Metro Vancouver	Surrey	37.33	23.20	39	North Surrey Truck Parking Facility	At-grade, seagull intersection; traffic signals for westbound traffic; to North Surrey Truck Parking Facility
Metro Vancouver	Surrey	42.89	26.65		104 Avenue / Golden Ears Connector (Highway 901:3144 east)	At-grade, traffic signals; access to Golden Ears Bridge
Metro Vancouver	Surrey	44.14	27.43		Highway 1 (TCH) – Hope, Vancouver Highway 15 south (176 Street) – USA border	Interchange; Highway 1 exit 53; eastern terminus; road continues as Highway 15
1.000 mi = 1.609 km; 1.000 km = 0.621 mi: Incomplete access; Tolled; Route transition; Unopened
