= Active Pass =

Strait in British Columbia

Coordinates: 48°51′35″N 123°18′43″W

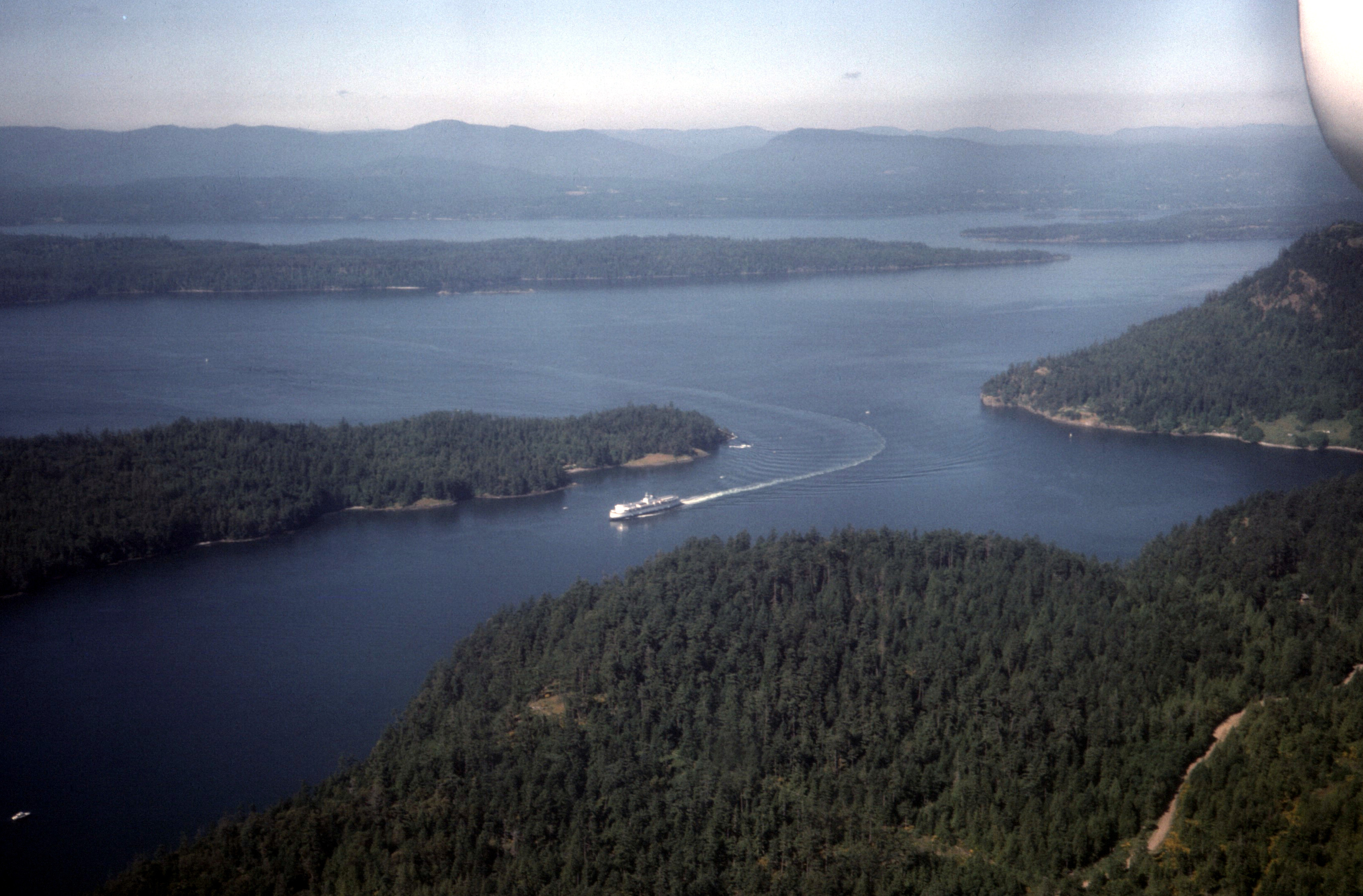
Aerial view of a BC Ferry at Active Pass sailing from Trincomali Channel in the west

Active Pass (Saanich: SḴŦAḴ) is a strait separating Galiano Island in the north and Mayne Island in the south in the southern Gulf Islands, British Columbia, Canada. It connects the Trincomali Channel in the west and the Strait of Georgia in the east. The pass stretches 5.5 km from northeast to southwest with two roughly right-angle bends, one at each end.

It was named for the USCS Active, a United States Navy survey vessel, the first steamer to navigate the pass in 1855.

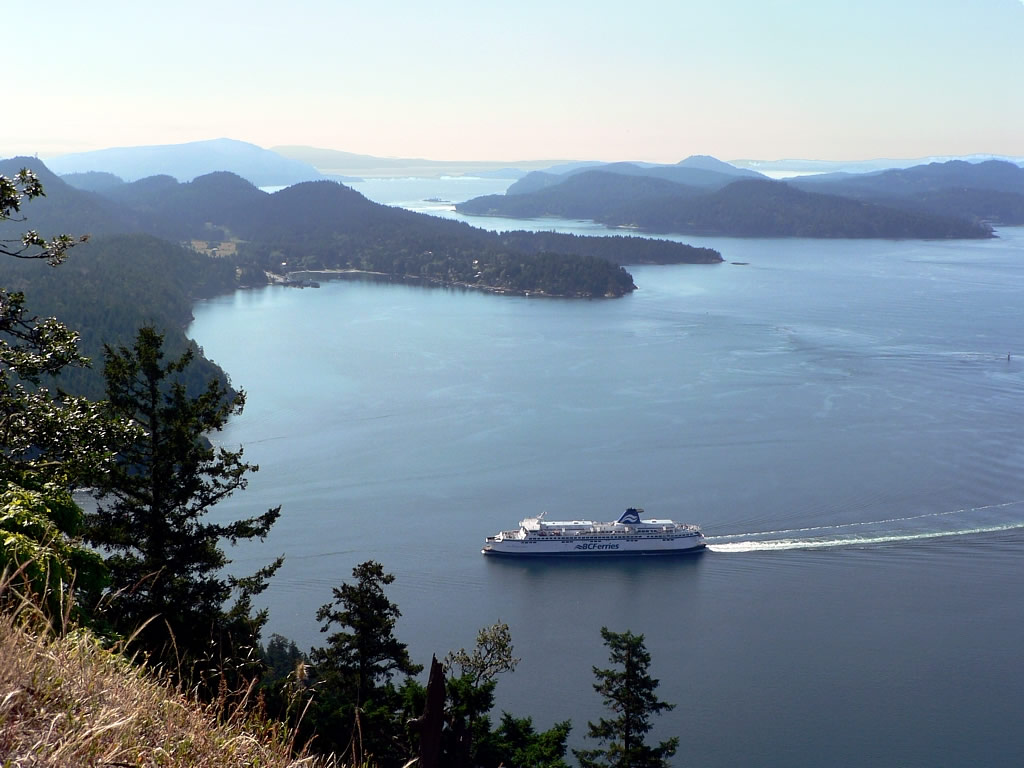
Active Pass with BC Ferry (Spirit-class ferry) from Galiano Island

From 1967 to 2011, the Active Pass light station was part of the British Columbia Shore Station Oceanographic Program, collecting coastal water temperature and salinity measurements for the Department of Fisheries and Oceans everyday for 44 years.

Currently, the pass is a major shipping lane and is primarily used by BC Ferries' passenger and vehicle ferry runs between Tsawwassen Ferry Terminal at Tsawwassen, Lower Mainland, the southern Gulf Islands and Swartz Bay Ferry Terminal at Swartz Bay, Vancouver Island. Because the pass has a river's narrowness, the ferries pass extremely close to its shores. It is also used by pleasure craft, fishing boats, freighters and freight ferries, making it very 'active' commercially as well. However, strong eddies and tide rips are always present in the pass, making it a hazardous corridor for smaller vessels to transit.

A variety of wildlife may be seen in the pass, including harbour seals, sea lions, bald eagles, seagulls, and orcas.

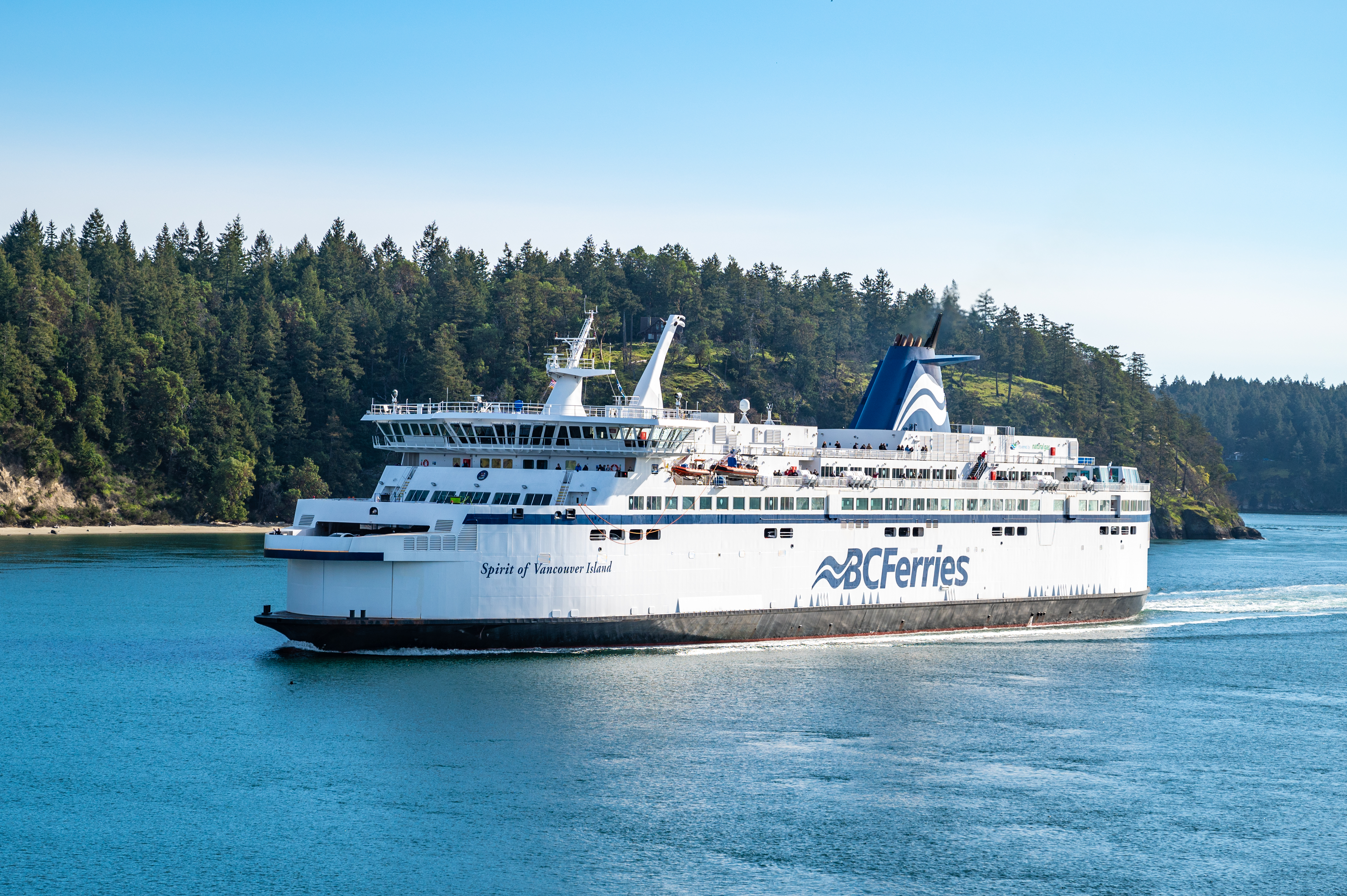
BC Ferries, MV Spirit of Vancouver Island, in Active Pass, between Galiano Island and Mayne Island

== Accidents in Active Pass ==
- On 8 September 1968, HMCS Saskatchewan ran aground while transiting Active Pass in fog. The captain was court martialed and found guilty of negligence.
- On 2 August 1970, three people aboard the BC Ferry Queen of Victoria perished and the ship itself suffered close to $1 million damage when a Russian freighter, the Sergey Yesenin, struck it in Active Pass.
- On 9 August 1979, the BC Ferry Queen of Alberni ran aground at Collinson Reef in Active Pass, causing the vessel to tip dramatically to one side. Extensive vehicle and ship damage occurred, as well as the casualty of a racehorse.
- On 6 November 2015, a man jumped from the deck of a BC Ferry in Active Pass and swam to Galiano Island. He was later arrested after breaking into a cabin.

== See more ==
- List of BC Ferries accidents and incidents
