= S-class ferry =

BC Ferries RORO ferry class

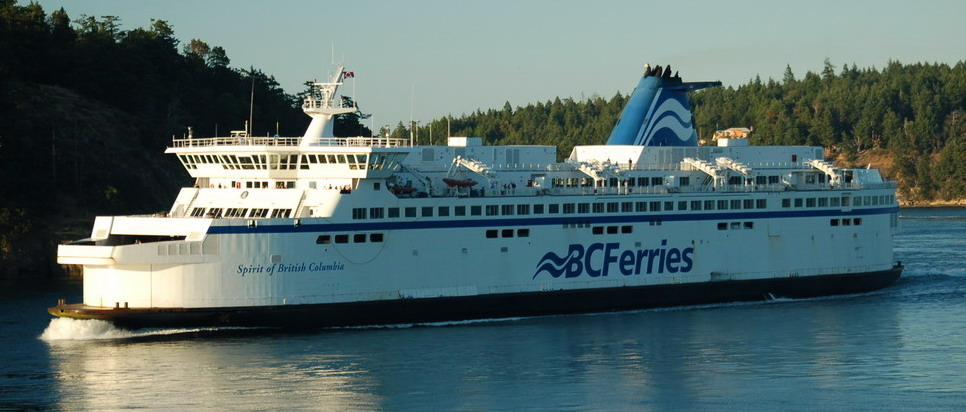
- Spirit of British Columbia

Class overview
- Operators: BC Ferries
- Preceded by: Victoria class; Cowichan class
- Built: 1992–1994
- In service: 1993–present
- Planned: 2
- Completed: 2
- Active: 2

General characteristics as built
- Type: Ferry
- Tonnage: 18,747 GT; 2,925 DWT
- Displacement: 11,681 t (11,497 long tons)
- Length: 167.5 m (549 ft 6 in)
- Beam: 27.1 m (88 ft 11 in)
- Draught: 5 m (16 ft 5 in)
- Depth: 8 m (26 ft 3 in)
- Installed power: 21,394 hp (15,954 kW)
- Propulsion: 4 × MAN-B&W 6L 40/54 diesel engines
- Speed: 19.5 knots (36.1 km/h; 22.4 mph)
- Capacity: 2,100 passengers and crew; 358 vehicles

S-class ferries (also known as the Spirit class or Super ferries) are roll-on/roll-off (RORO) ferries operated by BC Ferries in British Columbia, Canada. They are the largest ferries in the BC Ferries fleet. The class comprises two ships, Spirit of British Columbia and Spirit of Vancouver Island, which were completed in 1993 and 1994 respectively. They serve the ferry route between Tsawwassen and Swartz Bay. In 2017, the class underwent conversion to a dual-fuel propulsion system that would allow them to use either marine diesel fuel or liquefied natural gas.

== Design and description ==
The S-class roll on/roll off ferries are the largest vessels in the BC Ferries fleet. They are 167.5 m (549 ft 6 in) long overall and 156.0 m (511 ft 10 in) between perpendiculars with a beam of 32.9 m (107 ft 11 in). The vessels have a displacement of 11,681 tonnes (11,497 long tons), an initial 18,747 gross tonnage (GT) and 2,925 tons deadweight (DWT). The gross tonnage later increased to 21,935 for Spirit of Vancouver and 21,958 for Spirit of British Columbia as of 2018.

The vessels were initially powered by four MAN 6L40/54 diesel engines driving two shafts creating 21,394 horsepower (15,954 kW). The ferries have a maximum speed of 19.5 knots (36.1 km/h; 22.4 mph). In 2018, the ferries began a mid-life refit that involved changing the propulsion system to a dual-fuel system comprising four Wärtsilä 34DF dual-fuel engines which allow the ships to use either marine diesel oil or liquefied natural gas to power the ship. Further changes include navigation and propulsion equipment, steering and evacuation systems, lighting and air conditioning. Passenger areas were upgraded including the lounges, bathrooms and retail areas.

The ferries have capacity for 2,100 passengers and crew and 358 automobiles. The ferries are equipped with lounges and cafes.

== Ships in class ==
S class
Name	Launched	Completed	Route	Status	Notes
Spirit of British Columbia	April 17, 1992	February 1993	1 - Tsawwassen–Swartz Bay	In service	
Spirit of Vancouver Island	1994	February 1994	1 - Swartz Bay–Tsawwassen	In service	

== History ==
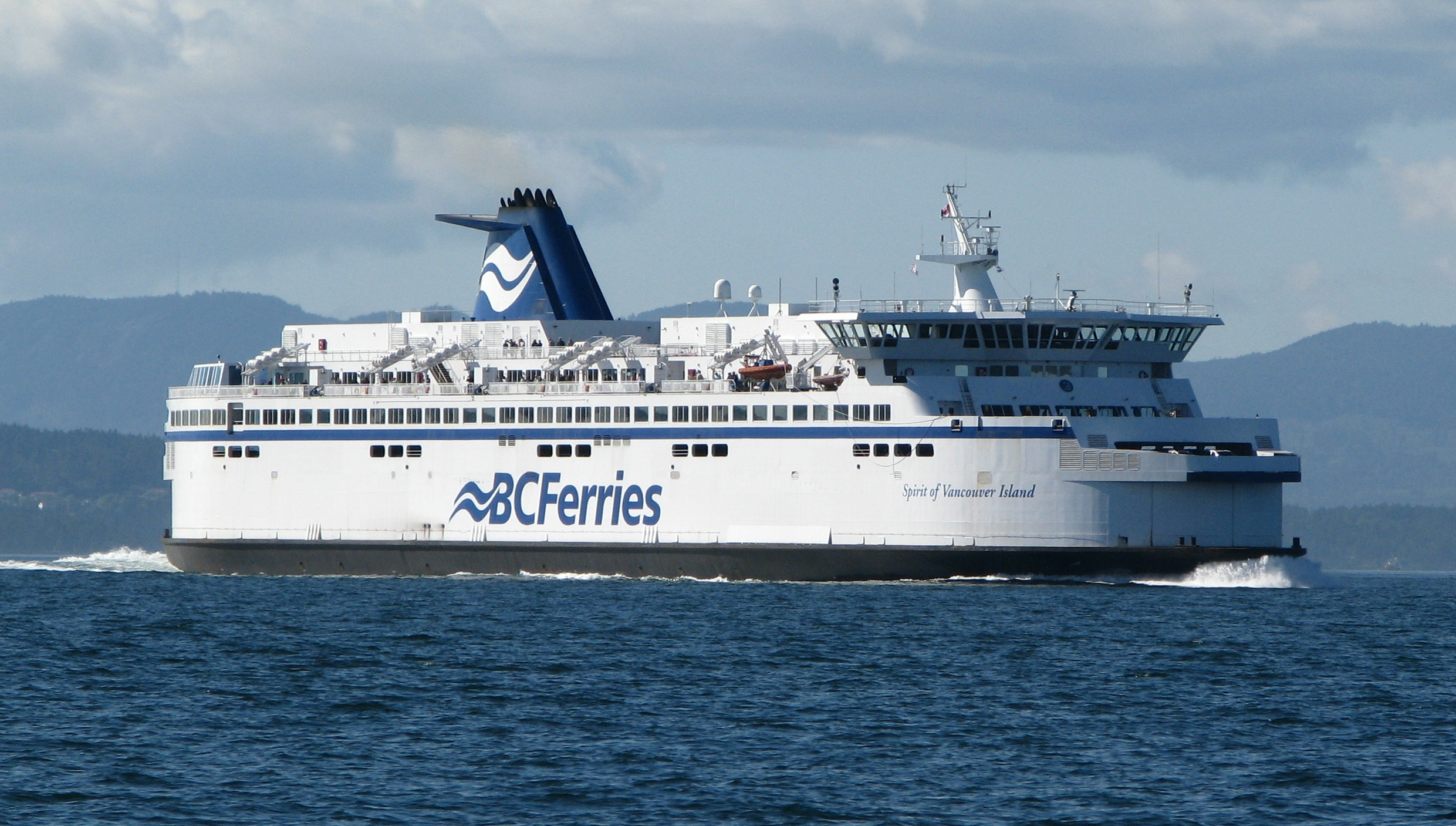
Spirit of Vancouver Island

The two ferries, Spirit of British Columbia and Spirit of Vancouver Island, were constructed in two pieces. The ferries' foreparts were built by Allied Shipbuilders of North Vancouver, British Columbia. The rest of the ships were constructed by Integrated Ferry of Esquimalt, British Columbia. The two sections were joined and Spirit of British Columbia was completed in February 1993, with Spirit of Vancouver Island completed in February 1994. Spirit of British Columbia was assigned to the Tsawwassen–Swartz Bay route and Spirit of Vancouver Island to the inverse Swartz Bay–Tsawwassen route.

On September 14, 2000, Spirit of Vancouver Island collided with the 9.72-metre (31.9 ft) Star Ruby while attempting to overtake the vessel in a narrow channel. The accident report found that pleasure craft had ignored all warnings of the impending collision. Two passengers aboard Star Ruby later died as a result of their injuries sustained by the collision. From 2005 to 2006, the S-class ferries underwent major refits.

In 2017, it was announced that the two S-class ferries would undergo a $140 million conversion to a dual-fuel system to allow the vessels to use liquefied natural gas as fuel in an effort to reduce greenhouse gas emissions. Further modifications during the conversion included the replacement of navigation and propulsion systems and a general overhaul. Passenger areas were modified as well. Spirit of British Columbia was the first to undergo the conversion at the Remontowa Ship Repair Yard in Gdańsk, Poland, between 2017 and 2018. Spirit of Vancouver Island's retrofit began in September 2018 and the vessel returned to service in April 2019. The conversion of Spirit of British Columbia earned BC Ferries the Shippax Retrofit Award, which identifies innovation in the ferry industry.

Preceded by V class	BC Ferries Mainland-Island flagship 1993–1999	Succeeded by PacifiCat class
Preceded by PacifiCat Series	BC Ferries Mainland-Island flagship 2000–present	Succeeded by Coastal class
