= Spirit of Vancouver Island =

Canadian roll-on roll-off ferry

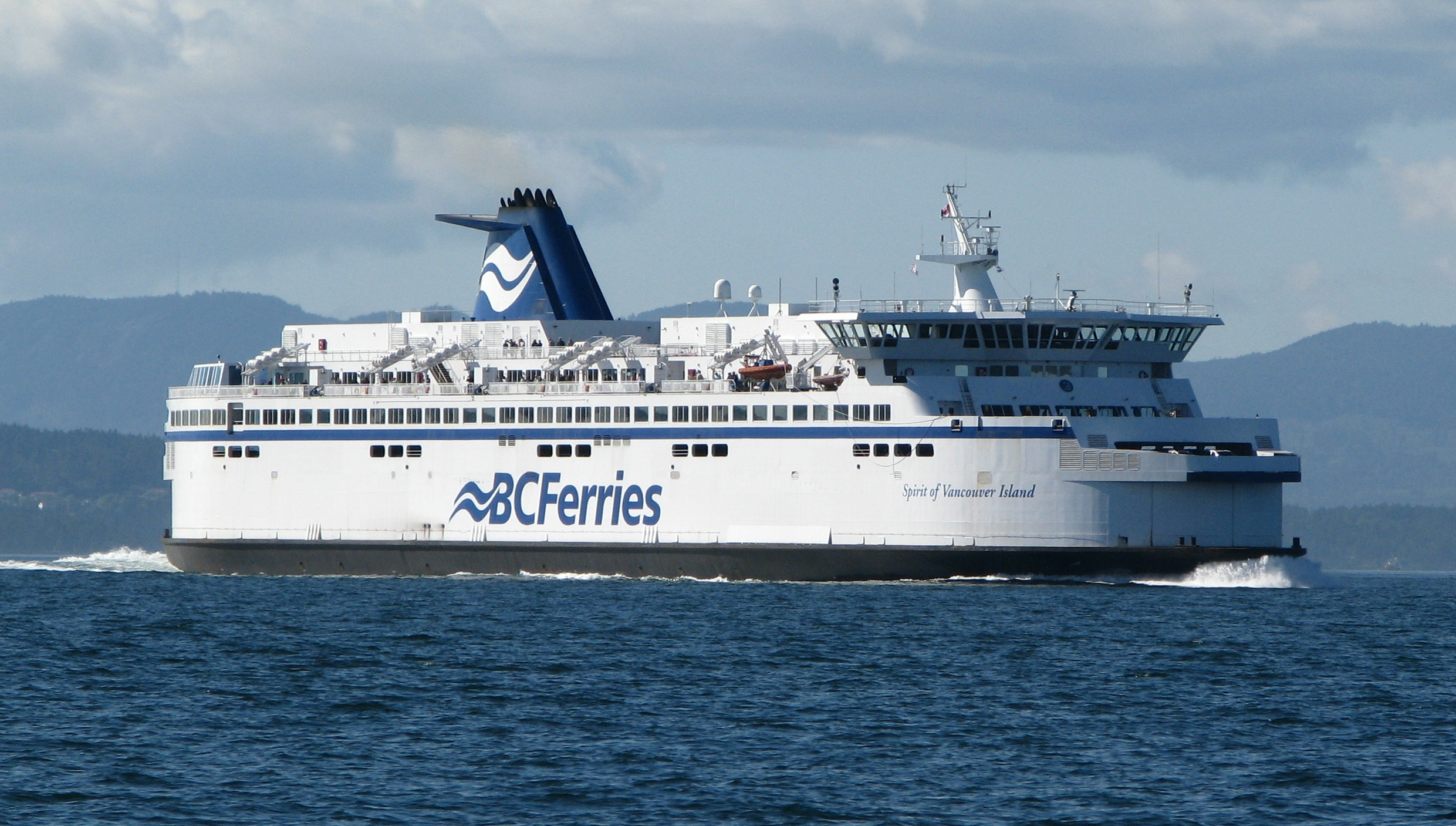
- Spirit of Vancouver Island

History

Canada
- Name: Spirit of Vancouver Island
- Owner: British Columbia Ferry Services Inc.
- Operator: British Columbia Ferry Services Inc.
- Port of registry: Victoria, British Columbia
- Route: Swartz Bay – Tsawwassen
- Builder: Allied Shipbuilders, North Vancouver, Integrated Ferry, Esquimalt
- Yard number: 560
- Completed: February 1994
- Home port: Swartz Bay
- Identification: IMO number: 9030682; MMSI number: 316001269; Official number: 816503; Call sign: CFL2070
- Status: In service

General characteristics as built
- Class & type: S-class ferry
- Tonnage: 18,747 GT; 2,925 DWT
- Length: 167.5 m (549 ft 6 in) oa; 156.0 m (511 ft 10 in) pp
- Beam: 32.9 m (107 ft 11 in)
- Installed power: 21,394 hp (15,954 kW)
- Propulsion: 4 × Wärtsilä 34DF dual-fuel engines
- Speed: 19.5 knots (36.1 km/h; 22.4 mph)
- Capacity: 2,100 passengers & crew; 358 cars

Spirit of Vancouver Island is an S-class ferry, part of the BC Ferries fleet. Along with Spirit of British Columbia, it is the largest in the BC Ferries fleet. The ship was completed in 1994 and serves the Swartz Bay – Tsawwassen route. In 2018, Spirit of Vancouver Island began a mid-life refit in Poland, where it was converted to a dual-fuel system to allow liquefied natural gas propulsion. The vessel returned to service in 2019.

== Description ==
Spirit of Vancouver Island is an S-class roll-on/roll-off ferry that is 167.5 m (549 ft 6 in) long overall and 156.0 m (511 ft 10 in) between perpendiculars with a beam of 32.9 m (107 ft 11 in). The vessel has a displacement of 11,681 tonnes (11,497 long tons), an initial 18,747 gross tonnage (GT) and 2,925 tons deadweight (DWT). The gross tonnage later increased to 21,935 as of 2018.

The vessel was initially powered by four MAN 6L40/54 diesel engines driving two shafts creating 21,394 horsepower (15,954 kW). Spirit of Vancouver Island has a maximum speed of 19.5 knots (36.1 km/h; 22.4 mph). In 2018, the ferry began a mid-life refit that involved changing the propulsion system to a dual-fuel system comprising four Wärtsilä 34DF dual-fuel engines which allows the ship to use either marine diesel oil or liquefied natural gas to power the ship. Further changes include navigation and propulsion equipment, steering and evacuation systems, lighting and air conditioning. Passenger areas were upgraded including the lounges, bathrooms and retail areas.

The ferry has capacity for 2,100 passengers and crew and 358 automobiles. The ferry is equipped with lounges and cafes.

== Service history ==
Spirit of Vancouver Island was constructed in two parts in British Columbia. The ferry's forepart was built by Allied Shipbuilders of North Vancouver with the yard number 255. The rest of the ship was constructed by Integrated Ferry of Esquimalt, British Columbia with the yard number 560. The two sections were joined and the vessel was completed in February 1994. Owned and operated by BC Ferries, Spirit of Vancouver was assigned to the Swartz Bay – Tsawwassen route.

On September 14, 2000, Spirit of Vancouver Island collided with the 9.72-metre (31.9 ft) Star Ruby while attempting to overtake the vessel in a narrow channel. The collision occurred approximately 1 kilometre (0.6 mi) from the Swartz Bay Terminal where the ferry had departed from. Spirit of Vancouver Island struck Star Ruby on its port side, causing the pleasure craft to flip over and eventually right itself, though swamped and heavily damaged. According to the accident report, the pleasure craft ignored all warning blasts from the approaching ferry and then made a sharp turn towards the ferry just prior to impact. Two passengers aboard Star Ruby later died as a result of their injuries sustained by the collision. On July 13, 2003, Spirit of Vancouver Island collided with the dock at Swartz Bay. Four passengers suffered minor injuries. The incident caused tens of thousands of dollars of damage to the dock and the ship.

From 2005 to 2006, the S-class ferries underwent major refits. On October 9, 2009, a standby generator on Spirit of Vancouver Island caught fire on an early-morning sailing out of Swartz Bay Ferry Terminal. No one was injured in the incident; however, it did cause significant delays in the ferry system because of the already large volume of traffic for Thanksgiving weekend.

On August 27, 2017, the ferry rescued six people off Mayne Island. In March 2018, Spirit of Vancouver Island was temporarily withdrawn from service after a serious mechanical issue with its portside propeller. On August 31, 2018, two workers were injured during an early morning fire drill when a ship's davit malfunctioned, causing the rescue boat they were in to flip, sending the workers into the water. Four sailings were cancelled as a result. On September 14, 2018, Spirit of Vancouver Island sailed for Remontowa Ship Repair Yard in Gdańsk, Poland, to undergo conversion to a dual-fuel system. With the refit work completed by January 2019, the ferry departed Poland on February 2 and returned to British Columbia on April 2.

In April 2020, the vessel collided with the dock at Tsawwassen terminal. Two passengers and a crew member were injured in the collision. The Transportation Safety Board investigation found that the ship failed to respond to the crew's commands when they attempted to avoid the collision.

In September 2021, Spirit of Vancouver Island had an issue with the starboard gearbox. Repairs were completed by the end of October.
