= Lochside Regional Trail =

Trail in British Columbia, Canada

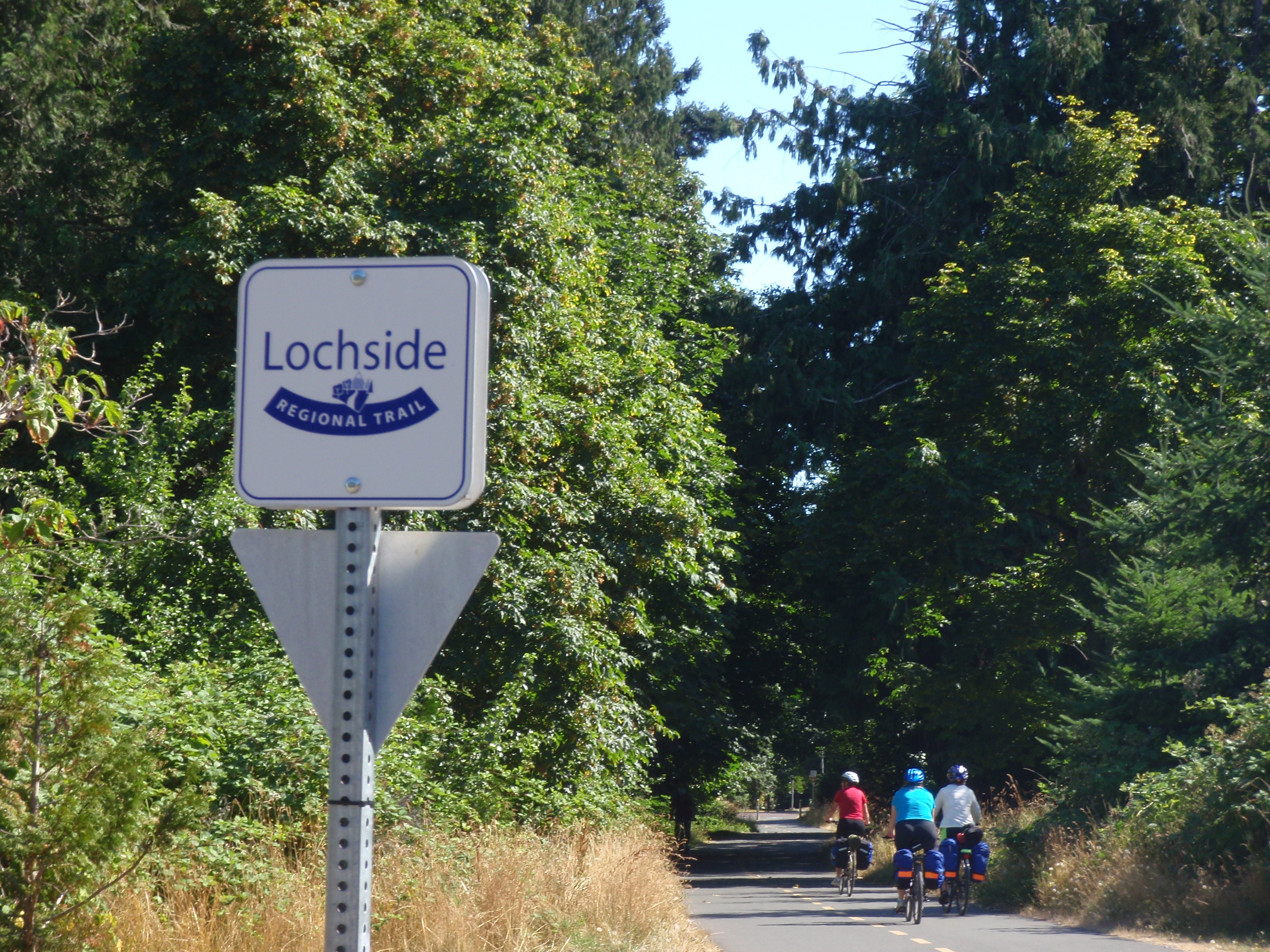
- Length: 29 km (18 mi)
- Location: British Columbia, Canada
- Trailheads: Victoria; Swartz Bay (Swartz Bay Ferry Terminal)
- Use: Hiking, Running, Cycling, Skateboarding, Horse Riding
- Difficulty: Accessible to Easy
- Sights: Swan Lake Nature Sanctuary
- Hazards: Road crossings
- Website: www.crd.bc.ca/parks-recreation-culture/parks-trails/find-park-trail/lochside

The Lochside Regional Trail is a 29-kilometre (18-mile) trail that runs from the Swartz Bay Ferry Terminal to Victoria, British Columbia, Canada. The trail is a popular route both for commuting and recreation. It is frequented by people walking, running, cycling, skateboarding and riding horses.

The trail was constructed in 2001 and connects to the longer Galloping Goose Regional Trail. The two trails connect at Switch Bridge in Saanich.

== History ==
At one time the trail originally began as a railway route built by the Canadian Northern Pacific Railway (by 1918 Canadian National). Starting from Victoria it went up the peninsula to Patricia Bay where the Coast Guard ships dock is. It followed what was the lochside trail then crossed the Victoria and Sidney Railway at Bazan. Heading west it would cross the British Columbia Electric Railway to get to the bay.

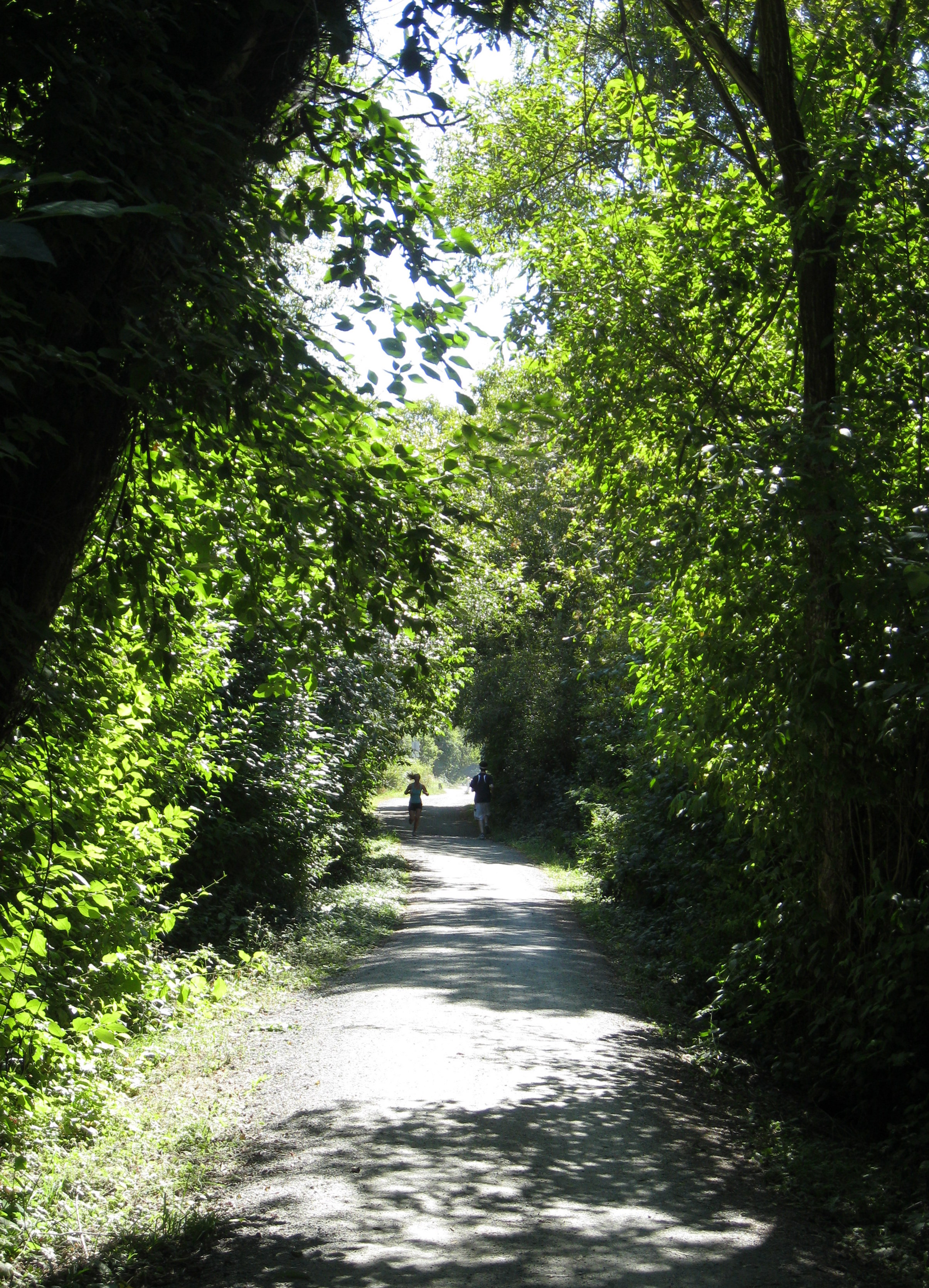
Lochside Trail looking south at Broadmead
