= Visbreaker =

Oil refinery processing unit

A visbreaker is a processing unit in an oil refinery whose purpose is to minimize the quantity of residual oil produced in the distillation of crude oil and to increase the yield of more valuable middle distillates (heating oil and diesel) by the refinery. A visbreaker thermally cracks large hydrocarbon molecules in the oil by heating in a furnace to lower its viscosity and to produce small quantities of light hydrocarbons. (LPG and gasoline). The process name of "visbreaker" refers to the fact that the process lowers (i.e., breaks) the viscosity of the residual oil. The process is non-catalytic.

== Process objectives ==
The objectives of visbreaking are:

- Lower the viscosity of the feed stream: Typically this is the residue from vacuum distillation of crude oil but can also be the residue from hydroskimming operations, natural bitumen from seeps in the ground or tar sands, and even certain high viscosity crude oils.
- Lower the amount of residual fuel oil produced by a refinery: Residual fuel oil is generally regarded as a low value product. Demand for residual fuel continues to decrease as it is replaced in its traditional markets, such as fuel needed to generate steam in power stations, by cleaner burning alternative fuels such as natural gas.
- Increase the proportion of middle distillates in the refinery output: Middle distillate is used as a diluent with residual oils to bring their viscosity down to a marketable level. By lowering the viscosity of the residual stream in a visbreaker, a fuel oil can be made using less diluent and the middle distillate saved can be diverted to higher value diesel or heating oil manufacture.

== Technology ==
=== Coil visbreaking ===
A schematic diagram of a Visbreaker unit

The term coil (or furnace) visbreaking is applied to units where the cracking process occurs in the furnace tubes (or "coils"). Material exiting the furnace is quenched to halt the cracking reactions: frequently this is achieved by heat exchange with the virgin material being fed to the furnace, which in turn is a good energy efficiency step, but sometimes a stream of cold oil (usually gas oil) is used to the same effect. The gas oil is recovered and re-used. The extent of the cracking reaction is controlled by regulation of the speed of flow of the oil through the furnace tubes. The quenched oil then passes to a fractionator where the products of the cracking (gas, LPG, gasoline, gas oil and tar) are separated and recovered.

=== Soaker visbreaking ===
In soaker visbreaking, the bulk of the cracking reaction occurs not in the furnace but in a drum located after the furnace called the soaker. Here the oil is held at an elevated temperature for a pre-determined period of time to allow cracking to occur before being quenched. The oil then passes to a fractionator. In soaker visbreaking, lower temperatures are used than in coil visbreaking. The comparatively long duration of the cracking reaction is used instead.

=== Process options ===
Visbreaker tar can be further refined by feeding it to a vacuum fractionator. Here additional heavy gas oil may be recovered and routed either to catalytic cracking, hydrocracking or thermal cracking units on the refinery. The vacuum-flashed tar (sometimes referred to as pitch) is then routed to fuel oil blending. In a few refinery locations, visbreaker tar is routed to a delayed coker for the production of certain specialist cokes such as anode coke or needle coke.

=== Soaker visbreaking versus coil visbreaking ===
From the standpoint of yield, there is little or nothing to choose between the two approaches. However, each offers significant advantages in particular situations:

- De-coking: The cracking reaction forms petroleum coke as a byproduct. In coil visbreaking, this deposits in the tubes of the furnace and will eventually lead to fouling or blocking of the tubes. The same will occur in the drum of a soaker visbreaker, though the lower temperatures used in the soaker drum lead to fouling at a much slower rate. Coil visbreakers therefore require frequent de-coking. This is quite labour-intensive, but can be developed into a routine where tubes are de-coked sequentially without the need to shut down the visbreaking operation. Soaker drums require far less frequent attention but their being taken out of service normally requires a complete halt to the operation. Which is the more disruptive activity will vary from refinery to refinery.
- Fuel Economy: The lower temperatures used in the soaker approach mean that these units use less fuel. In cases where a refinery buys fuel to support process operations, any savings in fuel consumption could be extremely valuable. In such cases, soaker visbreaking may be advantageous.

== Quality and yields ==
=== Feed quality and product quality ===
The quality of the feed going into a visbreaker will vary considerably with the type of crude oil that the refinery is processing. The following is a typical quality for the vacuum distillation residue of Arabian light (a crude oil from Saudi Arabia and widely refined around the world):

Density (kg/L)	Viscosity at 100 °C (centistokes)	Sulphur Content (wt%)
1.020	930	4.0

Once this material has been run through a visbreaker (and, again, there will be considerable variation from visbreaker to visbreaker as no two will operate under exactly the same conditions) the lowering in viscosity is dramatic:

Density (kg/L)	Viscosity at 100 °C (centistokes)	Sulphur Content (wt%)
1.048	115	4.7

=== Yields ===
The yields of the various hydrocarbon products will depend on the "severity" of the cracking operation as determined by the temperature the oil is heated to in the visbreaker furnace. At the low end of the scale, a furnace heating to 425 °C would crack only mildly, while operations at 500 °C would be considered as very severe. Arabian light crude residue when visbroken at 450 °C would yield around 76% (by weight) of tar, 15% middle distillates, 6% gasolines and 3% gas and LPG.

=== Fuel oil stability ===
The severity of visbreaker operation is normally limited by the need to produce a visbreaker tar that can be blended to make a stable fuel oil.

Stability in this case is taken to mean the tendency of a fuel oil to produce sediments when stored. These sediments are undesirable as they can quickly foul the filters of pumps used to move the oil necessitating time-consuming maintenance.

Vacuum residue fed to a visbreaker can be considered to be composed of the following:

- Asphaltenes: large polycyclic molecules that are suspended in the oil in a colloidal form
- Resins: also polycyclic but of a lower molecular weight than asphaltenes
- Aromatic hydrocarbons: derivatives of benzene, toluene and xylenes
- Parafinic hydrocarbons: alkanes

Visbreaking preferentially cracks aliphatic compounds which have relatively low sulphur contents, low density and high viscosity and the effect of their removal can be clearly seen in the change in quality between feed and product. A too severe cracking in a visbreaker will lead to the asphaltene colloid becoming metastable. Subsequent addition of a diluent to manufacture a finished fuel oil can cause the colloid to break down, precipitating asphaltenes as a sludge. It has been observed that a paraffinic diluent is more likely to cause precipitation than an aromatic one. Stability of fuel oil is assessed using a number of proprietary tests (for example "P" value and SHF tests).

== Economics ==
=== Viscosity blending ===
The viscosity blending of two or more liquids having different viscosities is a three-step procedure. The first step is to calculate the Viscosity Blending Index (VBI) of each component of the blend using the following equation (known as a Refutas equation):

(1) VBN = 14.534 × ln[ln(v + 0.8)] + 10.975

where v is the viscosity in square millimeters per second (mm²/s) or centistokes (cSt) and ln is the natural logarithm (log_{e}). It is important that the viscosity of each component of the blend be obtained at the same temperature.

The next step is to calculate the VBN of the blend, using this equation:

(2) VBN_{Blend} = [w_{A} × VBN_{A}] + [w_{B} × VBN_{B}] + ... + [w_{X} × VBN_{X}]

where w is the weight fraction (i.e., % ÷ 100) of each component of the blend.

Once the viscosity blending number of a blend has been calculated using equation (2), the final step is to determine the viscosity of the blend by using the invert of equation (1):

(3) v = e^{e^{(VBN - 10.975) ÷ 14.534}} − 0.8

where VBN is the viscosity blending number of the blend and e is the transcendental number 2.71828, also known as Euler's number.

=== Example economics for a two-component blend ===
A marketable fuel oil, such as for fueling a power station, might be required to have a viscosity of 40 centistokes at 100 °C. It might be prepared using either the virgin or visbroken residue described above combined with a distillate diluent ("cutter stock"). Such a cutter stock could typically have a viscosity at 100 °C of 1.3 centistokes. Rearranging equation (2) above for a simple two component blend shows that the percentage of cutterstock required in the blend is found by:

(4) %cutter stock = [VBN_{40} − VBN_{residue}] ÷ [VBN_{cutter stock} − VBN_{residue}]

Using the viscosities quoted in the tables above for the residues from Arab Light crude oil and calculating VBNs according to equation (1) gives:

For virgin residue (i.e., the unconverted feed to the visbreaker): 27.5% cutter stock in the blend

For visbroken residue: 13.3% cutter stock in the blend.

As middle distillates have a far higher value in the market place than fuel oils, it can be seen that the use of a visbreaker will considerably improve the economics of fuel oil manufacture. For example, if the cutter stock is taken to have a value of $300 per tonne and fuel oil $150 per ton (oil prices naturally change quickly, but these prices, and more importantly the differences between them, are not unrealistic), it is a simple matter to calculate the value of the different residues in this example as being:

Virgin residue: $93.1 per tonne

Visbroken residue: $127.0 per tonne
