= Roberts Bank =

Undersea bank near Vancouver, British Columbia

Coordinates: 49°03′42″N 123°10′39″W

Roberts Bank is an undersea bank in the Strait of Georgia on the south side of the estuary of the Fraser River approximately 35 kilometres (22 mi) south of Vancouver, British Columbia, Canada. Located between the South Arm of the Fraser River and Tsawwassen, it is significant as both a transport hub because of the Tsawwassen Ferry Terminal and port because of the Roberts Bank Superport, and as an area with important wetland habitat. The term properly refers to the shallows offshore from the Superport and wetland.
