= Stal̕əw̓asəm Bridge =

Bridge in New Westminster and Surrey, British Columbia

stal̕əw̓asəm Bridge Riverview Bridge
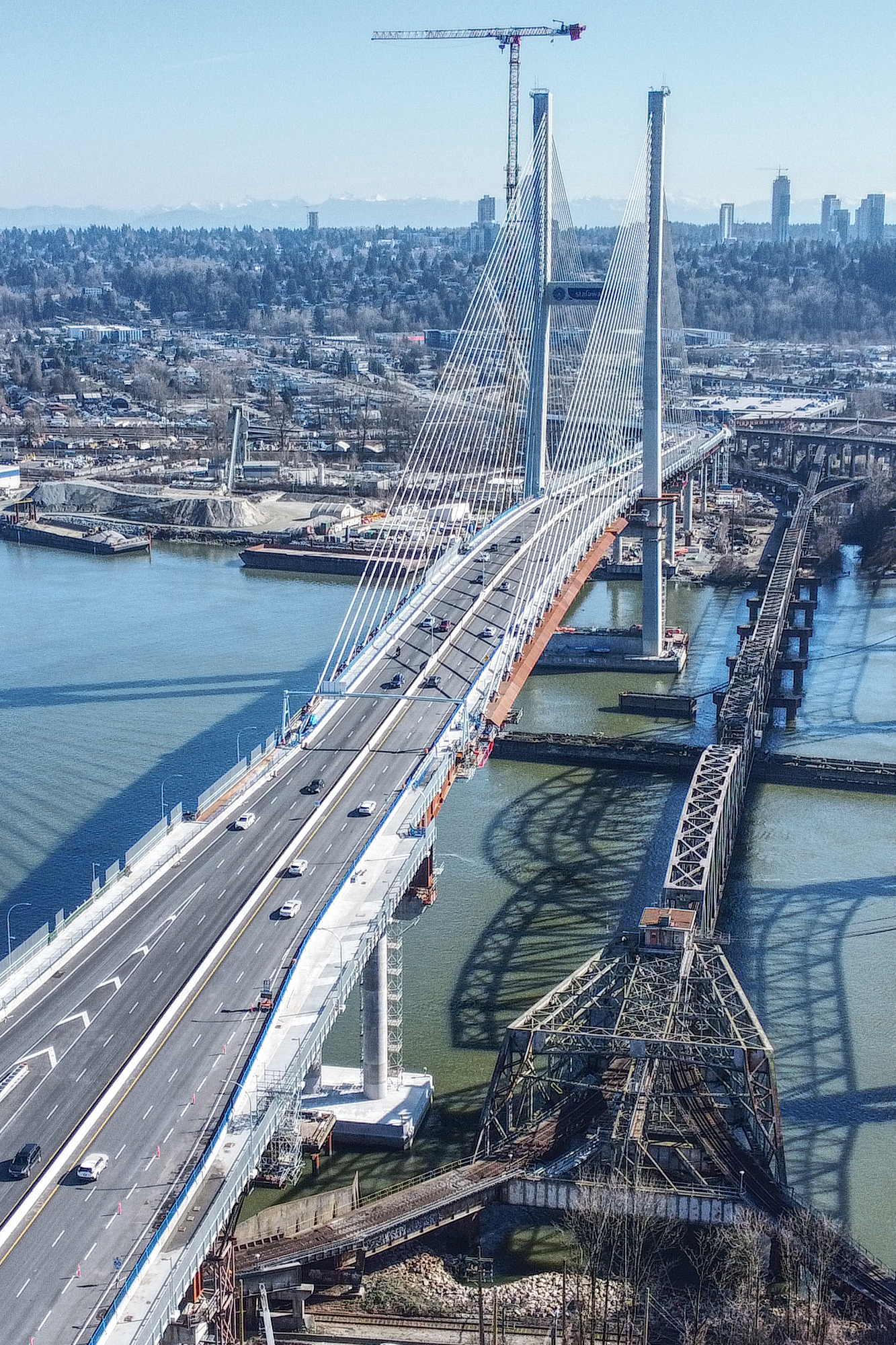
- Eastern view in March 2026
- Coordinates: 49°12′29″N 122°53′33″W
- Carries: Four lanes of British Columbia Highway 1A/99A, pedestrians and bicycles
- Crosses: Fraser River
- Locale: New Westminster; Surrey
- Owner: British Columbia Ministry of Transportation and Infrastructure

Characteristics
- Design: Cable-stayed bridge
- Total length: 1,235 metres (4,052 ft)
- Height: 167 metres (548 ft)
- Longest span: 332 metres (1,089 ft)

History
- Constructed by: Acciona, Aecon, Leonhardt, Andrä and Partner, Hatch Ltd, EXP Services
- Construction start: February 2021
- Construction cost: $1.637 billion (estimated)
- Opened: December 24, 2025 (1 northbound lane); February 14, 2026 (all lanes)
- Replaces: Pattullo Bridge

Location
- Interactive map of stal̕əw̓asəm Bridge; Riverview Bridge

The stal̕əw̓asəm Bridge (/ˌstɑːloʊˈɑːsəm/ stah-loh-AH-səm; Halkomelem: [stɑlˀəwˀˈɑːsəm]), also known as the Riverview Bridge, is a cable-stayed bridge spanning the Fraser River. The crossing officially opened on February 14, 2026, and links the cities of New Westminster and Surrey in Metro Vancouver. Prior to its official opening, one northbound lane of the bridge was opened to vehicle traffic in 2025 in order to fulfill a commitment made by the provincial government. The bridge received its Halkomelem name from the Kwantlen First Nation and Musqueam Indian Band. Road signage includes both its Halkomelem and English name.

The cable-stayed bridge replaced the through arch Pattullo Bridge, which spanned the Fraser River from 1937 to 2026.

== History ==
=== Background ===
On July 31, 2008, TransLink opted to replace the Pattullo Bridge as a new tolled bridge rather than refurbish the aging structure. A key link between Surrey and the rest of Metro Vancouver, the Pattullo Bridge carried an average of 75,700 cars and 3,840 trucks daily in 2013, representing about 20% of Fraser River vehicle traffic. The Pattullo Bridge had a number of issues, including not being seismically sound, having narrow lanes, and lacking barriers separating opposing traffic or pedestrians and cyclists. This created the need for a replacement.

In June 2014, the Metro Vancouver Mayors' Council determined that the existing Pattullo Bridge would be demolished and replaced with a new, four-lane, tolled replacement bridge. Construction was expected to take place between 2019 and 2023, with the $1.3 billion funding finalized in 2018. It was later decided not to have tolls for the bridge.

On January 3, 2020, the government of British Columbia awarded a contract to Fraser Crossing Partners – a joint venture between Acciona Infrastructure Canada and Aecon Group – to design and construct the new bridge. The contract also included new road connections at the bridgeheads in New Westminster and Surrey.

=== Construction ===
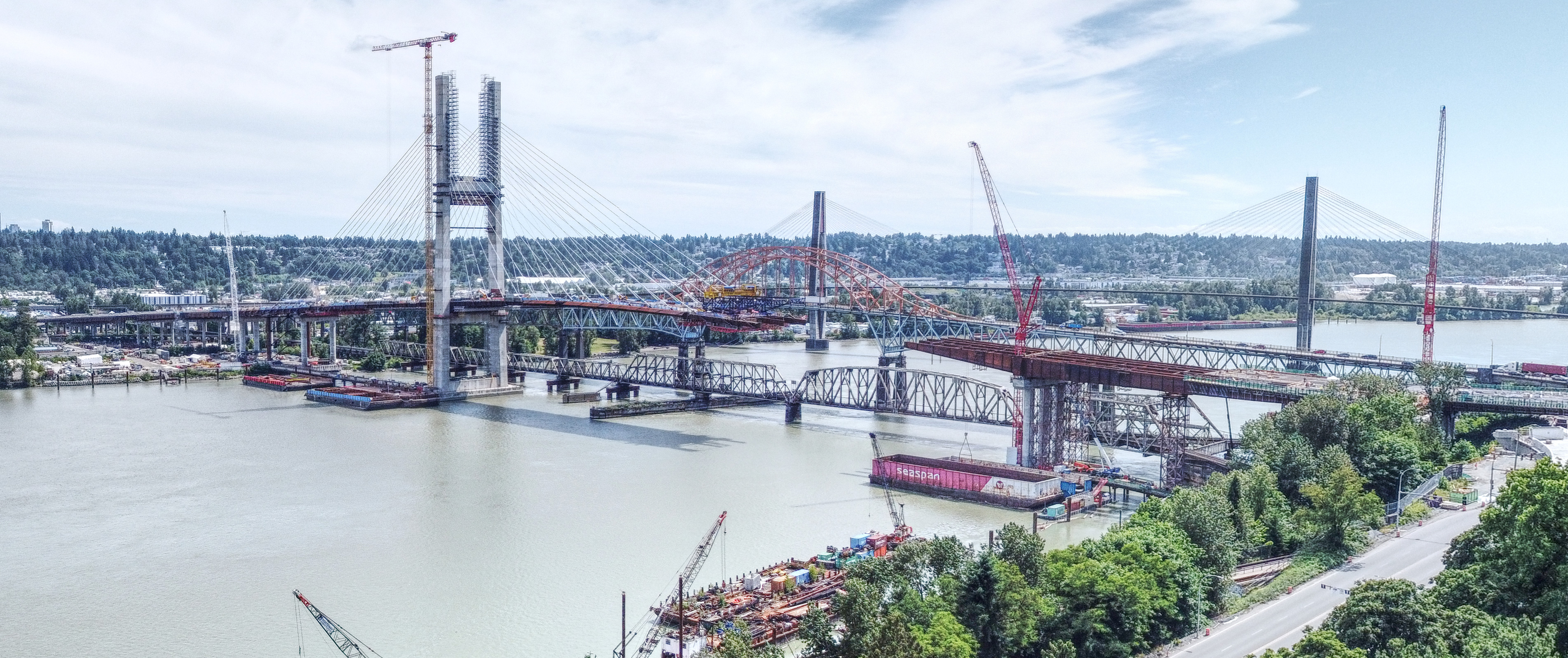
Construction nearing the final span in July 2025

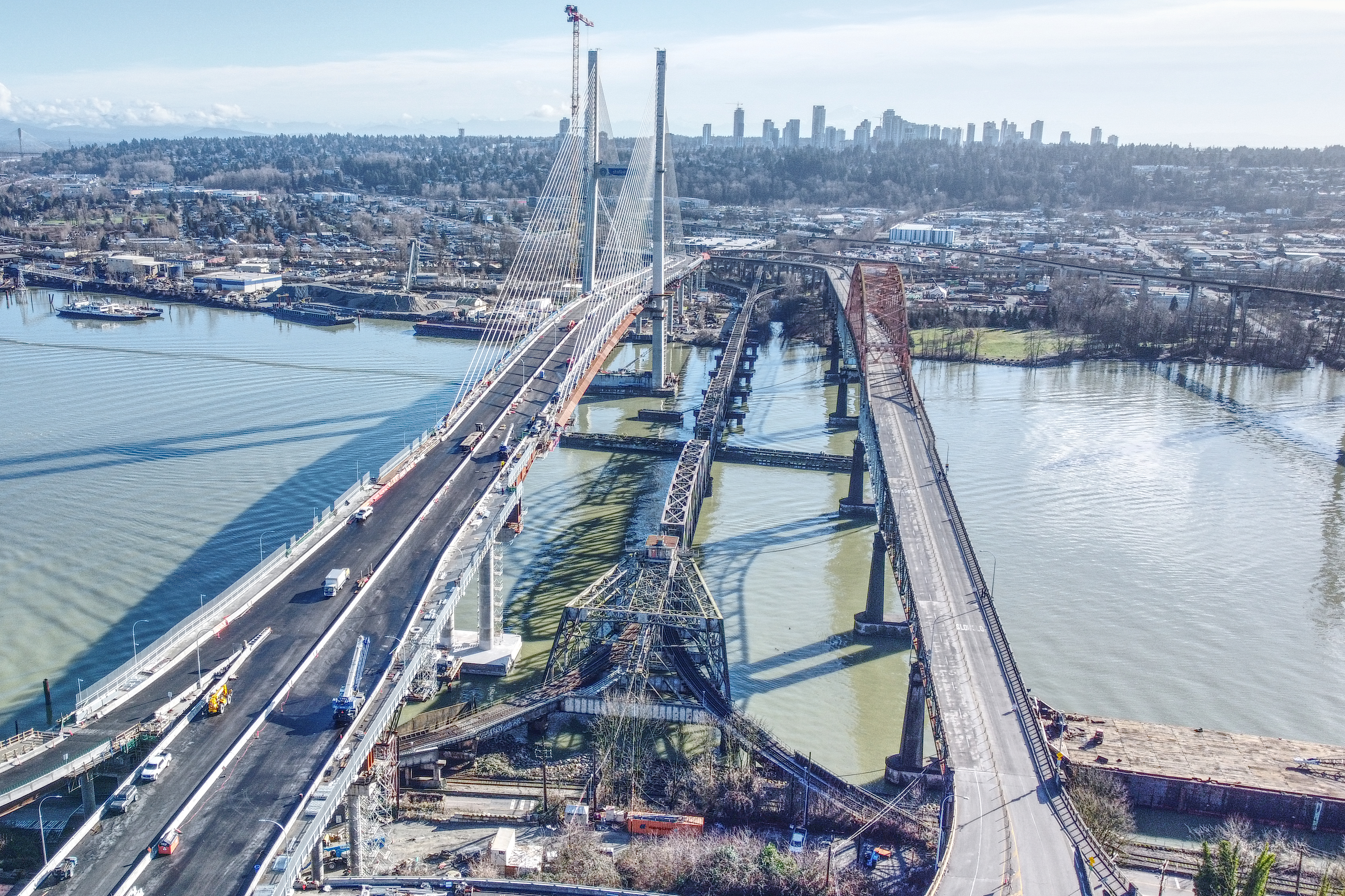
Pattullo Bridge and the stal̕əw̓asəm Bridge closed to traffic in February 2026

In February 2021, construction began on the replacement bridge with an expected opening in 2024. This work was temporarily suspended to protect fish habitat. In 2024, the opening date was pushed back to late 2025.

In the second quarter of 2025, the main span was successfully connected to the south approach, creating a continuous deck into Surrey. By mid-2025, crews were installing barriers, utilities, and expansion joints, with paving scheduled for later in the third quarter.

In September 2025, Wendy Itagawa, the executive director of the project, told Surrey City Council that the bridge would open in December 2025. Itagawa stated there would be a week where neither the Pattullo Bridge or its replacement would be open to traffic. One northbound lane was opened on December 24, 2025, before being closed again on January 5, 2026, for further work. A planned closure of both the old and new bridges began on February 6, 2026, and lasted a week. On February 14, 2026, all four lanes were opened instead of the planned 3 lanes.

== Design ==
The stal̕əw̓asəm Bridge is designed to carry four lanes of traffic but can be expanded to six lanes in the future. The city of New Westminster supported a four-lane design, while the city of Surrey supported six lanes.

The bridge features First Nations artwork, and artwork will also be installed near the bridge approaches. The first artwork to be installed was a design by Kwantlen First Nation artist q̓ʷɑt̓ic̓ɑ (Phyllis Atkins) embossed into the Highway 17–Old Yale Road overpass.

== See also ==
- List of crossings of the Fraser River
- List of bridges in Canada
