= Marine diesel oil =

Type of distillate diesel oil

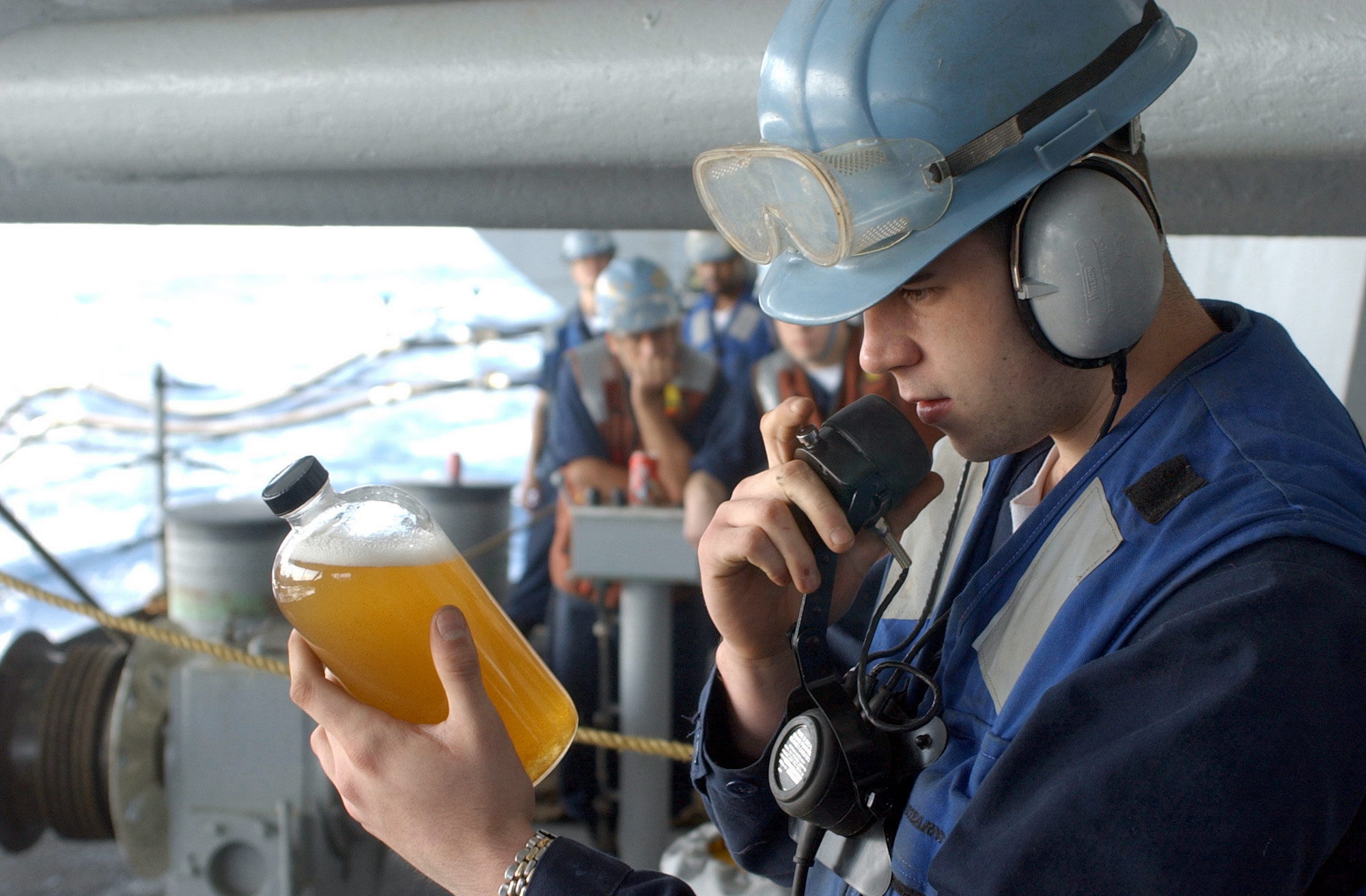

Marine diesel oil (MDO) is a type of distillate diesel oil. Marine diesel oil is also called distillate marine diesel. MDO is widely used as motor fuel by medium speed and medium/high speed marine diesel engines. It is also used in the larger low speed and medium speed propulsion engine which normally burn residual fuel. Those fuels result from a catalytic cracking and visbreaking refinery. Marine diesel oil has been condemned for its high sulfur content, so many countries and organizations established regulations and laws on MDO use. Due to its lower price compared to more refined fuel, MDO is favored particularly by the shipping industry.

== Specification ==
ISO 8217 of the International Standards Organization (ISO) is the primary standard of MDO.

Marine fuels range in viscosity from less than one centistoke (cSt) to about 700 cSt at 50°C (122°F). (1 cSt = 1 mm2/s.) And higher viscosity grades are preheated during use to bring their viscosity into the range suitable for fuel injection (8 to 27 cSt). But MDO does not need to be preheated before using. According to Chevron, MDO has a sulfur limit varies from 1 to 4.5 percent by mass for different grades and Sulfur Emission Control Areas (SECAs).

== Manufacturing procedure ==
MDO is made from a catalytic cracking and visbreaking refinery. The catalytic cracking operation breaks large molecules into small molecules. It happens in high temperature and with appropriate catalyst. Visbreaking is a process that turn the bottom product of the vacuum unit, which has extremely high viscosity, into lower viscosity, marketable product. In visbreaking, a relatively mild thermal cracking operation is performed. And the amount of cracking is limited by the overruling requirement to safeguard the heavy fuel stability.

== Use ==
The market of MDO is much smaller than on-highway diesel. According to the 2004 US diesel fuel sales statistics from US Department of Energy, Energy Information Administration, marine shipping only makes up 3.7% of the total diesel market. On the other hand, on-highway diesel makes up 59.5% of diesel fuel sales. This small sales share of MDO is due to the high proportion of petroleum resid that made it can be used on large marine engines. According to Chevron, petroleum resid, or inorganic salts, in the fuel result in injector tip deposits that prevent the injector from creating the desired fuel spray pattern. But those low-speed, large marine diesel engines are appropriate for using fuel containing large amounts of petroleum resid.

== Regulations and restrictions ==
The International Maritime Organization (IMO) develops regulations for marine shipping. Among those regulations, MARPOL (the International Convention for the Prevention of Pollution from Ships) is the most widely adopted one. MARPOL is the main international convention covering the prevention of operational or accidental pollution of the marine environment by ships. Inside the IMO, there is a committee called the Marine Environment Protection Committee (MEPC). The MEPC decided on January 1st 2025 to implement the Fuel EU programm, planning to reduce Co2 emissions for marine transport. The MEPC has meetings periodically to discusses resolutions to current marine pollution.
