= Tsawwassen ferry terminal =

Ferry terminal in British Columbia, Canada

Tsawwassen
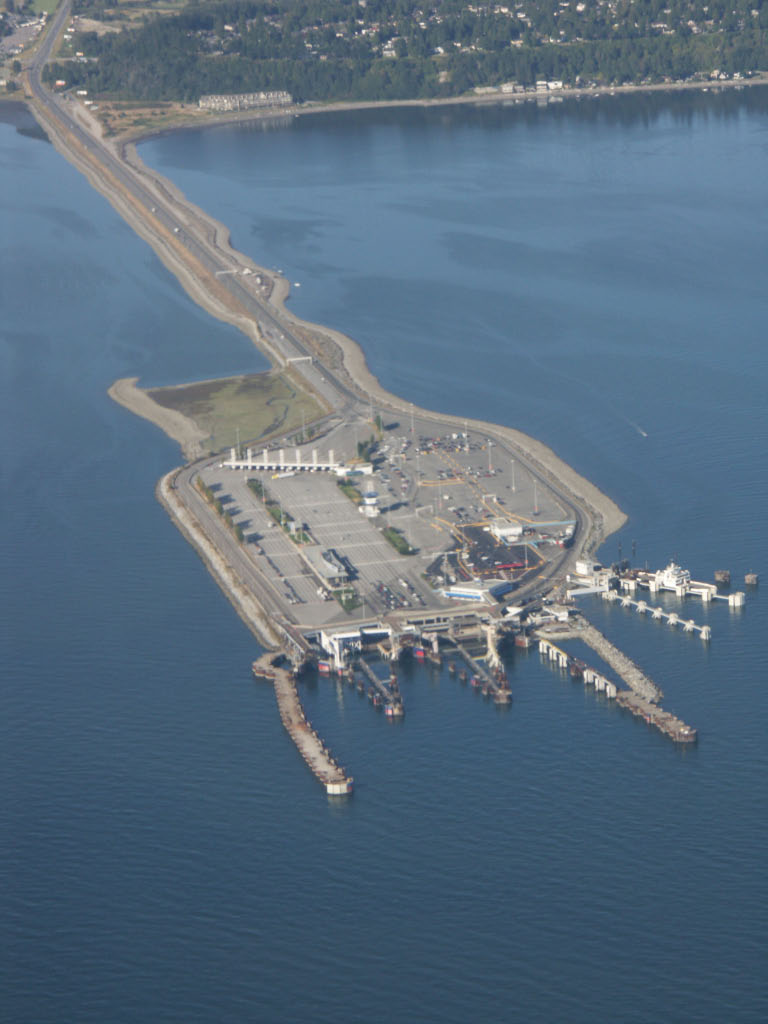
- Tsawwassen ferry terminal from the air

General information
- Location: 1 Ferry Causeway; Delta, British Columbia; Canada
- Coordinates: 49.0087°N 123.1289°W
- System: Ferry terminal
- Owner: BC Ferries
- Operator: BC Ferries
- Lines: Route 1–Swartz Bay; Route 9–Southern Gulf Islands; Route 30–Duke Point
- Bus stands: 2
- Bus operators: Coast Mountain Bus Company
- Connections: TransLink buses: 620 Bridgeport Station

Construction
- Parking: 168 short-term spaces; 716 long-term spaces
- Accessible: yes

Other information
- Station code: TSA
- Website: www.bcferries.com/travel-boarding/terminal-directions-parking-food/vancouver-tsawwassen/TSA

History
- Opened: June 15, 1960

Passengers
- 2024: 4 603 980 (Note: Figures obtained for 2023 & 2024 from adding the passengers counted at Tsawwassen from routes 1, 9, and 30 in each month of the calendar year. The figures under "Total Prev Year" are not used because those denote fiscal years instead of calendar years. The total passenger count at Tsawwassen for 2023 was 4 516 501.) ▲1.94%
Location

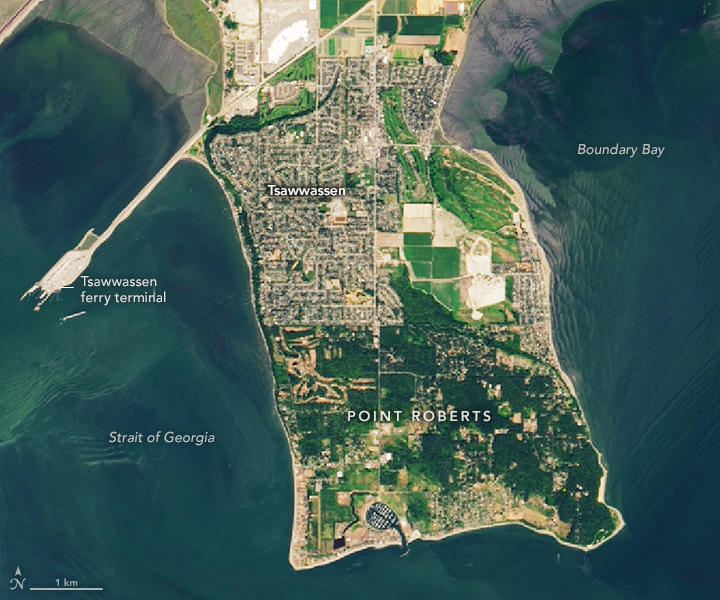
Satellite image of Tsawwassen ferry terminal

Tsawwassen (English: /təˈwɑːsən/; Halkomelem: sc̓əwaθən) is a ferry terminal and a major transportation facility in Delta, British Columbia, part of the BC Ferries system and Highway 17. Positioned less than 500 metres (1,600 ft) from the 49th parallel along the Canada–United States border, the terminal sits at the southwestern end of a 2-kilometre (1.2 mi) causeway that juts out into the Strait of Georgia off the mainland at the community of Tsawwassen. With an approximate size of 23 hectares (57 acres), it is the largest ferry terminal in North America.

== History ==
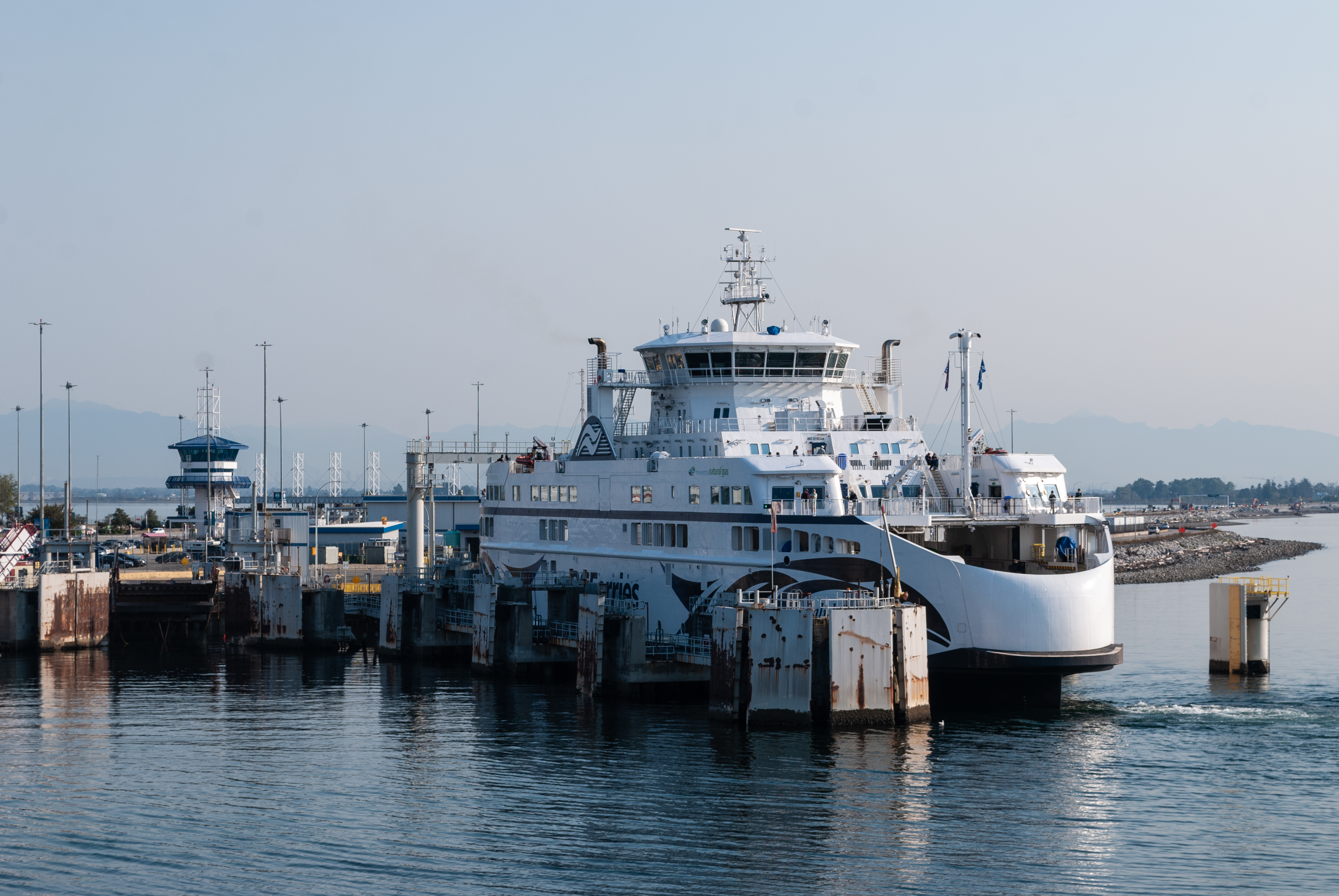
BC Ferries vessel, Salish Raven, loading passengers and cars at the Tsawwassen terminal

In the late 1950s, the search for a mainland ferry terminal that would connect British Columbia's Lower Mainland with the Victoria area on Vancouver Island involved extensive scouting of locations, from Steveston to White Rock. Despite concerns of rough seas and bad weather, the favoured site soon became the area offshore from the Tsawwassen First Nation reserve.

Construction of the terminal began in 1959, after BC Transportation Minister Phil Gaglardi, on divided engineering advice, selected the site. Construction of an artificial island began, and the causeway was built from the island back towards the mainland. The endeavour used an estimated 2.3 million cubic metres (3.0 million cubic yards) of boulder, rock, and gravel fill.

To connect Highway 99 to the new terminal, an 11-kilometre-long (6.8 mi) highway was constructed near the southern end of the Deas Tunnel and through the edge of Ladner and became a portion of Highway 17. The terminal opened on June 15, 1960.

In the mid-1990s, a major renovation and expansion of the terminal was undertaken.

=== Issues ===
The isolated causeway location of the terminal was criticized locally in its formative years. In 2003, the Tsawwassen First Nation filed legal action in the BC Supreme Court over the destruction of the foreshore and other concerns caused by the impact of the terminal and the nearby Roberts Bank Superport. Concerns were also expressed in 2005 about eutrophication, or destructive bacterial buildup, in the waters between the terminal and the Roberts Bank facility.

== Ferry facilities and connections ==
Currently, there are five berths at the Tsawwassen ferry terminal. The terminal primarily serves routes travelling to the Swartz Bay ferry terminal, north of Victoria, and the southern Gulf Islands.

On May 1, 1990, a connection from Tsawwassen to Nanaimo called the "Mid-Island Express" was established, providing the fastest surface connection between Northern Vancouver Island and the border with the United States at Blaine, and, since the opening of the South Fraser Perimeter Road, to the Fraser Valley and points east. The route ran to Departure Bay until 1997, when the Duke Point ferry terminal opened.

The quickest path between the terminal and Active Pass, for ferries travelling to the Gulf Islands or to Swartz Bay, passes over approximately 8 km (5 mi) of United States waters in the Strait of Georgia.

The terminal is served by public transportation through TransLink's 620 bus route.

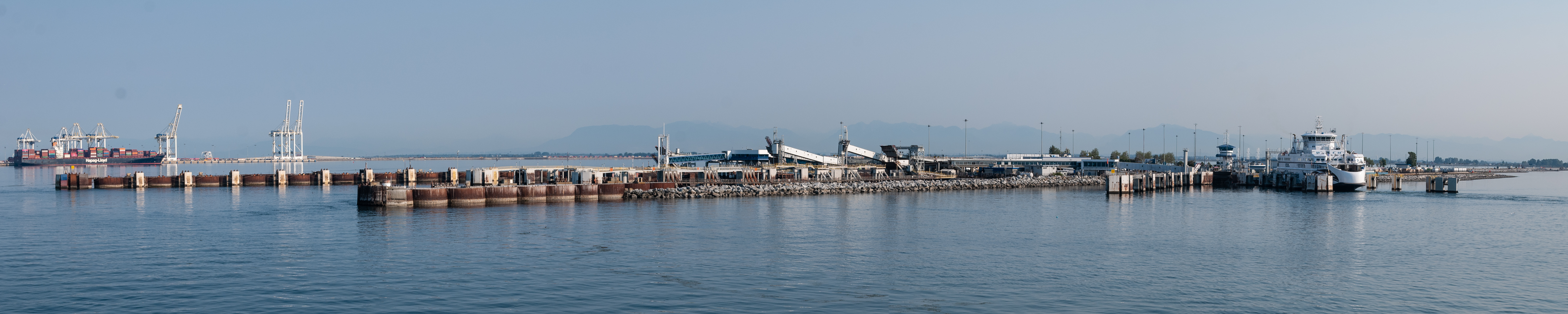
BC Ferries' Tsawwassen terminal, with Roberts Bank Superport at back left

== See also ==
- Duke Point ferry terminal
- Departure Bay ferry terminal
- Horseshoe Bay ferry terminal
- Earls Cove ferry terminal
- Roberts Bank
- Roberts Bank Superport
