= Swartz Bay ferry terminal =

Ferry terminal in British Columbia, Canada

Swartz Bay
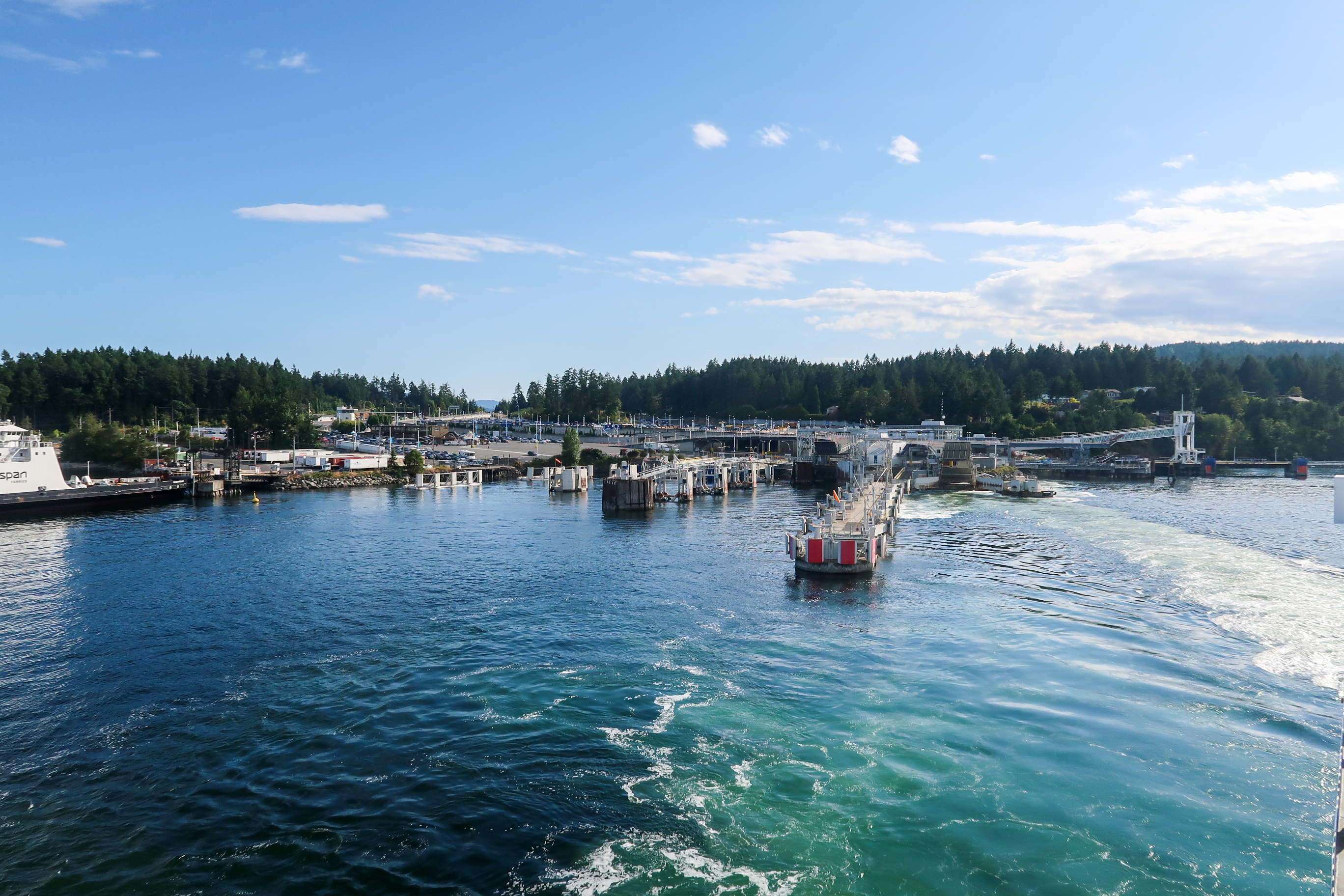

General information
- Location: 11300 Patricia Bay Highway; Sidney, British Columbia; Canada
- Coordinates: 48.688184°N 123.4101963°W
- System: Ferry terminal
- Owner: BC Ferries
- Operator: BC Ferries
- Lines: Route 1–Tsawwassen; Route 4–Fulford Harbour; Route 5–Southern Gulf Islands
- Bus routes: 5
- Connections: Victoria Regional: 70 Downtown Express; 71 Downtown via West Sidney; 72 Downtown via Fifth; 76 UVic; 81 Brentwood

Construction
- Parking: 172 short-term spaces 544 long-term spaces
- Accessible: yes

Other information
- Station code: SWB
- Website: www.bcferries.com/travel-boarding/terminal-directions-parking-food/victoria-swartz-bay/SWB

History
- Opened: June 15, 1960
- Original company: Gulf Islands Ferry Company

Key dates
- 1961: Acquired by BC Ferries

Passengers
- 2024: 3 780 567 (Note: Figures obtained for 2023 & 2024 from adding the passengers counted at Swartz Bay from the routes 1, 4, and 5 in each month of the calendar year. The figures under "Total Prev Year" are not used because those denote fiscal years instead of calendar years. The total passenger count at Swartz Bay for 2023 is 3 704 227.) ▲2.06%
Location

Swartz Bay is a 22.7 ha (56.1-acre) ferry terminal and a major transportation facility at Swartz Bay in North Saanich, British Columbia. It is located 32 km (20 mi) north of Victoria on Vancouver Island. The terminal is part of the BC Ferries system, as well as part of Highway 17.

== History ==
In 1889, former British Columbia premier Amor De Cosmos was the first person who is known to have suggested Swartz Bay publicly as a feasible ferry terminal for connections to the Lower Mainland. In 1959, the search for a new ferry terminal north of Victoria involved consideration of the existing San Juan Islands ferry facilities at Sidney. Insufficiently-sheltered waters and added travel time, leading to higher fuel costs, precluded Sidney from being selected.

A small private ferry dock operated by the Gulf Islands Ferry Company already existed at Swartz Bay when the choice was made to locate the BC Ferry Corporation terminal there. As a result of the decision, a paved extension of the Patricia Bay Highway to reach the terminal was undertaken.

The first scheduled sailing from the terminal, described as a "mudhole" because of the continuing construction, occurred on June 15, 1960. On September 1, 1961, the company that built and used the smaller original dock at Swartz Bay was bought out by BC Ferries.

In the SENĆOŦEN language spoken by Indigenous W̱SÁNEĆ people of the area, the bay's name is ŚJEL¸KES.

== Accidents and incidents ==
A fire, caused by a cutting torch, led to $500,000 worth of damage to the terminal in December 1981. It destroyed part of the passenger walkway and a wingwall, prior to being contained by terminal staff, firefighters and the approaching Queen of Nanaimo, which utilized its hoses to help keep the blaze at bay.

Residents have expressed noise concerns over the years, and the matter has been raised in the Legislative Assembly. Concerns have also been expressed ranging from terminal expansion to the shooting of pigeons by ferry staff.

On September 14, 2000, the ferry Spirit of Vancouver Island struck a pleasure craft just off Swartz Bay, killing two individuals.

On May 20, 2011, a truck waiting in line drove up the upper ramp of the terminal's first berth and then through several guard barriers and safety netting at an increased speed. The truck then proceeded to drive off the end of the berth at a high speed and into the water. Later the same day, divers located the truck and deceased driver in the water off the end of the berth, identifying him later that week.

== Ferry facilities and connections ==
Currently, there are five ferry berths at the Swartz Bay ferry terminal. Completed in 2006, the Swartz Bay Berth 2 project involved the replacement of the old marine structures and counter-weighted ramp lift system with a $25 million state-of-the-art floating berth. The terminal provides BC Ferries service to the Tsawwassen ferry terminal on the mainland, as well as all the major southern Gulf Islands. In the mid-1990s, a major terminal renovation was undertaken. The Seaspan Ferries Corporation also has a terminal here.

The terminal includes an administration building, and various kiosks run by local artisans and other vendors mainly in the warmer months. There is also a cafeteria and coffee shop in the main building. A gate was proposed in 2018. The cafe was renovated in 2023.

The terminal is served by several Victoria Regional Transit System public transit routes, with Route 70 providing express bus service to and from downtown Victoria in about an hour. Short and long-term pay parking is run by a private operator under contract to BC Ferries. The terminal is located about 10 minutes from Victoria International Airport via Highway 17. The 29-kilometre (18 mi) Lochside Regional Trail also runs south from Swartz Bay to Victoria.

Swartz Bay is the only major southern terminal in the BC Ferries system without a traffic signal at its entrance or exit.

== Gallery ==
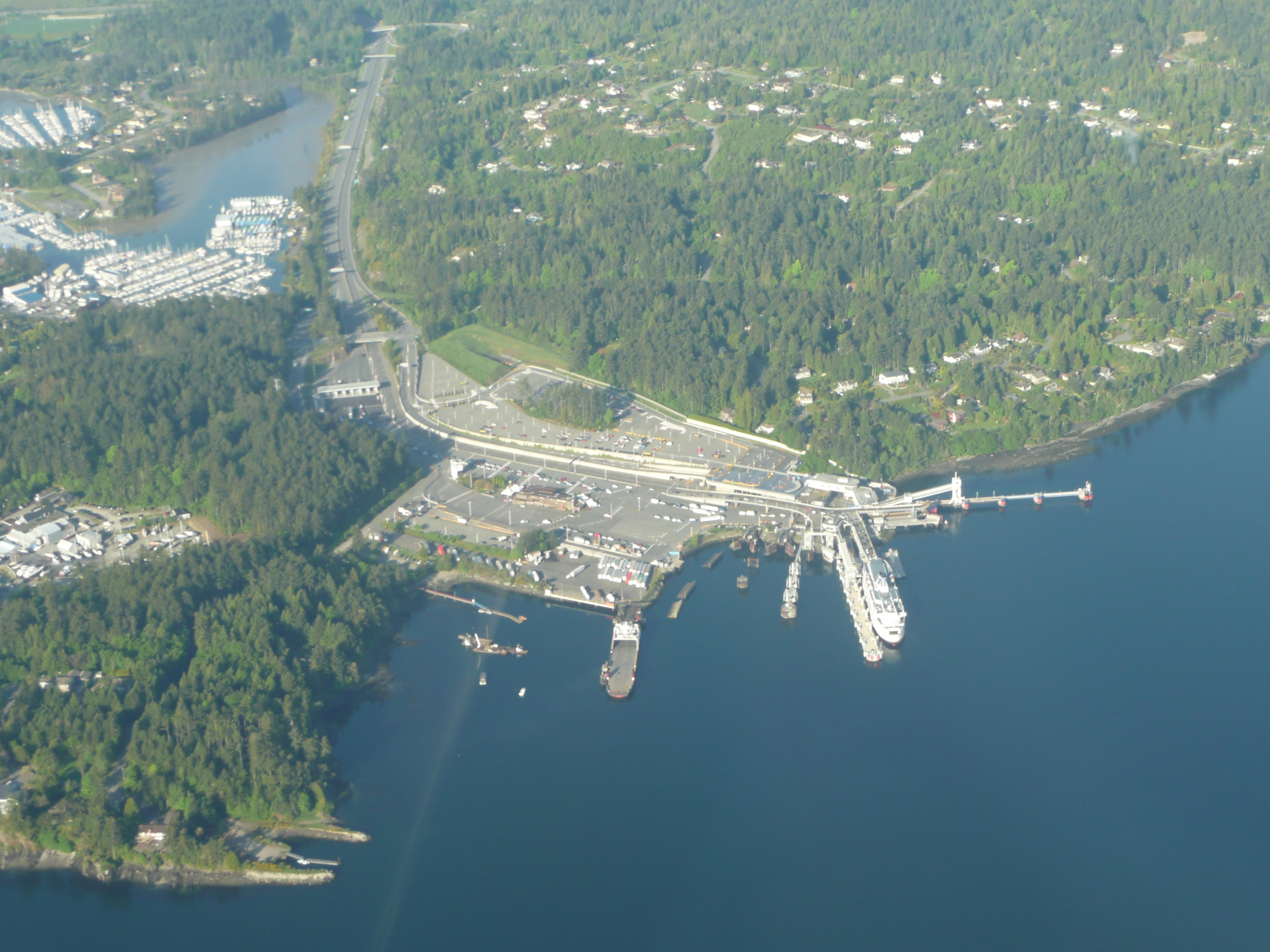
Aerial view of Swartz Bay ferry terminal

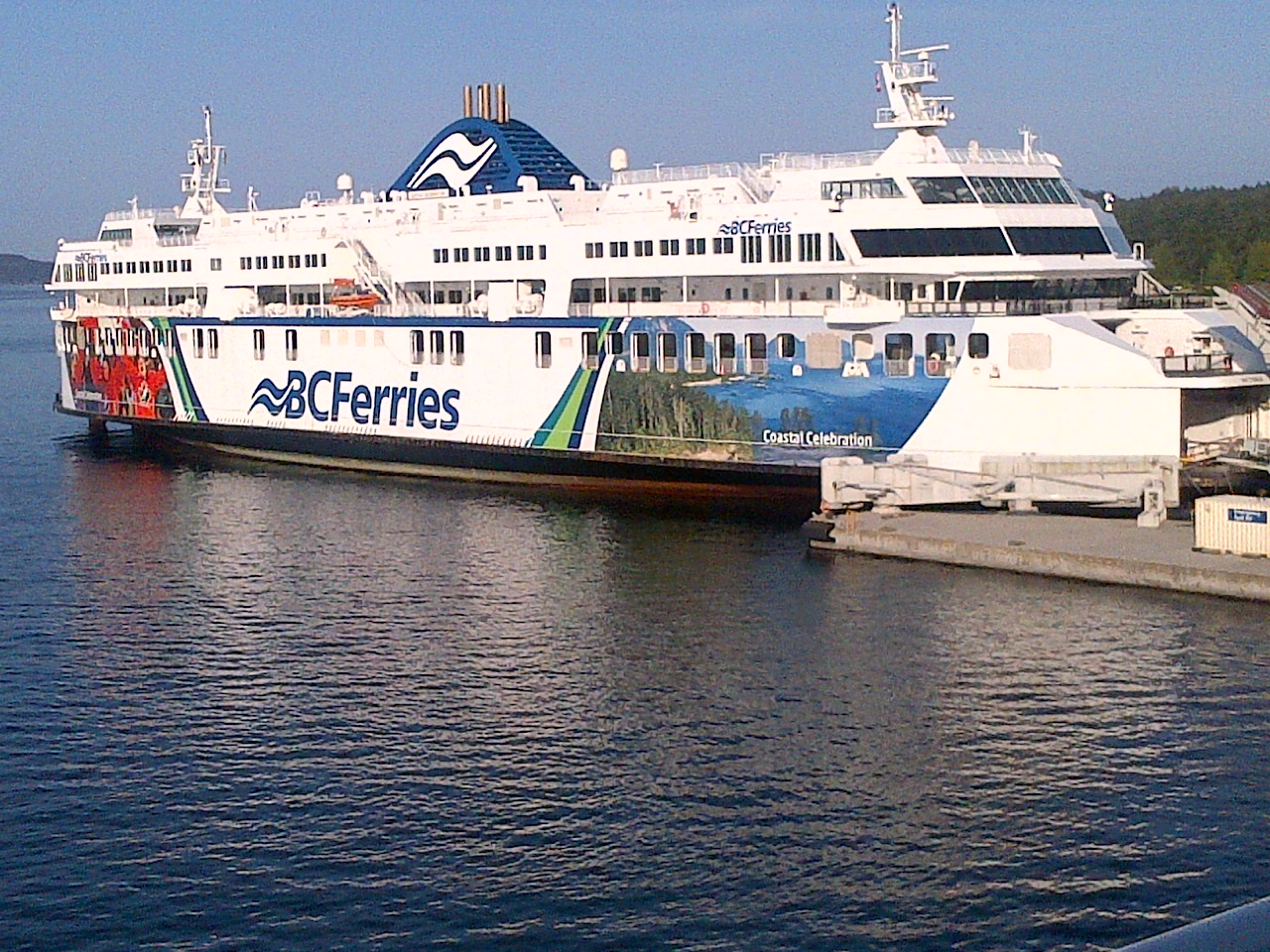
BC Ferries' Coastal Celebration docked at Swartz Bay terminal in May 2014

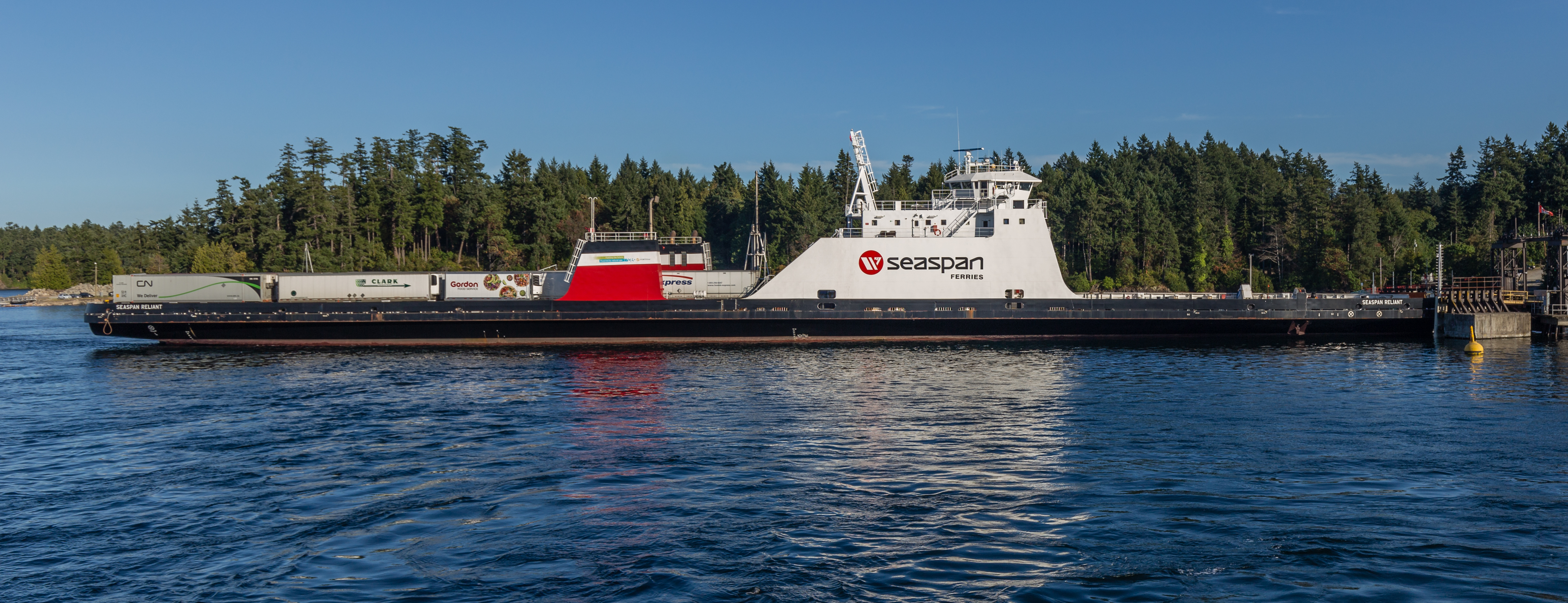
Seaspan Reliant at the Swartz Bay ferry terminal on 13 July 2018

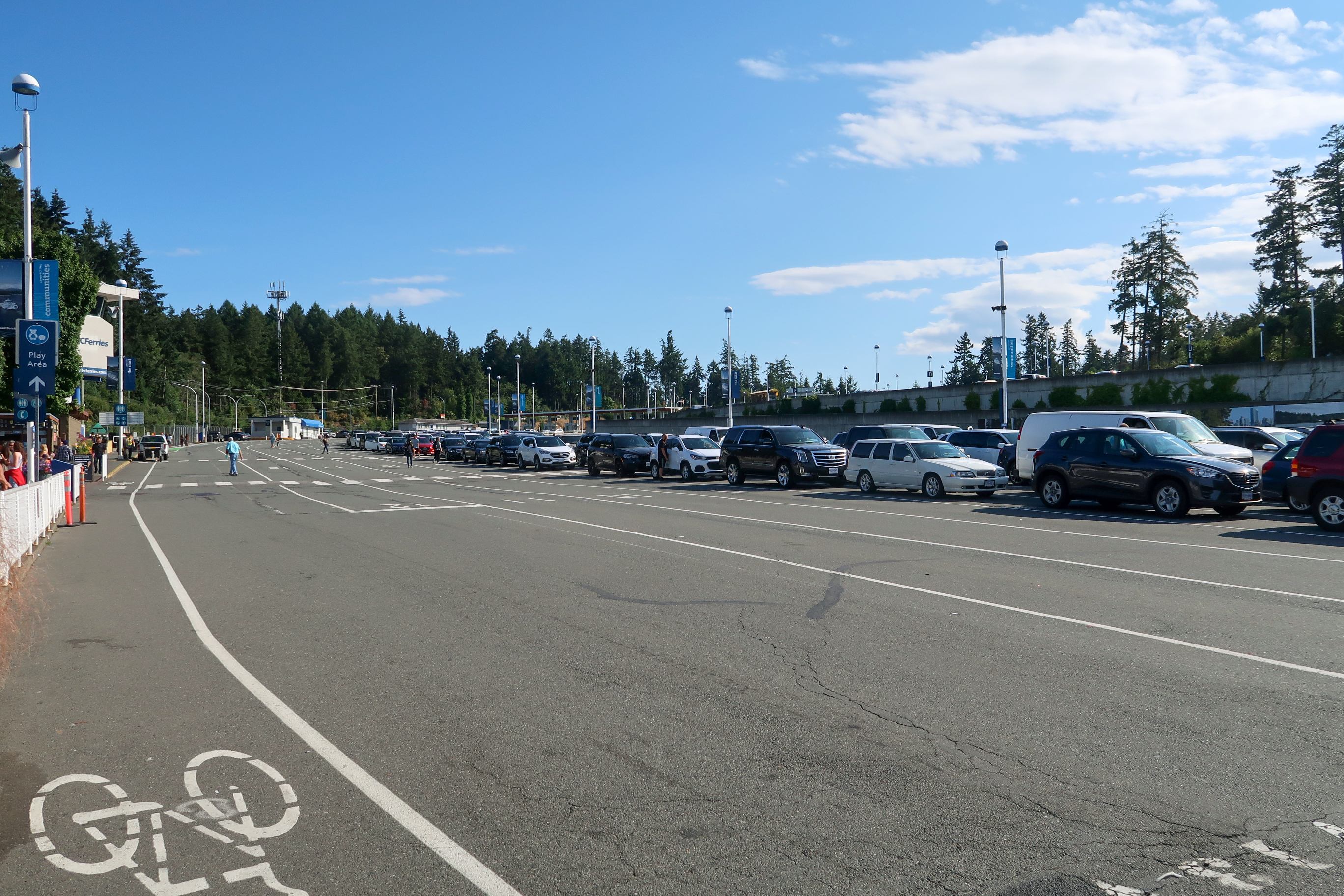
Parking area

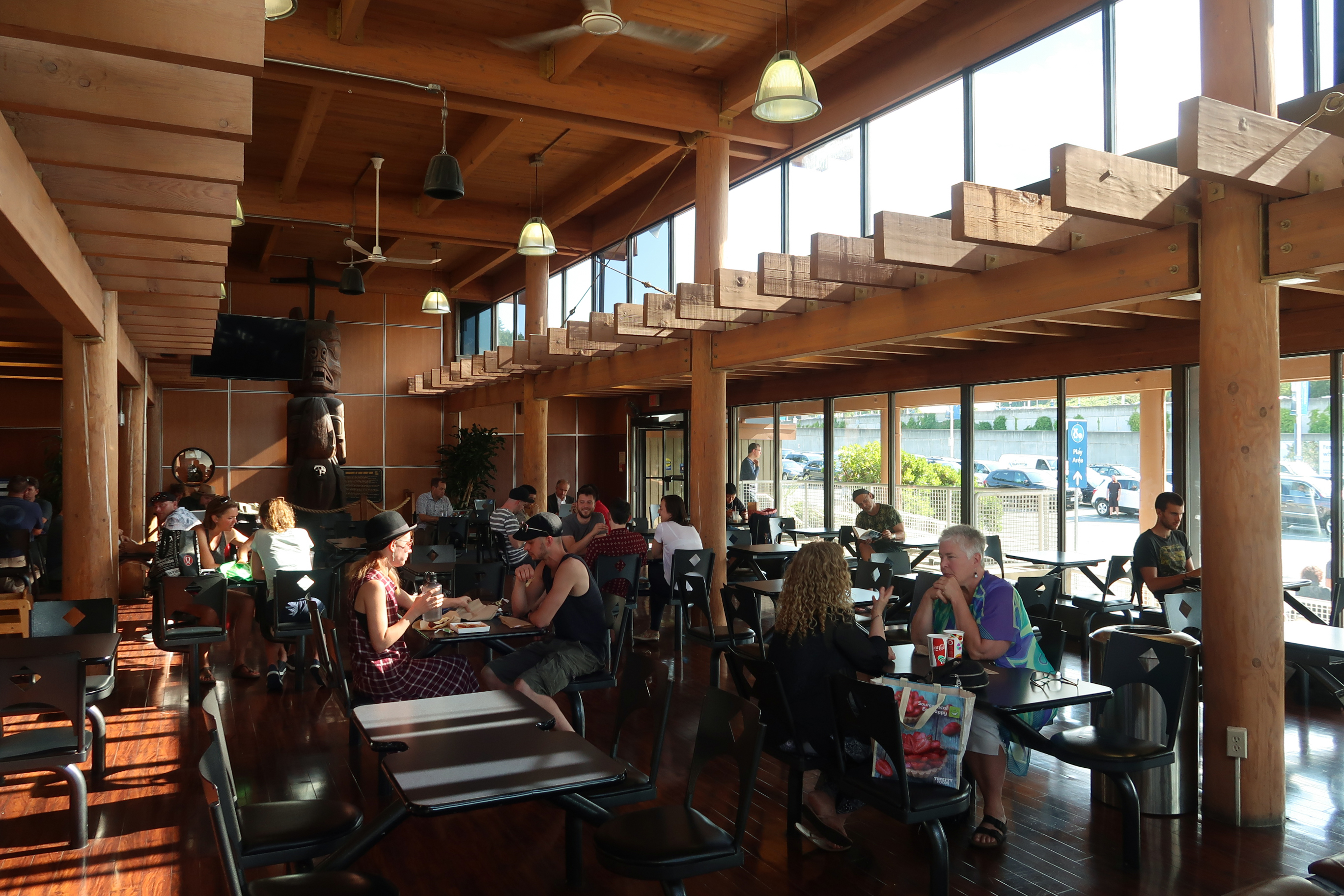
Lands End Café
