= Swartz Bay =

Bay in British Columbia, Canada

Coordinates: 48°41′14.22″N 123°24′35.92″W

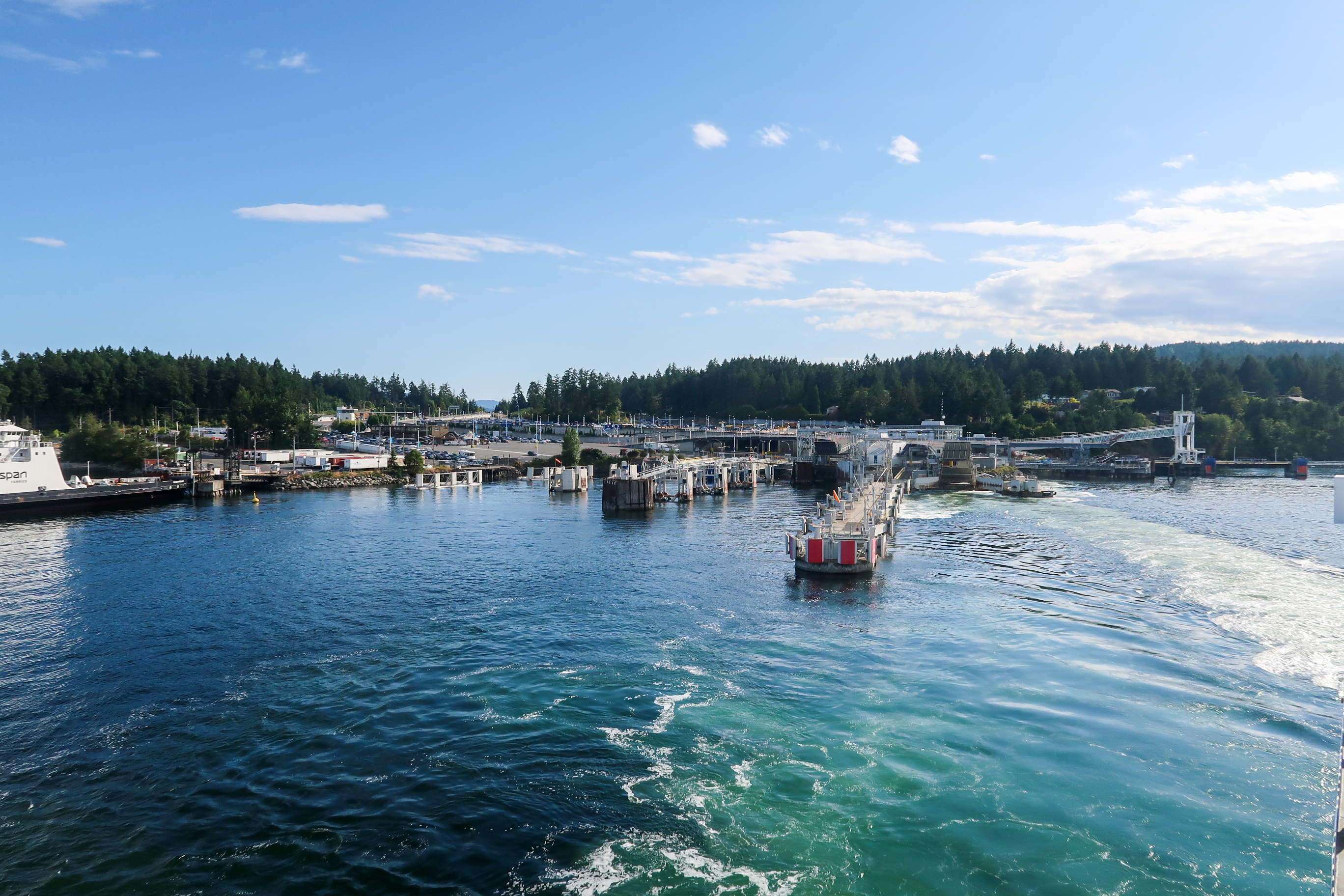
Swartz Bay Ferry Terminal

Swartz Bay, located on the north end of the Saanich Peninsula on Vancouver Island, is primarily known for being the location of one of BC Ferries' main terminals, the Swartz Bay Ferry Terminal. Swartz Bay was named after John Aaron Swart, purchaser in 1876 - i.e. it was meant to be Swart's Bay, but was incorrectly spelled when it was adopted by the Government. In the SENĆOŦEN language spoken by Indigenous W̱SÁNEĆ people of the area, its name is ŚJEL¸KES.
