= San Francisco Mint =

- United States Mint (San Francisco)
- U.S. National Register of Historic Places
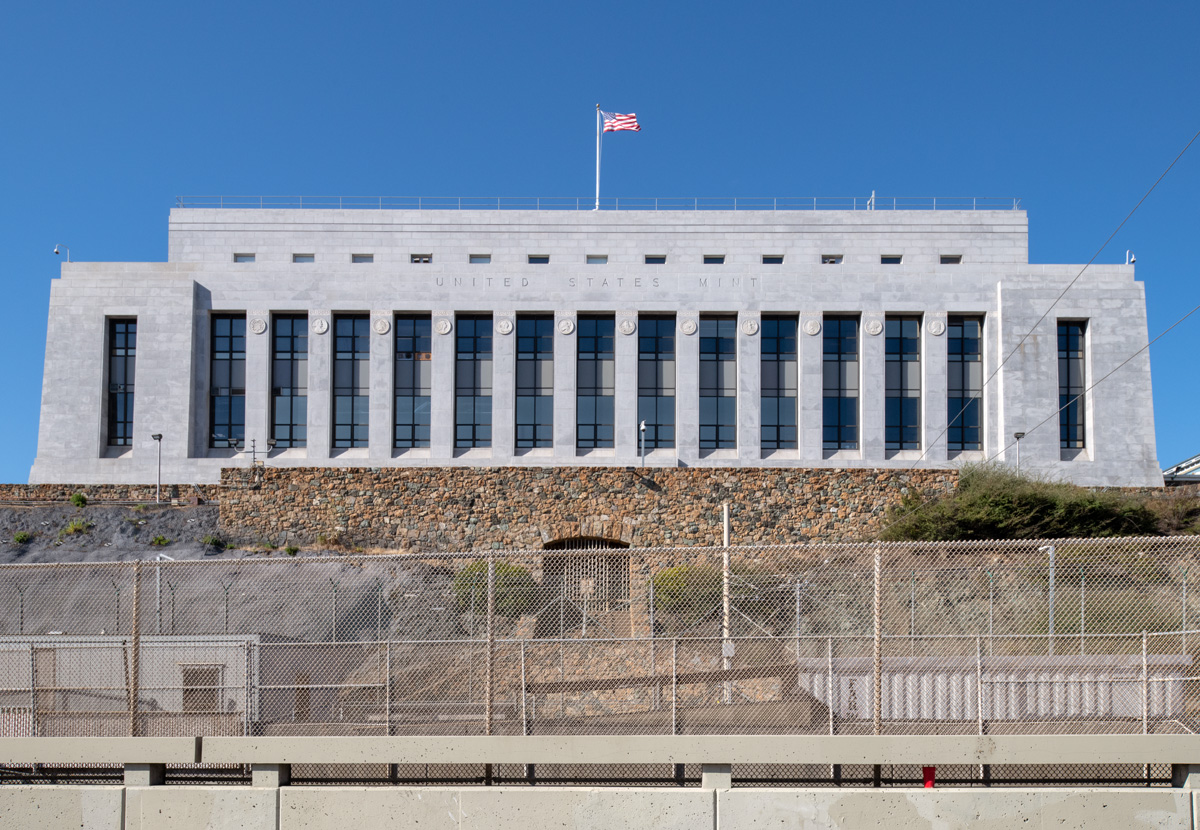
- The San Francisco Mint building, built in 1937

- Location within San Francisco County Location within California Location within the United States
- Location: Hermann and Buchanan Streets, San Francisco, California
- Coordinates: 37.7701°N 122.4273°W
- Built: 1937
- Architect: Gilbert Stanley Underwood
- Architectural style: Stripped Classicism
- NRHP reference No.: 88000026
- Added to NRHP: February 18, 1988

The San Francisco Mint is a branch of the United States Mint. Located in San Francisco, California and opened in 1854 to serve the gold mines of the California gold rush, in twenty years its operations exceeded the capacity of the first building. It moved into a new one in 1874, now known as the Old San Francisco Mint. In 1937 Mint operations moved into a third building, the current one, completed that year. Since 1955, it has primarily produced coins for numismatic purposes, though has been occasionally used for circulating issues. Coins produced at the San Francisco Mint bear the "S" mint mark.

== History ==
=== Background and establishment ===
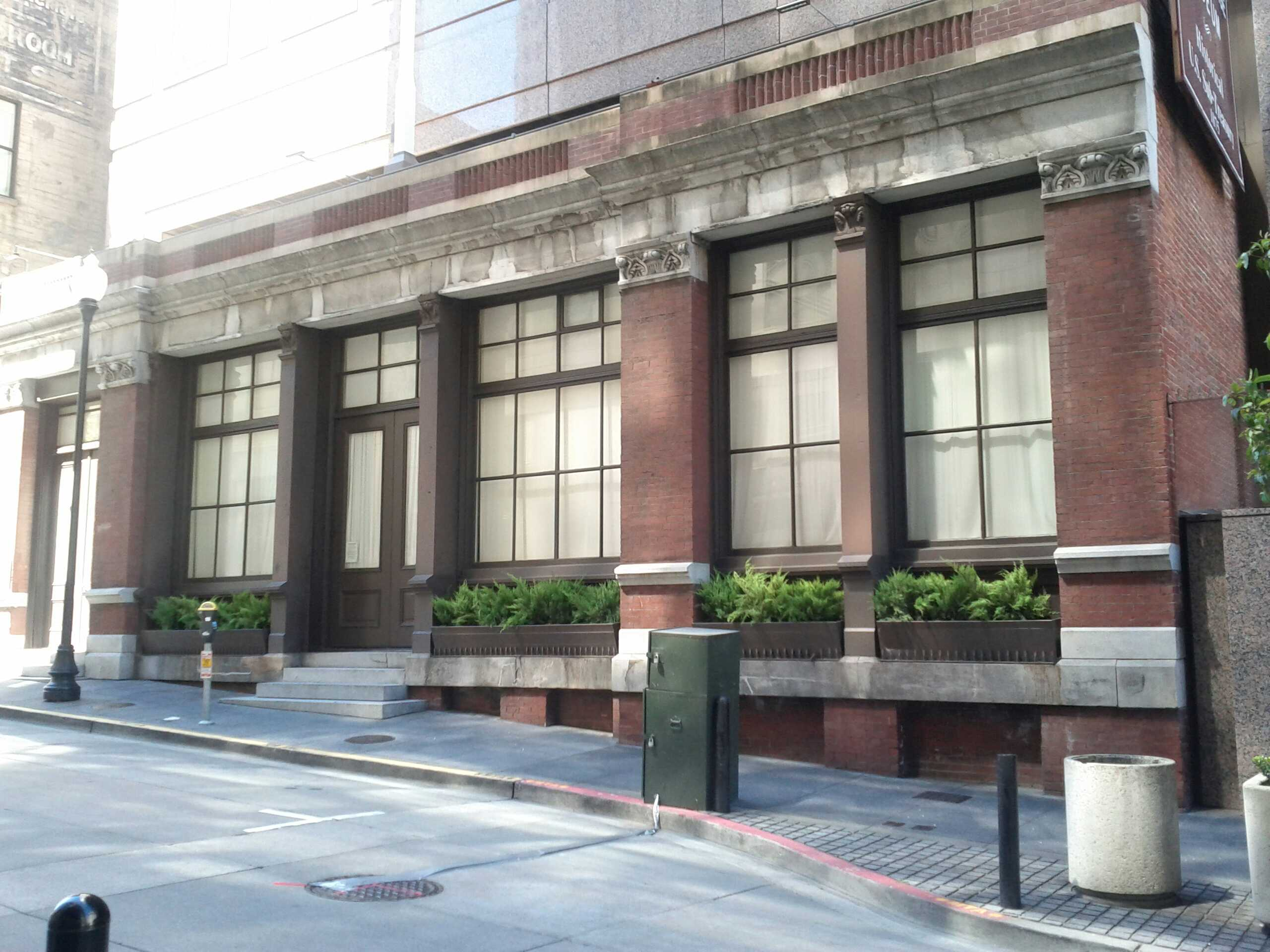
Original United States Mint and Subtreasury (1854) image from 2012

As a result of the California gold rush, demand for gold coins was high in the new state; the situation was so dire that transactions were being conducted with raw gold dust. Taxes and duties were only payable in coin, so Federal money did not stay in circulation. Californians wanted a new branch of the U.S. Mint to obviate the issue, though the Mint was reluctant to attempt new branches after its previous failures in the Dahlonega and Charlotte and other cities were vying for their own branches. As a result, U.S. Assayer Augustus Humbert received authorization to have gold ingots minted locally to placate the demand for an official currency. Several San Francisco metalworkers and jewelers had undertaken the minting of private tokens to help fill the currency vacuum, and one, Moffat & Company, was contracted to produce Humbert's $50 gold ingots. Humbert was granted further permission to issue ingots in smaller sizes, which commenced in 1852.

The bill which established the San Francisco Mint was passed on July 3, 1852. The contract to build the facility was eventually granted to the officials of Moffat & Company: Curtis, Perry, and Ward. Instead of a wholly new building, the existing Moffat & Company spaces were expanded with the company ending operations at the end of 1853.

=== Original United States Mint and Subtreasury (1854) ===
The San Francisco Mint began operations in 1854 at 608 Commercial Street, just west of Montgomery Street. The building sat between Commercial and Clay Streets. Within the first year of its operation, the San Francisco mint turned $4 million (Note: about $10.9 billion in 2025 adjusted for inflation) in gold bullion into coins. Because of the scale of its increase in operations due to economic growth, a new building was soon required.

An 1855 three-dollar piece; the "S" mint mark indicates it was struck in San Francisco Mint.

Construction of the new location approximately one mile (1.6 km) away began in 1869 at Fifth Street and Mission Street. The mint operations moved to that building in 1874.

Since June 14, 1970, the original mint building has been listed as a San Francisco Designated Landmark. A California Historical Landmark (number 87) plaque relating to the Mint can be found on Commercial Street.

=== Old San Francisco Mint (1874) ===
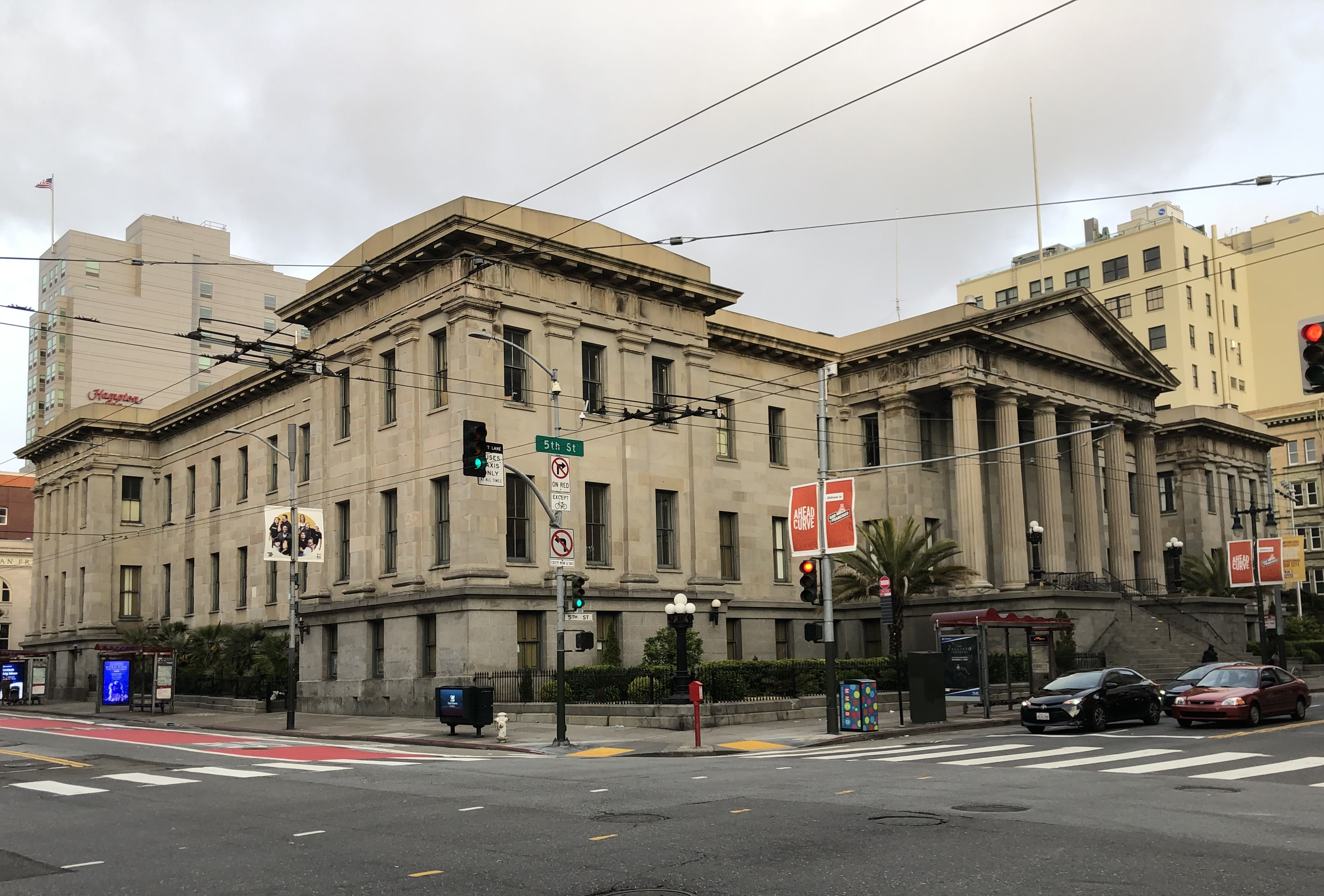
The Old San Francisco Mint, c. 2023.

The second US Mint building here, built for the Department of the Treasury, was designed by Alfred B. Mullett in a conservative Greek Revival style with a sober Doric order. The columns, most of the exterior and upper floors were constructed of sandstone. It was quarried at Newcastle Island, British Columbia, near the city of Nanaimo and imported for this purpose. Minting of coins commenced here on December 10, 1874.

In addition to domestic coinage, San Francisco additionally produced coins for other territories related to the United States. The Kingdom of Hawaii Kalākaua coinage was produced in 1883, and Philippine pesos and centavos were minted between 1903 and 1919.

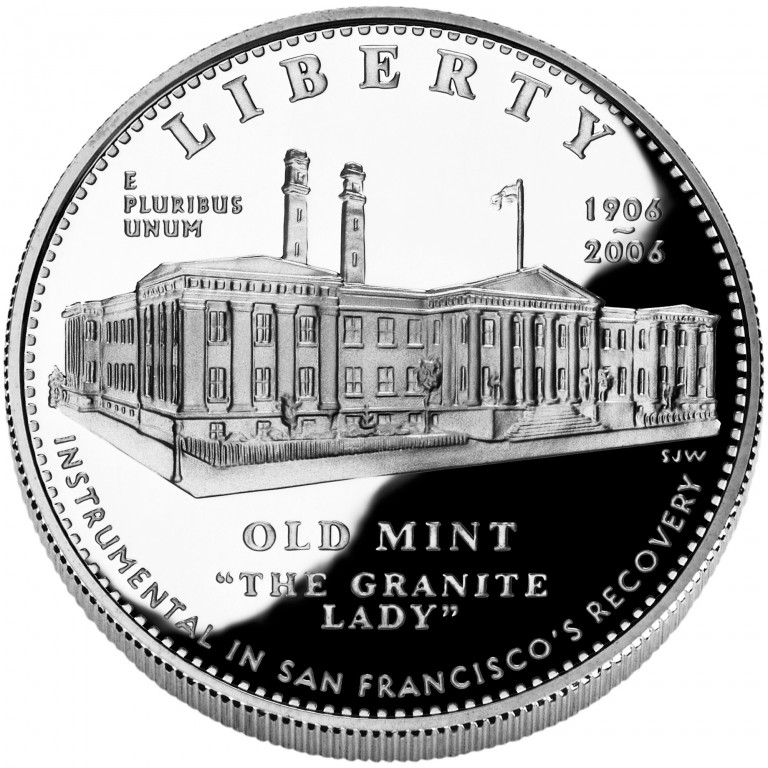
The obverse of the 2006 San Francisco Old Mint commemorative dollar shows the Old Mint. It was released to commemorate the centennial of the 1906 San Francisco earthquake and the role of the Mint in the city's recovery.

The building had a central pedimented portico flanked by projecting wings in an E-shape; it was built around a completely enclosed central courtyard that contained a well. These features saved it during the fires that followed the San Francisco Earthquake of 1906, when the heat melted the plate glass windows and exploded sandstone and granite blocks with which it was faced. The building is based on a concrete and granite foundation, designed to thwart tunneling into its vaults. At the time of the 1906 earthquake, the Mint held $300 million, (Note: about $8.04 billion in 2025 adjusted for inflation) fully a third of the United States' gold reserves. Efforts by Superintendent of the Mint, Frank A. Leach, and his men preserved the building and the bullion that backed the nation's currency. The mint resumed operation soon thereafter, continuing until 1937 at this site.

Now known as the Old San Francisco Mint, it was designated as a National Historic Landmark in 1961 and sold to the city of San Francisco in 2003. There are plans for adaptive reuse, including as a museum, and continued special events space.

=== Current building ===
The new Mint, located at 155 Hermann Street, was dedicated on May 15, 1937. Days prior, the Mint's store of $595,000,000 in gold and silver bullion was transferred from the old facility to the new in post office vans under heavy guard by police and the Secret Service.

The San Francisco Mint ceased operations in 1955. Lower production costs at the Denver Mint meant that facility could provide coins to the west coast despite the cost of shipping. San Francisco would continue to operate as an assay office.

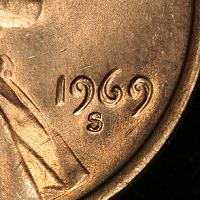
S mint mark on a 1969 Lincoln penny with a doubled die error.

The shuttered mint was reactivated to strike supplemental circulating coinage starting in 1965 with pennies backdated to 1964, and it further took over most proof coinage production from the Philadelphia Mint after 1968. Since 1975, the San Francisco Mint has been used almost exclusively for proof coinage, with the exception of the Susan B. Anthony dollar from 1979 to 1981, a portion of the mintage of cents through the early 1980s, and circulation-strike America the Beautiful quarters marked with an "S" mint mark and issued only for collectors since 2012. The dollars and quarters bear a mint mark of an "S", but the cents are otherwise indistinguishable from those minted at Philadelphia (which bear no mint marks, unlike those years' proof cents from San Francisco and circulation cents from Denver).

From 1962 to 1988, the San Francisco Mint was officially an assay office; the San Francisco Assay Office was granted mint status again on March 31, 1988 (Pub. L. 100–274). It admits visitors only as a rare exception. On May 15, 1987, to commemorate the 50th anniversary of the Mint, a limited number of people were allowed to tour the facility. This tour was advertised in the San Francisco Chronicle newspaper, with reservations required.

== Circulating denominations minted ==
=== Base metal coins ===
| Coin type | Series | Years minted | Image | Notes |
|---|---|---|---|---|
| Penny | Indian Head | 1908–1909 | Upload image | |
| Penny | Lincoln Wheat | 1909–1921; 1923–1931; 1935–1942; 1944–1955 | | |
| Penny | Lincoln Wheat | 1943 | | Minted in zinc-coated steel for one year only in an attempt to save copper during World War II. |
| Penny | Lincoln Memorial | 1964–1975; 1978–1985 | Upload image | No mint mark was used for circulation San Francisco pennies dated 1964 through 1967, 1975, and 1978 through 1985, thus these issues are indistinguishable from those produced in Philadelphia. |
| Nickel | Liberty Head | 1912 | Upload image | |
| Nickel | Buffalo | 1913–1921; 1923–1931; 1935–1937 | | |
| Nickel | Jefferson | 1938–1942; 1946–1949; 1951–1954; 1968–1970 | | Minted in a silver alloy from 1942–1945 (see below). |
| Dollar | Susan B. Anthony | 1979–1980 | | The 1981 strike was only issued in mint sets intended for collectors. |

=== Silver coins ===
| Coin type | Series | Years minted | Image | Notes |
|---|---|---|---|---|
| Nickel | Wartime | 1942–1945 | Upload image | Minted in an alloy of 56% copper, 35% silver, and 9% manganese as an attempt to save nickel during World War II. |
| Half dime | Seated Liberty | 1863–1873 | Upload image | |
| Dime | Seated Liberty | 1856; 1858–1877; 1884–1891 | Upload image | |
| Dime | Barber | 1892–1916 | | |
| Dime | Mercury | 1916–1920; 1923–1931; 1935–1941 | | |
| Dime | Roosevelt | 1946–1955 | Upload image | |
| Twenty-cent piece | Seated Liberty | 1875 | Upload image | |
| Quarter | Seated Liberty | 1855–1862; 1864–1869; 1871–1878; 1888; 1891 | | |
| Quarter | Barber | 1892–1903; 1905; 1907–1909; 1911–1915 | | |
| Quarter | Standing Liberty | 1917–1920; 1923–1924; 1926–1930 | | |
| Quarter | Washington | 1932; 1935–1948; 1950–1954 | | |
| Half dollar | Seated Liberty | 1855–1878 | | |
| Half dollar | Barber | 1892–1915 | | |
| Half dollar | Walking Liberty | 1916–1921; 1923; 1927–1929; 1933–1937; 1939–1946 | | |
| Half dollar | Franklin | 1949; 1951–1954 | Upload image | |
| Dollar | Seated Liberty | 1859; 1870; 1872–1873 | Upload image | No 1873-S Seated Liberty is known to have been saved from a mintage of 700. |
| Dollar | Trade | 1873–1878 | | |
| Dollar | Morgan | 1878–1904; 1921 | | The reverse design was reused for the 2006 San Francisco Old Mint commemorative dollar. |
| Dollar | Peace | 1922–1928; 1934–1935 | Upload image | |

=== Gold coins ===
| Coin type | Series | Years minted | Image | Notes |
|---|---|---|---|---|
| Gold dollar | Liberty Head | 1854 | Upload image | |
| Gold dollar | Indian Head | 1856–1860; 1870 | Upload image | |
| Quarter eagle | Liberty Head | 1854; 1856–1857; 1859–1863; 1865–1873; 1875–1879 | Upload image | |
| Three-dollar piece | Indian Head | 1855–1857; 1860; 1870 | Upload image | |
| Half eagle | Liberty Head | 1854–1888; 1892–1906 | | The reverse design was reused for the 2006 San Francisco Old Mint commemorative half eagle. |
| Half eagle | Indian Head | 1908–1916 | Upload image | |
| Eagle | Liberty Head | 1854–1874; 1876–1889; 1892–1903; 1905–1907 | | |
| Eagle | Indian Head | 1908–1916; 1920; 1930 | Upload image | |
| Double eagle | Liberty Head | 1854–1885; 1887–1907 | | |
| Double eagle | Saint-Gaudens | 1908–1911; 1913–1916; 1920; 1922; 1924–1927; 1930 | Upload image | |

== See also ==
- List of mints
- Historical United States mints
- Carson City Mint
- Charlotte Mint
- Dahlonega Mint
- Denver Mint
- New Orleans Mint
- Philadelphia Mint
- List of San Francisco Designated Landmarks
