= Protection Island mining disaster =

Mining disaster near Nanaimo, British Columbia

Protection Island Mining Disaster
- Date: September 10, 1918
- Location: Protection Island near Nanaimo British Columbia, Canada
- Type: Mining accident
- Cause: Hoising cable break, transport cab fall
- Deaths: 16

The Protection Island mining disaster killed 16 miners and occurred on Protection Island near Nanaimo, British Columbia, Canada. The disaster occurred at 7:10 a.m. on September 10, 1918 when the hoisting cable frayed on the cab that was lowering miners into the mine. Six other cabs of 16 miners each had preceded the cab which fell 300 feet (~100 m) into the mine. The bodies of the miners were mangled to the point where personal effects were used to identify the victims. It was later determined that salt water in the air had caused corrosion of the cable leading to the accident.

== See also ==
- 1887 Nanaimo mine explosion
