= San Francisco Old Mint commemorative coins =

2006 US commemorative coin set

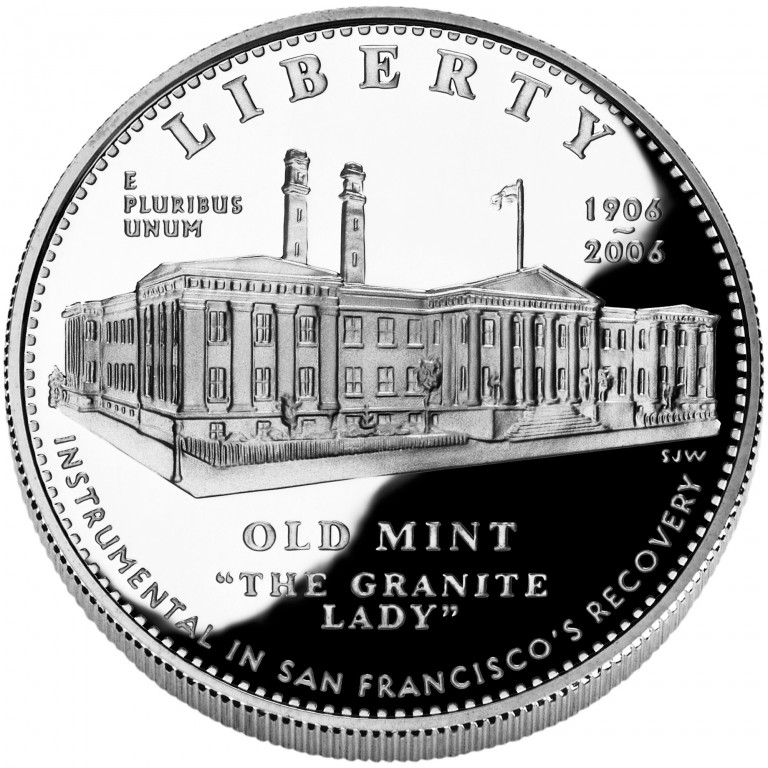
Obverse of the commemorative dollar featuring the San Francisco Old Mint

The San Francisco Old Mint commemorative coins were issued by the United States Mint in 2006. The coins commemorate the centennial of the 1906 San Francisco earthquake and the role of the San Francisco Old Mint in the city's recovery.

== Background ==
Established in response to the California gold rush, the San Francisco Mint began operations in March 1854 in a building purchased from private contractors who previously coined gold for the United States Assay Office. The early facility faced several issues, and in 1874 a second Mint building was dedicated and took over operations. Nicknamed "the Granite Lady," the second Mint operated until 1937, when the current third Mint building opened.

The Old San Francisco Mint was one of the few structures to survive the 1906 San Francisco earthquake and subsequent fires. The Mint was able to continue operations immediately, and helped administer disaster relief funds for the city.

== Legislation ==
The San Francisco Old Mint Commemorative Coin Act was introduced in the House of Representatives by Representative Nancy Pelosi on April 28, 2005, after an earlier version failed to pass. Various numismatic magazines and newspapers asked readers to persuade their representatives and senators to vote for the bill. A call to action in a September 2005 issue of The Numismatist encouraged readers to call their congressperson and donate to lobbying efforts in support of the bill. These efforts proved successful, and the bill passed the House on November 10, 2005, and the Senate on May 25, 2005. President George W. Bush signed the bill into Public Law 109–230 on June 15, 2006. The law authorized the striking of 500,000 silver dollars and 100,000 gold half eagles in both proof and uncirculated finishes with designs "emblematic of the San Francisco Old Mint Building".

== Designs ==
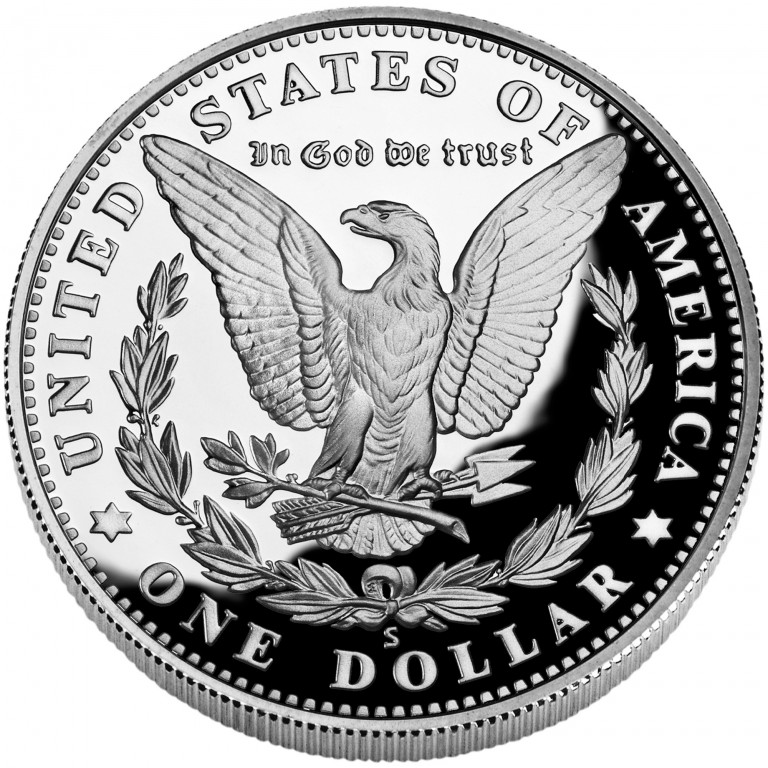
Reverse of the dollar coin, taken from a Morgan dollar

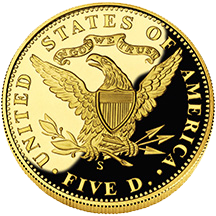
Reverse of the half eagle, taken from a Liberty Head half eagle

Designs for the coins were approved by Secretary of the Treasury Henry M. Paulson Jr. on August 3, 2006.

=== Dollar ===
The obverse of the dollar featured a San Francisco Old Mint design taken from a medal commemorating the Mint designed by Sherl J. Winter. The reverse of the dollar is a reproduction of the reverse of the Morgan dollar, originally designed by George T. Morgan. Mint engraver Joseph Menna sculpted a new model for the commemorative dollar from a 1904-S Morgan dollar.

=== Half eagle ===
The obverse of the half eagle, designed by Charles L. Vickers, also featured the San Francisco Old Mint, basing the design off the original 1869 construction drawings by architect A. B. Mullett. The reverse of the half eagle is a copy of the reverse of the Liberty Head half eagle. Mint engraver Don Everhart adapted the design from a 1906-S Liberty Head half eagle.

== Production and release ==
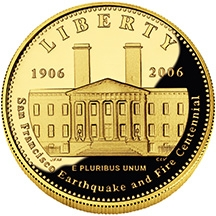
Obverse of the commemorative half eagle

A ceremonial first strike was held at the San Francisco Mint, where all the coins were struck. Surcharges from sales of the coins were to be donated to the San Francisco Museum and Historical Society for the preservation of the Old Mint and "an American coin and Gold Rush museum." For the dollar, mintage totaled 67,100 uncirculated and 160,870 proof coins. For the half eagle, mintage totaled 17,500 uncirculated and 44,174 proof coins.

== See also ==
- United States commemorative coins
- List of United States commemorative coins and medals (2000s)
- San Francisco–Oakland Bay Bridge half dollar
