= 1887 Nanaimo mine explosion =

1887 mine explosion in Canada

Coordinates: 49.157923°N 123.929004°W

The Nanaimo mine explosion occurred on May 3, 1887, in Nanaimo, British Columbia, Canada, killing 150 miners. Only seven miners survived and the mine burned for one full day.

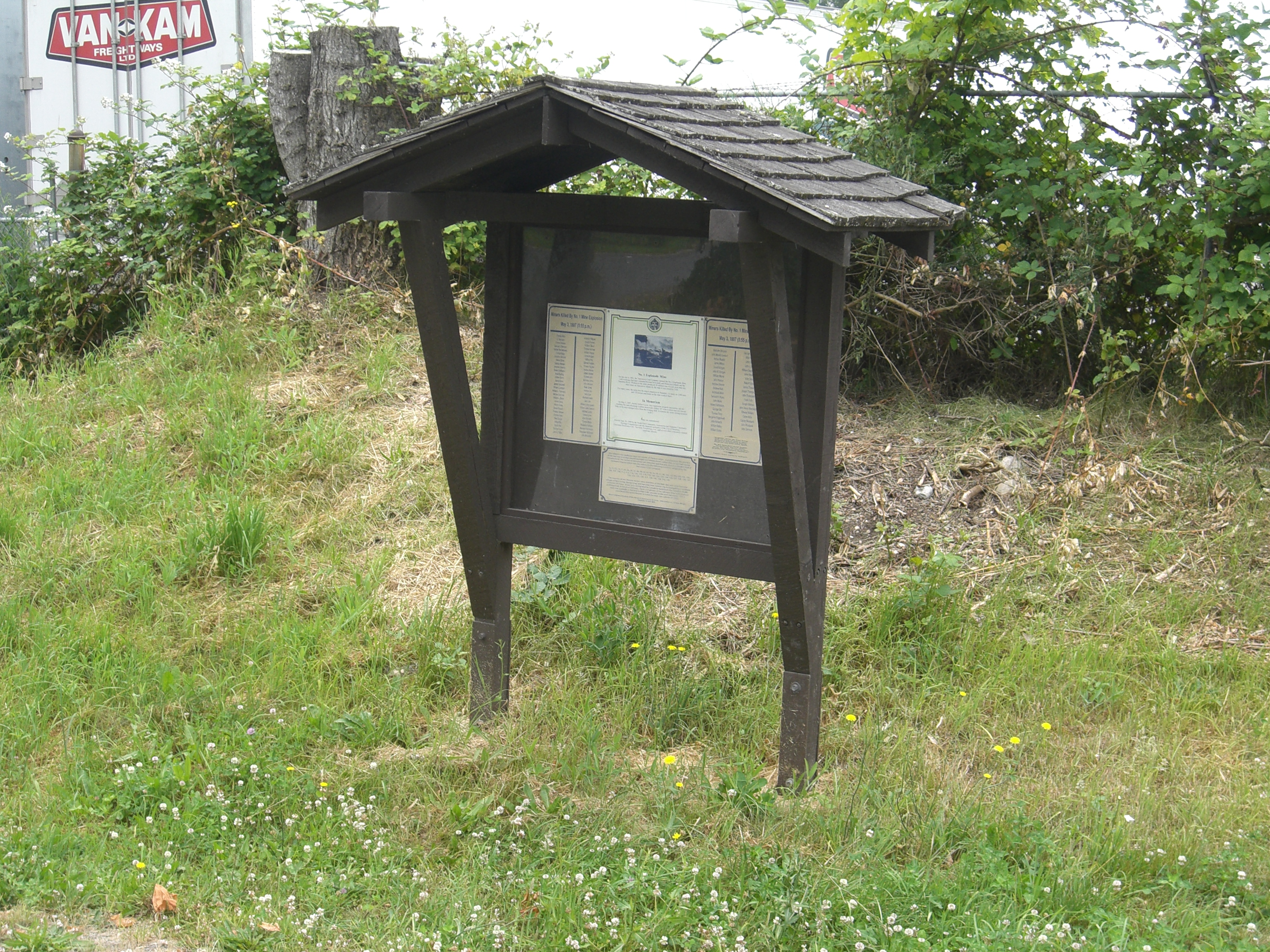
No 1 Esplanade Explosion Monument (see gallery for text detail)

The explosion started deep underground in the Number One Coal Mine after explosives were laid improperly. Although many miners died instantly, others were trapped by the explosion and the fires that followed. Most miners did not die from the primary explosions or the fires, but many actually died from choking on poisonous gas hours after the initial explosions. These men wrote farewell messages in the dust of their shovels. Nearly 150 children lost their fathers and 46 women became widows. Most of the men were settlers from Cornwall, Wales and Yorkshire. A plaque at the foot of Milton Street commemorates the event.

Although past documents put the death toll at 148, researchers have since revised the number to 150, including 53 Chinese workers. Chinese workers were listed in the government inquest and annual report of the Minister of Mines as "Chinamen, names unknown", followed by a payroll number. B.C. employers did not have to report the deaths of Chinese employees until 1897. Some accounts suggest that 48 of the 53 miners had the surname of Mah — records may have been destroyed when Nanaimo's Chinatown burned to the ground in 1960. The monument on Milton Street lists the names of white miners, but only the payroll numbers for the Chinese miners.

Operated by the Vancouver Coal Company, the Number One mine opened in 1884 at the foot of Milton Street in Nanaimo. Its shafts and tunnels extended under the Nanaimo Harbour to Protection Island, Newcastle Island, and the Nanaimo River. After the explosion, the mine re-opened and produced 18 million tons of coal before permanently closing in 1938.

== Gallery ==
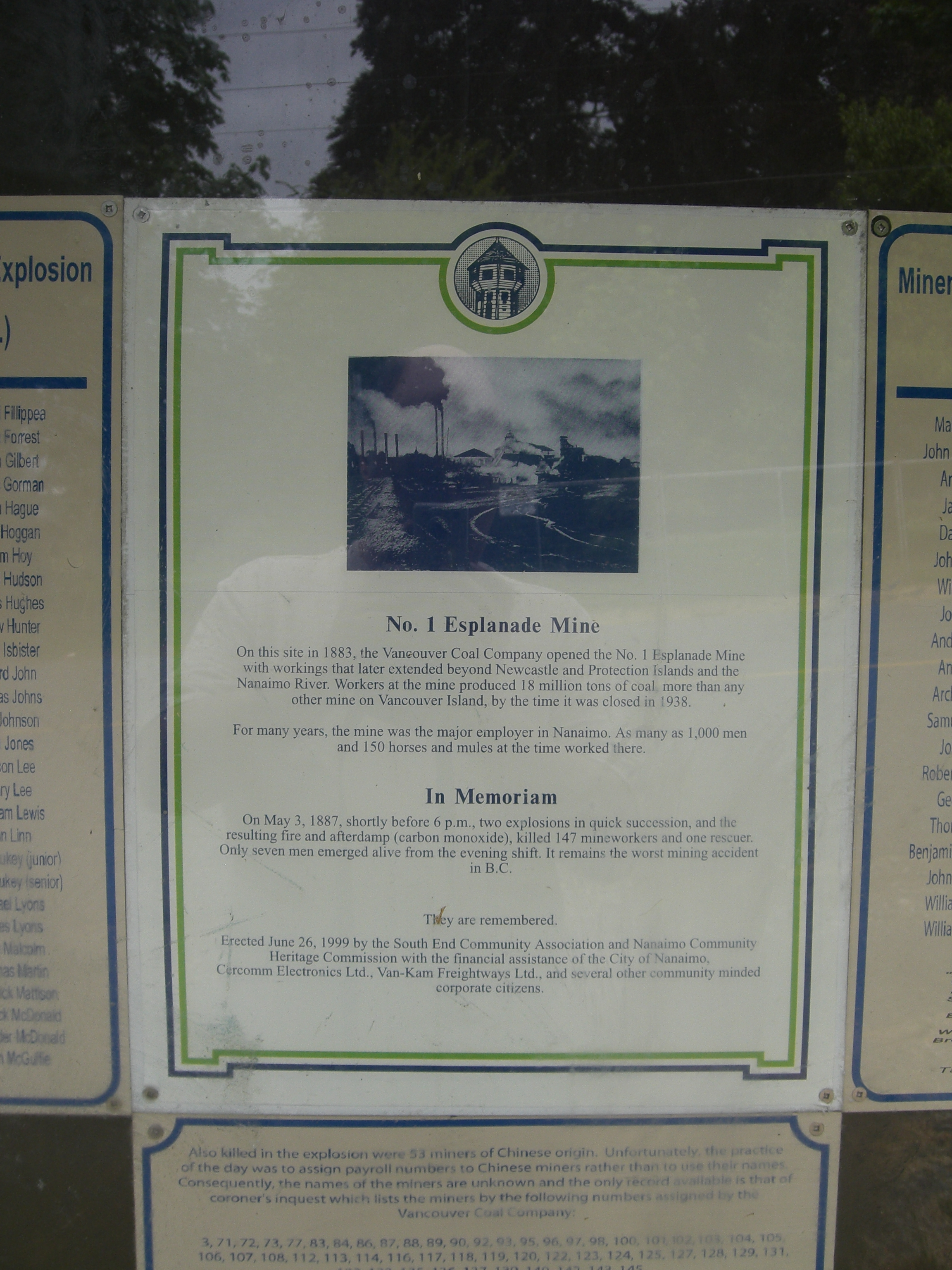
Centre panel (2008)

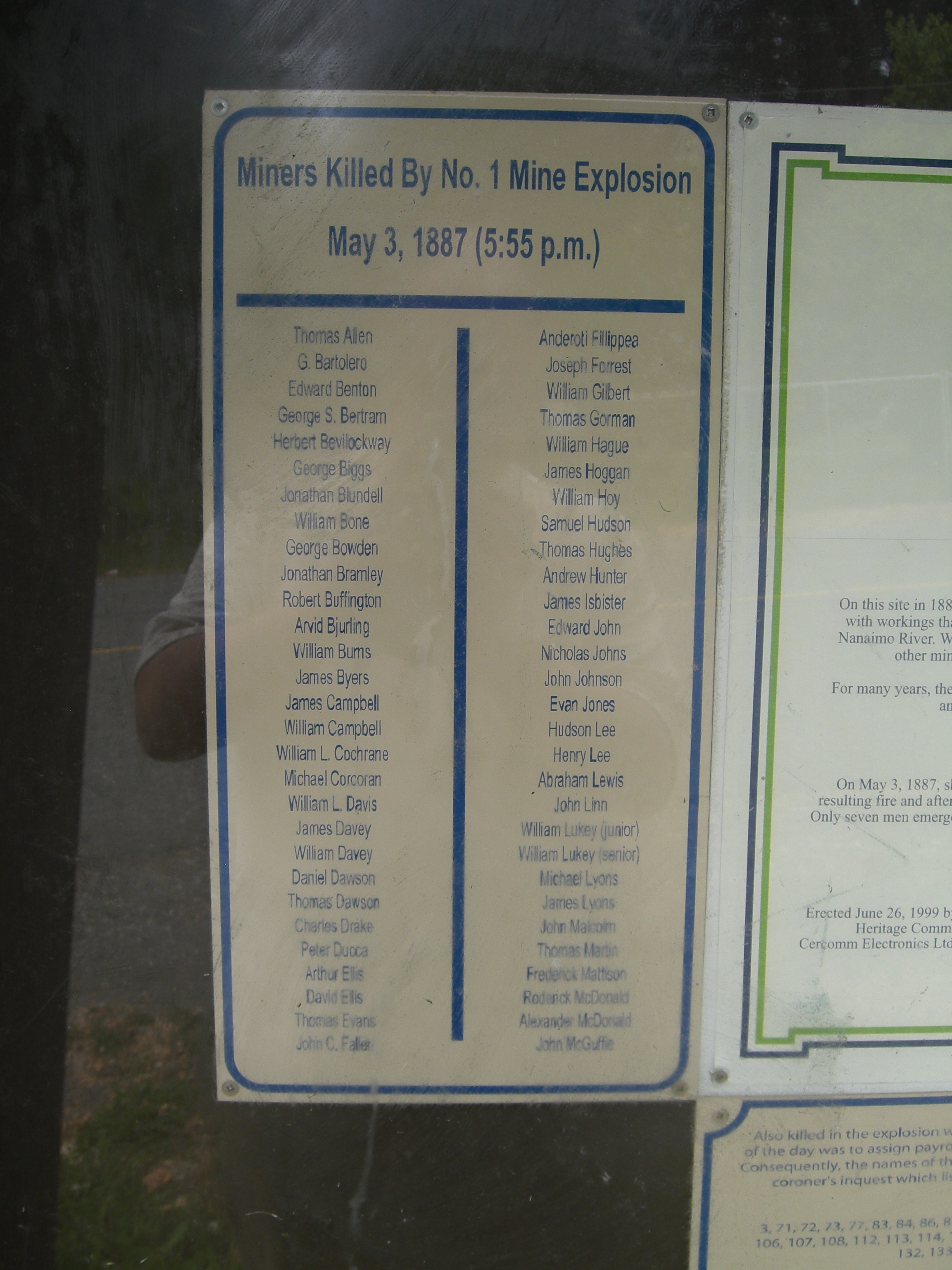
Left panel (2008)

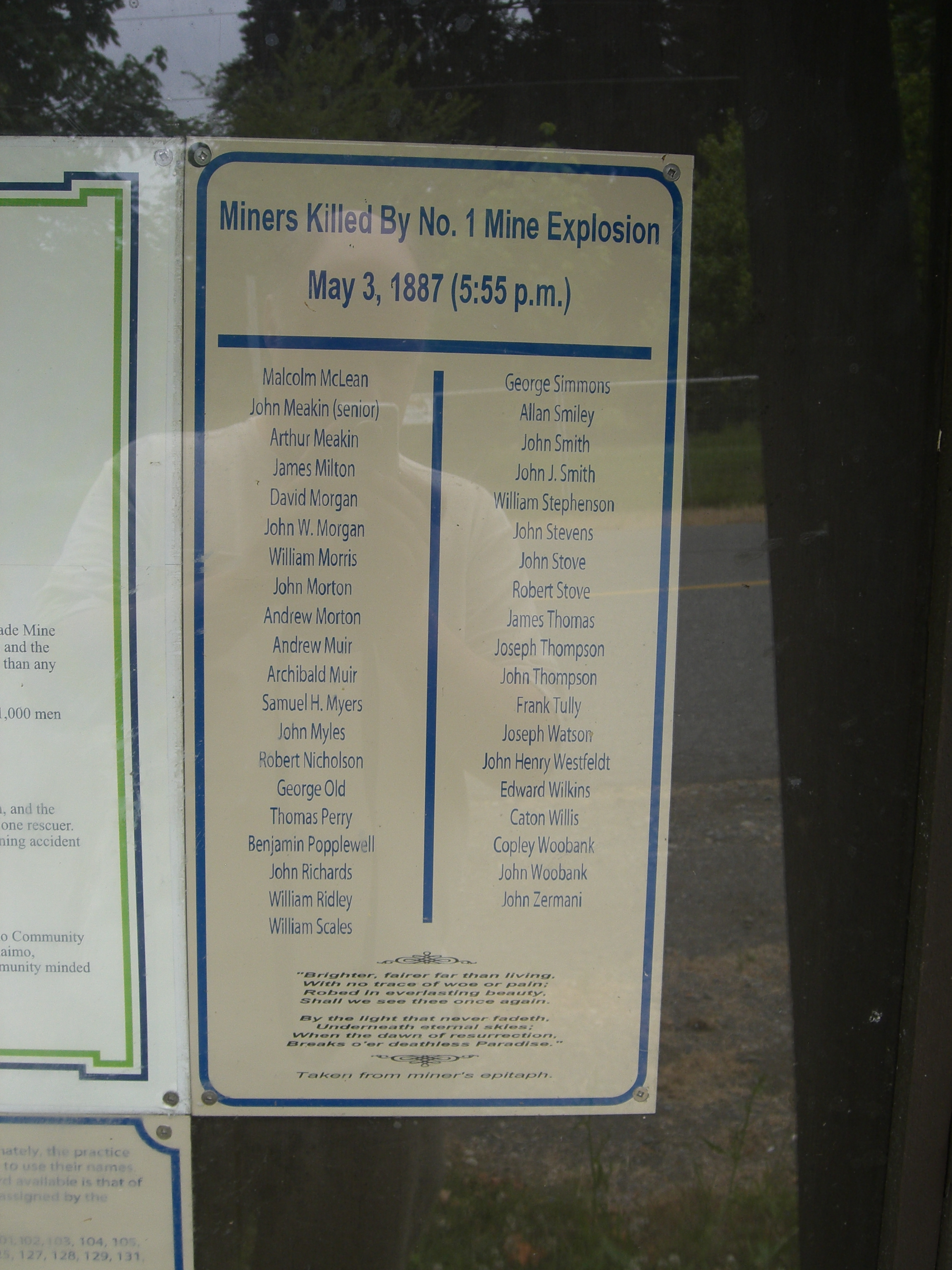
Right panel (2008)

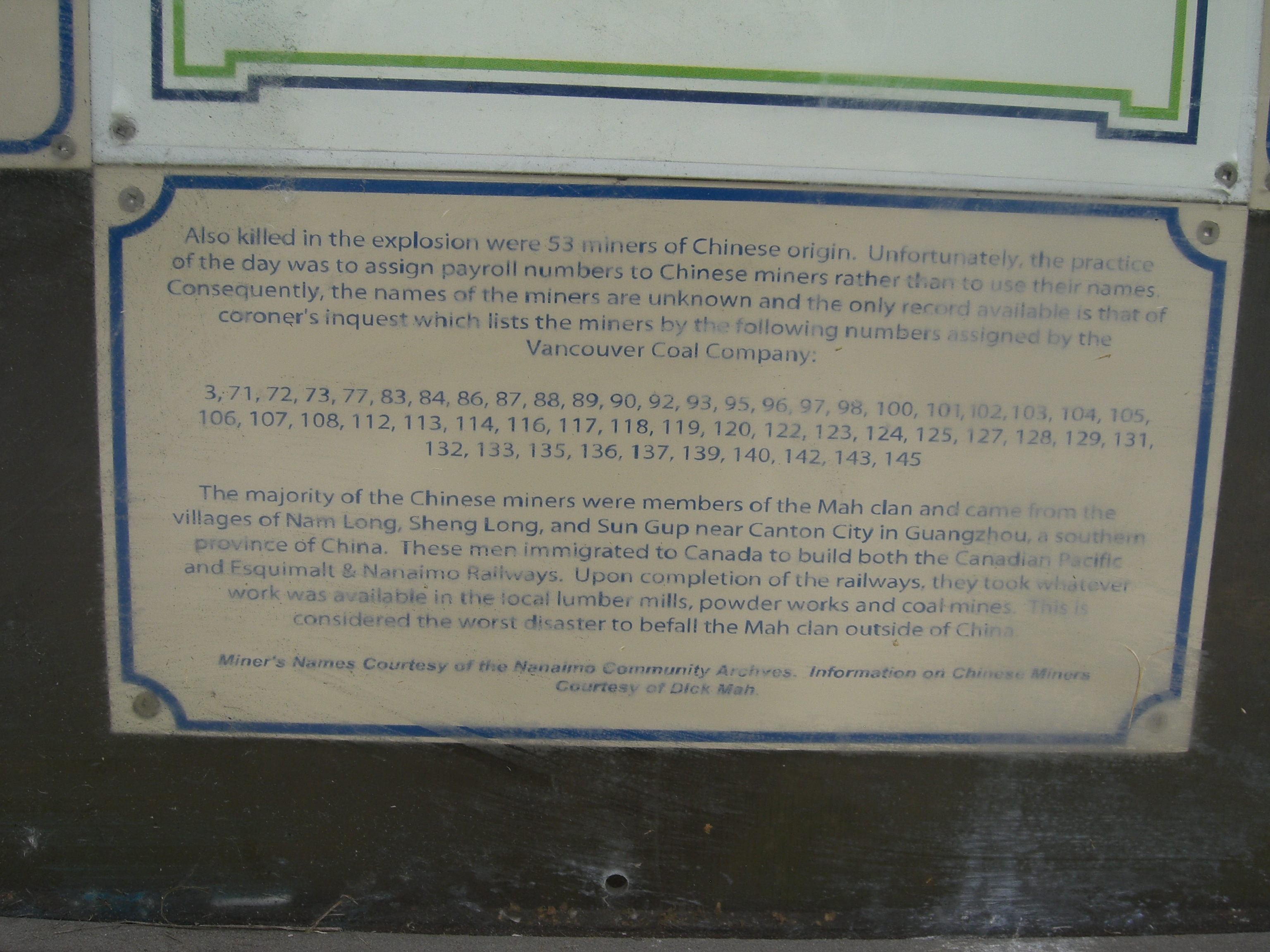
Lower panel (2008)

== See also ==
- Largest artificial non-nuclear explosions
- Protection Island mining disaster
