= List of historic places in the Nanaimo Regional District =

The following list includes all of the Canadian Register of Historic Places listings in Nanaimo Regional District, British Columbia.

Name	Address	Coordinates	Government recognition (CRHP №)	Wikidata ID	Image
A.R. Johnston Block	174 Commercial Street; Nanaimo BC	49°10′01″N 123°56′13″W	Nanaimo municipality (1407)		
Angell's Trading	426 Fitzwilliam Street; Nanaimo BC	49°09′56″N 123°56′31″W	Nanaimo municipality (1432)		
Ashlar Lodge Masonic Temple	101 Commercial Street; Nanaimo BC	49°09′58″N 123°56′13″W	Nanaimo municipality (1404)		
B.C. Telephone Exchange Building	70 Bastion Street; Nanaimo BC	49°10′01″N 123°56′13″W	Nanaimo municipality (1354)		
Bank of Commerce	17 Church Street; Nanaimo BC	49°10′02″N 123°56′14″W	Nanaimo municipality (1350)		
Bastion	94 Front Street; Nanaimo BC	49°10′01″N 123°56′10″W	Nanaimo municipality (1351)		
Beattie Residence	825 Fitzwilliam Street; Nanaimo BC	49°09′49″N 123°56′53″W	Nanaimo municipality (3719)		
Beban House	2290 Bowen Road; Nanaimo BC	49°11′40″N 123°59′35″W	Nanaimo municipality (1353)		
Brick Cottage	1904 Jingle Pot Road; Nanaimo BC	49°10′00″N 123°58′23″W	Nanaimo municipality (6179)		
Brumpton Block	489 Wallace Street; Nanaimo BC	49°09′50″N 123°56′13″W	Nanaimo municipality (1409)		
Caldwell Block	35 Commercial Street; Nanaimo BC	49°09′54″N 123°56′13″W	Nanaimo municipality (1400)		
Castaway Motel Neon Sign	205 Terminal Avenue; Nanaimo BC	49°10′28″N 123°56′49″W	Nanaimo municipality (16955)		
Central Dairy Building	428 Fitzwilliam Street; Nanaimo BC	49°09′56″N 123°56′31″W	Nanaimo municipality (3715)		
Chinese Cemetery	1598 Townsite Road; Nanaimo BC	49°10′55″N 123°58′23″W	Nanaimo municipality (3742)		
Christian Science Society Building	20 Chapel Street; Nanaimo BC	49°10′09″N 123°56′17″W	Nanaimo municipality (1356)		
Commercial Hotel	121 Bastion Street; Nanaimo BC	49°09′58″N 123°56′13″W	Nanaimo municipality (1132)		
Craig Street Residence	112 Craig Street; Nanaimo BC	49°10′05″N 123°57′11″W	Nanaimo municipality (16943)		
Cranberry Avenue Residence	1500 Cranberry Avenue; Nanaimo BC	49°07′23″N 123°55′08″W	Nanaimo municipality (6176)		
Crossan Residence	718 Wentworth Street; Nanaimo BC	49°10′00″N 123°56′49″W	Nanaimo municipality (16961)		
Dallas Square Cenotaph	85 Church Street; Nanaimo BC	49°10′05″N 123°56′13″W	Nanaimo municipality (6187)		
Eagles' Hall	135 Bastion Street; Nanaimo BC	49°09′58″N 123°56′13″W	Nanaimo municipality (1322)		
Earl Block	2 Church Street; Nanaimo BC	49°10′01″N 123°56′13″W	Nanaimo municipality (1349)		
Eighth Street Residence	467 Eighth Street; Nanaimo BC	49°08′37″N 123°56′49″W	Nanaimo municipality (6177)		Upload Photo
Ekins Residence	441 Vancouver Avenue; Nanaimo BC	49°10′37″N 123°56′46″W	Nanaimo municipality (16958)		
Entrance Island Lighthouse	Entrance Island, off the northeast tip of Gabriola Island; Nanaimo BC	49°12′32″N 123°48′37″W	Federal (20782)		
Esquimalt and Nanaimo Railway Station	321 Selby Street; Nanaimo BC	49°09′50″N 123°56′31″W	Nanaimo municipality (1418)		
Esquimalt and Nanaimo Railway Station	321 Selby Street; Nanaimo BC	49°09′54″N 123°56′35″W	Federal (4522)		
Federal Building	60 Front Street; Nanaimo BC	49°10′06″N 123°56′12″W	Federal (9506)		
Fernville	167 Irwin Street; Nanaimo BC	49°09′29″N 123°55′52″W	Nanaimo municipality (16946)		
First Nanaimo Scout Hut	445 Comox Road; Nanaimo BC	49°10′12″N 123°56′35″W	Nanaimo municipality (1363)		
Five Acre Farm	560 Third Street; Nanaimo BC	49°09′48″N 123°57′25″W	Nanaimo municipality (3950)		
Fourth Street Store Building	423 Fourth Street; Nanaimo BC	49°09′31″N 123°57′11″W	Nanaimo municipality (3709)		
Franklyn Street Gymnasium	421 Franklyn Street; Nanaimo BC	49°09′49″N 123°56′24″W	Nanaimo municipality (1425)		
Free Press Building	223 Commercial Street; Nanaimo BC	49°10′01″N 123°56′17″W	Nanaimo municipality (1355)		
Freethy Residence	304 Kennedy Street; Nanaimo BC	49°09′50″N 123°56′46″W	Nanaimo municipality (3699)		
Galbraith Residence	164 Mount Benson Street; Nanaimo BC	49°10′33″N 123°56′42″W	Nanaimo municipality (3728)		
Galloway Building	405 Terminal Avenue; Nanaimo BC	49°10′35″N 123°56′49″W	Nanaimo municipality (16956)		
Gallows Point Lightkeeper's Cottage	208 Colvilleton Trail; Nanaimo BC	49°10′16″N 123°55′05″W	Nanaimo municipality (3722)		More images
Garden Memorial to Chinese Pioneers	105 St. George Street; Nanaimo BC	49°10′53″N 123°56′46″W	Nanaimo municipality (16952)		
Giovando-Westwood Residence	225 Newcastle Avenue; Nanaimo BC	49°10′31″N 123°56′31″W	Nanaimo municipality (3730)		Upload Photo
Girvin Road Residence	797 Girvin Road; Nanaimo BC	49°10′45″N 123°57′47″W	Nanaimo municipality (3724)		
Globe Hotel	25 Front Street; Nanaimo BC	49°10′09″N 123°56′17″W	Nanaimo municipality (1360)		
Granby Mine Residence	523 Vancouver Avenue; Nanaimo BC	49°10′43″N 123°56′49″W	Nanaimo municipality (16959)		
Gulliford Residence	285 Wall Street; Nanaimo BC	49°10′30″N 123°57′04″W	Nanaimo municipality (16960)		
Gusola Block	104 Commercial Street; Nanaimo BC	49°09′58″N 123°56′13″W	Nanaimo municipality (1405)		
Haliburton Street Methodist Church	602 Haliburton Street; Nanaimo BC	49°09′11″N 123°55′59″W	Nanaimo municipality (3721)		
Hall Block	37 Commercial Street; Nanaimo BC	49°09′54″N 123°56′13″W	Nanaimo municipality (1401)		
Harewood Colliery Dam	645 Wakesiah Avenue; Nanaimo BC	49°08′54″N 123°57′58″W	Nanaimo municipality (6181)		
Harewood School	505 Howard Avenue; Nanaimo BC	49°09′20″N 123°57′22″W	Nanaimo municipality (1423)		Upload Photo
Harris Residence	375 Franklyn Street; Nanaimo BC	49°09′50″N 123°56′20″W	Nanaimo municipality (1426)		
Harrison Residence	546 Prideaux Street; Nanaimo BC	49°09′38″N 123°56′17″W	Nanaimo municipality (3706)		
Hayes Residence	703 Haliburton Street; Nanaimo BC	49°09′02″N 123°55′55″W	Nanaimo municipality (3698)		
Hirst Block	99 Commercial Street; Nanaimo BC	49°09′58″N 123°56′13″W	Nanaimo municipality (1403)		
Hoggan's Store	404 Stewart Street; Nanaimo BC	49°10′37″N 123°56′38″W	Nanaimo municipality (1366)		
Isaacson Residence	255 Stewart Avenue; Nanaimo BC	49°10′31″N 123°56′38″W	Nanaimo municipality (6184)		
Jean Burns Building [Destroyed by fire March 2016]	6 Commercial Street; Nanaimo BC	49°09′50″N 123°56′10″W	Nanaimo municipality (1398)		Upload Photo
Jenkins Residence	674 Wentworth Street; Nanaimo BC	49°10′01″N 123°56′46″W	Nanaimo municipality (3727)		
Johnston Residence	36 Stewart Avenue; Nanaimo BC	49°10′24″N 123°56′31″W	Nanaimo municipality (1365)		
Jones Residence	639 Prideaux Street; Nanaimo BC	49°09′35″N 123°56′10″W	Nanaimo municipality (3707)		Upload Photo
Layer-Hall Residence	115 Machleary Street; Nanaimo BC	49°10′01″N 123°57′00″W	Nanaimo municipality (3725)		
Ledingham Residence	347 Milton Street; Nanaimo BC	49°09′48″N 123°56′42″W	Nanaimo municipality (3703)		
Mallard Lake Dam and Mallard Lake	Nanaimo BC	49°11′47″N 123°56′13″W	British Columbia (18079)		Upload Photo
Merchant's Bank of Canada	499 Wallace Street; Nanaimo BC	49°09′50″N 123°56′13″W	Nanaimo municipality (1328)		
Meredith Road Residence	2126 Meredith Road; Nanaimo BC	49°11′19″N 123°59′24″W	Nanaimo municipality (6183)		
Millstone Avenue Residence	408 Millstone Avenue; Nanaimo BC	49°10′36″N 123°57′18″W	Nanaimo municipality (16948)		
Miner's Cottage	100 Cameron Road; Nanaimo BC	49°09′54″N 123°56′06″W	Nanaimo municipality (1419)		
Mitchell's Market	411 Fitzwilliam Street; Nanaimo BC	49°09′54″N 123°56′31″W	Nanaimo municipality (3714)		
Modern Cafe	221 Commercial Street; Nanaimo BC	49°10′00″N 123°56′13″W	Nanaimo municipality (3723)		
Morden Colliery	1830 Morden Road; Morden Colliery Historic Provincial Park BC	49°05′41″N 123°52′22″W	British Columbia (19592)		
Nanaimo City Hall	455 Wallace Street; Nanaimo BC	49°09′50″N 123°56′17″W	Nanaimo municipality (1327)		
Nanaimo Court House	35 Front Street; Nanaimo BC	49°10′08″N 123°56′17″W	Nanaimo municipality (1352)		
Nanaimo Fire Hall No. 2.	34 Nicol Street; Nanaimo BC	49°09′44″N 123°56′02″W	Nanaimo municipality (1436)		
Nanaimo Hospital	388 Machleary Street; Nanaimo BC	49°09′43″N 123°56′46″W	Nanaimo municipality (1427)		
Nanaimo Pioneer Bakery	39-45 Victoria Crescent; Nanaimo BC	49°09′47″N 123°56′10″W	Nanaimo municipality (1428)		
Nanaimo Public Cemetery	555 Bowen Road; Nanaimo BC	49°10′11″N 123°57′14″W	Nanaimo municipality (3741)		
Nash Hardware	19 Commercial Street; Nanaimo BC	49°09′53″N 123°56′13″W	Nanaimo municipality (1420)		
Newbury Farm House	678 Second Street; Nanaimo BC	49°10′00″N 123°57′36″W	Nanaimo municipality (3739)		
Newbury Residence	39 Milton Street; Nanaimo BC	49°10′07″N 123°56′49″W	Nanaimo municipality (16949)		
Newcastle Island Pavilion and Bathhouse	Nanaimo BC	49°10′54″N 123°55′41″W	British Columbia (18057)		Upload Photo
Northfield School	2249 Northfield Road; Nanaimo BC	49°11′30″N 123°59′46″W	Nanaimo municipality (3738)		
Occidental Hotel	432 Fitzwilliam Street; Nanaimo BC	49°09′56″N 123°56′35″W	Nanaimo municipality (1431)		
Our Lady of Good Counsel Roman Catholic Church	4334 Jingle Pot Road; Nanaimo BC	49°12′18″N 124°01′12″W	Nanaimo municipality (3746)		
Palace Hotel	275 Skinner Street; Nanaimo BC	49°09′56″N 123°56′17″W	Nanaimo municipality (1421)		
Pargeter Residence	536 Kennedy Street; Nanaimo BC	49°09′32″N 123°56′24″W	Nanaimo municipality (3708)		
Parkin Block	155 Commercial Street; Nanaimo BC	49°09′58″N 123°56′13″W	Nanaimo municipality (1406)		
Parrot Residence	411 Machleary Street; Nanaimo BC	49°09′38″N 123°56′46″W	Nanaimo municipality (16947)		
Pine Street Residence	259 Pine Street; Nanaimo BC	49°09′52″N 123°57′04″W	Nanaimo municipality (16950)		
Pioneer Cemetery Park	10 Wallace Street; Nanaimo BC	49°10′12″N 123°56′31″W	Nanaimo municipality (3740)		Upload Photo
Provincial Government Mine Rescue Station	1009 Farquhar Street; Nanaimo BC	49°09′21″N 123°55′48″W	Nanaimo municipality (1422)		
Provincial Liquor Store	25 Cavan Street; Nanaimo BC	49°09′47″N 123°56′13″W	Nanaimo municipality (1397)		
Queen's Hotel	34 Victoria Crescent; Nanaimo BC	49°09′49″N 123°56′10″W	Nanaimo municipality (1435)		
Ranger's Shoes Building	310 Fitzwilliam Street; Nanaimo BC	49°09′57″N 123°56′28″W	Nanaimo municipality (6178)		
Rawlinson & Glaholm Building	437 Fitzwilliam Street; Nanaimo BC	49°09′54″N 123°56′31″W	Nanaimo municipality (1430)		
Reid House	151 Skinner Street; Nanaimo BC	49°10′02″N 123°56′20″W	Nanaimo municipality (1364)		
Rogers Block	83 Commercial Street; Nanaimo BC	49°09′54″N 123°56′13″W	Nanaimo municipality (1402)		
Rowbottom Residence	320 Machleary Street; Nanaimo BC	49°09′48″N 123°56′53″W	Nanaimo municipality (3702)		
Rowe Residence	545 Haliburton Street; Nanaimo BC	49°09′13″N 123°55′55″W	Nanaimo municipality (3720)		
S and W Apartment Block	403 Fitzwilliam Street; Nanaimo BC	49°09′55″N 123°56′31″W	Nanaimo municipality (1434)		
Schetky Residence	225 Vancouver Avenue; Nanaimo BC	49°10′28″N 123°56′42″W	Nanaimo municipality (3736)		
Sharp Residence	261 Vancouver Avenue; Nanaimo BC	49°10′30″N 123°56′42″W	Nanaimo municipality (16957)		
Shaw Residence	41 Chapel Street; Nanaimo BC	49°10′10″N 123°56′20″W	Nanaimo municipality (1357)		
Shaw Residence	815 Fitzwilliam Street; Nanaimo BC	49°09′50″N 123°56′53″W	Nanaimo municipality (3718)		Upload Photo
Smith/Wilson Residence	12 Irwin Street; Nanaimo BC	49°09′41″N 123°55′55″W	Nanaimo municipality (16945)		
St. Andrew's United Church	315 Fitzwilliam Street; Nanaimo BC	49°09′54″N 123°56′28″W	Nanaimo municipality (1408)		
St. Paul's Anglican Church	100 Chapel Street; Nanaimo BC	49°10′04″N 123°56′13″W	Nanaimo municipality (1367)		
St. Peter's Cemetery	301 Machleary Street; Nanaimo BC	49°09′46″N 123°56′56″W	Nanaimo municipality (6180)		
Sullivan Residence	673 Selby Street; Nanaimo BC	49°09′37″N 123°56′10″W	Nanaimo municipality (3705)		
T and B Apartment Block	415 Fitzwilliam Street; Nanaimo BC	49°09′54″N 123°56′31″W	Nanaimo municipality (1433)		
Terminal Hotel	63 Victoria Crescent; Nanaimo BC	49°09′47″N 123°56′06″W	Nanaimo municipality (1429)		
Tom Brown's Autobody	28 Front Street; Nanaimo BC	49°10′09″N 123°56′13″W	Nanaimo municipality (1361)		
Van Houten Block	16 Commercial Street; Nanaimo BC	49°09′54″N 123°56′10″W	Nanaimo municipality (1399)		Upload Photo
Van Houten Residence	184 Mount Benson Street; Nanaimo BC	49°10′32″N 123°56′42″W	Nanaimo municipality (3729)		
Vancouver Island Regional Library	580 Fitzwilliam Street; Nanaimo BC	49°09′55″N 123°56′38″W	Nanaimo municipality (3716)		
Victoria Road Residence	413 Victoria Road; Nanaimo BC	49°09′17″N 123°56′10″W	Nanaimo municipality (16962)		
Wardill Residence	755 Terminal Avenue; Nanaimo BC	49°10′45″N 123°56′56″W	Nanaimo municipality (3737)		
Wellington Cemetery	4700 Ledgerwood Road; Nanaimo BC	49°12′37″N 124°01′48″W	Nanaimo municipality (3745)		
Wells Residence	904 Wentworth Street; Nanaimo BC	49°09′59″N 123°57′00″W	Nanaimo municipality (16963)		
Western Fuel Company House #24	715 Farquhar Street; Nanaimo BC	49°09′21″N 123°56′06″W	Nanaimo municipality (3713)		
Wilkinson Residence	305 Kennedy Street; Nanaimo BC	49°09′50″N 123°56′49″W	Nanaimo municipality (3700)		
Willard Service Station Building	291 Wallace Street; Nanaimo BC	49°09′57″N 123°56′28″W	Nanaimo municipality (6182)		
Williams Residence	40 Thetis Place; Nanaimo BC	49°11′27″N 123°57′50″W	Nanaimo municipality (3744)		
Wilson Residence	697 Wentworth Street; Nanaimo BC	49°09′59″N 123°56′46″W	Nanaimo municipality (3704)		
Wilton-Welch Residence	129 Milton Street; Nanaimo BC	49°10′01″N 123°56′49″W	Nanaimo municipality (3726)		
Woodman Residence	307 Kennedy Street; Nanaimo BC	49°09′49″N 123°56′49″W	Nanaimo municipality (3701)		
York Residence	908 Hecate Street; Nanaimo BC	49°09′27″N 123°56′24″W	Nanaimo municipality (16964)		
Zorkin Building	418 Fitzwilliam Street; Nanaimo BC	49°09′56″N 123°56′31″W	Nanaimo municipality (3717)		
Rathtrevor Beach Provincial Park	1240 Rath Road; Parkville BC	49°19′13″N 124°16′06″W	British Columbia (20066)		
Burnham Road Residence	394 Burnham Road; Qualicum Beach BC	49°21′25″N 124°25′44″W	Qualicum Beach municipality (16071)		
Crown Mansion	292 Crescent Road East; Qualicum Beach BC	49°21′14″N 124°25′59″W	Qualicum Beach municipality (16069)		
Former Canadian Pacific Railway (VIA Rail) Station	174 North Railway Street; Qualicum Beach BC	49°20′56″N 124°26′46″W	Federal (4573)		
Kinkade Farmstead	3567 Island Highway West; Qualicum Beach BC	49°21′49″N 124°29′13″W	Federal (9516)		Upload Photo
Old School House	122 Fern Road West; Qualicum Beach BC	49°20′45″N 124°26′35″W	Qualicum Beach municipality (16064)		
Powerhouse Museum	587 Beach Road; Qualicum Beach BC	49°21′01″N 124°26′53″W	Qualicum Beach municipality (16062)		
Qualicum Beach Community Hall	644 Memorial Avenue, Qualicum Beach BC	49°20′55″N 124°26′24″W	Qualicum Beach municipality (16067)		
Qualicum Beach Train Station	600 Beach Road; Qualicum Beach BC	49°20′59″N 124°26′49″W	Qualicum Beach municipality (16063)		
St. Mark’s Anglican Church	138 Hoylake Road West; Qualicum Beach BC	49°21′03″N 124°26′42″W	Qualicum Beach municipality (16065)		
Thrall Residence	124 2nd Avenue West; Qualicum Beach BC	49°20′50″N 124°26′36″W	Qualicum Beach municipality (16068)		Upload Photo
Village Theatre	110 2nd Avenue West; Qualicum Beach BC	49°20′49″N 124°26′31″W	Qualicum Beach municipality (16066)		Upload Photo
White House	210 Crescent Road West; Qualicum Beach BC	49°21′09″N 124°26′53″W	Qualicum Beach municipality (16070)		Upload Photo
