= Protection Island (Nanaimo) =

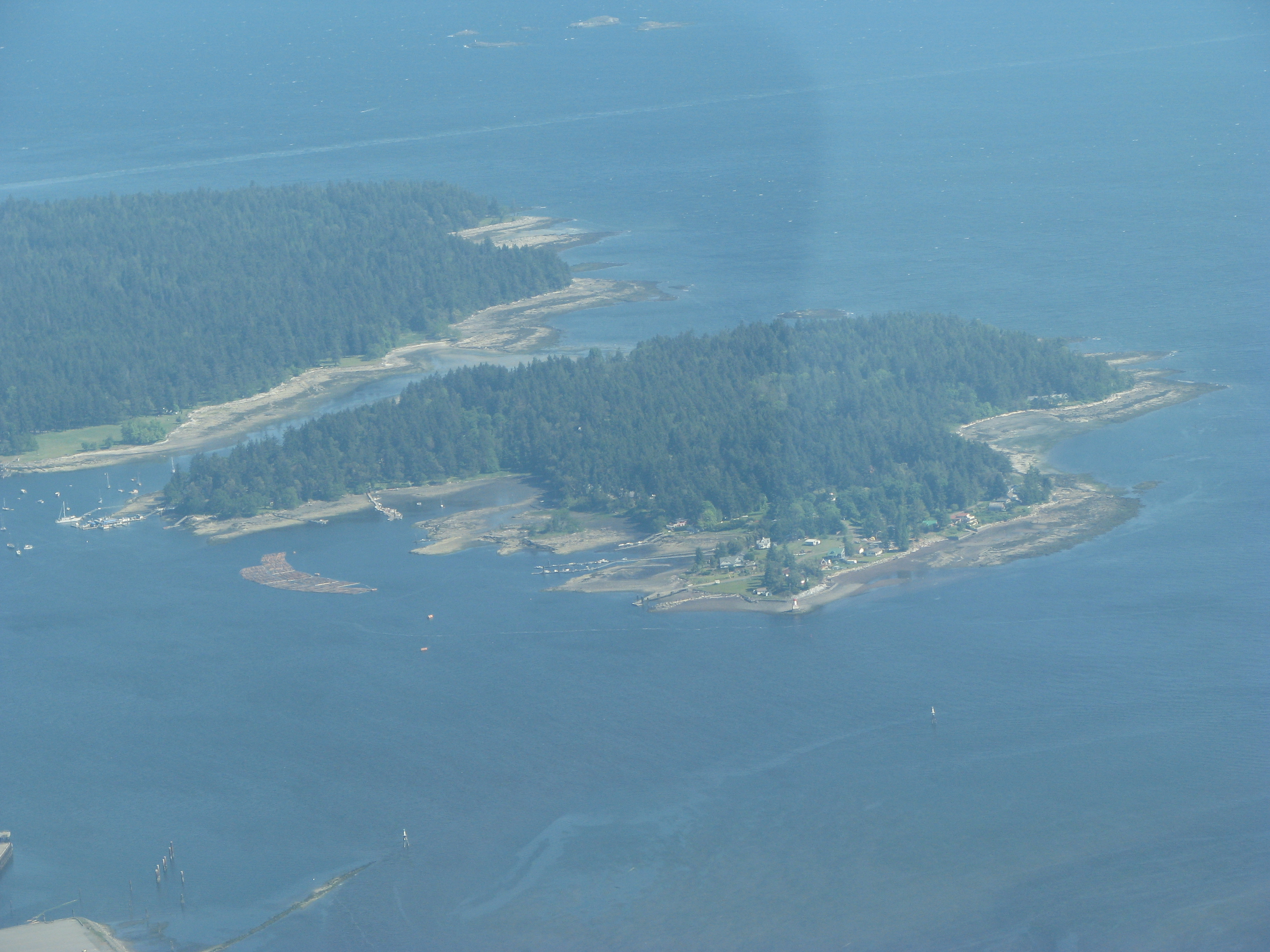

- Location of Protection Island in British Columbia
- Coordinates: 49°10′44″N 123°55′12″W
- Country: Canada
- Province: British Columbia

Population (2016)
  - Total: 350

Protection Island is a small island located 1.5 km north-east of downtown Nanaimo, British Columbia, Canada, in the Nanaimo Harbour. The island was originally named Douglas Island, after James Douglas the first Governor of the Colony of Vancouver Island and British Columbia. It was renamed Protection Island in 1960. The permanent year-round population is about 350 people.

There are no paved roads on the island. Some residents move about the island in golf carts, others with cars, but most walk. Locals frequently transport their groceries from the community dock with their own wheelbarrows. Access to the island can be via private vessel or a small, privately run ferry which departs from downtown Nanaimo at Maffeo Sutton Park and docks at the Dinghy Dock Pub (which is Canada's only floating pub). Some residents also commute by kayak or rowboat as well.

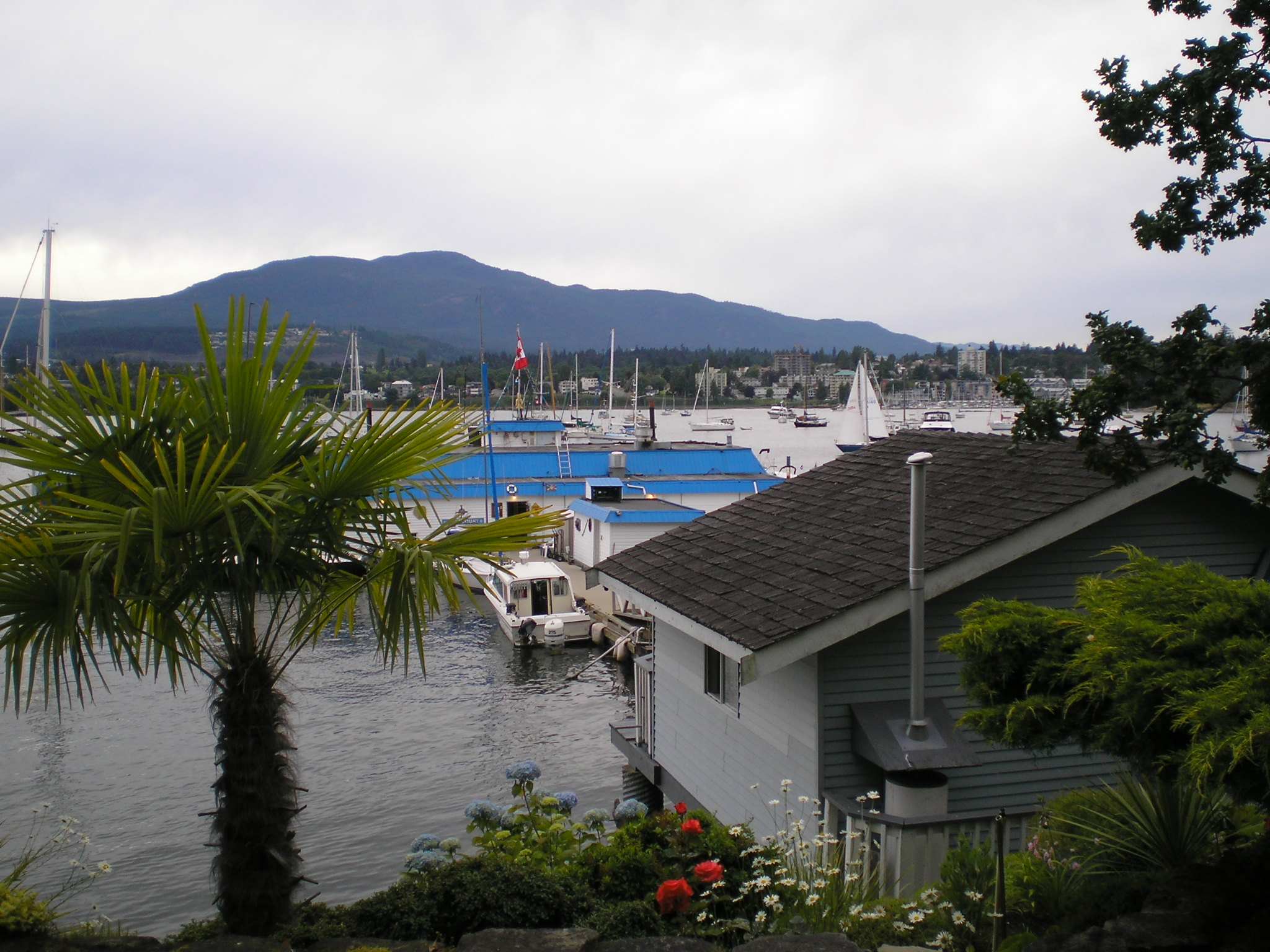
Dinghy Dock Pub and ferry terminal on Protection Island, Nanaimo

== History ==
=== Hangings on Execution Point ===
In the winter of 1852–53, a Scottish shepherd named Peter Brown was killed near present-day Nanaimo by two natives, one from Cowichan the other from Snuneymuxw. They were tracked down near Chase River and were tried on the ship SS Beaver on 17 January 1853. They were hanged the same day on the southernmost point of Protection Island. That point became known as Execution Point. In 1960, it was renamed Gallows Point.

=== SS Oscar ===
On 14 January 1913, the SS Oscar was loaded with dynamite, black powder, and coal from Departure Bay bound for Howe Sound. It had left Nanaimo Harbour and had gotten as far as Entrance Island when Captain Alexander McDonald realised the weather was too bad to proceed and that there was a fire near the ship's boilers. The captain turned the ship around and headed for Protection Island with the idea of beaching the vessel. He ran the ship aground at Execution Point and he and his five crewmen used a ladder to escape the ship and hide down a mineshaft. The resulting explosion destroyed the above ground workings of the mine and fractured the rock down to where the miners were working causing the mine to start flooding with water. The explosion was so great, windows all over Nanaimo were shattered, debris was propelled into town, and the post office clock stopped working at 1:55. While there were injuries, the worst being Protection Island blacksmith Dan Grey losing an eye, there were no fatalities.

=== Protection Island mining disaster ===
On 10 September 1918, sixteen men lost their lives when the hoisting cable frayed on the cab that was lowering miners into the mine. All sixteen men's bodies were mangled beyond recognition. Clothing and personal effects had to be used to count and identify bodies. It was later determined that salt water in the air had caused corrosion of the cable leading to the accident.

== Gallows Point Lightkeeper's Cottage ==
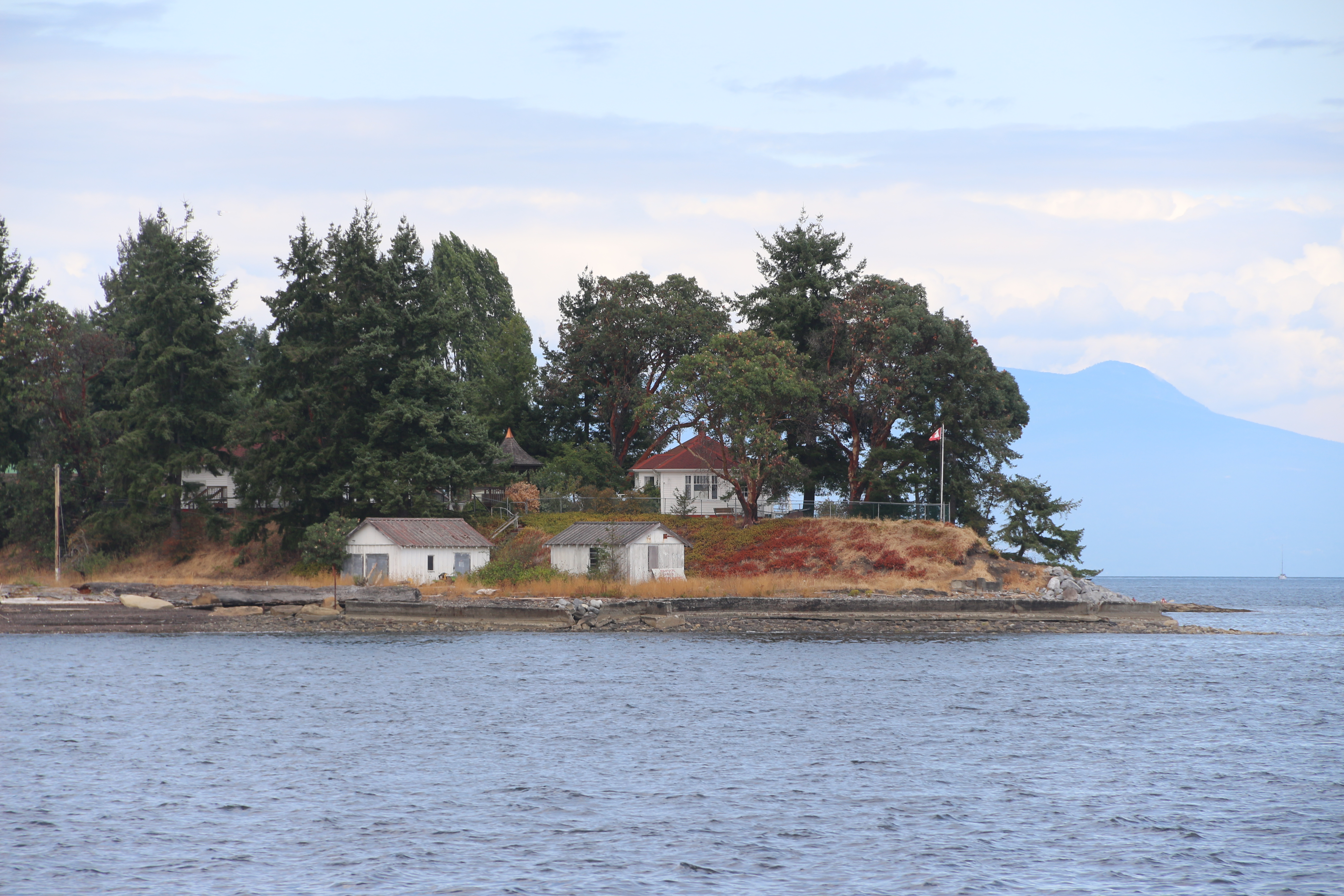
Gallows Point Lightkeeper's Cottage

Gallows Point Lightkeeper's Cottage is located at Gallows Point and was built around 1912. It is in the Canadian Register of Historic Places and was formally recognised on 19 July 2002. It is a one-storey, Edwardian cottage and the historic place is confined to the building footprint and adjacent two-acre grounds. The cottage was abandoned in about 1980 when the lighthouse was automated and the site is now owned by the municipality.

== Parks on the island ==
There are several parks on the island. All of them were given a pirate themed name by the developer, Frank Ney. Parks include, Pirates Park, Captain Flint Park, Captain Morgan Park, Captain Hook Park, Ben Gunn Park, Blackbeard Park, Hidden Treasure Park, Long John Silver Park, and Gallows Point Light Park.

== See also ==
- 1887 Nanaimo mine explosion
- Newcastle Island Marine Provincial Park
- List of historic places in the Nanaimo Regional District
