= Mount Ophir, California =

Ghost town in California, United States

Coordinates: 37°30′53″N 120°03′53″W

Mount Ophir is a ghost town in Mariposa County, California, United States. It was a mining town founded in 1850 during the California Gold Rush, and was allegedly the site of the first authorized mint in California.

== History ==
Mount Ophir during the early 1850s was a large camp, and stores and tents straggled along the main road for quite a distance. In 1854, Louis Trabucco purchased the stone-walled trading post in Mount Ophir, which was patronized by miners and packers. Its ruins now stand next to the foundation of a large two-store frame hotel built in 1852. The Post Office opened in 1852 under the name "Ophir" but was changed in 1856 to "Mount Ophir" because of the name conflict with Ophir in Placer County.

Several sources have claimed that the first mint in California existed at Mount Ophir and struck octagonal $50 coins. Numismatist Q. David Bowers claims that no records exist of coinage being struck.

== See also ==
- History of Mariposa County, California
- Mining communities of the California Gold Rush
