= 1851 $50 Humbert =

The 1851 Humbert $50 gold ingot was an ingot produced by Moffat and Company, under the direction of Augustus Humbert (U.S. Assayer of the treasury) This "coin", while technically an ingot, was still used and unofficially considered currency. It was also the largest ingot produced during the California Gold Rush, weighing almost 2.5 oz.

During the gold rush of 1849, the US Treasury department hired private companies to mint coins before they could properly set up a mint. The U.S. Treasury was much more practical and would often mint coins near the location of the precious metals used in the coins, however, this did not always happen overnight. Augustus Humbert, who was originally a watchmaker from NY, took a lifestyle change and moved out to California during the gold rush in 1850. The U.S. Treasury had commissioned him to be an assayer. One of the first necessities was a mint to produce the octagonal ingots.

The original mint, to be built, was for Moffat and Company was called the Mount Ophir Mint. This was only a temporary mint before a real branch mint of the treasury could be built and commissioned into service. The ironic part is that despite Moffat and Company producing the $50 Dollar Ingots, they didn't have their mint mark or name stamped on the gold (until the $10 gold coin produced in 1852).

These $50 Ingots are very rare and prices can range anywhere from $10,000 and up. Currently, the auction record stands at $14,460,000. Another high profile auction record was made in a 2008 auction by Bowers and Merena. This particular specimen is among the finest known of its variety, professionally graded by NGC, at a grade of MS-65. (The only MS-65 known to exist of its variety) NGC Chairman Mark Salzburg called it "the most memorable coin I have graded all year".

Photo of 1851 Humbert $50 Ingot

== Sources ==
- The Official Red Book. A Guide to United States Coins. R.S. Yeoman
- Augustus Humbert and the United States Assay Office
- Recently Certified "New Discovery" 1851 Augustus Humbert $50 Gold Graded NGC MS 65* | NGC
- 1851 Augustus Humbert $50 Gold Piece Realizes $460K, Bowers and Merena Coin Rarities Sale Totals Over $3.3M
- Bonhams : $50 Augustus Humbert, Reeded Edge, 880 THOUS. MS61 NGC
- The Call of Gold (1936), “8. California’s First Authorized Mint and Early Mining Code,” by Newell D. Chamberlain
