= Old San Francisco Mint =

Building

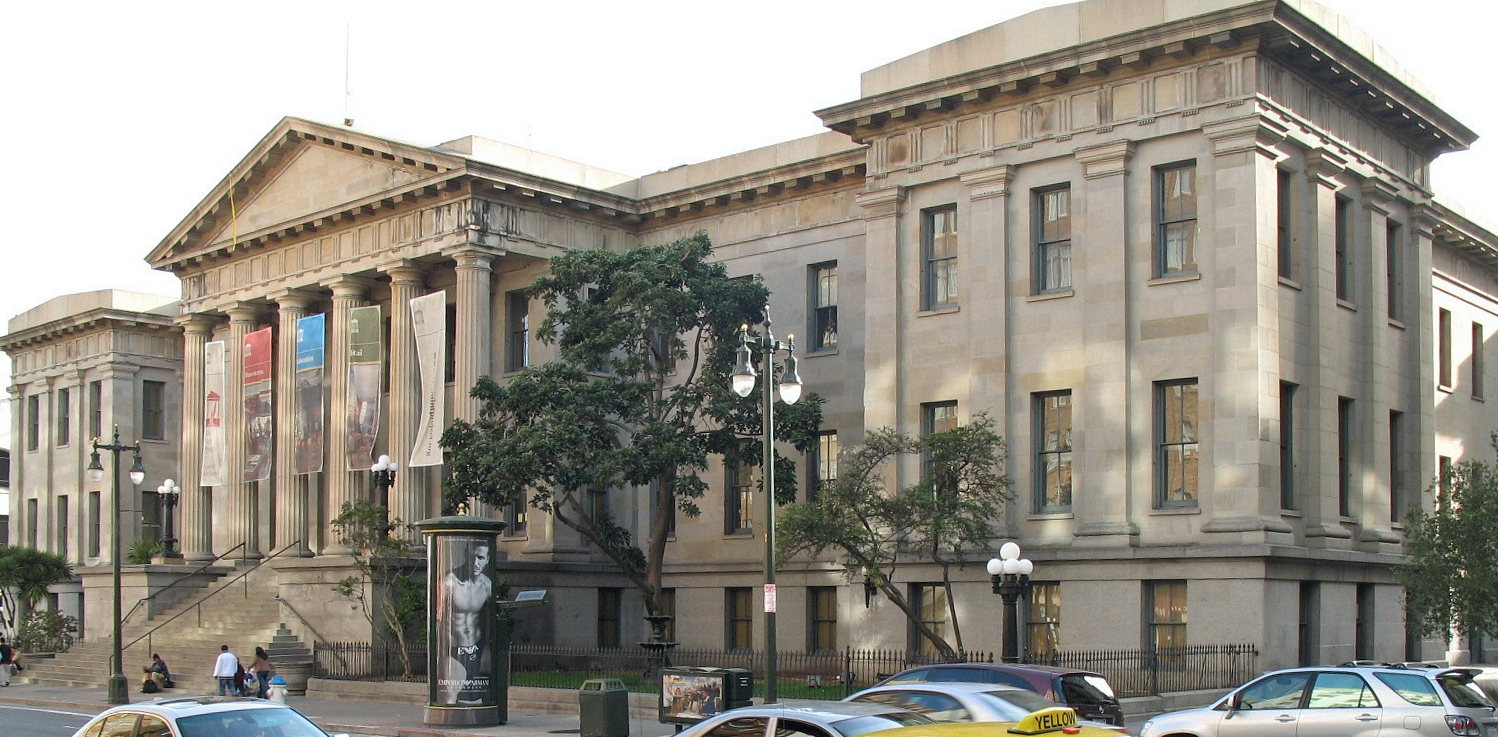
- The Old San Francisco Mint
- Alternative names: The Granite Lady, Old Mint

General information
- Architectural style: Greek Revival architecture
- Location: Fifth and Mission Streets, San Francisco, California, 88 5th St, San Francisco, CA 94103, San Francisco, United States
- Coordinates: 37°46′58″N 122°24′26″W
- Construction started: April 1, 1869
- Completed: November 1874
- Cost: $2,130,512.

Height
- Roof: 52.5 Feet

Design and construction
- Architect: Alfred B. Mullett
- Old United States Mint (San Francisco)
- U.S. National Register of Historic Places
- U.S. National Historic Landmark
- California Historical Landmark
- San Francisco Designated Landmark
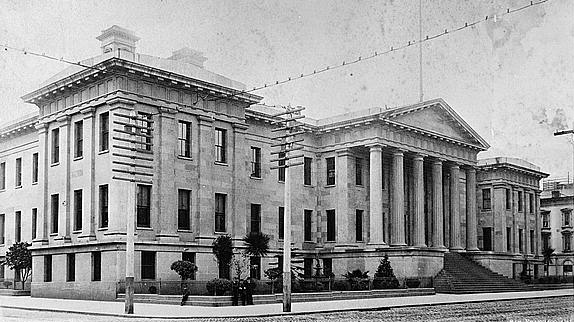
- The old San Francisco Mint building, built in 1874
- NRHP reference No.: 66000231
- CHISL No.: 875
- SFDL No.: 236

Significant dates
- Added to NRHP: October 15, 1966
- Designated NHL: July 4, 1961
- Designated CHISL: 1974
- Designated SFDL: 2003

The Old San Francisco Mint (also Old United States Mint or simply Old Mint, nicknamed The Granite Lady) is a building that served as the location of the San Francisco branch of the United States Mint from 1874 until 1937. The building is one of the few that survived the great 1906 San Francisco earthquake and resulting fire. It was designated a National Historic Landmark in 1961, and as a California Historical Landmark in 1974.

== History ==
=== Construction ===
The Old San Francisco Mint was the second building of the San Francisco branch, replacing the original building which had been built in 1854. The new building, which started construction on April 1, 1869, and was completed in November, 1874, was designed by Alfred B. Mullett in a conservative Greek Revival style with a sober Doric order. The cost of the building was $2,130,512. The building had a central pedimented portico flanked by projecting wings in an E-shape; it was built around a completely enclosed central courtyard. The roof is an average of 52.5 feet in height.

=== Fire of 1906 ===
The central courtyard contained a well which helped save the structure during the fire of 1906, when the heat melted the plate glass windows. It exploded sandstone and granite blocks with which the building was faced. The building was based on a concrete and granite foundation, designed to thwart tunneling into its vaults. At the time of the 1906 fire, it held $300 million, fully a third of the United States' gold reserves. Efforts by Superintendent Frank A. Leach and his men preserved the building and the bullion that then backed the nation's currency. The mint resumed operation soon thereafter, continuing until 1937 when it was replaced by the current San Francisco Mint building.

=== Post-Mint uses ===
In 1961 the Old Mint, as it had become known, was designated as a National Historic Landmark. It was designated as a California Historical Landmark in 1974.

"The Granite Lady" nickname is inaccurate, as most of the building is made from sandstone, quarried from Newcastle Island, British Columbia. The entire external and upper stories are made of sandstone, built above a granite basement. 'The Granite Lady' was a marketing term given in the 1970s, and it became popular. The Old Mint was open to visitors until 1993, and had exhibits interpreting its history.

In 2003 the federal government sold the structure to the City of San Francisco for one dollar—an 1879 silver dollar struck at the mint— for use as a historical museum. It was to be called the San Francisco Museum at the Mint.

In the fall of 2005, ground was broken for renovations to adapt the central court as a glass-enclosed galleria. In 2006 Congress created the San Francisco Old Mint Commemorative Coin, the first coin to honor a United States mint (Pub. L. 109–230 (text) (PDF)). The first phase of renovations was completed in 2011.

=== Current status ===
In 2014, the San Francisco Museum and Historical Society began raising money for the second phase, to include permanent exhibitions. In 2015, the City of San Francisco looked for a new tenant to renovate and program the space. The organization, Activate San Francisco Events, was chosen as an interim tenant.

In 2016 to celebrate the public re-opening, on the first weekend in March, the Old Mint hosted a "San Francisco History Days" event; more than 60 historic organizations participated. Until a new tenant is found, the Old Mint will continue to be used for special events, some open to the public. In April 2016, the California Historical Society agreed to undertake restoration of the building and its preservation as a public space.
