= Saysutshun (Newcastle Island Marine) Park =

Provincial park in British Columbia, Canada

Saysutshun (Newcastle Island Marine) Provincial Park
- IUCN category II (national park)
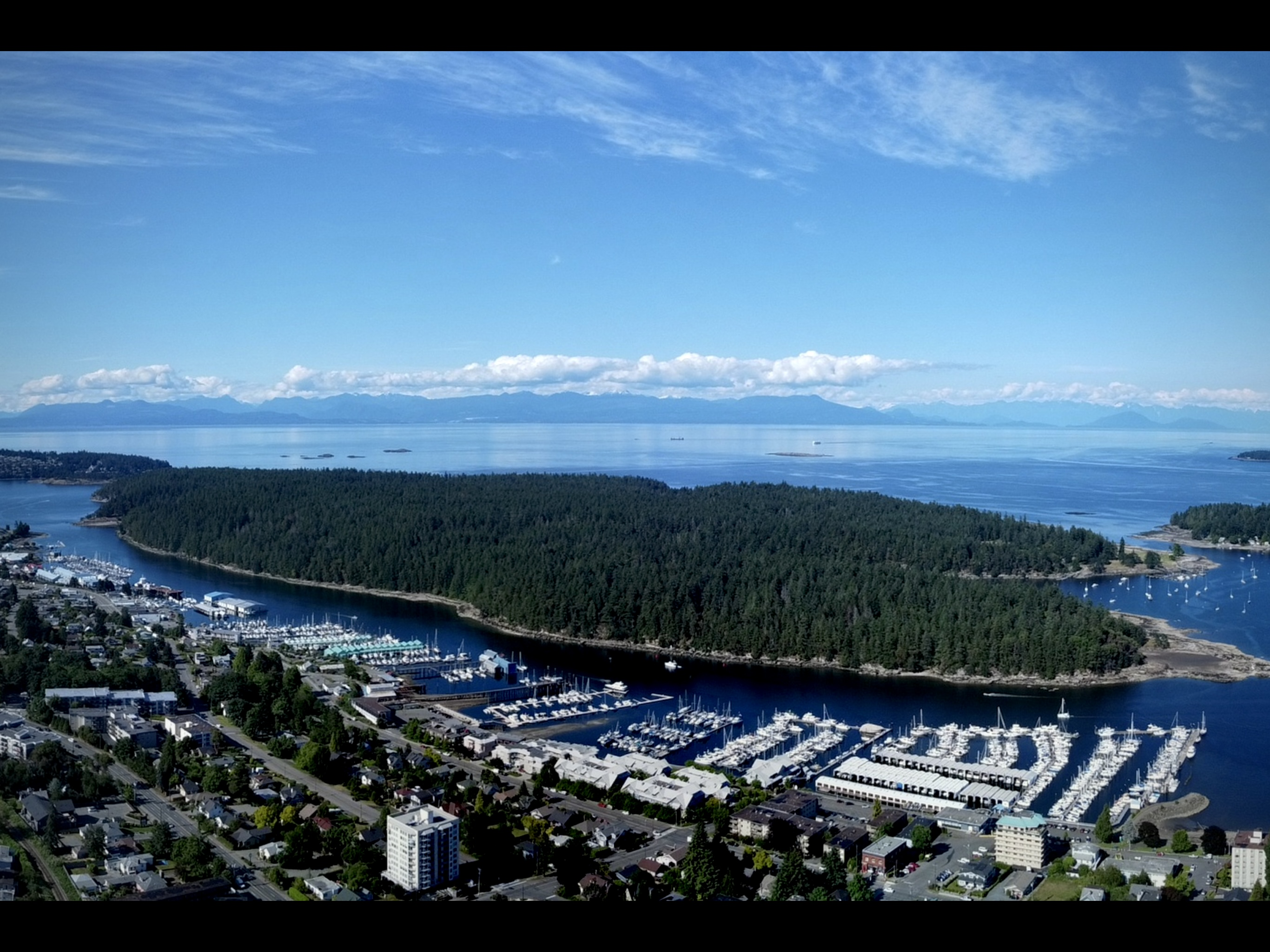
- Panoramic view (2021)

- Location within Vancouver Island Location within British Columbia
- Interactive map of Saysutshun (Newcastle Island Marine) Provincial Park
- Location: British Columbia, Canada
- Nearest city: Nanaimo
- Coordinates: 49°11′29″N 123°56′10″W
- Area: 3.63 km^{2} (1.40 sq mi)
- Established: 17 October 1961
- Governing body: BC Parks

Saysutshun (Newcastle Island Marine) Provincial Park, formerly known as Newcastle Island Marine Provincial Park, is a provincial park located on Newcastle Island, a small island off the coast of Nanaimo, British Columbia, Canada.

== History ==
Saysutshun Island has been used by the Coast Salish peoples as a seasonal fishing site for thousands of years.

European explorers, including members of the Hudson's Bay Company (HBC), initially assumed the island was uninhabited. Owing to the abundant fish population, they established a herring industry in the region, constructing salteries and fisheries on the northwestern coast of the island.

Ki’et’sa’kun, a Snuneymuxw man, told the English about coal on the island, and they gave him the nickname "Coal Tyee" as a result. Coal mining became the primary industry in Nanaimo in the late nineteenth century. The HBC, aware of the importance of coal, named this island for Newcastle upon Tyne, an English area of coal production.

While mining for coal, the island's sandstone was found to be of exceptional quality and was soon quarried for other uses: construction of buildings in cities across Canada and other countries. Many companies competed for leases of land for access to cut the Newcastle Island stone.

The timber industry also sought this stone to use as pulp stones to grind tree fibres into pulp for paper-making. While industrial uses predominated for years, the Canadian Pacific Railway envisioned the island as a tourist and resort destination. After a decrease in popularity with competition from other sites and a decline in train passenger travel, the railroad sold the island to the city of Nanaimo. They eventually sold it to the BC Government, who adapted it as a marine park.

=== Before European contact ===
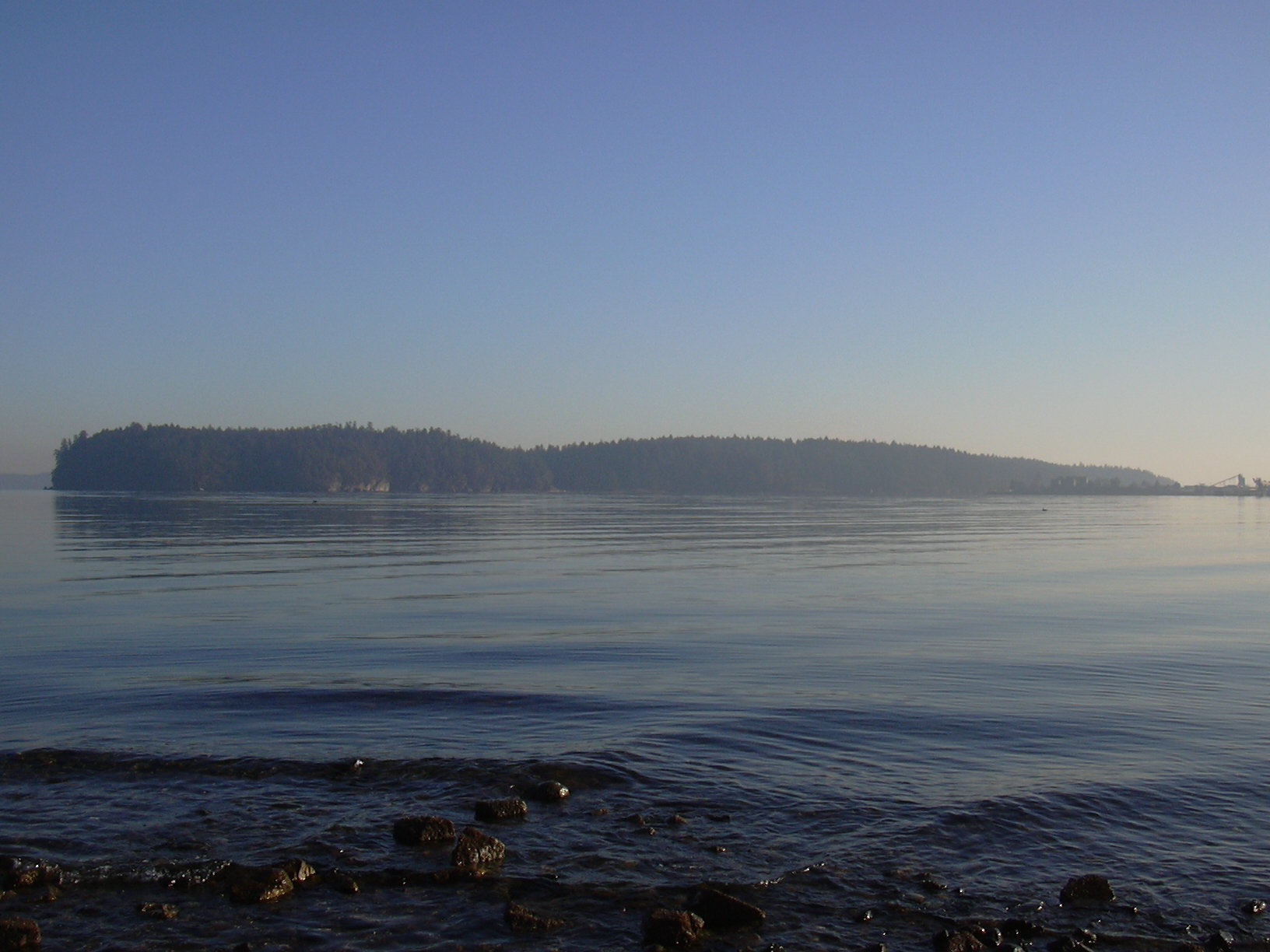
Saysutshun Island viewed from Departure Bay Beach, Nanaimo (2002)

The Snuneymuxw, the Nanaimo branch of the Coast Salish linguistic group, had two villages on Saysutshun Island. Saysetsen, located on the east side of the island facing nearby Protection Island near Midden Bay, had easy access to the herring that spawned in the Gap during late winter and early spring. The Snuneymuxw traditionally harvested herring using hardwood sticks inlaid with sharp whalebone teeth along one side, which were struck into the water to spear ten to twelve fish at a time, allowing canoes to be filled quickly.

They lived at Saysetsen seasonally, from January to April, in order to catch the spawning herring. Later they moved to a seasonal village at Gabriola Island, where they would stay until early August. They traversed the Strait of Georgia to the mouth of the Fraser River, where they stayed until the end of August in order to catch spawning sockeye and humpback salmon. Next, they returned to Vancouver Island for the chum salmon run. In January, they would begin the cycle again on Saysutshun Island. Clotsun, the other village, had a name meaning Protector.

The Snuneymuxw placed their deceased in trees, where birds and animals would gradually strip the bodies. In the 19th century, there was a popular belief that they had buried their dead in chests in caves on Newcastle Island.

=== Coal industry at Newcastle Island and Nanaimo ===
English officials of the Hudson's Bay Company named the island Newcastle after the discovery of coal here in 1849. It was named for the noted mining town of Newcastle upon Tyne, Northumberland, England. The discovery of coal here gave the British a source on the west coast of North America for fuel for their steamships and later railroads. Mining was established at Fort Rupert in 1830, but the quality of coal at Newcastle Island was superior and superseded it.

Native chief Ki’et’sa’kun is credited with telling the English about coal in 1849–1850. He was said to have seen a blacksmith in Fort Victoria using coal in his fire. Ki’et’sa’kun told the man he knew of a site with abundant coal. He was given a bottle of rum and free gun repair if he could bring proof of his claim back to Fort Victoria. In April 1850, approximately fifteen months after he first spoke to the blacksmith, Ki’et’sa’kun returned with a canoe full of coal. Joseph McKay, a Hudson's Bay Company clerk, was told and was sent to investigate. This coal proved to be superior to the coal being mined at Fort Rupert.

The British did not establish a mine on Newcastle Island until 1852. When the first mine was sunk there, workers produced 50 tons of coal in one day. In honour of Ki’et’sa’kun's find, the English called him 'Coal Tyee', meaning Great Coal Chief. McKay Point was named for Joseph McKay.

The two mines on Newcastle Island were called the Fitzwilliam and the Newcastle mines. The Newcastle Mine was open from 1853 to 1856 and was along the Newcastle seam. The Fitzwilliam Mine, located along the Douglas seam, was worked from 1872 to 1882. Both seams ran across the island and to Nanaimo. Coal was also found in a seam that extended to Protection Island.

In the month of September 1852 alone, 480 barrels of coal collected from surface seams were shipped from Newcastle Island to Victoria; that year's total production was 200 tons. In the beginning, native Snuneymuxw and European (mostly British) miners from Fort Rupert worked the mines but, by 1854, miners were recruited from England. They lived in Nanaimo with their families and worked 14-day shifts in camps on Newcastle Island.

In 1862, the Hudson's Bay Company sold their coalfields, including Newcastle Island, to the Vancouver Coal Mining and Land Company. This was shortly before workers struck over the continuing poor conditions of the Nanaimo and Newcastle Island mines. There were no routine safety checks of the mines, and workers believed that unskilled labour endangered all the men. The new Vancouver company discriminated against First Nations and Chinese people in wages: pay for white persons ranged from $1.75 – $3.75/day (many may have had skilled experience in mining), Natives were paid $1.25 – $1.50/day, and Chinese $1.12/day.

Accidents occurred with fatalities among workers. Worker William Beck died in a mine collapse on 10 June 1874. A gas explosion in the Fitzwilliam Mine, on 15 September 1876, resulted in the deaths of three men. This was the first Nanaimo mine to have fatalities from an explosion.

Mine tunnels were constructed beneath the Gap from Newcastle Island to Protection Island, and from Protection Island to Gabriola Island. Miners were said to be able to tell time by distinguishing the sounds of different steamships, whose passage sounded in the mine walls.

=== Sandstone industry ===
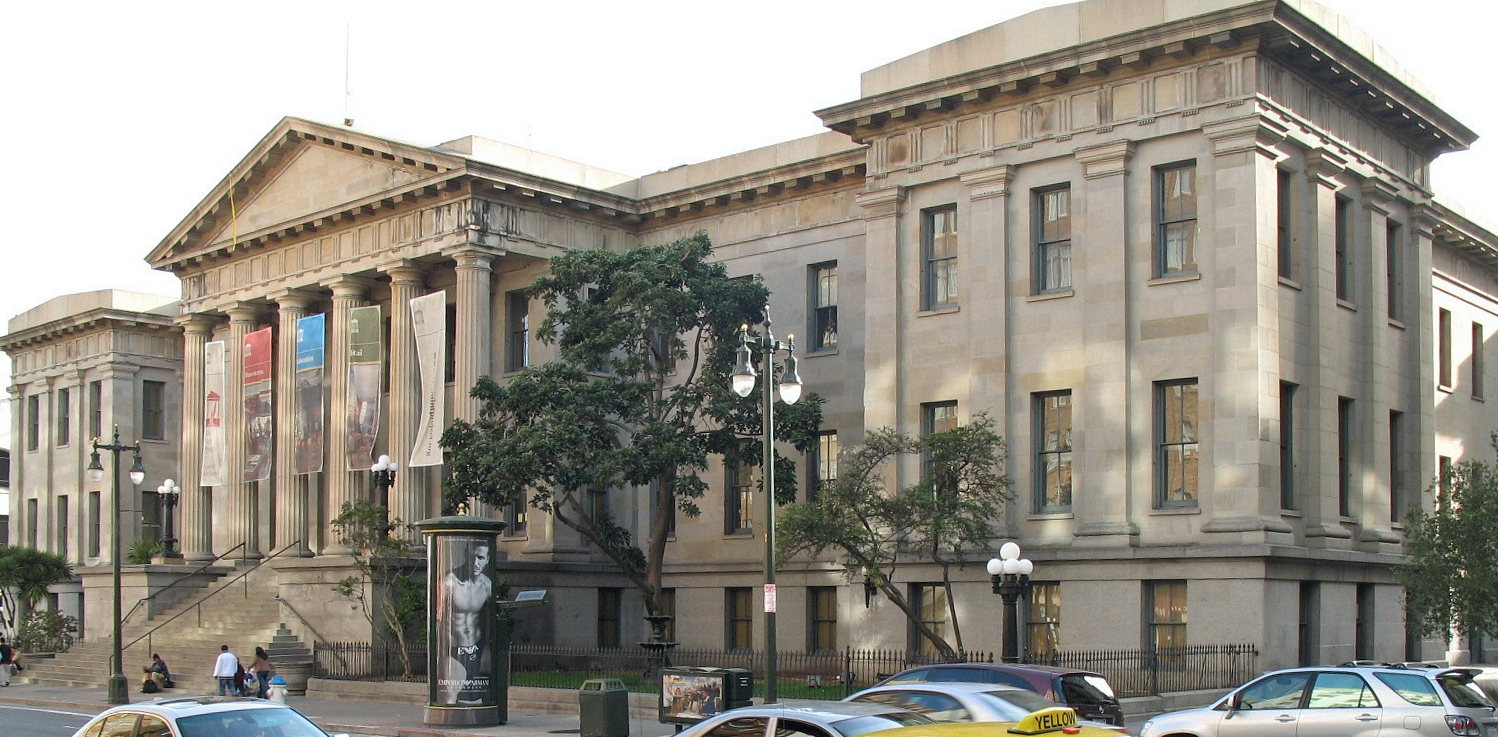
Old San Francisco Mint in San Francisco

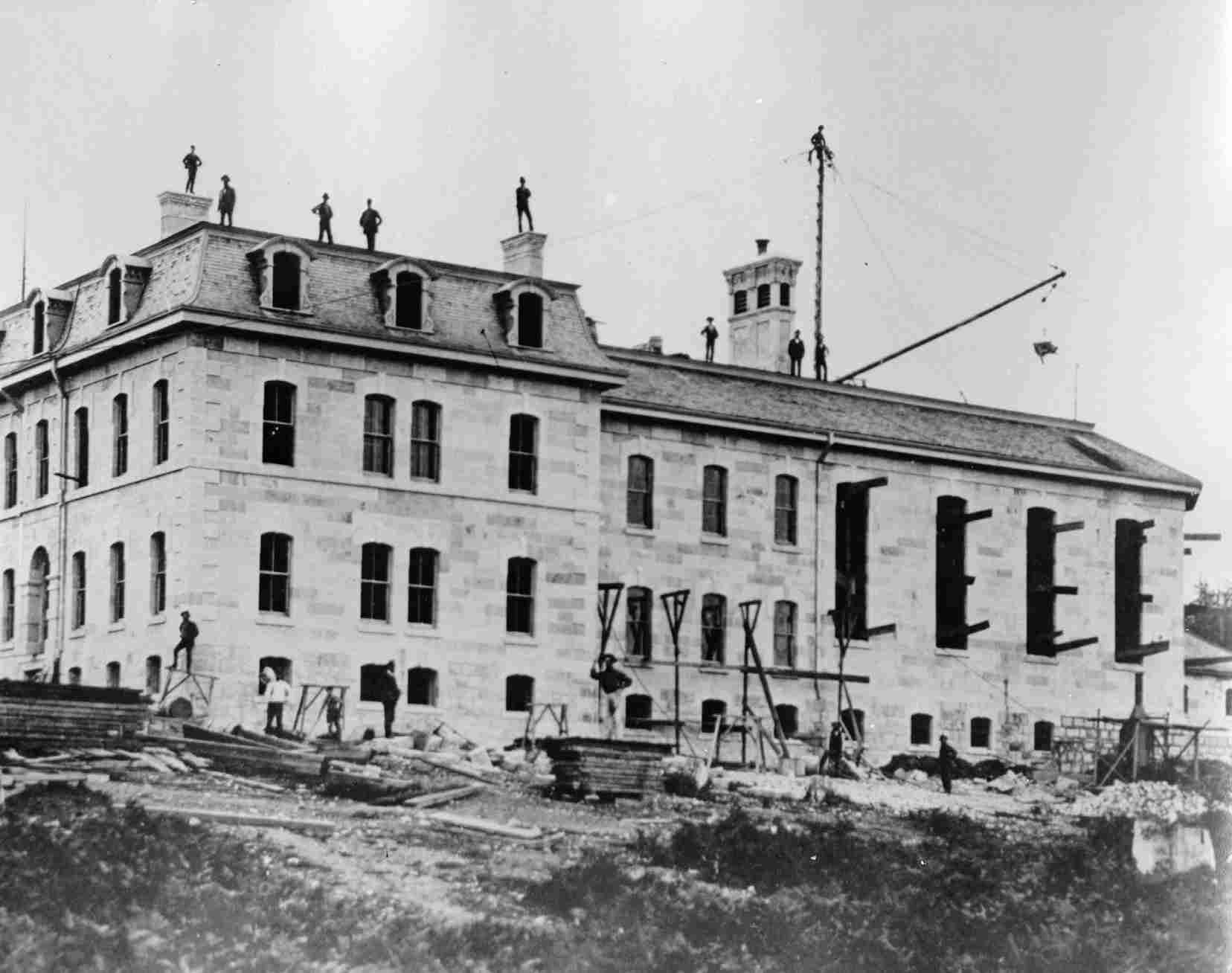
British Columbia Penitentiary in New Westminster

Buildings constructed using Newcastle Sandstone

Sandstone quarrying began on Newcastle Island in 1869 when Joseph Emery from the United States Mint in San Francisco went looking for good quality sandstone for their new building. Finding the stone on Newcastle to be of the desired quality, he signed a five-year lease with the Vancouver Coal Mining and Land Company to cut stone for the building. It was an appealing white-grey colour; it was easy to remove large blocks because its joints and fractures were few and far between; and it was strong and held up well against weathering because of unusually numerous quartz grains.

The first shipment to San Francisco occurred in the mid-1870s and continued throughout the five years to make the grand total of 8,000 tons of sandstone removed from Newcastle Island. This stone was used for the building's six columns along the front. They are 27 feet 6 inches (8.38 m) long and 3 feet 10 inches (1.17 m) in diameter. The San Francisco Mint has survived two major earthquakes. The San Francisco Mint is no longer in use as an office building and is designated as a National Historic Landmark and museum.

The U.S. Mint was planned to have eight columns, but two were lost in a shipwreck. A three-masted barque built in Medford, Massachusetts in 1855, the Zephyr arrived at Newcastle Island on 31 January 1872, to transport two of the eight sandstone pillars to San Francisco for the new building. It left Departure Bay at 10:00 a.m. on 12 February in stormy weather. The following Monday at 3:30 in the morning, it hit bottom at Mayne Island. Captain Hepson and mate James Stewart drowned, but the rest of the crew made it ashore safely. The Zephyr is commemorated on Newcastle Island with an exhibit about the ship that includes one of the sandstone columns recovered from the wrecked Zephyr.

Other companies acquired leases on the island to cut its sandstone, which was quarried until 1932. Structures in British Columbia built with Newcastle sandstone include: the BC Penitentiary in New Westminster; both the Nanaimo Post Office and the Court House; the British North American Bank of Vancouver; and both the St. John's Church and the Odd Fellows Hall in Victoria.

== Industry ==
=== Pulp-stone quarrying ===
The immense forestry industry on the West Coast processed timber in numerous mills, including some to produce paper and pulp. Pulp stones were used to grind the wood chips into pulp. In 1923, the McDonald Cut-Stone Company was founded to profit from the pulp-stone industry. To cut the stone they would first use plaster of Paris to level the cutting area, then use the cutting machines that would rotate slowly to cut a 40-inch (1.0-metre) deep, 54-inch (1.4 m) diameter stone in just 45 minutes. After the circular cut had been made, small charges of gunpowder would be placed in holes drilled at the base of the stone to break it free. A derrick would lift the free stone before the final cuts were made, and a lathe could complete the smoothing process. The finished product would be 18–20 in (0.46–0.51 m) high with a 48 in (1.2 m) diameter.

This was a successful business on Newcastle Island until 1932. At that time, the company moved operations to Gabriola Island. Later in the 20th century, the industry converted to the use of artificial stones. These could be made relatively cheaply and would last four to five years, in contrast to the three to twenty-month-use period of sandstone.

=== Herring salteries ===
In the early 20th century, the influence of Asian immigrants, the majority being Japanese, and their salteries off the coast of Nanaimo was already well established. The major buyers for the salted herring and salmon were from Japan, Hong Kong, and China. Herring season went from December to February every year, but in the 1920s, the season was extended to include September, November, and October. The salmon season began in July and went until mid-August, which worked out well for the saltery owners because they could use the same facilities for both herring and salmon, seeing as they were caught at different times of the year.

In order to catch the herring, the Japanese had a way of fishing called seining. Seining involved the use of two identical sister ships, one strengthened on the port side and the other on the starboard. They would then surround the school of herring with a net and then close it up.

On 12 July 1912, four of the salteries on Newcastle Island burnt down, totalling over $21,000 worth of damage. The salteries were owned by Mr. Oburi, Mr. Mase, Mr. Shinobu, and Mr. Makino, all of whom were issei (first-generation Japanese-Canadians). The salteries were quickly rebuilt, but the cause of the fires was unknown and arson was suspected.

In 1918, T. Matsuyama and the Ode brothers got together and started the Nanaimo Shipyards Limited. Nanaimo Shipyards Limited was a shipbuilding and repair shop located on Newcastle Island. The company gained popularity and was growing rapidly. In 1939, the main shed was 24 by 24 ft (7.3 by 7.3 m) and by 1941, the company owned 16 boats and 4.18 acres (17,000 m^{2}) of the island. All this was taken from them in 1941, at the start of World War II, along with Mr. Tanaka's and Mr. Kasho's salteries, when the Japanese-Canadians were sent to the Interior of British Columbia to be placed in internment camps.

=== Peter Kakua the Kanaka ===
In the mid-nineteenth century, Hawaiian immigrant labourers, known as Kanakas, worked for the Hudson's Bay Company and the North West Company on a term basis. Once their term was completed, they were free to go wherever they pleased. Many returned home to Hawaii (then known as the Sandwich Islands), but others stayed in British Columbia. Peter Kakua was one of the many Hawaiians who married and settled in BC, having children and starting a family.

Kakua started working for the Hudson's Bay Company in 1853 and served in Fort Victoria under Governor James Douglas. After he left his position in the HBC, he moved to Nanaimo, There he met and married his wife, Que-en, also known as Mary, who was of aboriginal descent. They had a daughter in 1868.

On 7 December 1868, Kakua pleaded guilty to murder. He confessed that Que-en had decided to leave him and take their daughter, so he went drinking. After returning home the night of 3 December, he found her and her parents, mother Sqush-e-lek and father Shil-at-ti-nord, packing her belongings. He left the house again, but when he returned at two in the morning, he found his father-in-law in bed with Que-en. In a fit of rage, Kakua killed everyone in the house with an axe, including his daughter. Realizing what he had done, he went to see his friend Stephany. Kakua said that he needed to escape to the mainland. Stephany was also drunk and did not want to go that far. He helped Kakua row a boat to what is now Kanaka Bay on Newcastle Island.

There he was found and captured on 4 December. He tried to escape custody on the boat ride back to Nanaimo, but he was hit by a paddle and recaptured.

Kakua was tried by Joseph Needham, known as "the hanging judge", on 10 February 1869. The judge concluded the trial that day, saying, "Peter Kakua we find you guilty as charged of four counts of murder and sentence you to be hanged by the neck until dead". He was hanged on Friday, 10 March 1869, at Gallows Point on Protection Island, across the Gap from Newcastle. His body was buried in an unmarked grave near Kanaka Bay because both the Native people and Europeans rejected his being buried in their sacred areas.

On 4 October 1899, a body was dug up close to Kanaka Bay. It was believed to be that of Peter P. Kakua. He was reburied nearby.

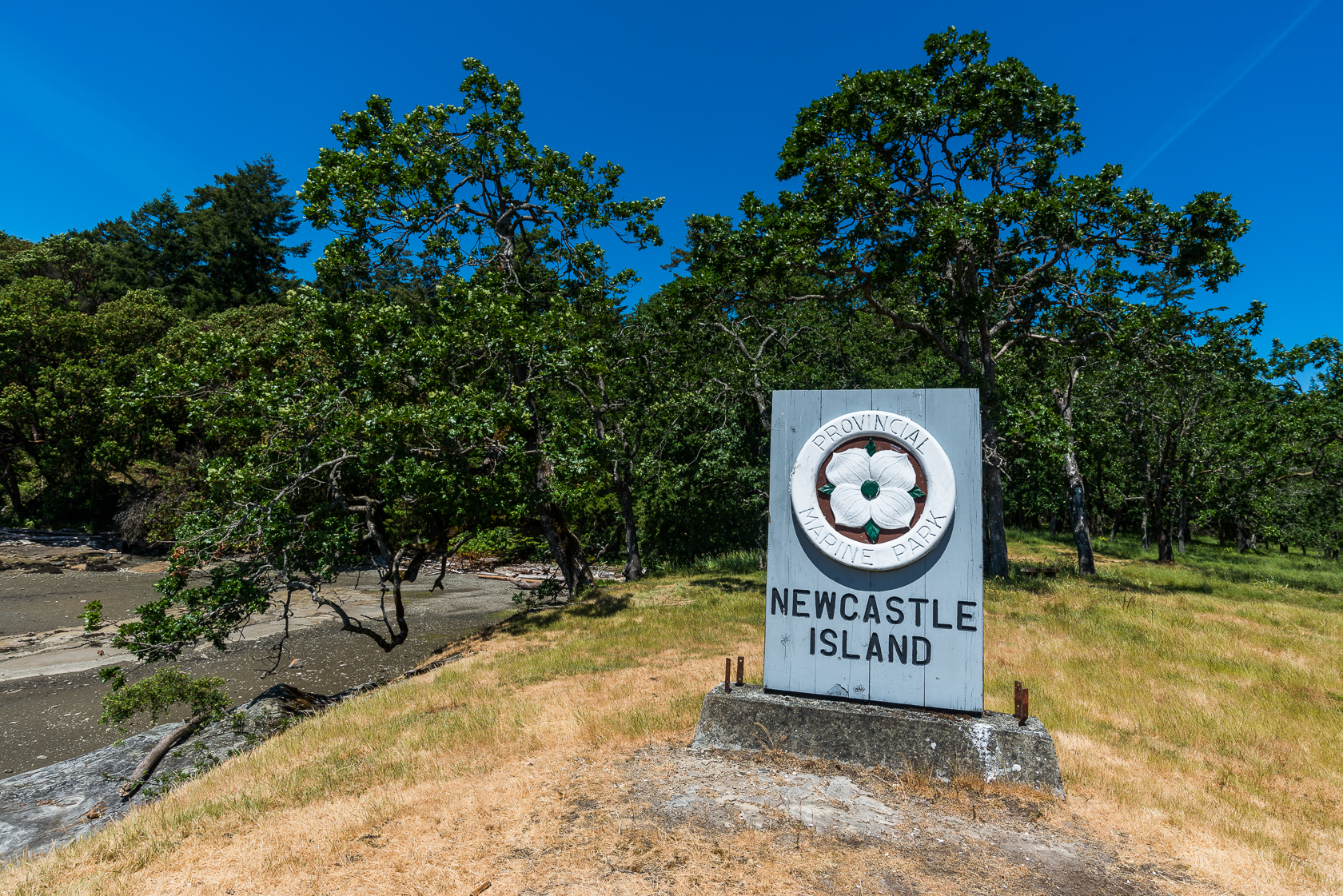
Newcastle Island Provincial Marine Park sign

=== CPR resort ===
The Canadian Pacific Railway (CPR), owned and operated the British Columbia Coast Steamship Service (BCCSS). Their Princess steamships travelled the inland waters and competed with the Union Steamship Company of British Columbia for business. The Union Steamship Co bought 1,000 acres (4.0 km^{2}) of land on Bowen Island to develop as a recreational day-trio destination for people of Vancouver. As it was a great success, and the BCCSS began to seek property it could develop. They began looking for possible locations on the islands around Nanaimo, such as Taylor Bay on Gabriola Island, but decided on Newcastle Island.

In 1930, the BCCSS bought Newcastle Island from the Western Fuel Corporation of Canada for $30,000. They invested another $100,000 in developing the facilities they wanted. The main attraction was the pavilion. It had a soda fountain and a spring-loaded dance floor. They also built picnic shelters and a bathhouse. They introduced muskrats and beavers to the island for the tourists to watch. By spending $50,000, they built a dock in Mark Bay for their "floating hotels".

The retired steamship, the Charmer, made its 3,000th voyage in 1902. It was used as an automobile ferry from Vancouver to Nanaimo until the Princess Elaine took over. It was the first ship used on Newcastle Island as a hotel, and the first ship in British Columbia to have electric lights. People could stay there for a week for $7.50. Other boats, such as the Princess Elizabeth, the Princess Joan, and the Princess Victoria, transported people there and back at a cost of $1.35 round trip. The Princess Victoria could make the Vancouver–Nanaimo voyage in 2 hours 19 minutes, which is not much slower than the current BC Ferries' runs. The Princess Victoria was also eventually used as a floating hotel.

The CPR resort on Newcastle Island was a success. It officially opened on Saturday, 20 July 1931. In that first season, some 14,323 visitors went to the island, spending a total of $21,762.35. It was not uncommon to see 1500 picnickers on the island at one time. At the start of World War II, the Princess ships were reassigned for military use and tourists could no longer visit the island.

The Newcastle Island pavilion is the only pavilion of its kind that has survived from the island resort era between the two world wars. It was restored in 1984.

=== Nanaimo Ownership and selling to the Provincial Government ===
When the CPR decided that the resort was not making enough money, they asked the city of Nanaimo whether they would like to buy the island. The deal went through in 1955 and the island was sold for $150,000. The City of Nanaimo had a hard time maintaining the island, and they fell into debt. On 17 December 1959, a referendum was put to the people about selling the island to the Provincial Department of Recreation and Conservation for development as a Provincial Park. Voters responded with 86.8% 'yes' votes.

The BC government agreed to purchase the property with these six conditions:

1. The island would become a marine park and, if it or any part of it stopped being a marine park, it shall "revert to the Corporation of the City of Nanaimo".
2. The government would take possession of the island and its facilities, and the responsibilities that go with the possession, as of 1 April 1960.
3. That access by bridge would be provided as soon as possible. Until that time, access would be maintained and be equal to or greater than that provided by the City of Nanaimo in 1959.
4. The government must prepare a master plan for Newcastle Island's development. The City of Nanaimo would get to see this master plan and approve it before it was carried out.
5. Until the master plan is finished, the facilities must be maintained and operated at a level that is equal to or greater than that provided by the City of Nanaimo.
6. That the development of Newcastle Island into a marine park would happen as soon as possible, and that preliminary development would begin in 1960.

These conditions were agreed upon on 30 October 1959. The park would be sold to the government for $1 plus the mortgage on 1 April 1960.

Development began that year to make Newcastle Island into a class A provincial park. Earle C. Westwood, Minister of Recreation and Conservation, said that Newcastle Island would be the "gem of Vancouver Island" and the "Stanley Park of Vancouver Island". Although the government did try to fulfill all their agreements, correspondence between the Minister of Recreation and Conservation and Nanaimo Alderman R. A. Brookbank show that the master plan, outlined in both points 4 and 5, had not been created. Later, after the park had been assigned to the Department of Lands, Parks and Housing rather than the Ministry of Recreation and Conservation, Brookbank continued to send letters of inquiry about the master place to the Deputy Minister Chris Grey. He responded that the plan would take a year to develop, but that had been the answer 20 years before. It is unknown whether a master plan was ever devised by the BC government.

In May 1983, the city of Nanaimo Ad Hoc Committee made their own plan. Their goals were "to provide the people of BC and particularly the Nanaimo area, a range of year-round recreation, historic, and natural history opportunities" and "to protect and develop the ability of the natural and cultural resources of the park to provide such opportunities in perpetuity". Many of this committee's ideas and suggestions were carried out, but some were not. There has never been sport fishing on Mallard Lake and there has never been a designated volleyball area. The committee also addressed the issue of the bridge. They felt that a bridge would not meet the park's objectives and would generally be a bad idea.

The park has been co-managed through a tripartite agreement between BC Parks, the city of Nanaimo, and Snuneymuxw First Nation since 2003.

In 2021, the park was renamed as Saysutshun (Newcastle Island Marine) Park to acknowledge its first inhabitants, the Snuneymuxw people.

== Current uses ==
Currently, no one except park authorities live on Newcastle Island. The original First Nations peoples who inhabited the island left in 1849 when the Hudson's Bay Company started opening up coal mines. The park has become an extremely popular tourist spot that now caters to hikers, campers, bird watchers, cyclists, and kayakers alike.

Walk-in campsites are available on a first-come, first-served basis. Mooring buoys are available without reservation, however many boating visitors anchor in the area between Newcastle Island and Protection Island. A visitor may find space at the dock to tie up if there is a space free. A fee is charged for camping, mooring to a buoy, and overnight use of the dock.

== Transportation ==
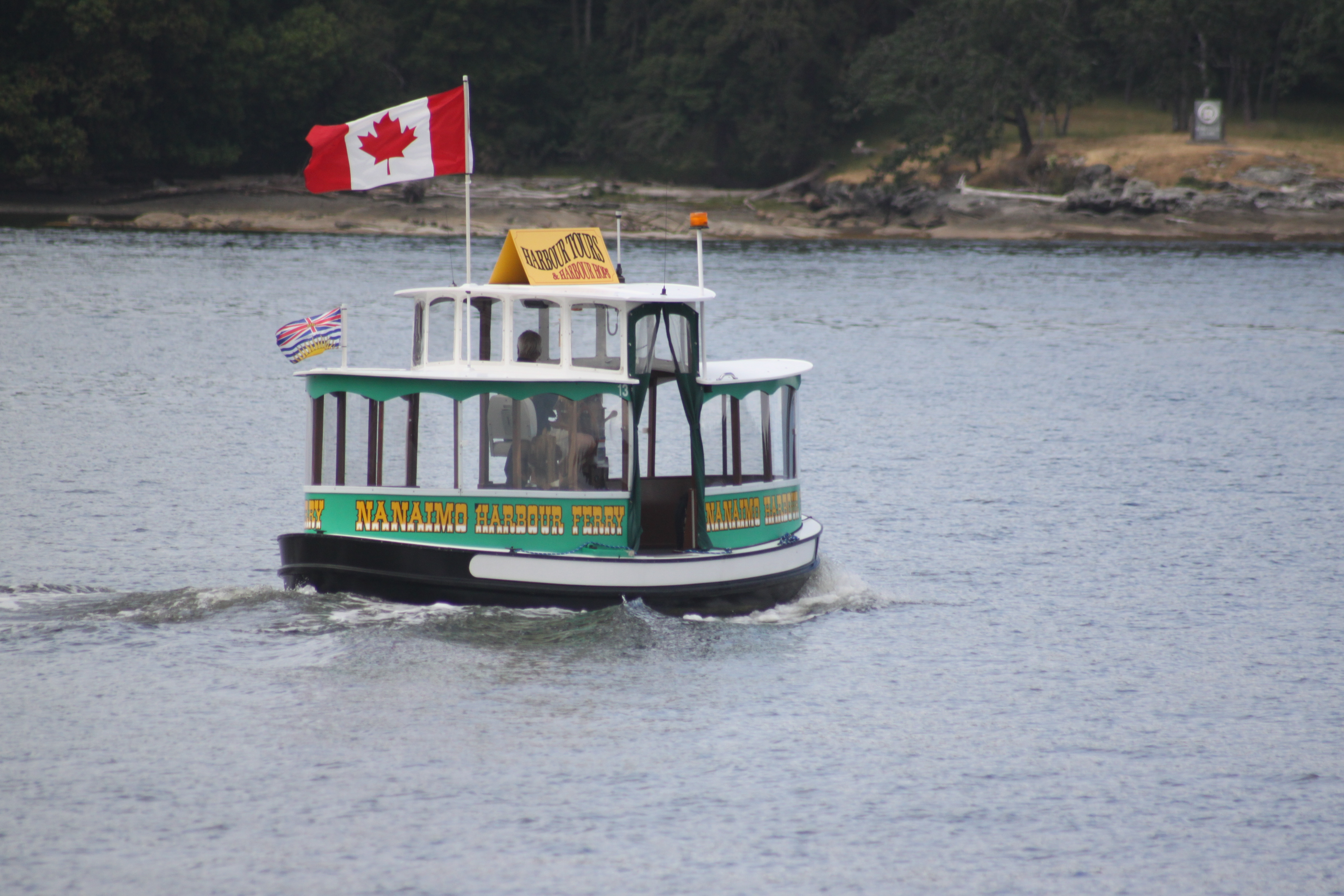
Newcastle Island Ferry

Newcastle Island (Saysutshun) is accessible only by water. A foot-passenger ferry crosses in ten minutes from downtown Nanaimo at Maffeo Sutton Park to the southern end of the island. It is also a popular destination for kayakers and other boaters. In the summer, at low tide, one can walk across the narrow strait separating it from Protection Island.

== Mallard Lake ==
Since Newcastle Island was originally a resourced-based commercial island with a population of people living there, they needed a water supply. Mallard Lake, near the centre of the island, is an artificial lake created to serve as a reservoir. It now is the centre of a wildlife sanctuary. Bird watching is one of the most popular activities on the island, and Mallard Lake is a prime place for that.

== Bedrock, soils, and vegetation ==
Cretaceous-era sedimentary rock, of which sandstone and conglomerate are most common, form the bedrock of Newcastle Island. The soils are mostly dark grayish brown, dark brown, or brown stony sandy loam which is mapped as well drained Saturna series over sandstone and rapidly drained Salalakim series over conglomerate. These soils support Douglas-fir forests. There is a more limited occurrence of Bellhouse shallow sandy loam which supports Garry oak-grass parkland.

== See also ==
- 1887 Nanaimo mine explosion
- Hudson's Bay Company
- Protection Island
