= List of ship launches in 1964 =

The list of ship launches in 1964 includes a chronological list of all ships launched in 1964.

Date	Ship	Class	Builder	Location	Country	Notes
9 January	Hobart	Perth-class destroyer	Defoe Shipbuilding Company	Bay City, Michigan	United States	For Royal Australian Navy
14 January	Prins Bertil	ferry	Nobiskrug	Rendsburg	West Germany	For Lion Ferry
17 January	Oslo	Oslo-class frigate	Karljohansvern	Horten	Norway	
20 January	Seahorse	Fishing trawler	Brooke Marine Ltd.	Lowestoft	United Kingdom	For Amalgamated Fisheries Co. Pty. Ltd.
27 January	Hazelbank	Cargo ship	Harland & Wolff	Belfast	United Kingdom	For Bank Line.
1 February	Casimir Pulaski	James Madison-class submarine	Electric Boat	Groton, Connecticut	United States	
15 February	Edward McDonnell	Garcia-class frigate	Avondale Shipyard	Avondale, Louisiana	United States	
20 February	KNM Kya	Kobben-class submarine	Nordseewerke	Emden	West Germany	For Royal Norwegian Navy
27 February	Melbrook	Cargo ship	William Denny and Brothers / Alex Stephen & Sons Ltd.	Dumbarton / Linthouse	United Kingdom	For J. A. Billmeir Ltd.
25 March	Cleopatra	Leander-class frigate	HMNB Devonport	Devonport	United Kingdom	
26 March	Bradley	Garcia-class frigate	Bethlehem Steel	San Francisco, California	United States	
4 April	Greenling	Permit-class submarine	Electric Boat	Groton, Connecticut	United States	
4 April	Klaar Kiming	ferry	Husumer Schiffswerft GmbH	Husum	West Germany	For Wyker Dampfschiffs-Reederei Amrum GmbH
14 April	903	Barge	Appledore Shipbuilders Ltd.	Appledore	United Kingdom	For United Africa Co. Ltd.
26 April	Alexander Pushkin	Ivan Franko-class passenger ship	V.E.B. Mathias-Thesen Werft	Wismar	East Germany	For Baltic Shipping Company
28 April	Sample	Garcia-class frigate	Lockheed Shipbuilding	Seattle, Washington	United States	
25 April	KNM Kobben	Kobben-class submarine	Nordseewerke	Emden	West Germany	For Royal Norwegian Navy
26 April	Aleksandr Pushkin	Ivan Franko-class passenger ship	V.E.B. Mathias-Thesen Werft	Wismar	East Germany	For Baltic Shipping Company
29 April	Lingo	Tug	J. Bolson & Son Ltd.	Poole	United Kingdom	For Union Lighterage Co. Ltd.
30 April	Ōshio	Ōshio-class submarine	Mitsubishi Heavy Industries		Japan	
9 May	905	Barge	Appledore Shipbuilders Ltd.	Appledore	United Kingdom	For United Africa Co. Ltd.
11 May	Bowbelle	Suction dredger	Ailsa Shipbuilding Co. Ltd.	Troon	United Kingdom	For F Bowles & Sons Ltd
11 May	Junon	Daphné-class submarine	Direction des Constructions et Armes Navales	Cherbourg	France	For French Navy
11 May	904	Barge	Appledore Shipbuilders Ltd.	Appledore	United Kingdom	For United Africa Co. Ltd.
12 May	Nathanael Greene	James Madison-class submarine	Portsmouth Naval Shipyard	Kittery, Maine	United States	
12 May	Queen of New Westminster	Burnaby-class ferry	Victoria Machinery Co. Depot Ltd.	Victoria	Canada	For BC Ferries
14 May	Gato	Permit-class submarine	Electric Boat	Groton, Connecticut	United States	
21 May	America	Kitty Hawk-class aircraft carrier	Newport News Shipbuilding	Newport News, Virginia	United States	
28 May	Cardiff Castle	Ferry	J. Bolson & Son Ltd.	Poole	United Kingdom	For River Dart Steamboat Co. Ltd.
6 June	Brumby	Garcia-class frigate	Avondale Shipyard	Avondale, Louisiana	United States	
25 June	Irisbank	Cargo ship	Harland & Wolff	Belfast	United Kingdom	For Bank Line.
27 June	Austin	Austin-class amphibious transport dock	New York Naval Shipyard	Brooklyn, New York	United States	
27 June	Ogden	Austin-class amphibious transport dock	New York Naval Shipyard	Brooklyn, New York	United States	
30 June	Jouett	Belknap-class cruiser	Puget Sound Naval Shipyard	Bremerton, Washington	United States	
30 June	Sterett	Belknap-class cruiser	Puget Sound Naval Shipyard	Bremerton, Washington	United States	
30 June	Queen of Nanaimo	Burnaby-class ferry	Victoria Machinery Depot	Victoria, British Columbia	Canada	For BC Ferries
9 July	Glamorgan	County-class destroyer	Vickers-Armstrongs	Newcastle Upon Tyne	United Kingdom	
9 July	Fife	County-class destroyer	Fairfield SB&E Co.	Glasgow	United Kingdom	
16 July	KNM Kunna	Kobben-class submarine	Nordseewerke	Emden	West Germany	For Royal Norwegian Navy
July	Motowco 100	Barge	Alabama Drydock and Shipbuilding Company	Mobile, Alabama	United States	For St. Thomas Lighterage.
6 August	Texaco Maracaibo	Tanker	Harland & Wolff	Belfast	United Kingdom	For Texaco (Panama) Inc.
22 August	Guam	Iwo Jima-class amphibious assault ship	Philadelphia Navy Yard	Philadelphia, Pennsylvania	United States	
22 August	Simon Bolivar	Benjamin Franklin-class submarine	Newport News Shipbuilding	Newport News, Virginia	United States	
24 August	Sokoto	Tug	Appledore Shipbuilders Ltd.	Appledore	United Kingdom	For United Africa Company.
25 August	Taraba	Tug	Appledore Shipbuilders Ltd.	Appledore	United Kingdom	For United Africa Company.
4 September	Trondheim	Oslo-class frigate	Karljohansvern	Horten	Norway	
6 September	Bindo	Tug	Appledore Shipbuilders Ltd.	Appledore	United Kingdom	For United Africa Company.
22 September	Sirius	Leander-class frigate	HMNB Portsmouth	Portsmouth	United Kingdom	
23 September	British Vine	Tanker	Harland & Wolff	Belfast	United Kingdom	For British Tanker Company.
24 September	Sand Gull	Dredger	J. Bolson & Son Ltd.	Poole	United Kingdom	For South Coast Shipping Co. Ltd.
24 September	Vénus	Daphné-class submarine	Direction des Constructions et Armes Navales	Cherbourg	France	For French Navy
2 October	Davidson	Garcia-class frigate	Avondale Shipyard	Avondale, Louisiana	United States	
6 October	Corchester	Coaster	Blyth Dry Docks & Shipbuilding Co. Ltd	Blyth	United Kingdom	For Cory Maritime Ltd.
10 October	Shenandoah	oiler	Sun Shipbuilding	Chester, Pennsylvania	United States	
16 October	KNM Kaura	Kobben-class submarine	Nordseewerke	Emden	West Germany	For Royal Norwegian Navy
30 October	Horne	Belknap-class cruiser	San Francisco Naval Shipyard	San Francisco, California	United States	
21 November	Fox	Belknap-class cruiser	Todd Pacific Shipyards	San Pedro, California	United States	
21 November	Lewis and Clark	Benjamin Franklin-class submarine	Newport News Shipbuilding	Newport News, Virginia	United States	
November	McDermott Oceanic No. 91	Barge	Alabama Drydock and Shipbuilding Company	Mobile, Alabama	United States	For J. Ray McDermott Co. Inc.
1 December	Finnhansa	ferry	Wärtsilä Hietalahti shipyard	Helsinki, Finland	Finland	for Finnlines
1 December	G.W.93	Barge	Appledore Shipbuilders Ltd.	Appledore	United Kingdom	For George Wimpey & Co. Ltd.
5 December	Benjamin Franklin	Benjamin Franklin-class submarine	Electric Boat	Groton, Connecticut	United States	
17 December	Pulborough	Coaster	Blyth Dry Docks & Shipbuilding Co. Ltd	Blyth	United Kingdom	For Stephenson Clarke Shipping Ltd.
19 December	Minerva	Leander-class frigate	Vickers-Armstrongs	Newcastle	United Kingdom	
19 December	Albert David	Garcia-class frigate	Lockheed Shipbuilding	Seattle, Washington	United States	
19 December	William H. Standley	Belknap-class cruiser	Bath Iron Works	Bath, Maine	United States	
19 December	Truxtun	Truxtun-class cruiser	New York Shipbuilding	Camden, New Jersey	United States	
19 December	KNM Ula	Kobben-class submarine	Nordseewerke	Emden	West Germany	For Royal Norwegian Navy
21 December	Corvina	Fishing trawler	Brooke Marine Ltd.	Lowestoft	United Kingdom	For Amalgamated Fisheries Co. Pty. Ltd.
December	McDermott Oceanic No. 92	Barge	Alabama Drydock and Shipbuilding Company	Mobile, Alabama	United States	For J. Ray McDermott Co. Inc.
Unknown date	Mars	Tug	Atlantic Shipbuilding Co. Ltd	Newport	United Kingdom	For Navigation Maritime Bulgare.
Unknown date	Otto Hahn	Nuclear-powered cargo ship	Howaldtswerke	Kiel	West Germany	
Unknown date	Persea	Motor yacht	Brooke Marine Ltd.	Lowestoft	United Kingdom	For private owner.
