= Spaulding (surname) =

Spaulding is a surname. Notable people with the surname include:

- Bill Spaulding (sportscaster) (born c. 1991), American sports announcer
- Charles Clinton Spaulding (1874–1952) prominent African-American business owner in Durham, North Carolina
- Daniel-Ryan Spaulding, Canadian comedian
- Douglas Spaulding (1920–2012), American Shakespeare scholar
- Elbridge G. Spaulding (1809–1897), American politician from New York
- Elna Spaulding (1909–2007), American politician from North Carolina
- Emilie Spaulding (1896–1988), American politician from Connecticut
- Hiland J. Spaulding (1841–1927), American politician from Wisconsin
- Huntley N. Spaulding (1869–1955), American manufacturer and politician from New Hampshire
- Jeb Spaulding (born 1952), American politician from Vermont
- Joseph Spaulding (1812–1877), American politician from Wisconsin
- Kenneth Spaulding (born 1944), American lawyer and politician from North Carolina
- Leila Clement Spaulding (1878–1973), American classicist and archaeologist
- Myron Spaulding (1905–2000), American yacht designer, sailboat racer and concert violinist
- Norman Spaulding (born 1971), American law professor
- Oliver Spaulding (disambiguation), multiple people
  - Oliver L. Spaulding (1833–1922), American politician from Michigan
  - Oliver Lyman Spaulding (general) (1875–1947), American Army general
- Philip F. Spaulding (1912–2005), American naval architect
- Robert Spaulding, English scholar
- Rolland H. Spaulding (1873–1942), American politician from New Hampshire
- Theodore I. Spaulding (1913–2002), American politician from South Dakota
- William Spaulding (disambiguation), multiple people
  - William H. Spaulding (1880–1966), American college football coach
  - William R. Spaulding (1924–2021), American politician from the District of Columbia

== Fictional characters ==
- Alan Spaulding, a character from the American television soap opera Guiding Light
- Alexandra Spaulding, a character from Guiding Light
- Alan-Michael Spaulding, a character from Guiding Light
- Phillip Spaulding, a character from Guiding Light
- Lizzie Spaulding, a character from Guiding Light
- Captain Spaulding (Rob Zombie character), a character appearing in films by Rob Zombie
- Captain Spaulding (Animal Crackers), a character portrayed by Groucho Marx
- Douglas Spaulding, a character from the Ray Bradbury novel Dandelion Wine
- Captain Calvin Spalding, a character played by Loudon Wainwright III in the television series M*A*S*H
- Spaulding Smails, grandson of Ted Knight's character in the 1980 film Caddyshack
- Spalding, a character from The Adventures of Tintin

== See also ==
- Spalding (surname)
