= Spalding Township =

Spalding Township may refer to:

- Spalding Township, Menominee County, Michigan
- Spalding Township, Aitkin County, Minnesota

See also

- Spalding (disambiguation)
