= Spalding =

Spalding may refer to:

== People ==
- Spalding (surname)
- Spalding Gray (1941–2004), American actor, screenwriter, and playwright
- Spalding (comics), a fictional character from The Adventures of Tintin by Hergé

== Places ==
Australia

- Spalding, South Australia, a town north of the Clare Valley
- Spalding, Western Australia, a suburb of Geraldton

Canada

- Rural Municipality of Spalding No. 368, Saskatchewan
  - Spalding, Saskatchewan, a village

England

- Spalding, Lincolnshire
  - Spalding (constituency), a former constituency
  - Spalding Rural District, a rural district in Holland, Lincolnshire, England from 1894 to 1974
- Spalding Moor, a wetland in the East Riding of Yorkshire
- Holme-on-Spalding Moor, village in East Riding of Yorkshire

United States

- Spalding, Georgia
- Spalding, Idaho
- Spalding, Missouri
- Spalding, Nebraska
- Spalding County, Georgia
- Spalding Township, Michigan
- Spalding Township, Minnesota

== Other ==
- Clan Spalding, Scottish Sept of Clan Murray
- King & Spalding, American law firm in Atlanta, Georgia, US
- Spalding (company), American sporting goods company
- Spalding Club, nineteenth-century antiquarian society, publishing at Aberdeen
- Spalding Gentlemen's Society, English club founded in 1710 at Spalding, Lincolnshire
- Spalding Grammar School, a selective school on Priory Road in Spalding, Lincolnshire, England
- Spalding High School (disambiguation), the name of several high schools
- Spalding House, a historic building belonging to the Honolulu Museum of Art
- Spalding Method, a program for teaching students to read by first teaching them to write
- Spalding Priory, a small Benedictine house founded as a cell of Croyland Abbey in 1052
- Spalding railway station serves the town of Spalding, Lincolnshire, England
- Spalding Rockwell is a punk/electro/pop band
- Spalding United F.C., a football club based in Spalding, Lincolnshire, England
- Spalding University, a private university in Louisville, Kentucky
- Spalding v Gamage, a leading decision of the House of Lords on the tort of passing off
- Spalding & Hodge, paper makers and wholesale stationers based in London, founded 1789
- Spalding World Tour

== See also ==
- Spaulding (disambiguation)
- Justice Spalding (disambiguation)
