= Faunus, Michigan =

- Unincorporated community
- Location within the state of Michigan
- Coordinates: 45°53′33″N 87°30′32″W
- Country: United States
- State: Michigan
- County: Menominee
- Township: Spalding
- Elevation: 958 ft (292 m)
- Time zone: UTC-6 (Central (CST))
  - Summer (DST): UTC-5 (CDT)
- ZIP code(s): 49873
- Area code: 906
- GNIS feature ID: 1617553

Faunus is an unincorporated community in Menominee County, in the U.S. state of Michigan.

== History ==
A post office was established at Faunus in 1896, and discontinued in 1908. The community was named after Faunus, a god in Roman mythology.
