= MV Coho =

Ferry between Port Angeles and Victoria

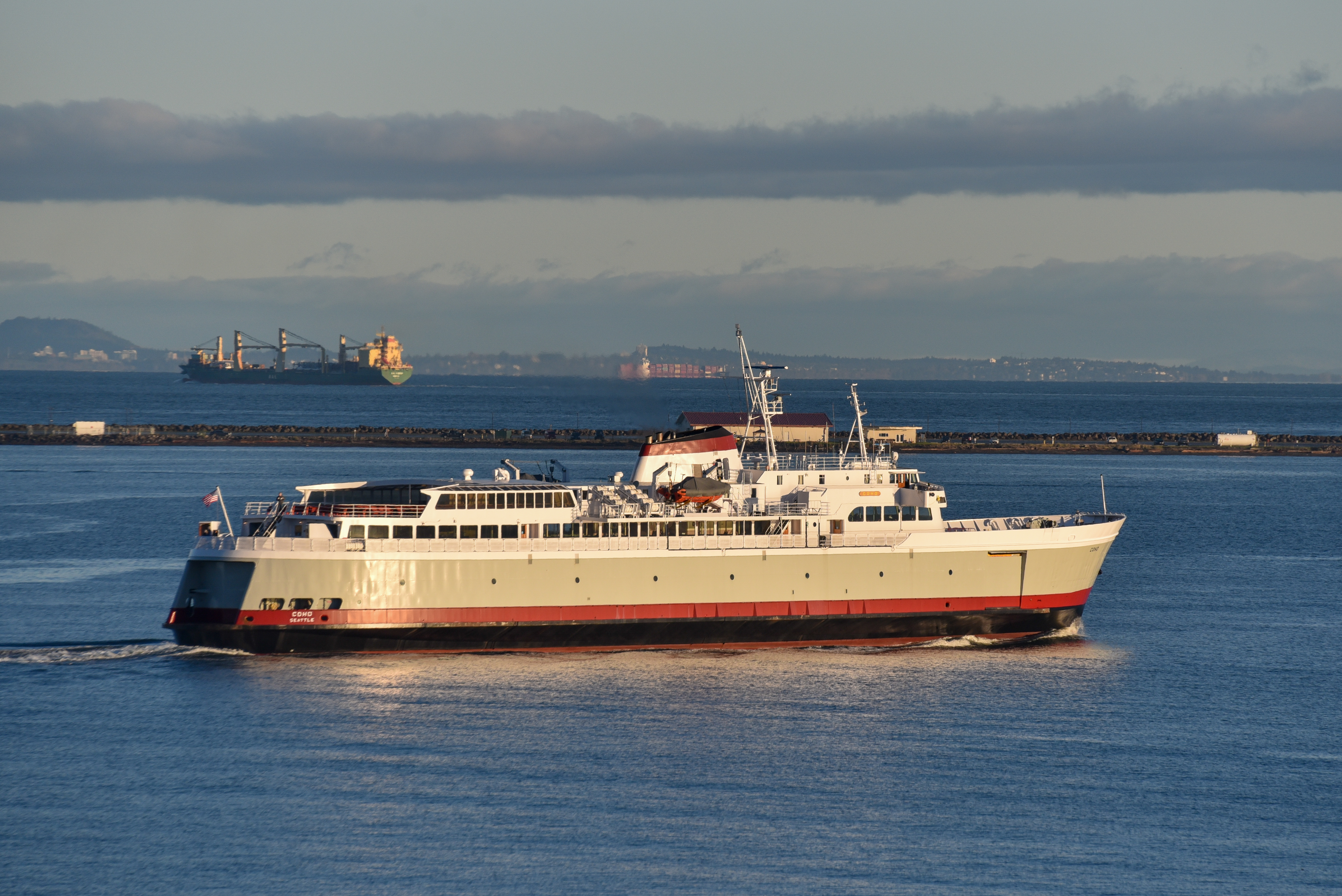
- MV Coho leaving Port Angeles, Washington

History
- Name: Coho
- Owner: Black Ball Transport
- Operator: Black Ball Ferry Line
- Port of registry: Seattle, Washington, United States
- Builder: Puget Sound Bridge and Dredging Company
- Launched: May 25, 1959
- In service: December 29, 1959
- Identification: IMO number: 5076949; MMSI number: 366929710; Call sign: WM4599
- Status: In service

General characteristics
- Class & type: Auto ferry
- Tonnage: 5,366 GRT
- Length: 341.5 ft (104.1 m)
- Beam: 72 ft (21.95 m)
- Draught: 12.6 ft (3.84 m)
- Propulsion: 2×EMD12-645F7B Diesels, 2,550 hp (1,900 kW) each
- Speed: 15 knots (28 km/h; 17 mph)
- Capacity: 110 vehicles + 1,000 passengers

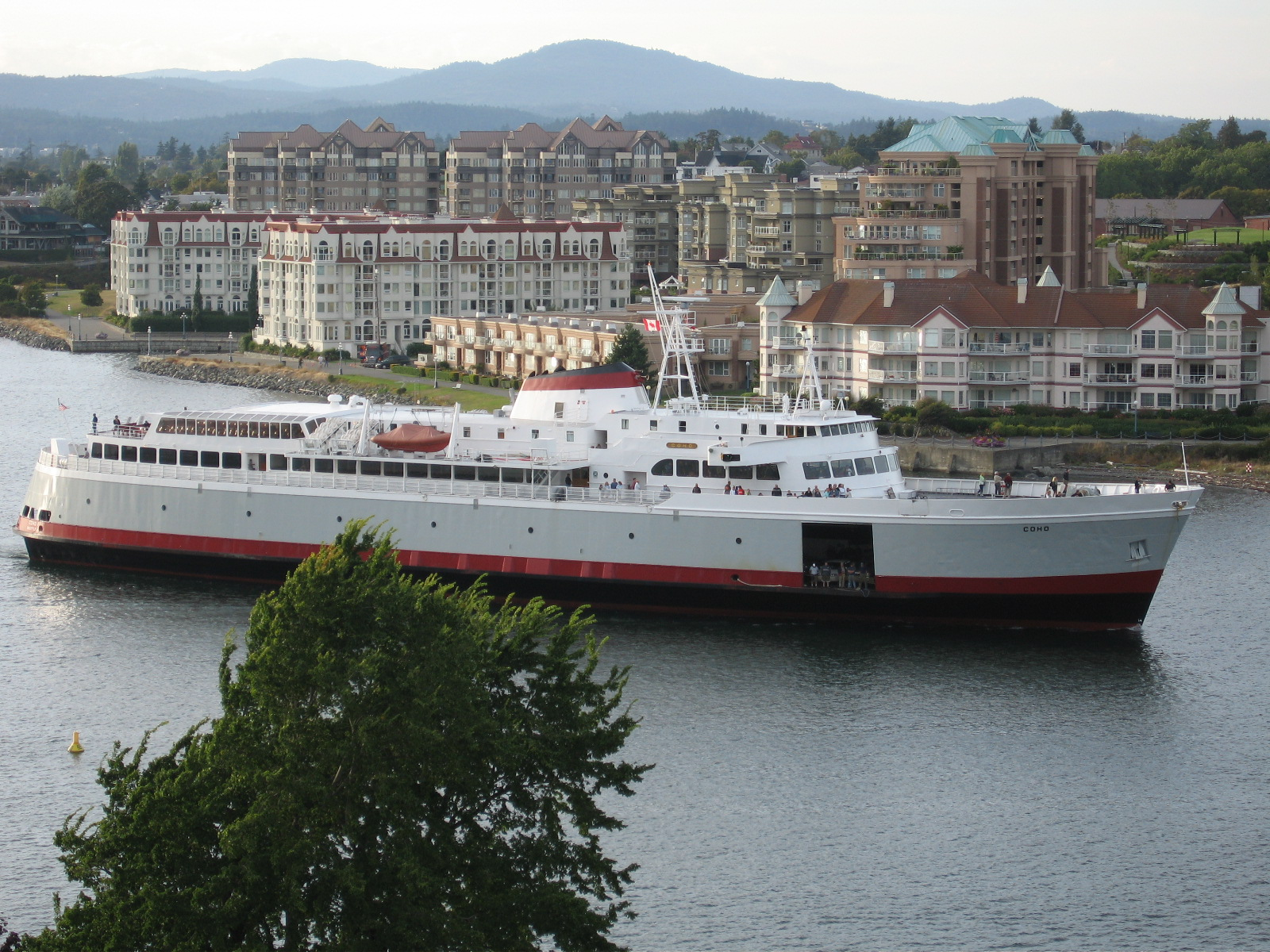
MV Coho in Victoria Harbour, British Columbia, Canada

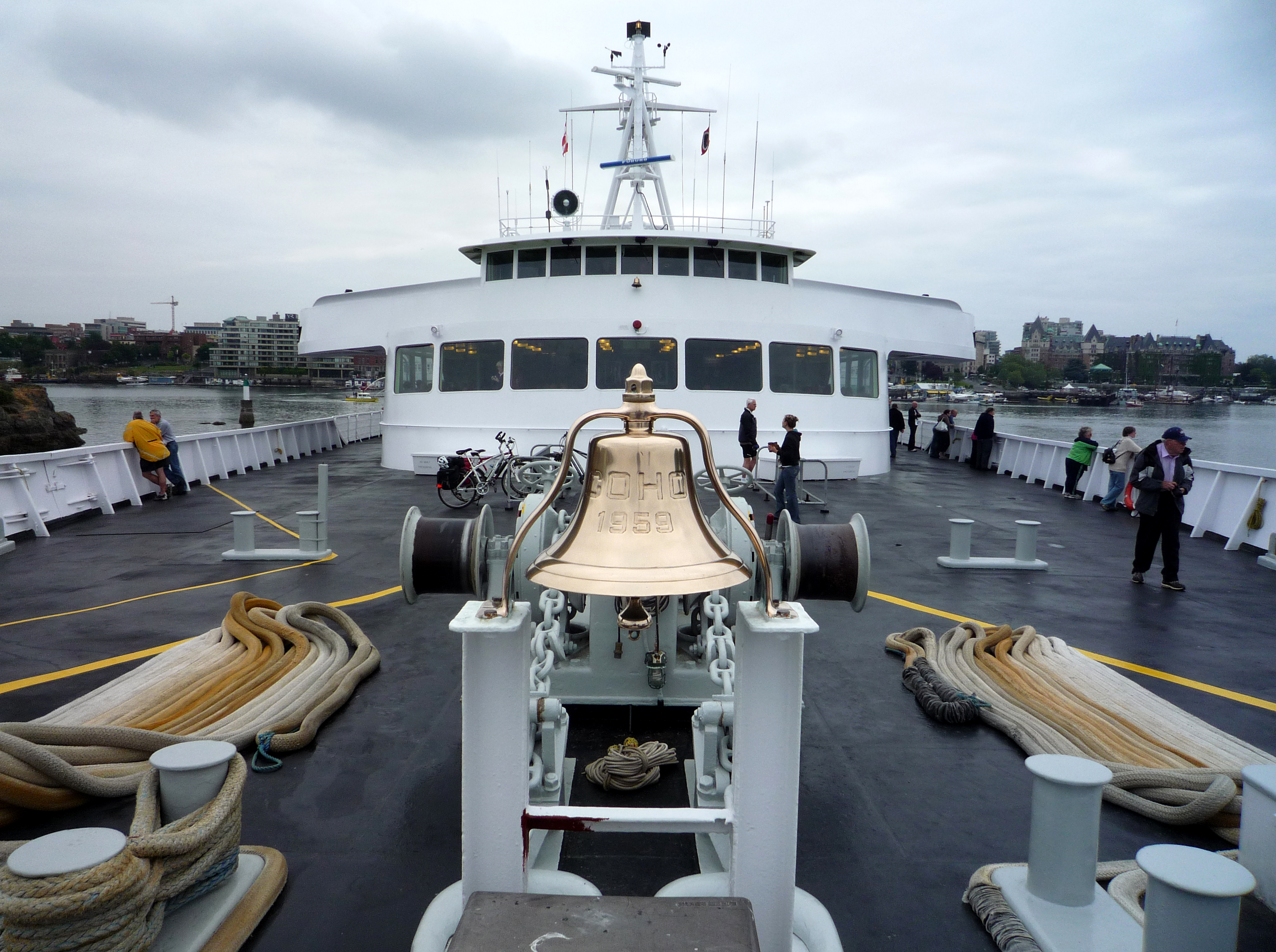
Looking back on the bridge, from the bow

MV Coho is a roll-on/roll-off ferry owned and operated by Black Ball Line between the United States and Canada. Coho, which is Black Ball's only ferry, carries passengers and vehicles across the Strait of Juan de Fuca between Victoria, British Columbia, and Port Angeles, Washington.

Coho makes between two and four daily round trips from Port Angeles to Victoria, with each crossing taking about 90 minutes and covering 37 kilometers or 20 nautical miles. The peak summer season has the most trips per day and the winter season the fewest. The ferry has an onboard cafeteria, gift shop, and lounges.

== Construction and design ==
Coho was designed by Philip F. Spaulding & Associates of Seattle and is named after the coho salmon commonly found in the United States' Pacific Northwest. Coho was the first large vessel built on the West Coast in 20 years solely with private financing. The vessel was built by Puget Sound Bridge and Dredging Company in Seattle, Washington and made her first sailing to Victoria, British Columbia on December 29, 1959. She was originally powered by two Cooper-Bessemer diesel engines rated at 2,080 brake horsepower (1,550 kW) each. In 2004 she was refitted with two V-12 Electro-Motive Division (EMD)12-645F7B diesels rated at 2,550 hp (1,900 kW) each. Coho has twin 8-foot (2.44 m) stainless propellers with twin rudders. Her overall length is 341.5 feet (104.1 m) with a service speed of 15 knots (28 km/h; 17 mph). The ship's vehicle clearance is 14 feet (4.27 m) with a carrying capacity of 110 vehicles and up to 1,000 passengers.

The design of Coho was the basis for that of BC Ferries' first two ships, the Sidney-class Queen of Sidney and Queen of Tsawwassen, which developed into the V-class ferry.

== Terrorist incident ==
Coho made news on December 14, 1999, when Ahmed Ressam was arrested by border authorities in Port Angeles, Washington after he attempted to enter the United States via Victoria on Coho with home-made explosives and timing devices hidden in his car. He admitted he and accomplices had planned to bomb Los Angeles International Airport on New Year's Eve, 1999.
