= Senator Spaulding =

Senator Spaulding may refer to:

- Jeb Spaulding (born 1952), Vermont State Senate
- Theodore I. Spaulding (1913–2002), South Dakota State Senate
