= Spaulding =

Spaulding can refer to:

== People ==
- Spaulding (surname)

== Places ==
United States

- Camp Spaulding, California
- Spaulding, California
- Spaulding, Illinois
- Spaulding Mountain, Maine
- Spaulding Township, Michigan
- Spaulding, Oklahoma
- Spaulding, Wisconsin

== Other uses ==
- Spaulding (automobile)
- Spaulding Rehabilitation Hospital, Boston, Massachusetts, USA
- Spaulding Turnpike in New Hampshire, USA
- Spaulding Wooden Boat Center, a non-profit living history museum in Sausalito, California

== See also ==
- Spalding (disambiguation)
