= William Spalding =

William Spalding may refer to:

- William de Spalding (before 1300 – after 1321), accidentally killed a man whilst playing medieval football in 1321
- William Spalding (MP) (before 1355 – after 1400), represented Southwark (UK Parliament constituency)
- William Spalding (writer) (1809–1859), Scottish author and educator

== See also ==
- William Spaulding (disambiguation)
- Spalding (disambiguation)
