= Spalding, Michigan =

- Unincorporated community
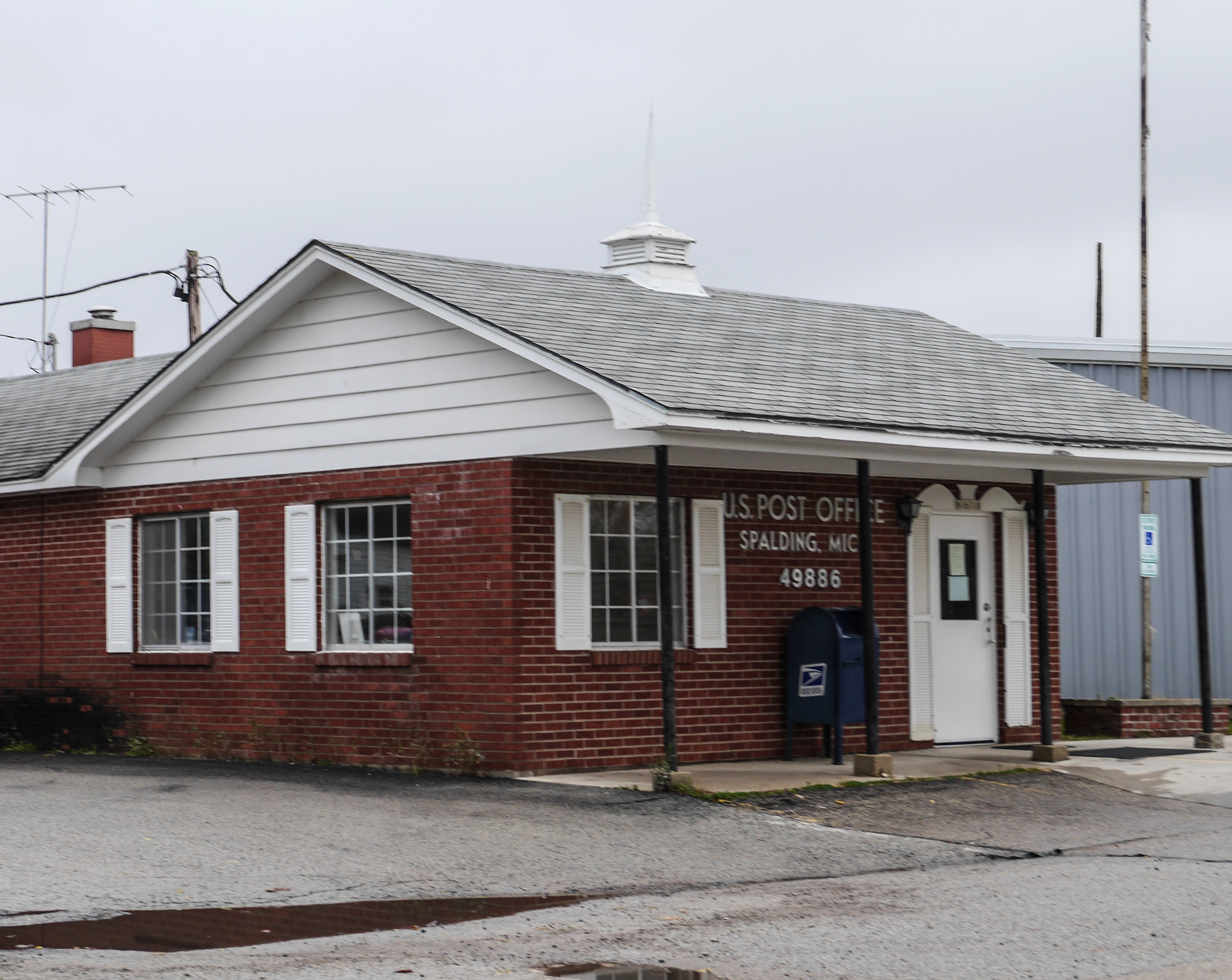
- U.S. Post Office in Spalding

- Location within the state of Michigan
- Coordinates: 45°41′45″N 87°30′39″W
- Country: United States
- State: Michigan
- County: Menominee
- Township: Spalding
- Elevation: 850 ft (260 m)
- Time zone: UTC-6 (Central (CST))
  - Summer (DST): UTC-5 (CDT)
- ZIP code(s): 49886
- Area code: 906
- GNIS feature ID: 638462

Spalding is an unincorporated community in Menominee County, Michigan, United States. Spalding is located in Spalding Township along U.S. Highway 2 (US 2) and US 41, one mile (1.6 km) northeast of Powers. Spalding has a post office with ZIP code 49886.

== History ==
A post office called Spalding has been in operation since 1874. The community was named for Jesse Spalding, of Chicago.

== Climate ==
This climatic region is typified by large seasonal temperature differences, with warm to hot (and often humid) summers and cold (sometimes severely cold) winters. According to the Köppen Climate Classification system, Spalding has a humid continental climate, abbreviated "Dfb" on climate maps.

== Photos ==
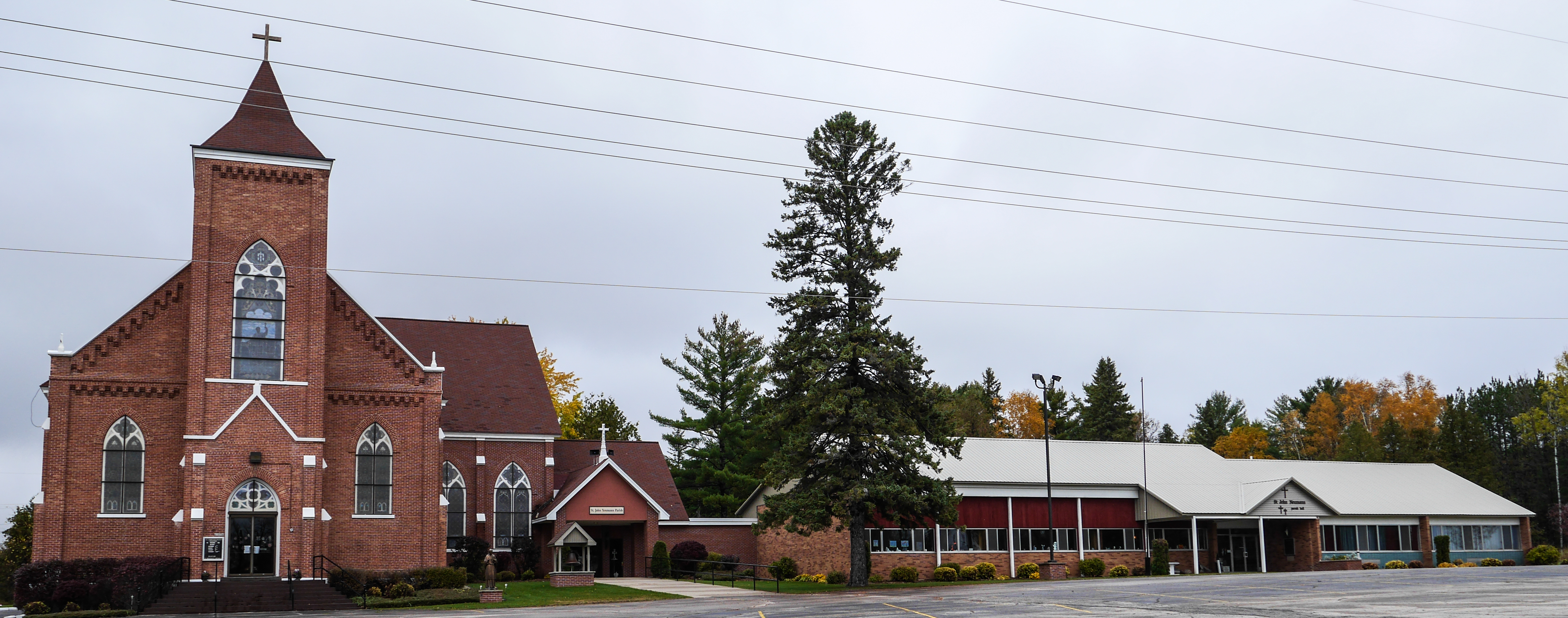
Spalding, MI Catholic Church

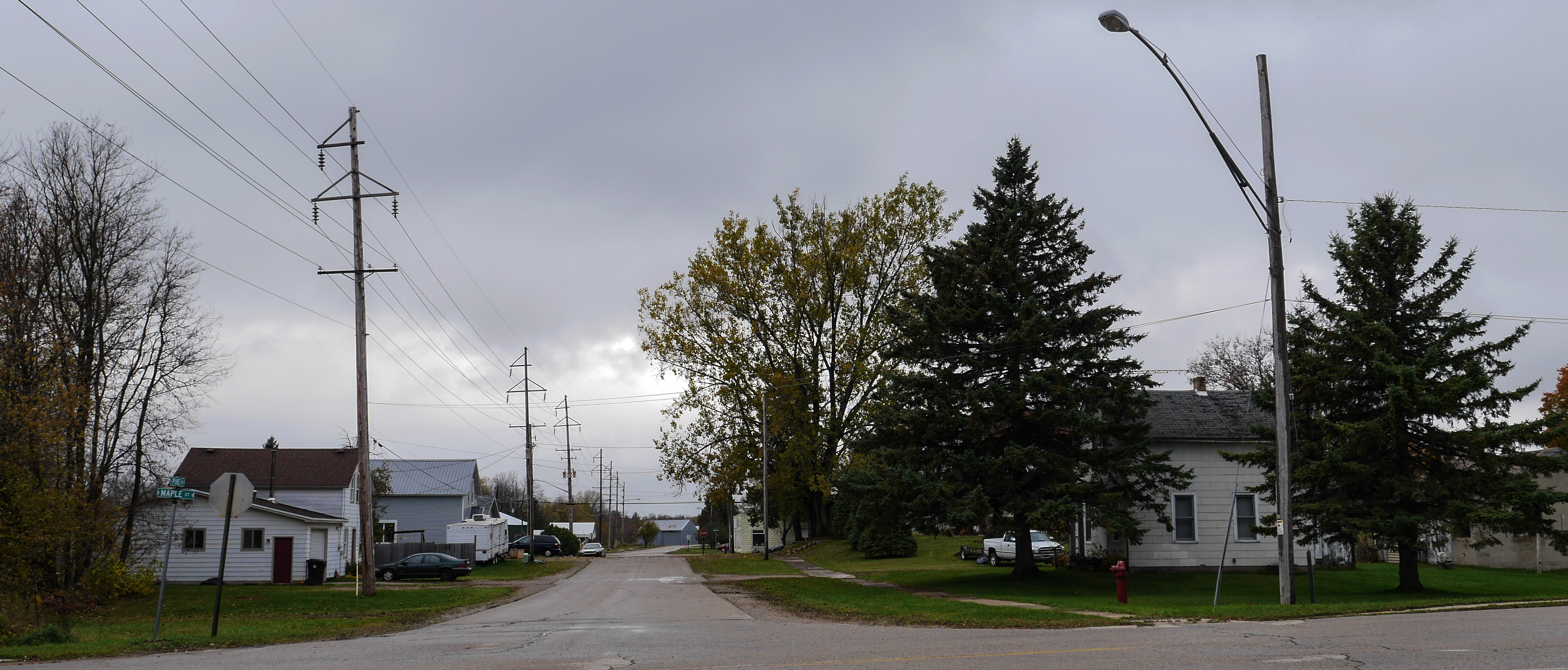
Pine Ave Spalding MI

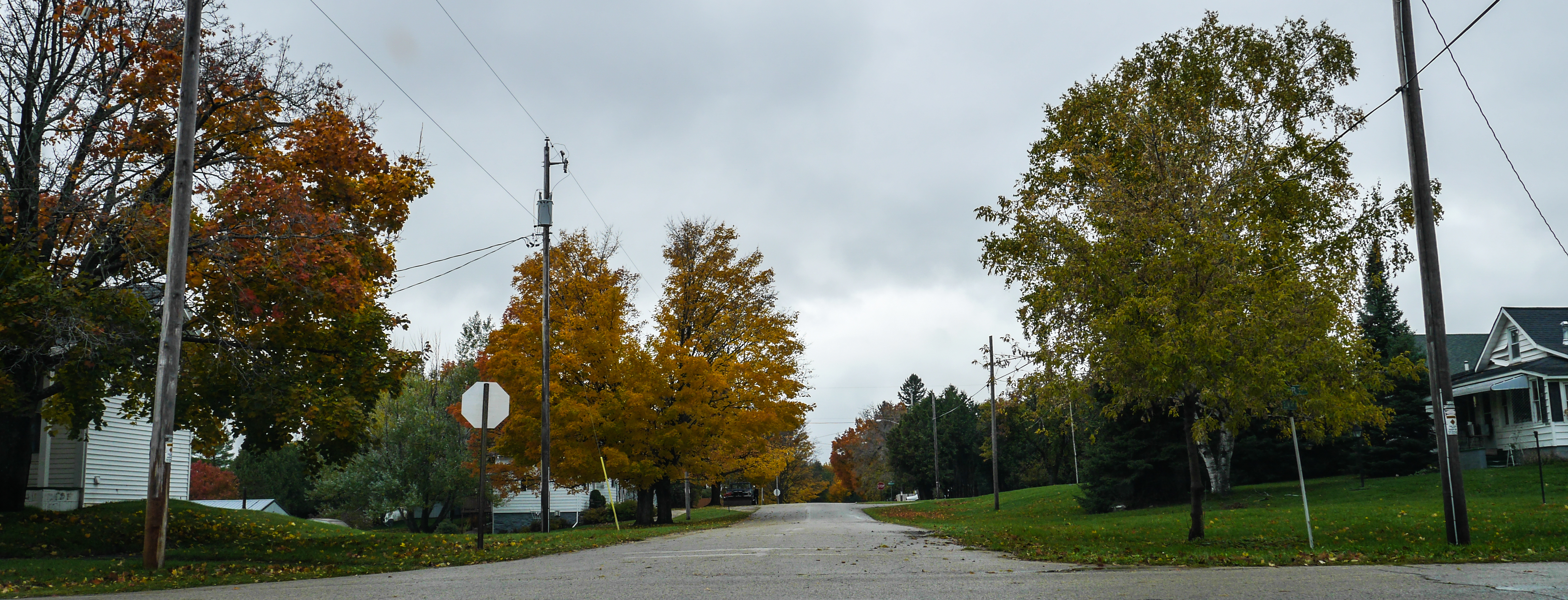
Elm St Spalding MI

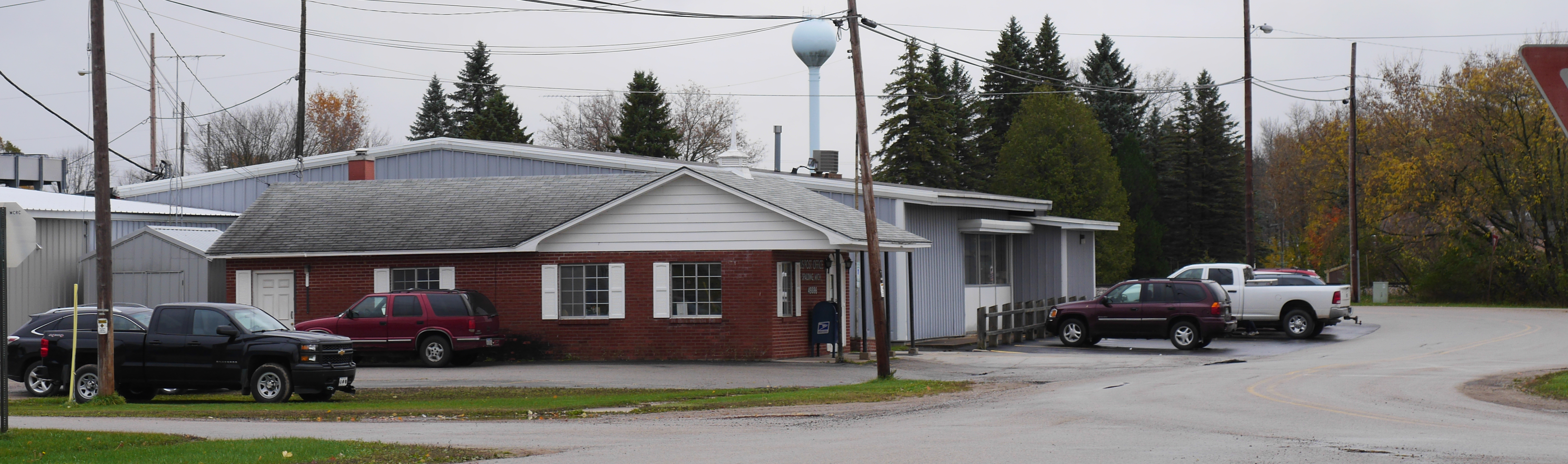
Post Office Fazers Food Land Spalding MI
