= William Spaulding =

William Spaulding may refer to:

- William H. Spaulding (1880–1966), American sports coach
- William J. Spaulding Sr. (1923–1997), American musician
- William R. Spaulding (1924–2021), American legislator
- Bill Spaulding (sportscaster) (born c. 1991), American sports announcer

== See also ==
- William Spalding (disambiguation)
- Spaulding (disambiguation)
