= Queen of New Westminster =

Ferry boat in Canada

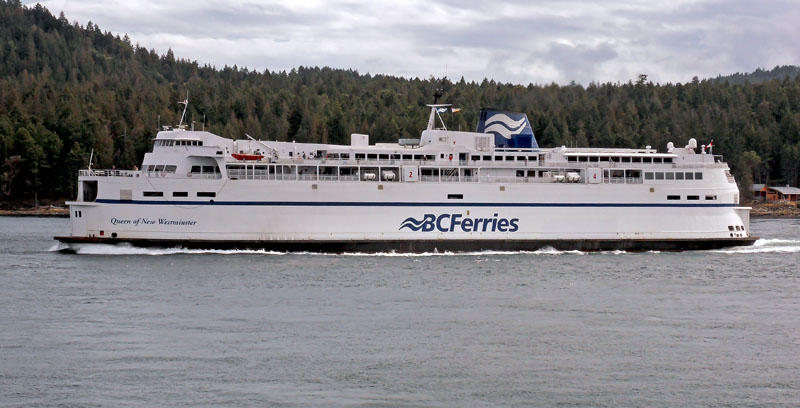

History
- Name: Queen of New Westminster
- Namesake: City of New Westminster
- Operator: BC Ferries
- Port of registry: (Canada) Victoria
- Route: Tsawwassen ↔ Swartz Bay Tsawwassen ↔️ Duke Point
- Builder: Victoria Machinery Depot
- Yard number: 105
- Laid down: May 31, 1963
- Launched: July 31, 1964
- In service: 1964
- Identification: IMO number: 6413663; MMSI number: 316001255; Callsign: VDQQ
- Status: In service

General characteristics
- Class & type: V-class ferry
- Tonnage: 8,785 GT; 6,954 NT; 1,765 DWT
- Displacement: 6,129 t (6,032 long tons)
- Length: 129.9 m (426 ft 2 in) oa; 119.6 m (392 ft 5 in) pp
- Beam: 23.9 m (78 ft 5 in)
- Draught: 3.6 m (11 ft 10 in)
- Depth: 6.2 m (20 ft 4 in)
- Decks: 5
- Installed power: Wärtsilä 9R‑32D 18,100 hp (13,500 kW)
- Speed: 20 knots (37 km/h; 23 mph)
- Capacity: 1,332 passengers and crew; 254 cars

Queen of New Westminster is a Canadian roll-on/roll-off V-class passenger ferry operated by BC Ferries. The ship was built at Victoria Machinery Depot in Victoria, British Columbia, with the vessel's keel being laid down on May 31, 1963, and launched on July 31, 1964. The ferry entered service in 1964. In 1973, Queen of New Westminster underwent the first major refit at Burrard Dry Dock of the ferry's career. The vessel underwent further refits in 1991 and in 2007 to 2009, the latter extending the ship's service life for a further fifteen years. Queen of New Westminster is the oldest ship in service with BC Ferries.

== Design and description ==
The V-class roll-on/roll-off ferries were continuations of the preceding Sidney-class design created by naval architect Philip F. Spaulding and his Canadian partner Arthur McLaren for BC Ferries. Queen of New Westminster is part of the third batch, and final ship, of the class. As built, the vessel was identical to the other members of class. The vessel underwent a refit in 1972 in which the ship was lengthened by adding an 26 m (84 ft) section amidships, giving the vessel a length overall of 120 metres (394 ft), a breadth of 23.95 m (78 ft 7 in) and a draught of 4.0 m (13 ft). The ship measured 4,904 gross register tons (GRT) and 3,341 net register tons (NRT). The ferry was powered by twin Mirrless diesel engines creating 4,900 kilowatts (6,600 hp). The ship had a maximum speed of 18 knots (33 km/h; 21 mph) and a crew of 55. The vessel had capacity for 1,250 passengers and 192 cars. The vessel has a single deck for vehicle stowage which is accessed by bow and stern doors. A second refit in 1991 saw the ship re-engined with four Wärtsilä 9R-32D diesel engines driving two controllable-pitch propellers creating 13,500 kW (18,100 hp). Queen of New Westminster had the car deck platform ramps removed and was raised to add a second car deck, which improved her vehicle capacity.

After the final refit in 2009, the vessel measures 129.9 m (426 ft 2 in) long overall and 119.6 m (392 ft 5 in) between perpendiculars with a beam of 23.9 m (78 ft 5 in) and a draught of 3.6 m (11 ft 10 in). Queen of New Westminster has a full load displacement of 6,129 t (6,032 long tons), a 8,785 gross tonnage (GT), 6,954 net tonnage (NT) and 1,765 tons deadweight (DWT). The ferry has a depth of 6.2 m (20 ft 4 in), three decks, and capacity for 1,332 passengers and crew with space for 254 cars.

== Construction and career ==
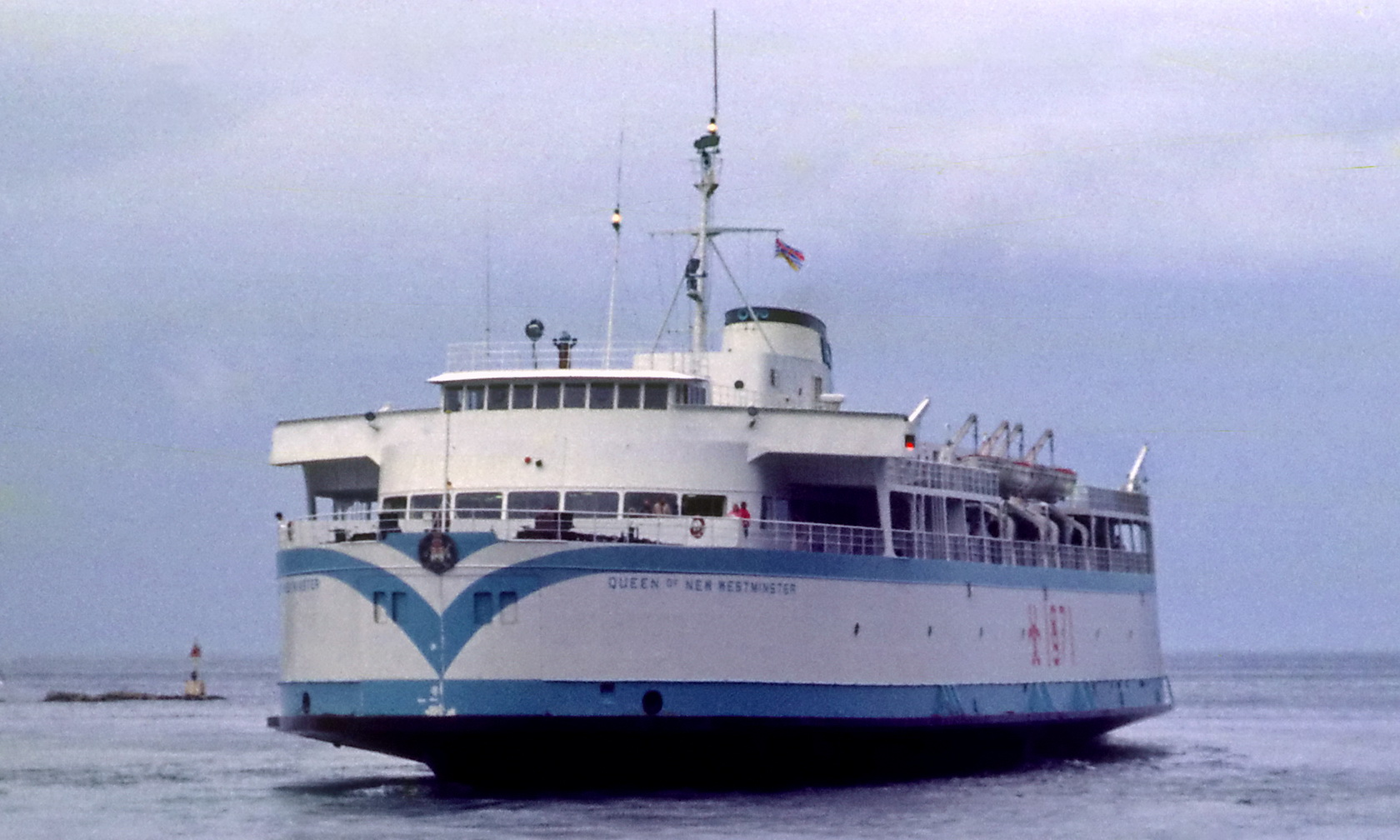
Queen of New Westminster on April 9, 1971

The ship's keel was laid down on May 31, 1963, at Victoria Machinery Depot in Victoria, British Columbia with the yard number 105. Queen of New Westminster was launched on July 31, 1964, and entered service that year, registered in Victoria. In October 1971, Queen of New Westminster pulled out of her berth at the Departure Bay terminal while vehicle loading was in progress. A car and its two occupants fell into the water. Both of the vehicle's occupants were rescued.

Queen of New Westminster was lengthened in 1972 at Burrard Dry Dock in North Vancouver. Upon return to service following the refit, the ferry operated on the route between Horseshoe Bay and Departure Bay. In 1991, the ship underwent another refit at Vancouver Shipyards. However, shortly after returning to service in August, the ferry returned to dry dock after significant vibrations from the ship were felt by both passengers and crew. On August 13, 1992, the ship pulled out of her berth at the Departure Bay terminal while vehicle loading ramps were still lowered and resting on the ship. Three people were killed, one was seriously injured, and two others received minor injuries when a van from Alberta containing six people fell 15 m (49 ft) from the upper deck onto the lower car deck and finally into the sea below. The van was stopped and instructed to wait on the loading ramp by terminal crew members. The Transportation Safety Board of Canada determined that this incident was caused primarily by the vessel not properly following departing procedures and secondarily due to poor communication between terminal and ship crew members.

Though four of Queen of New Westminster's sister ships were scrapped by 2012, she had a major refit of her passenger areas between late 2007 and early 2009 to prepare her for another ten to fifteen years of service. The ferry operates on the route between Tsawwassen and Swartz Bay. In September 2024, the vessel was pulled from service after losing a propeller and spilling 800 L (210 US gal) of hydraulic oil when the propeller's shaft failed. Both shafts were replaced and the rudder was also fixed after more issues were discovered. The ferry returned to service in March 2025.

== Sources ==
- Bannerman, Gary & Bannerman, Patricia (1985). The Ships of British Columbia – An Illustrated History of the British Columbia Ferry Corporation. Surrey, British Columbia: Hancock House Publishers. ISBN 0-88839-188-9.
- "Queen of New Westminster". BC Ferries.
- Favelle, Peter (1974). The Queens of British Columbia: A detailed account of the ships in the B.C. Ferry Fleet. North Vancouver, British Columbia: Discovery Magazine. OCLC 1151096862.
- "Queen of New Westminster: Asset Details". Lloyd's Register.
- McLaren, T. A. & Jensen, Vickie (2000). Ships of Steel: A British Columbia's Shipbuilder's Story. Madeira Park, British Columbia: Harbour Publishing. ISBN 1-55017-242-5.
- "Marine Investigation Report M92W1057". Transportation Safety Board of Canada. Archived from the original on October 3, 2021.
