= Philip F. Spaulding =

American naval architect

- Born: November 27, 1912; Snoqualmie Valley, Washington
- Died: May 5, 2005 (aged 92); Seattle, Washington
- Known for: Naval architecture
- Website: http://www.ebdg.com/

Philip F. Spaulding (1912–2005) was a naval architect who lived and worked in Seattle, Washington. He played an immense role in shaping North America's ferries for more than half a century, and he also designed many yachts along the way.

== Detail ==
Philip Spaulding was born on November 27, 1912, and died on May 5, 2005, at the age of 92. In 1952 he founded the marine design firm Philip F. Spaulding and Associates, which he led until his retirement in 1980. Spaulding was commissioned to design many ferries and other ships used on North America's West coast. Ships designed by Spaulding are still used to this day by the Alaska Marine Highway, Washington State Ferries, BC Ferries, and Golden Gate Ferries, in San Francisco. In 1987, many years after a merger and name change to Nickum and Spaulding Associates, the company was renamed Elliott Bay Design Group and its assets were sold to its employees.

== BC Ferries ==
Spaulding and Associates designed many of the first vessels of the BC Ferries fleet, including the Sidney class, the V class, the nearly identical B class, and the C class. Some of these designs were actually just modifications of previously designed ships; for example, the Sidney class is nearly identical to the MV Coho, run by the Puget Sound Navigation Company, and the C class was inspired by Washington State Ferries' Jumbo class.
