= Spalding (surname) =

Spalding is a surname. Notable people with the surname include:

- A. G. Spalding (1850–1915), American baseball player and sporting goods manufacturer
- Albert Spalding (violinist) (1888–1953), American composer and concert violinist
- Al Spalding (naval architect) (1932–2022), American naval architect
- Baird T. Spalding (1872–1953), English-American author
- Brian Spalding (1923–2016), English professor, physics
- Burleigh F. Spalding (1853–1934), Chief Justice of North Dakota
- Cadence Spalding, American educator and musician
- Cameron Spalding (born 2005), Canadian snowboarder
- Catherine Spalding (1793–1858), American Roman Catholic nun
- Charles F. Spalding (Chuck Spalding, 1919–2000), American heir, political advisor, television screenwriter and investment banker
- Dick Spalding (1893–1950), American soccer player
- Douglas Spalding (1840–1877), English biologist
- Esperanza Spalding (born 1984) American jazz bassist and singer
- Esta Spalding (born 1966), Canadian author and poet
- Eva Ruth Spalding (1883–1969), English composer
- Georg Ludwig Spalding (1762–1811), German philologist
- George Spalding (1836–1915), U.S. Representative from Michigan
- Harriet Mabel Spalding (1862–1935), American poet, litterateur
- Henry H. Spalding (1803–1843), U.S. Presbyterian missionary, established the Lapwai Mission in 1836 in what is now Idaho
- J. Mark Spalding (born 1965), American Roman Catholic bishop
- Johann Joachim Spalding (1714–1804), German Protestant theologian
- John Spalding (disambiguation), the name of several people
- Kim Spalding (1915–2000), American film, television and theatre actor
- Linda Spalding (born 1943), Canadian writer and editor
- Martin John Spalding (1810–1872), bishop of Baltimore
- Phebe Estelle Spalding (1859–1937), English professor and author
- Phil Spalding (1957–2023), American bass player
- Ray Spalding (born 1997), American basketball player
- Robert Spalding (born 1966), U.S. Brigadier General in the U.S. Air Force, Defense Attaché to China, Beijing, Director for Strategic Planning, National Security Council, White House, author, senior fellow at Hudson Institute
- Silsby Spalding (1886–1949), American businessman and politician; the first Mayor of Beverly Hills, California
- Solomon Spalding (1761–1816), American clergyman, businessman, and author
- Susan Marr Spalding (1841–1908), American poet
- Thomas Spalding (1774–1851), United States Representative from Georgia
- Volney Morgan Spalding (1849–1918), American botanist
- William Spalding (disambiguation), the name of several people

== Fictional characters ==
- Lionel Spalding, a character from Dunston Checks In, portrayed by Glenn Shadix
- Dr. Ryan Spalding, a character from Grey's Anatomy, portrayed by Brandon Scott

== See also ==
- Spaulding (surname)
- Spalding, Lincolnshire
