= Powers, Michigan =

- Village
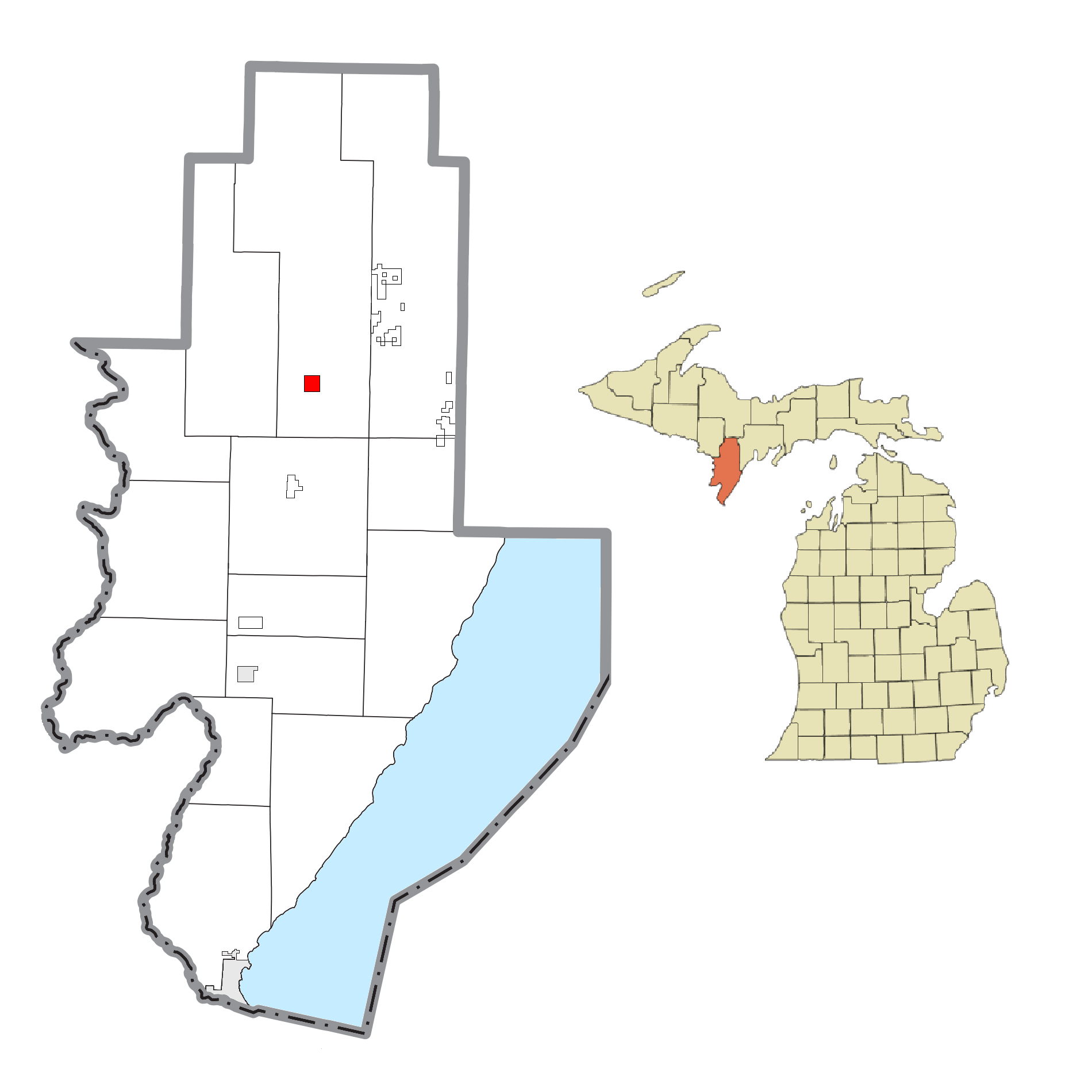
- Location within Menominee County and the state of Michigan

- Location within Michigan Location within the United States
- Coordinates: 45°41′24″N 87°31′31″W
- Country: United States
- State: Michigan
- County: Menominee
- Township: Spalding
- Founded: 1872
- Incorporated: 1915

Government
  - President: Carol Welch
  - Clerk: Ruth Blahnik

Area
  - Total: 0.94 sq mi (2.43 km^{2})
  - Land: 0.94 sq mi (2.43 km^{2})
  - Water: 0 sq mi (0.00 km^{2})
- Elevation: 876 ft (267 m)

Population (2020)
  - Total: 381
  - Density: 405.7/sq mi (156.65/km^{2})
- Time zone: UTC-6 (Central (CST))
  - Summer (DST): UTC-5 (CDT)
- ZIP Code: 49874
- Area code: 906
- FIPS code: 26-66140
- GNIS feature ID: 0635379
- Website: www.powers-spalding.org

Powers is a village in Menominee County in the U.S. state of Michigan. The population was 381 at the 2020 census, down from 422 in 2010. Located within Spalding Township, it is part of the Marinette micropolitan area.

== History ==
At an early date, the place was called "Menominee River Junction", because here was the junction between the main railroad line and the Menominee River Branch. The origin of the name "Powers" is uncertain. Several sources claim the village was named after Edward Powers, a civil engineer involved in building the railroad there. Another source claims the village was founded in 1872 and named after Tom Powers, an engineer for the Chicago & North Western Railroad.

== Geography ==
Powers is in north-central Menominee County at the junction of U.S. Routes 2 and 41, which meet in the northeast corner of the village. US 2 leads west 30 miles (48 km) to Iron Mountain, while US 41 leads south 41 miles (66 km) to Menominee, the county seat. The two concurrent highways lead east 23 miles (37 km) to Escanaba on Lake Michigan. Powers is bordered to the northeast by the unincorporated community of Spalding.

According to the U.S. Census Bureau, the village has a total area of 0.94 square miles (2.43 km^{2}), all of it recorded as land. The Cedar River flows briefly through the northern portion of the village.

== Demographics ==
Historical population
Census	Pop.	Note	%±
1920	249		—
1930	360		44.6%
1940	258		−28.3%
1950	510		97.7%
1960	415		−18.6%
1970	560		34.9%
1980	490		−12.5%
1990	271		−44.7%
2000	430		58.7%
2010	422		−1.9%
2020	381		−9.7%
U.S. Decennial Census

=== 2010 census ===
As of the census of 2010, there were 422 people, 135 households, and 63 families living in the village. The population density was 426.3 inhabitants per square mile (164.6/km^{2}). There were 141 housing units at an average density of 142.4 per square mile (55.0/km^{2}). The racial makeup of the village was 98.3% White, 0.9% Native American, 0.2% Asian, and 0.5% from other races. Hispanic or Latino of any race were 0.9% of the population.

There were 135 households, of which 22.2% had children under the age of 18 living with them, 35.6% were married couples living together, 8.9% had a female householder with no husband present, 2.2% had a male householder with no wife present, and 53.3% were non-families. 48.9% of all households were made up of individuals, and 26.7% had someone living alone who was 65 years of age or older. The average household size was 1.94 and the average family size was 2.90.

The median age in the village was 65.1 years. 11.4% of residents were under the age of 18; 5.3% were between the ages of 18 and 24; 16.1% were from 25 to 44; 17.1% were from 45 to 64; and 50.2% were 65 years of age or older. The gender makeup of the village was 41.5% male and 58.5% female.

=== 2000 census ===
As of the census of 2000, there were 430 people, 124 households, and 59 families living in the village. The population density was 433.8 inhabitants per square mile (167.5/km^{2}). There were 146 housing units at an average density of 147.3 per square mile (56.9/km^{2}). The racial makeup of the village was 97.67% White, 0.47% Native American, and 1.86% from two or more races.

There were 124 households, out of which 14.5% had children under the age of 18 living with them, 40.3% were married couples living together, 5.6% had a female householder with no husband present, and 52.4% were non-families. 45.2% of all households were made up of individuals, and 28.2% had someone living alone who was 65 years of age or older. The average household size was 2.08 and the average family size was 2.85.

In the village, the population was spread out, with 9.5% under the age of 18, 5.6% from 18 to 24, 13.7% from 25 to 44, 16.7% from 45 to 64, and 54.4% who were 65 years of age or older. The median age was 68 years. For every 100 females, there were 62.3 males. For every 100 females age 18 and over, there were 60.1 males.

The median income for a household in the village was $20,250, and the median income for a family was $36,250. Males had a median income of $25,000 versus $20,625 for females. The per capita income for the village was $14,207. About 14.6% of families and 17.9% of the population were below the poverty line, including 19.0% of those under age 18 and 24.2% of those age 65 or over.
