= Justice Spalding =

Justice Spalding may refer to:

- Burleigh F. Spalding (1853–1934), associate justice and chief justice of the North Dakota Supreme Court
- John Spalding (Massachusetts judge) (1897–1979), associate justice of the Massachusetts Supreme Judicial Court
- Rufus P. Spalding (1798–1886), associate justice of the Ohio Supreme Court
