= V-class ferry =

Ferry class in British Columbia, Canada

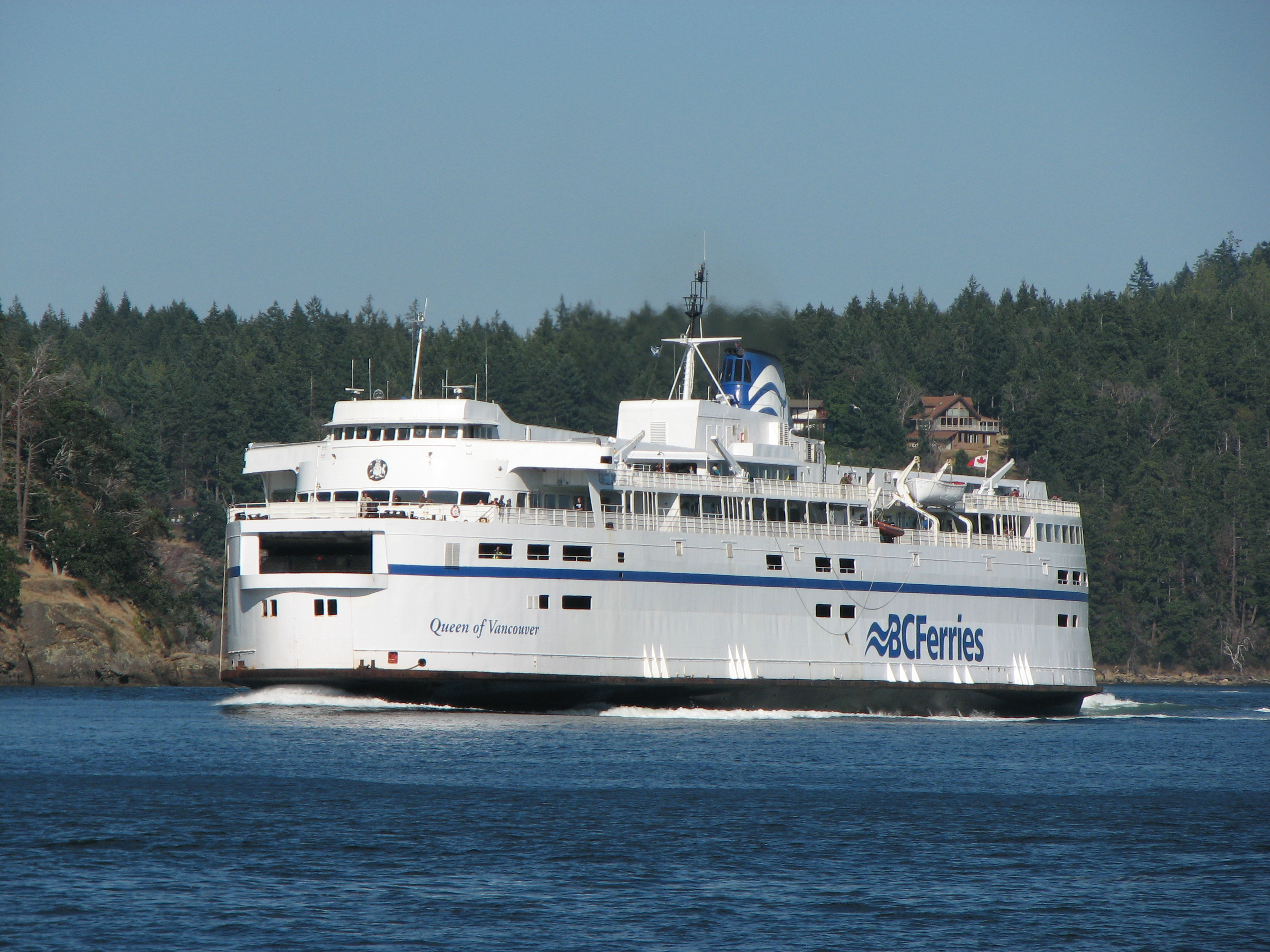
- Queen of Vancouver in Active Pass in 2007

Class overview
- Name: V class (Victoria class)
- Operators: BC Ferries
- Preceded by: Sidney class
- Succeeded by: C class; Spirit class; Coastal class
- Subclasses: Burnaby class; Queen of New Westminster
- Built: 1962–1965
- In service: 1962–present
- Planned: 7
- Completed: 7
- Active: 1
- Scrapped: 5

The V-class ferries, also known as the Victoria class, originally included seven ferries operated by BC Ferries built between 1962 and 1965. The V class were a continuation of the previous Sidney-class design with some cosmetic changes and different engines. These vessels were the backbone of service on the Tsawwassen – Swartz Bay route prior to the arrival of Spirit of British Columbia in 1993. Four of these vessels underwent vehicle capacity increases three times. The lead ship of the class, Queen of Victoria suffered significant damage in a collision in 1970.

Two of the ferries are also known as the Burnaby class, built between 1964 and 1965. There are two ships in this class are Queen of Burnaby and Queen of Nanaimo. Both are propelled by controllable-pitch propellers. Both were built with two Mirrlees National KVSSM, V-16, 4 stroke-cycle, diesel engines, each producing 3,000 brake horsepower (2,200 kW) at 320 revolutions per minute.

The vessels began to be retired in 2000. Four vessels were to be retired and sold in 2008. The transfer of Queen of Esquimalt was halted and she was broken up in Ensenada, Mexico. Both Queen of Nanaimo and Queen of Burnaby were retired in 2017. Queen of New Westminster is still in service with BC Ferries. Queen of Nanaimo was sold to a ferry company in Fiji and was eventually sold for scrap in June 2022.

== Background ==
In 1958, the premier of British Columbia W.A.C. Bennett authorised the creation of a provincial ferry service. The new service, known as the British Columbia Ferry Corporation ordered two ships constructed from shipyards in British Columbia which became the Sidney-class ferries. The initial success of the first two led BC Ferries to order a further two new ships similar to the Sidney class, but with modifications based on lessons learned from the first two ships. The new ships would be also be designed by the naval architect Philip F. Spaulding and his Canadian partner Arthur McLaren but this time, BC Ferries would purchase the plans for the ships and not have to pay royalty payments. Ordered in 1961, the two new ships were initially named City of Victoria and City of Vancouver. The vessels were renamed to Queen of Victoria and Queen of Vancouver due to a change in fleetwide naming policy based on CP Ships naming their vessels "Princess". As a result, the larger vessels of the British Columbia Ferries fleet would have "Queen" placed in front of their original names and the smaller ones have it added to the end. The V class were intended to replace the ships BC Ferries had received from the Black Ball Line during its creation.

== Ships in class ==
Construction data
Name	Builder	Launched	Completed	Fate
Queen of Victoria (ex-City of Victoria)	Victoria Machinery Depot, Victoria, British Columbia	24 October 1961	February 1962	sold 2001, renamed Queen of Ocoa, then Aan, scrapped 2006
Queen of Vancouver (ex-City of Vancouver)	Burrard Dry Dock, North Vancouver, British Columbia	16 January 1962	April 1962	Broken up for scrap 2012
Queen of Saanich	Victoria Machinery Depot, Victoria	28 November 1962	February 1963	Broken up for scrap 2012
Queen of Esquimalt	Victoria Machinery Depot, Victoria	22 January 1963	March 1963	Sold 2010, renamed Princess Jacqueline, broken up 2011
Queen of Nanaimo	Victoria Machinery Depot, Victoria	3 December 1963	June 1964	Sold 2017, renamed Lomaiviti Princess V, broken up 2022
Queen of New Westminster	Victoria Machinery Depot, Victoria	12 May 1964	July 1964	Active
Queen of Burnaby	Victoria Machinery Depot, Victoria	15 February 1965	May 1965	Sold 1994, renamed Royal Victorian, then Princess Marguerite III, reacquired 2000 and regained original name. Retired 2017.

== Description ==
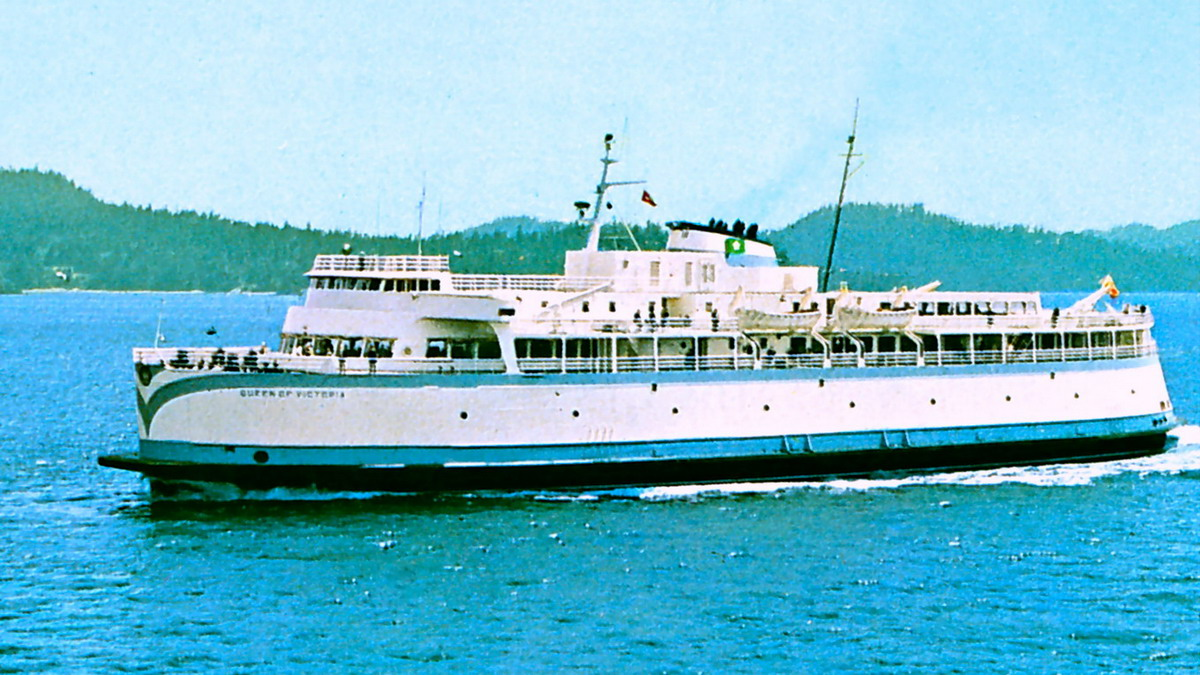
Queen of Victoria in 1964, showing how the V-class ferries looked as first built

As originally built, the vessels were of similar designs but with different engines. The ships of the class were built in three batches. The first two (Queen of Victoria and Queen of Vancouver measured 104.3 metres (342 ft 2 in) long overall and 93.8 m (307 ft 9 in) between perpendiculars with a beam of 24 m (78 ft 9 in). They were assessed at 3,541 gross register tons (GRT). They were powered by twin Paxman diesel engines giving the vessels a maximum speed of 18 knots (33 km/h; 21 mph). The Paxman engines were cheaper to acquire than the Mirrlees diesels in the preceding Sidney class. The first batch had a 106-car capacity and mainly cosmetic differences from the Sidney class, though the class was designed with future expansion in mind.

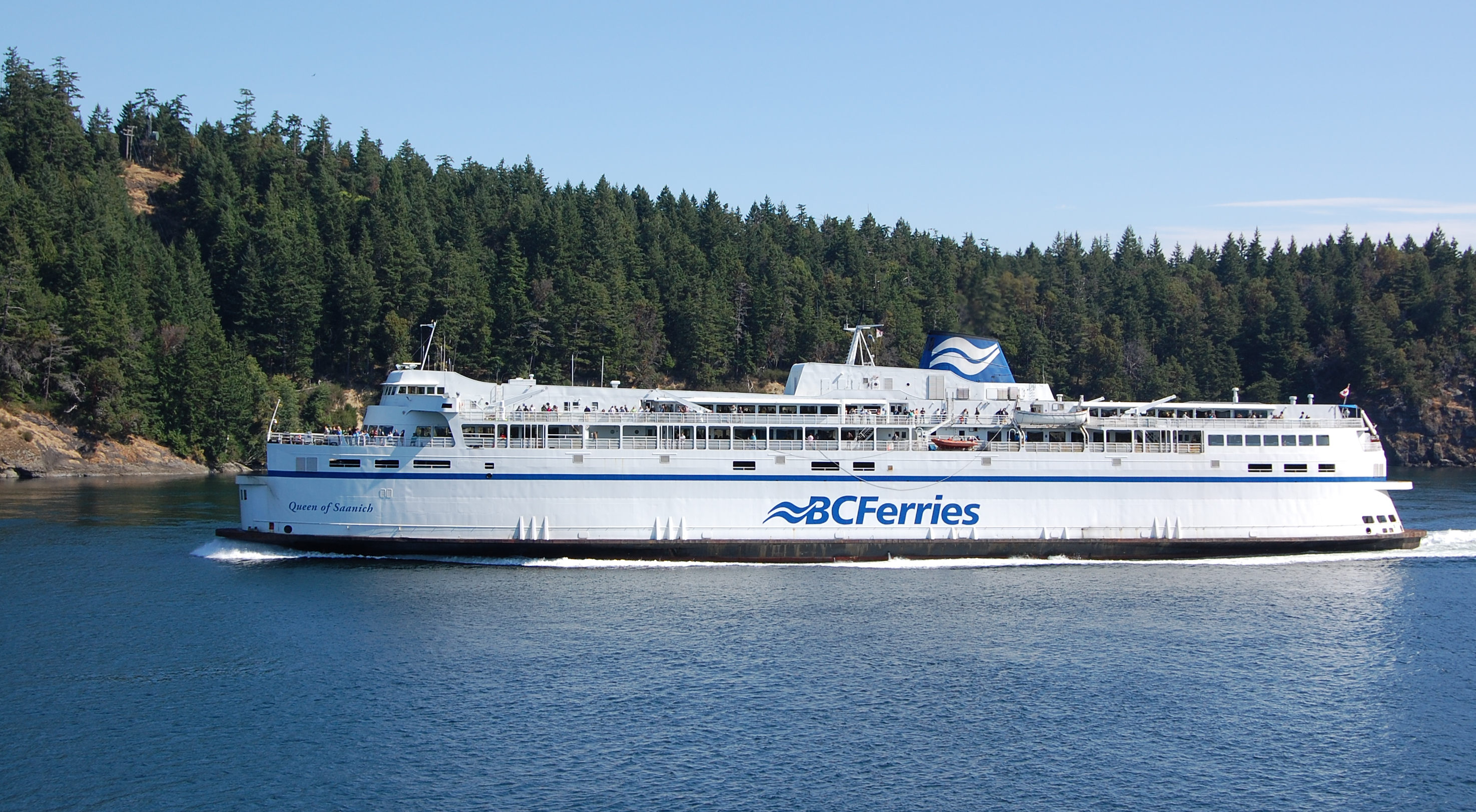
Queen of Saanich

The next batch of Queen of Saanich and Queen of Esquimalt had a length overall of 104.2 m (341 ft 10 in) and 94 m (308 ft 5 in) between perpendiculars with a beam of 23.9 m (78 ft 5 in) and were assessed at 3,547 GRT. The Paxman engines in the first batch had proved to be problematic, so BC Ferries had Fairbanks-Morse diesel engines installed in these two with no difference in speed. The second batch had an original car capacity of 145 and could transport 1,000 passengers.

The final batch of three, Queen of Burnaby, Queen of Nanaimo and Queen of New Westminster returned to the Mirrlees diesels of the Sidney class as the Fairbanks-Morse engines turned out to be just as problematic as the Paxmans. The third batch ships measured 104.4 m (342 ft 6 in) overall, 93.8 m (307 ft 9 in) between perpendiculars with a beam of 23.9 m (78 ft 5 in). Queen of Nanaimo was initially assessed at 3,545 GRT Queen of New Westminster at 3,544 GRT and Queen of Burnaby at 3,542 GRT.

=== Modifications ===
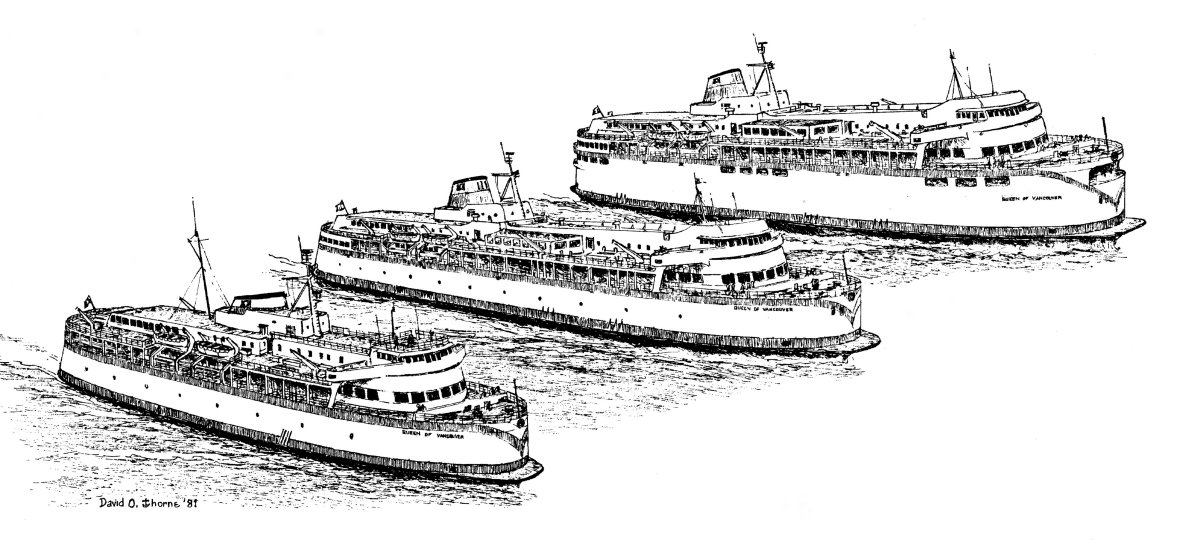
A drawing showing what Queen of Vancouver looked like when she was built (bottom), after being stretched (center), and after the upper car deck was added (top).

The seven ships were modified twice in quick succession to increase vehicle capacity. The first refit was the installation of ramps and platform car decks in 1968 that increased car capacity. The second beginning in 1971 saw the ships sliced in half vertically across the beam for the insertion of a new 25.6-metre (84 ft) midsection, which dramatically increased their capacity. Beyond increasing the length of the ships, a new deluxe restaurant was added seating 48 persons, a 190-seat self-service cafeteria was installed, carpets and wall paneling and an open solarium was to the boat deck. The new midsections were pre-constructed to limit the time the ferries were out of service, turning it into a roughly three-month refit. During the refit, 129 hydraulic jacks were welded into place and were used to open the ship up for the midsections to be slid into place.

The first batch now had capacity for 192 cars and 1,250 passengers. They measured 120 m (395 ft) registered and 129.95 m (426 ft 4 in) long overall with a 23.95 m (78 ft 7 in) beam and a draught of 4.0 m (13 ft) and were assessed at 4,901 GRT, 3,321 net register tons (NRT) for Queen of Vancouver and 4,900 GRT and 3,314 NRT for Queen of Victoria. Their Paxman twin diesels created 4,969 kilowatts (6,664 horsepower) and a speed of 18 knots. They had a crew of 55. The second batch had the same capacity but measured 120 m (394 ft) registered and 130 m (426 ft) long overall with a 22.73 m (74 ft 7 in) beam and a 4.0 m draught. Their Fairbanks-Morse diesels created 4,800 kW (6,400 hp) and they retained their 18-knot speed. They were assessed at 4,907 GRT, 3,324.84 NRT for Queen of Saanich, and 4,890 GRT, 3,317 NRT for Queen of Esquimalt. The third batch's Mirlees diesels created 4,500 kW (6,000 hp) and the ships varied in size, with all ships retaining the 4.0 m draught, and similar capacity with the first two batches. Queen of Burnaby now measured 121.44 m (398 ft 5 in) registered and 130 m (426 ft) long overall with a beam of 78 ft 7 1/2 in (23.965 m) and assessed at 4,890 GRT and 3,346 NRT. Queen of New Westminster measured 120 m (394 ft) registered with the same length overall and beam as Queen of Burnaby, but was assessed at 4,904 GRT and 3,341 NRT. (Note: Favelle does not have data for Queen of Nanaimo as the ship's refit was not completed at the time of publishing but the author states that the vessel had similar characteristics with the other ships of the third batch.)

Beginning in 1981, the first four of the seven ships were cut horizontally from bow to stern to have a new vehicle deck inserted. These rebuilt ships retained the V-class designation. Car capacity increased to 400 for Queen of Esquimalt and Queen of Saanich, while Queen of Vancouver and Queen of Victoria increased to 284, as they retained extra room for overheight vehicles. During this refit, the ships all received new MaK diesel engines to replace the problematic Paxman and Fairbanks-Morse models.

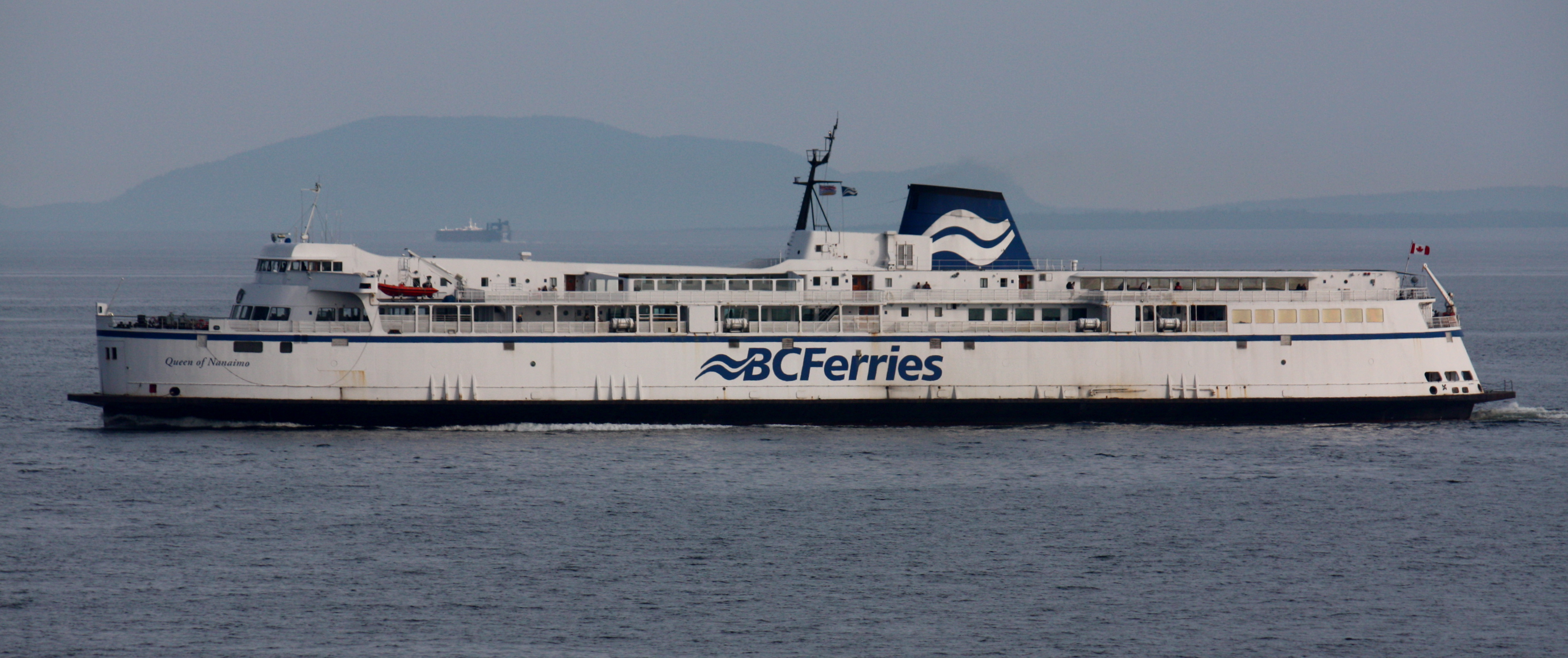
Queen of Nanaimo

Queen of Burnaby and Queen of Nanaimo were two original ships without the new car deck; they received a new designation as Burnaby-class vessels. Queen of New Westminster was lifted in 1991 and was fit with new Wartsila 9R-32D diesel engines to travel at 20 knots (37 km/h; 23 mph) comparable to the newer C-class ferries. The engines create 3,375 kW (4,526 hp) each for a total of 13,500 kW (18,100 hp). She had a major refit of her passenger areas completed in 2009, preparing her for another ten to fifteen years of service. The vessel measures 129.9 m (426 ft 2 in) with a beam of 23.9 m (78 ft 5 in), has a passenger and crew capacity of 1,332 and a car capacity of 254.

== Service history ==
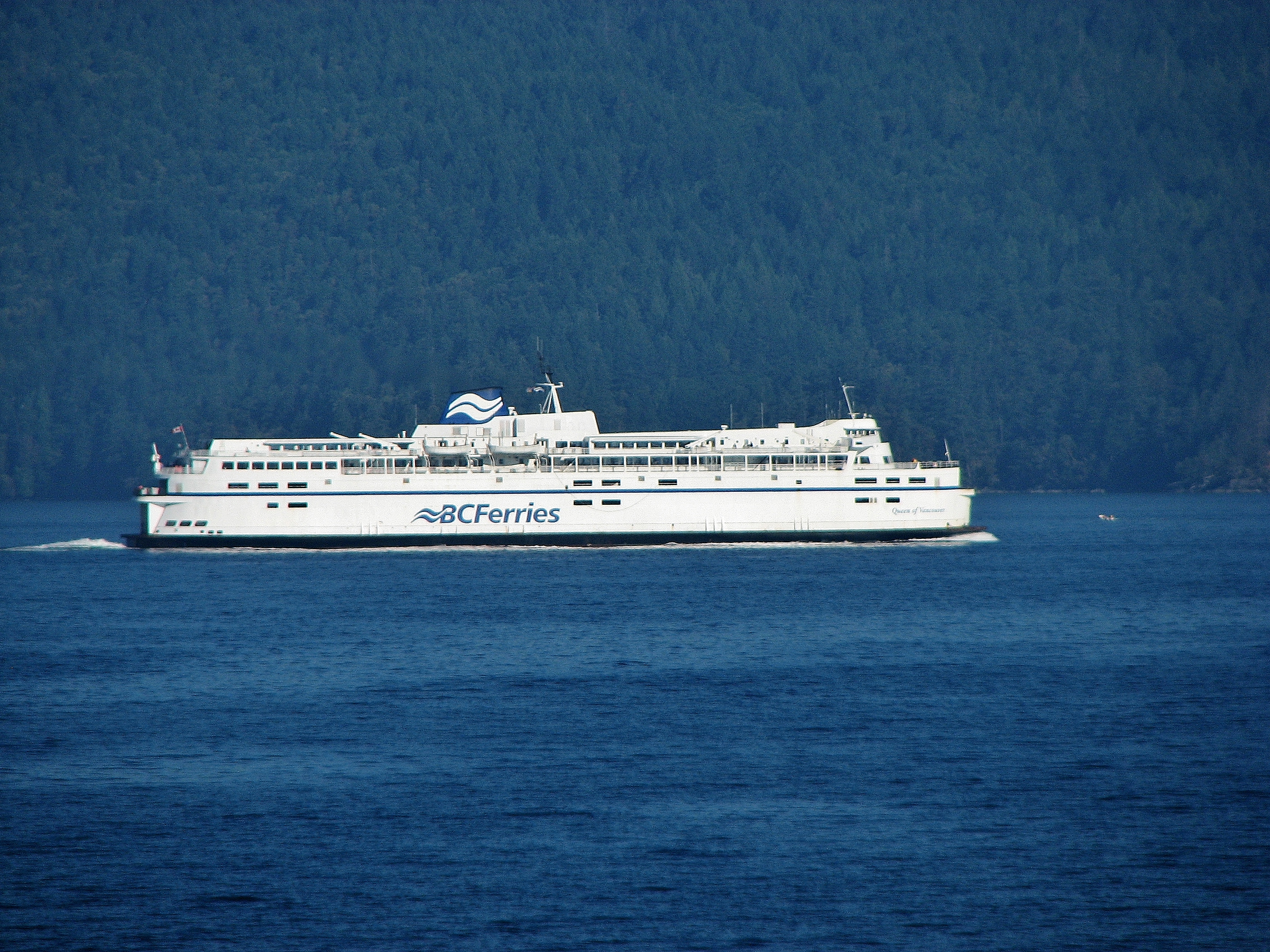
Queen of Vancouver

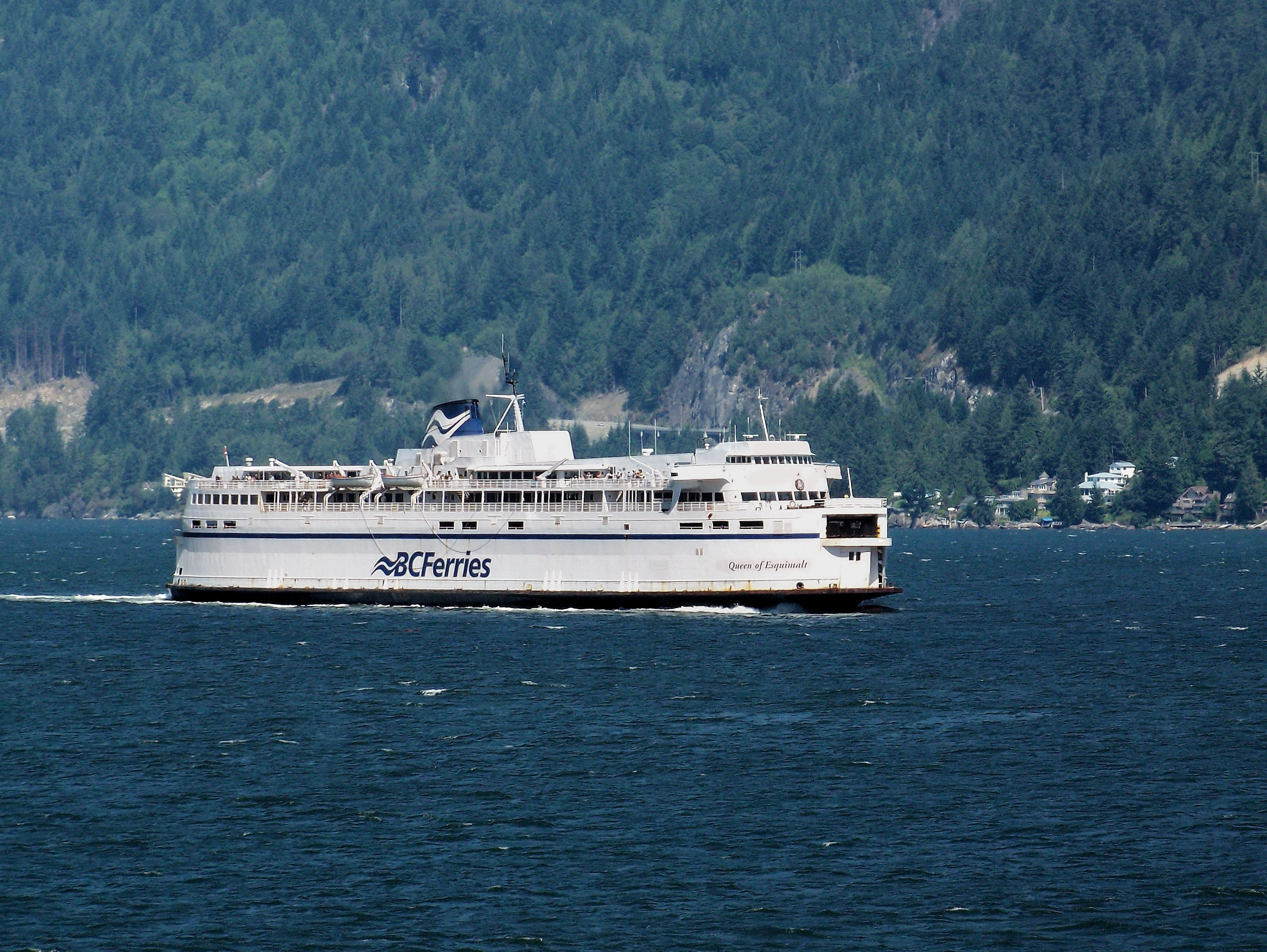
Queen of Esquimalt in Howe Sound, sailing from Langdale to Horseshoe Bay

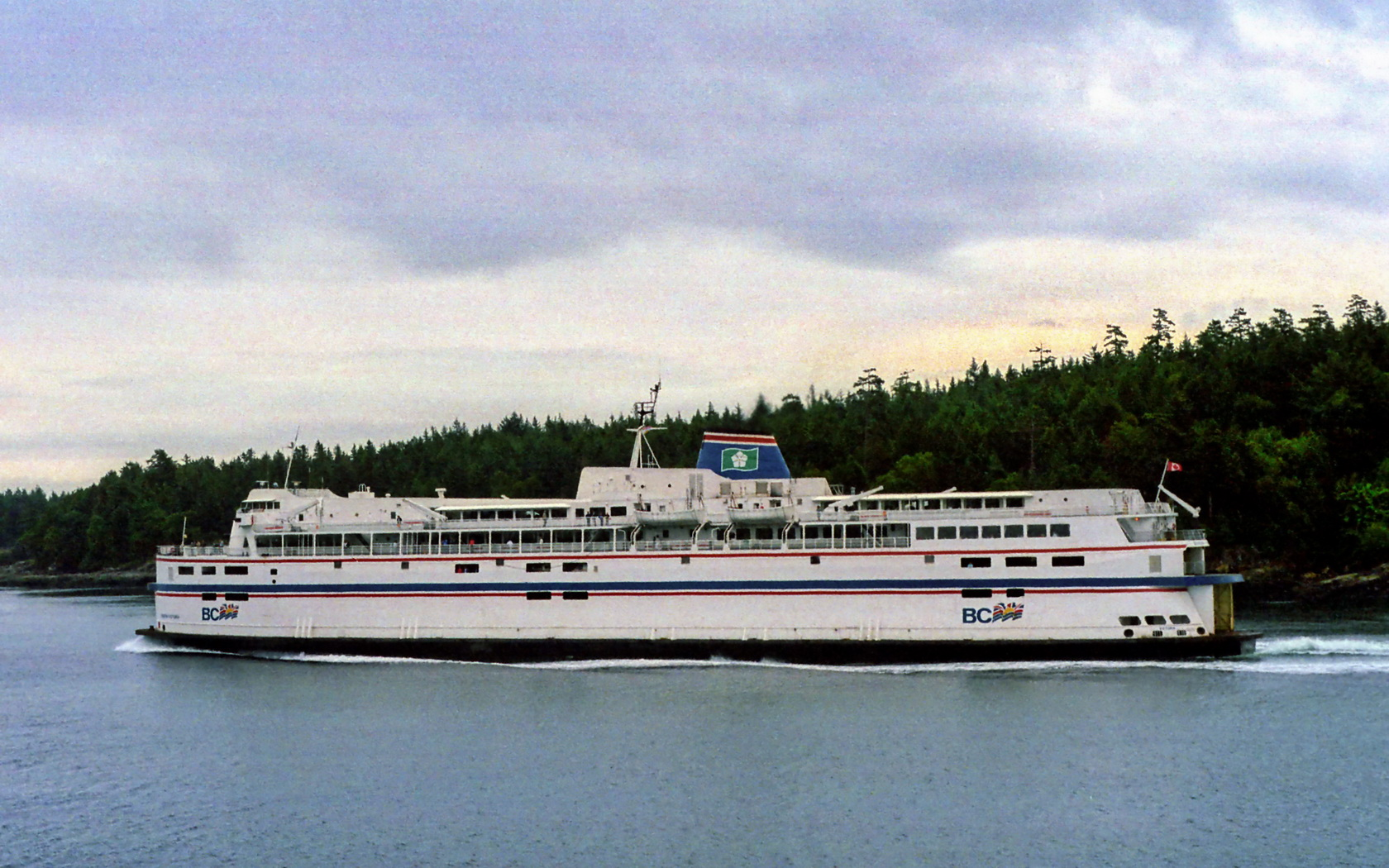
Queen of Victoria

Queen of Vancouver and Queen of Victoria entered service in 1962. They were followed by Queen of Saanich and Queen of Esquimalt. The vessels served on the Tsawwassen – Swartz Bay route. Queen of Nanaimo, Queen of New Westminster and Queen of Burnaby were the last to enter service and operated on the Departure Bay – Horseshoe Bay route. Queen of New Westminster remains in service.

On 2 August 1970, Queen of Victoria was in transit through Active Pass with 626 passengers when the ferry was struck by the Soviet freighter Sergey Yesenin. Three passengers were killed in the incident and Queen of Victoria suffered significant damage, with the Soviet ship suffering minor damage. The results of the investigation found that the pilot aboard Sergey Yesenin was mainly at fault, though the master of Queen of Victoria was not spared blame. Queen of Victoria was towed back to port.

In 1992, while Queen of New Westminster was loading passengers and vehicles at Departure Bay, a van was directed to stop on the apron of the shore loading ramp to the upper deck of the ship. While the van was stopped, the ship began to depart, leaving the apron without support and causing the van to fall first onto Queen of New Westminster's deck and then into the water. Three people died in the incident, with three survivors (one suffering serious injury). BC Ferries was later found to be at fault in the following investigation.

In 1994, Queen of Burnaby was temporarily leased to another provincial crown corporation called Victoria Line. The vessel was renamed Royal Victorian, had a $4.7 million refit, and operated a once-daily summer service between Victoria and Seattle. After the demise of the Victoria Line, the vessel was purchased by Clipper Navigation, which operates the Victoria Clipper passenger-only service between Victoria and Seattle. The vessel was then renamed and repainted to become Princess Marguerite III, operating on the Victoria to Seattle route. In 2000, after Clipper Navigation also decided to end service on the route, the vessel was returned to the BC Ferries fleet under her original name, Queen of Burnaby.

Queen of Victoria was the first to be retired in 2001. The ship was sold to R & G Importadora & Exportadora of the Dominican Republic. and renamed Queen of Ocoa. Queen of Ocoa was scrapped in 2006 at Alang, India.

Queen of Esquimalt was retired on 25 May 2008. The vessel was sold to Dalian Golden Sun I/E Co., Ltd. and docked in Port Alberni and renamed Princess Jacqueline. The ship was intended for further service in China, but Princess Jacqueline never left British Columbia waters and the sale was eventually halted due to court action. In 2011 the vessel was scrapped at Ensenada, Mexico.

Queen of Saanich was retired on 18 November 2008 and sold. The vessel was renamed Owen Bell and used as a logging camp on the coast of the Vancouver Island. The ship was later moved to be moored on the west side of Anvil Island in Howe Sound. Owen Bell was scrapped in 2012 at Ensenada, Mexico. Queen of Vancouver was the next to be taken out of service on 15 April 2009. The ferry was sold to Coast Marine and moored at Woodfibre until 2012. The ship was then sent for scrapping at Ensenada, Mexico.

Queen of Burnaby was retired in May 2017 (replaced by MV Salish Orca) and Queen of Nanaimo was retired in September 2017 (replaced by MV Salish Eagle). Queen of Nanaimo was sold to Goundar Shipping Ltd. of Fiji for service in the island nation. The ship was renamed Lomaiviti Princess V and services Savusavu and Kadavu Island. In June 2022, the ship was sold for scrap to a breaking yard in Alang, India. Queen of Burnaby was no longer fit for sailing and was sold in 2018 on the condition that it be kept moored or scrapped. However, the sale was not finalized and the vessel remains in Union Bay, British Columbia.

Queen of Burnaby and Queen of Nanaimo were replaced by three 145-car Salish-class ferries. The larger Queen of New Westminster, which had a major refit of her passenger areas completed in 2009, is expected to see another ten to fifteen years of service and is the sole survivor of the original seven ships.

== Citations ==
Preceded by Sidney class	BC Ferries flagship 1962–1985	Succeeded by Queen of the North
