= Sidney-class ferry =

Canadian roll-on/roll-off ferries

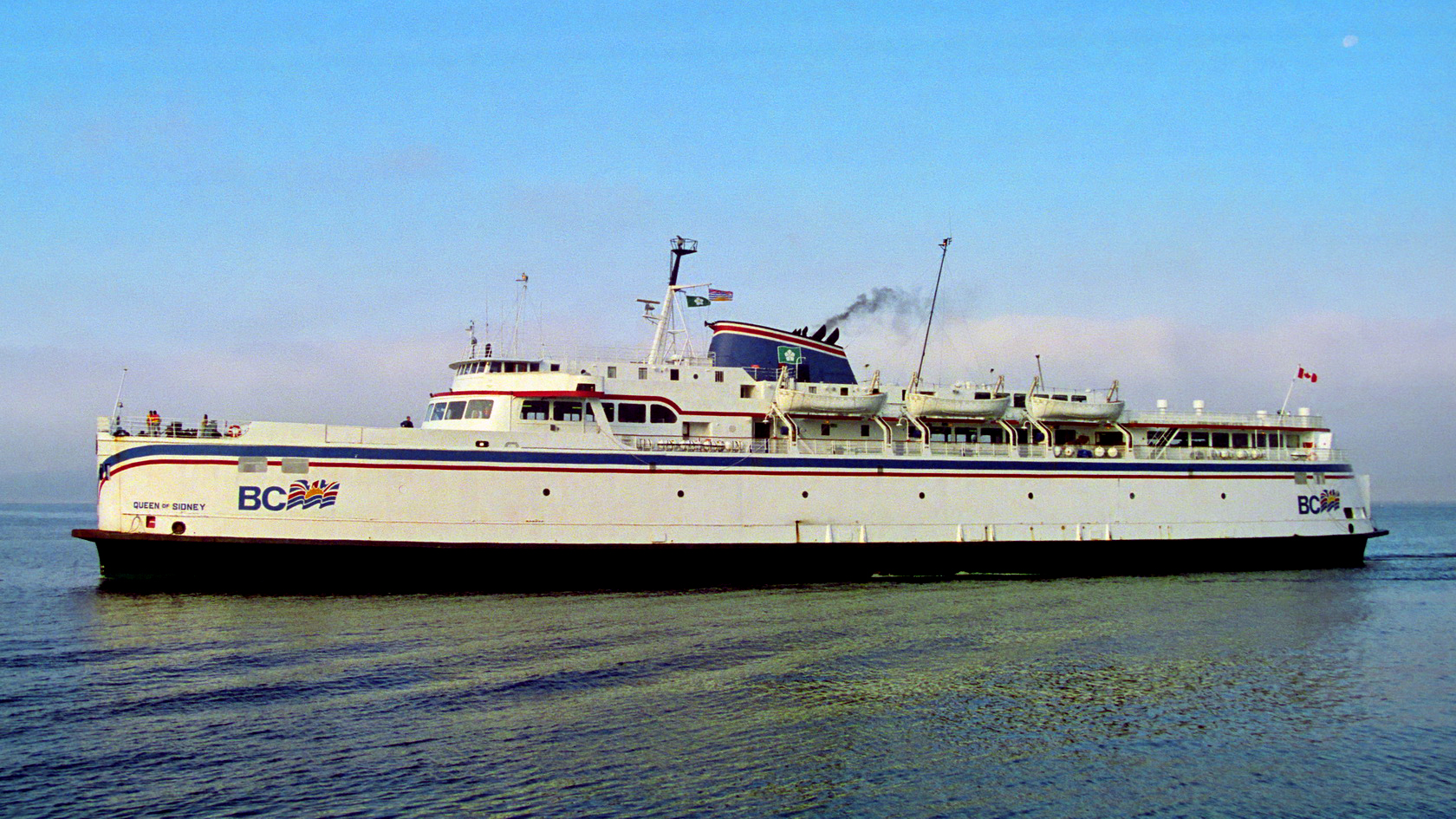
- Queen of Sidney entering the Westview terminal at Powell River in August 1993.

Class overview
- Name: Sidney class
- Builders: Victoria Machinery Depot, Victoria; Burrard Dry Dock Co. Ltd., North Vancouver
- Operators: BC Ferries
- Succeeded by: Victoria class
- Built: 1959–1960
- In service: 1960–2007
- Completed: 2
- Retired: 2

General characteristics for Queen of Sidney as built
- Type: Roll-on/roll-off ferry
- Tonnage: 2,976 GRT; 702 DWT
- Length: 102.4 m (335 ft 11 in) oa; 93.8 m (307 ft 9 in) pp
- Beam: 22.6 m (74 ft 2 in)
- Installed power: Diesel engines
- Propulsion: Two shafts
- Speed: 18 knots (33 km/h; 21 mph)

The Sidney class consisted of two roll-on/roll-off ferries, Queen of Sidney and Queen of Tsawwassen, built for the British Columbia Ferry Corporation in service from 1960 to 2008. The design for the ships was based on the ferry MV Coho with changes made to accommodate loading of vehicles through the bow of the vessel. Both vessels serviced different routes throughout their service lives.

== Design and description ==
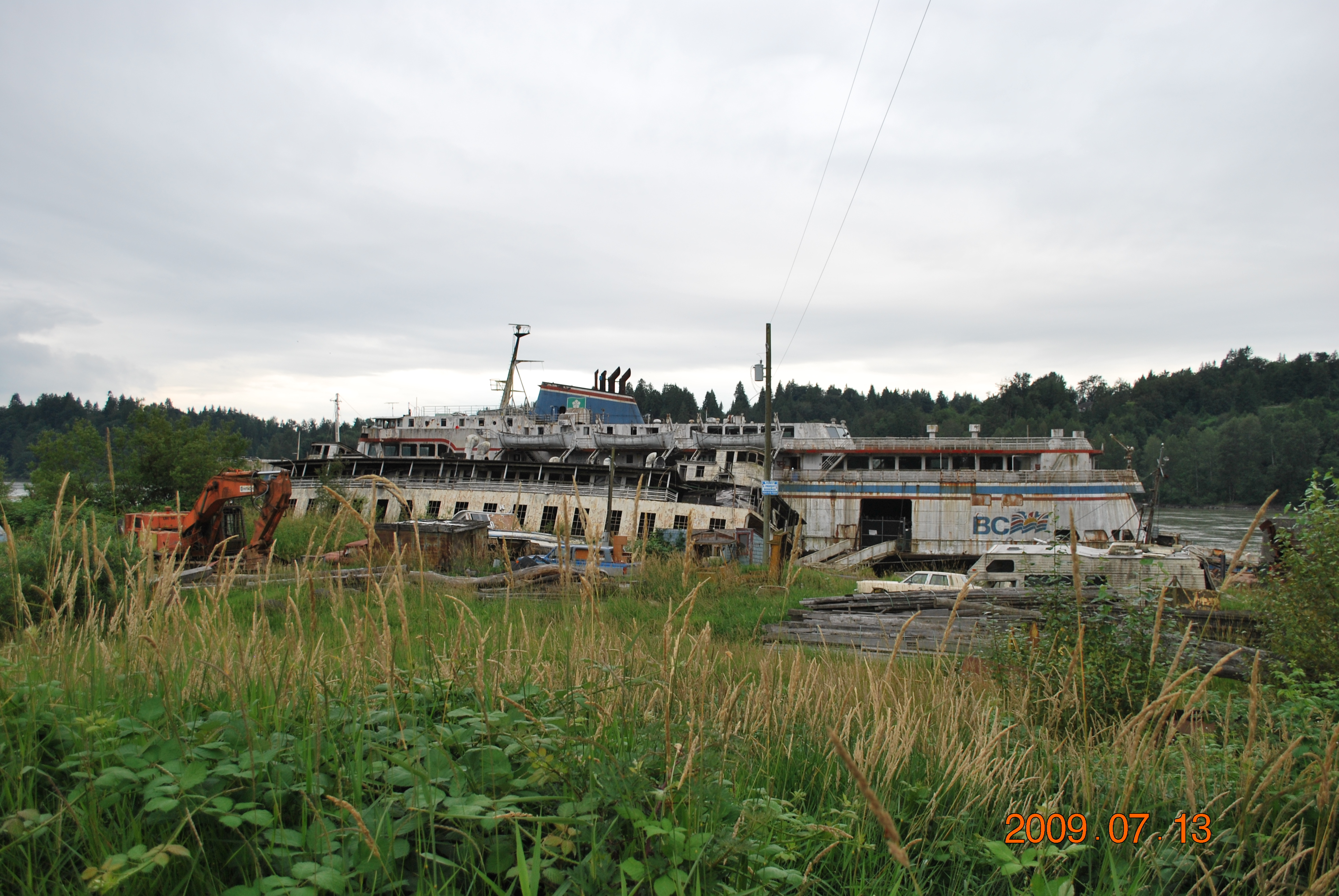
Queen of Sidney sitting on the Fraser River in 2009

Design of the two roll-on/roll-off ferries, Queen of Sidney and Queen of Tsawwassen, was based on a ferry that was under construction for Black Ball Transport, MV Coho for international service along the British Columbia and Washington coasts. Coho's design was altered by the original naval architect Philip F. Spaulding and his Canadian partner Arthur McLaren to allow the Canadian vessels to accept vehicle loading at both bow and stern. Both ships were 102.4 m (335 ft 11 in) long overall and 93.8 m (307 ft 9 in) between perpendiculars with a beam of 22.6 m (74 ft 2 in). The ships were powered by 16-cylinder Mirrless twin diesel engines creating 4,500 kW (6,000 hp) turning two screws with a maximum speed of 18 knots (33 km/h; 21 mph). The ships had different tonnages when built; Queen of Sidney was initially measured at 2,976 gross register tons (GRT) and 702 tons deadweight (DWT), while Queen of Tsawwassen was measured at 3,127 GRT and 980 DWT. As built, the vessels had a car capacity of 108, however in 1971, additional platforms were added to the car decks increasing capacity to 138.

== Ships ==
Construction data
Name	Builder	Laid down	Launched	Completed	Fate
Queen of Sidney (ex-Sidney)	Victoria Machinery Depot, Victoria, British Columbia	May 9, 1959	October 6, 1959	May 1960	Laid up in Fraser River in 2001. Burned on May 3, 2025
Queen of Tsawwassen (ex-Tsawwassen)	Burrard Dry Dock, Vancouver, British Columbia	May 9, 1959	November 28, 1959	May 1960	Sold 2008

== Construction and career ==
In 1958, the premier of British Columbia W.A.C. Bennett authorised the creation of a provincial ferry service. The new service, known as the British Columbia Ferry Corporation ordered two ships constructed from shipyards in British Columbia. Sidney was ordered from Victoria Machinery Depot in Victoria, with the yard number 85 and was laid down on May 9, 1959. The vessel was launched on October 6, 1959 and completed in May 1960. Tsawwassen was built by Burrard Dry Dock in Vancouver with the yard number 309 and was laid down on May 9, 1959. The ferry was launched on November 28, 1959 and completed in May 1960. Both ships began service on June 15, 1960 servicing two terminals linking Victoria and Vancouver. In 1962, Tsawwassen was renamed Queen of Tsawwassen and in 1963, Sidney was renamed Queen of Sidney. This was due to change in fleetwide naming policy based on CP Ships naming their vessels "Princess". As a result, the larger vessels of the British Columbia Ferries fleet would have "Queen" placed in front of their original names and the smaller ones have it added to the end.

The two ships spent almost all of their service life identical to when they were constructed, except for an expansion of the restaurant areas, due to unexpected food demand shortly after they commenced service.

Queen of Sidney was retired in November 2000. The decommissioned ferry was sold to Bob and Gerald Tapp for CAN$100,000 in 2002 and renamed Bad Adventure. The ship was sent to a shipyard in Mission, British Columbia, where it has sat ever since. Queen of Tsawwassen was taken out of service in 2007. This was due to the ship no longer capable of meeting government regulations and a refit being cost prohibitive. An I-class ferry was ordered to replace the ship. The vessel was put up for sale in 2008.

On May 3, 2025, shortly before 2 am, the city of Mission activated its Emergency Operations Centre in response to an out of control fire aboard Queen of Sidney. The Royal Canadian Mounted Police began investigating the incident immediately and were treating the blaze as "suspicious."

== Citations ==
Preceded by	BC Ferries flagship 1960–1962	Succeeded by Victoria-class ferries
