= Theodore I. Spaulding =

American politician

Member of the South Dakota Senate
- In office 1977–1978

Personal details
- Born: September 28, 1913
- Died: January 4, 2002 (aged 88)
- Party: Republican
- Education: Huron College

Theodore I. Spaulding (September 28, 1913 – January 4, 2002) was an American politician. He served as a Republican member of the South Dakota Senate.

== Life and career ==
Spaulding attended Huron College.

Spaulding served in the South Dakota Senate from 1977 to 1978.

Spaulding died on January 4, 2002, at the age of 88.
