= Spalding Township, Michigan =

- Civil township
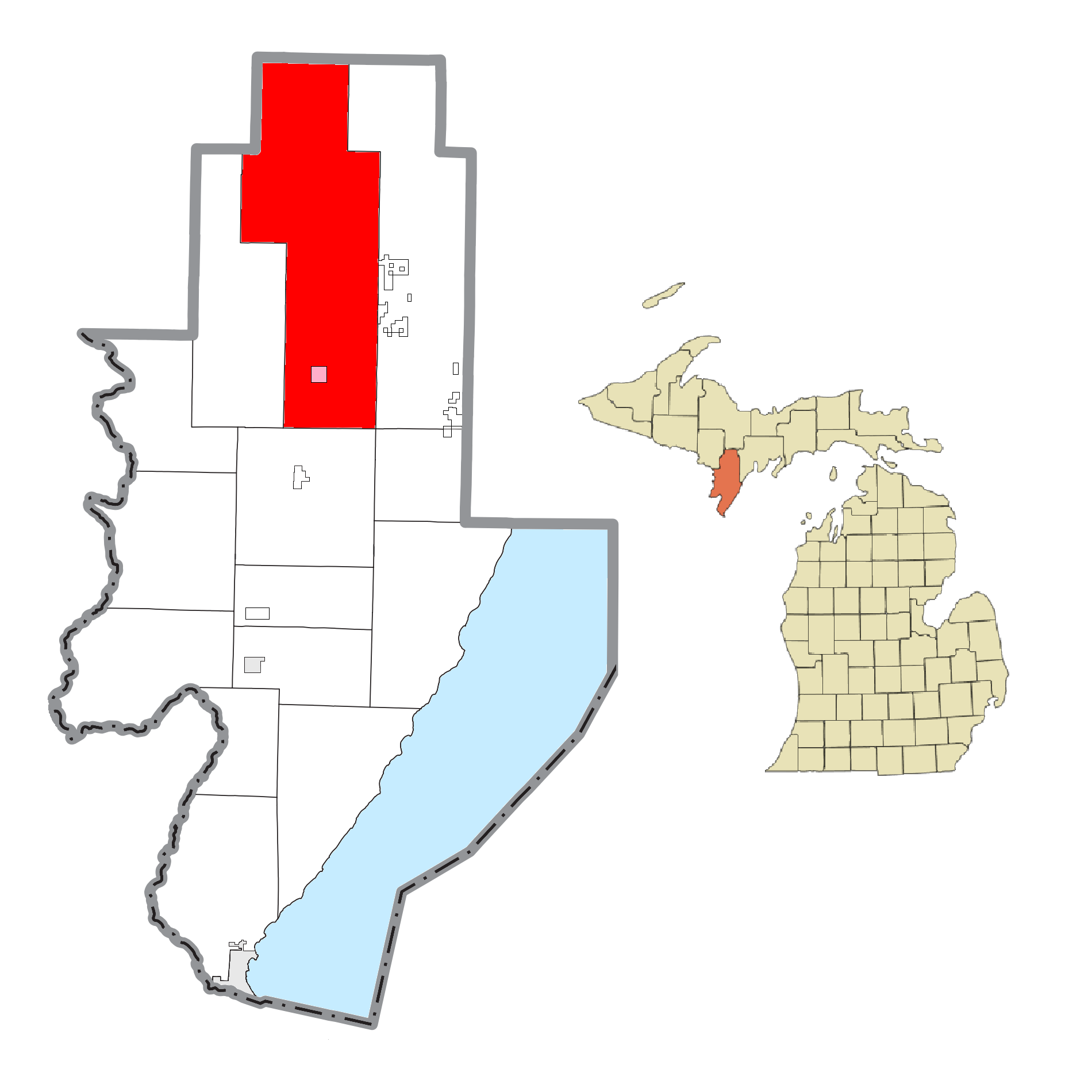
- Location within Menominee County (red) and the state of Michigan; administered village of Powers in pink

- Location within Michigan Location within the United States
- Coordinates: 45°45′34″N 87°31′42″W
- Country: United States
- State: Michigan
- County: Menominee
- Settled: 1871

Government
  - Supervisor: James Moraska

Area
  - Total: 163.0 sq mi (422 km^{2})
  - Land: 162.6 sq mi (421 km^{2})
  - Water: 0.4 sq mi (1.0 km^{2})
- Elevation: 912 ft (278 m)

Population (2020)
  - Total: 1,599
  - Density: 9.8/sq mi (3.8/km^{2})
- Time zone: UTC-6 (Central (CST))
  - Summer (DST): UTC-5 (CDT)
- ZIP Codes: 49874 (Powers); 49886 (Spalding); 49873 (Perronville)
- Area code: 906
- FIPS code: 26-109-75350
- GNIS feature ID: 1627101
- Website: www.powers-spalding.org

Spalding Township is a civil township of Menominee County in the U.S. state of Michigan. The population was 1,599 at the 2020 census. It is named after Jesse Spalding (1833–1904), who operated a steam sawmill at the village in the township that now bears his name.

== Geography ==
The township is in northern Menominee County, extending 24 miles (39 km) from north to south. It is bordered to the north by Marquette County. According to the United States Census Bureau, the township has a total area of 163.0 square miles (422 km^{2}), of which 162.6 square miles (421 km^{2}) are land and 0.4 square miles (1.0 km^{2}), or 0.24%, are water. Most of the township is drained by the Cedar River, which flows south and east toward Green Bay on Lake Michigan. The river passes between the communities of Powers and Spalding in the southern part of the township. The northern part of the township is drained by the West Branch of the Ford River, a southeast-flowing tributary of Lake Michigan.

== Communities ==
- The village of Powers is in the southwest part of the township, at the junction of U.S. Routes 2 and 41.
- The unincorporated community of Spalding is in the southeast part of the township, bordered to the west by Powers. U.S. Route 2 and 41 run concurrently through the community, leading east to Escanaba.

== Demographics ==
Historical population
Census	Pop.	Note	%±
1880	1,131		—
1890	1,915		69.3%
1900	3,326		73.7%
1910	1,759		−47.1%
1920	1,377		−21.7%
1930	1,406		2.1%
1940	1,555		10.6%
1950	1,634		5.1%
1960	1,382		−15.4%
1970	1,632		18.1%
1980	1,842		12.9%
1990	1,536		−16.6%
2000	1,761		14.6%
2010	1,674		−4.9%
2020	1,599		−4.5%
U.S. Decennial Census

As of the census of 2000, there were 1,761 people, 625 households, and 426 families residing in the township. By 2020, its population was 1,599.
