= Union Bay Post Office =

Canadian post office building

Coordinates: 49°35′00.5″N 124°53′10.5″W

The Union Bay Post Office in the community of Union Bay, Comox Valley Regional District, British Columbia, Canada, was built in 1913 and is one of only two old wooden post offices left in Canada. The main floor of the building is still used by Canada Post to serve the Union Bay area.

The post office also serves as a sorting point for the communities of Denman Island, Hornby Island, and Fanny Bay. The building was rescued by the local historical society in the 1990s when it was put up for sale. The society restored the building's interior to include original fittings and brass wicket. The post office is the jewel of what is called "Heritage Row" in Union Bay and was given heritage building status after the restoration.
