= British Columbia Highway 19 =

Highway on Vancouver Island in British Columbia

Highway 19
- Island Highway; Inland Island Highway
- Highway 19 highlighted in red.

Route information
- Maintained by the Ministry of Transportation and Infrastructure
- Length: 403 km (250 mi)
- Existed: 1953–present

Major junctions
- South end: Duke Point Ferry Terminal
- Highway 1 (TCH) in Nanaimo; Highway 19A south in Nanaimo; Highway 19A north at Craig's Crossing; Highway 4A near Parksville; Highway 4 near Qualicum Beach; Highway 19A / Highway 28 in Campbell River; Highway 30 between Port McNeill and Port Hardy
- North end: Bear Cove Ferry Terminal

Location
- Country: Canada
- Province: British Columbia
- Regional districts: Nanaimo, Comox Valley, Strathcona, Mount Waddington
- Major cities: Nanaimo, Parksville, Campbell River

Highway system
- British Columbia provincial highways
| ← Highway 18 | → Highway 19A |

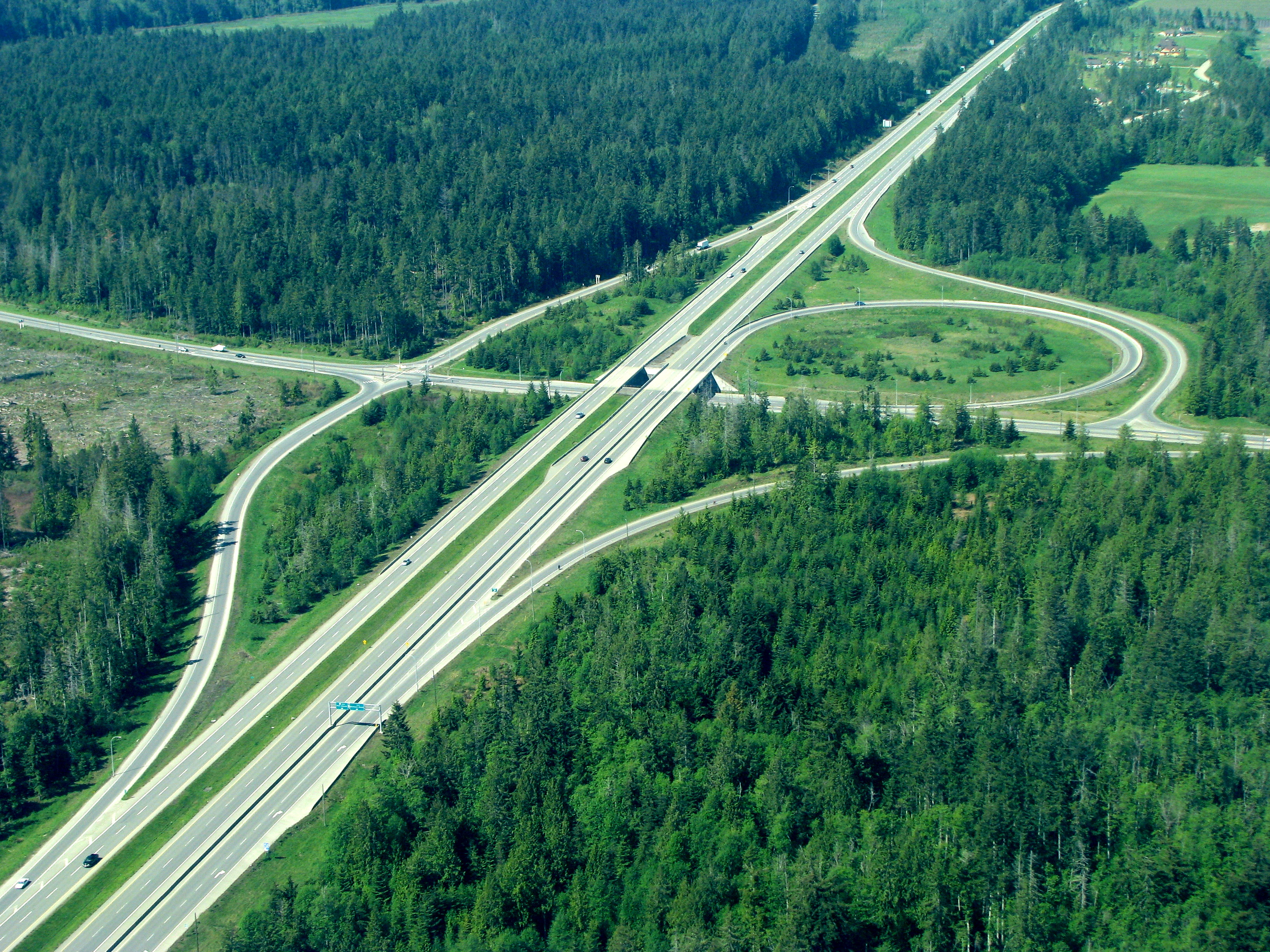
Highway 19, Exit 60 interchange with Highway 4 at Qualicum Beach looking WSW

Highway 19 is the main north–south thoroughfare on Vancouver Island from Nanaimo to Port Hardy. It forms part of the Island Highway along with Highway 1 and Highway 19A. A highway has existed on the Island since about 1912. Originally gravel and rough, the highway was an essential link together with the Esquimalt & Nanaimo Railway. The paved highway first opened in 1953, replacing a stretch of Highway 1 between Nanaimo and Campbell River, finally being extended to the northern tip of the island in the late 1970s. The total length of the highway is 403 kilometres (250 mi).

== Route description ==
=== North Island ===
Highway 19's northern end is located at the Bear Cove ferry terminal, across the bay from Port Hardy. The highway proceeds southwest from the ferry dock for 5 km (3.1 mi) to a junction with the main road to the centre of Port Hardy, then turns southeast, travelling for 16 km (9.9 mi) to Highway 30, and then further east for 20 km (12 mi) along the main road to Port McNeill. The highway then follows the eastern shore of Nimpkish Lake and the Nimpkish River through a long stretch of dense forest terrain for 64 km (40 mi) southeast, until reaching a junction with the community of Woss, then travelling another 65 km east (40 mi), through the boundary between the Regional Districts of Mount Waddington and Strathcona, to a junction with Sayward, and finally entering the city of Campbell River another 64 km (40 mi) southeast, at a junction with Highways 28 and 19A, just past the river that the city is named for.

The entire stretch of Highway 19 north of Campbell River is an undivided two-lane configuration. Once at the junction with Highways 28 and 19A, Highway 19 separates into an expressway configuration, built between 1996 and 2001. In Campbell River, the highway shares its northbound lanes with Tamarac Street, and its southbound lanes with Willow Street.

=== Inland Island Highway ===
The 128-kilometre (80 mi) portion of Highway 19 between Campbell River and the city of Parksville is known as the "Inland Island Highway". The highway completely avoids any residential or urban areas and alternates between a divided four-lane expressway and freeway, with a nominal speed limit of 110 km/h (68 mph) and a 90-kilometre-per-hour (56 mph) speed limit near signal lights.

South from Campbell River, Highway 19 is divided primarily by a concrete wall, and goes through a series of six spaced out at-grade signalized intersections, five of them possessing exit numbers. 52 km (32 mi) south of Campbell River, Highway 19 reaches its first interchange, with a four-lane, arterial highway that goes west to the village of Cumberland and east to the communities of Courtenay and Comox. Past the Courtenay Interchange, Highway 19 is divided by a grass median. 16 km (9.9 mi) later, Highway 19 reaches another interchange, this time with a two-lane road that goes a short distance east to the BC Ferries terminal at Buckley Bay. There are two small, at-grade, signalized intersections on Highway 19 in 41 km (25 mi) between the Buckley Bay Interchange and the interchange with Highway 4, which goes north into Qualicum Beach. 9 km (5.6 mi) later, Highway 19 goes through another interchange, this time with Highway 4A, which goes east into Parksville. The next interchange, at Craig's Crossing, is another 5 km south (3 mi) where Highway 19A (Island Highway) rejoins Highway 19, marking the end of the freeway and the Inland Island Highway.

=== Island Highway ===
Past the Craig's Crossing Interchange, Highway 19 resumes its 1953 Island Highway alignment, which today is a 4-lane, divided arterial highway with a concrete median barrier mostly constructed during the 1970s. It heads mostly southeast through the communities of Nanoose Bay and Lantzville, passing 5 signal lights and many at grade intersections along the way before finally entering the north part of Nanaimo. The lower highway standards and signal lights require a lower speed limit of 90 km/h (56 mph) on this section of highway. In Nanoose Bay the presence of a particularly busy signal light, multiple residential properties on the highway, a dense cluster of several intersecting side roads, and the lack of a centre divider results in a 60-kilometre-per-hour (37 mph) speed limit.

=== Nanaimo Parkway ===
At the Exit 29 signal lights, Highway 19A (Island Highway) once again diverges to follow the 1953 alignment. Highway 19 then veers south onto a 20-kilometre (12 mi) long, four-lane expressway known as the "Nanaimo Parkway" which opened in 1997. The alignment has five signalized intersections along its length along with 2 overpasses and 4 underpasses for local roads that do not connect to the highway. The only interchange on the Nanaimo Parkway is at its south terminus where a set of ramps bring Highway 19 onto the Highway 1 alignment where both roads continue south. The parkway's speed limit is 90 km/h (56 mph).

During the planning for the Nanaimo Parkway the Ministry of Transportation opted to construct signal lights instead of interchanges at 5 location as a cost saving measure intending on constructing the interchanges later when needed. At the time of its opening the parkway was a major improvement by allowing long distance traffic to bypass Nanaimo, greatly reducing driving times and eliminating congestion in the city. However, by 2021, the parkway itself was beginning to have serious congestion issues at the signal lights as a result of the highway being flooded with commuter traffic from a growing Nanaimo. With further growth in traffic expected over the next 30 years, the Ministry of Transportation has begun to study the implementation of interchanges on the parkway in the near future.

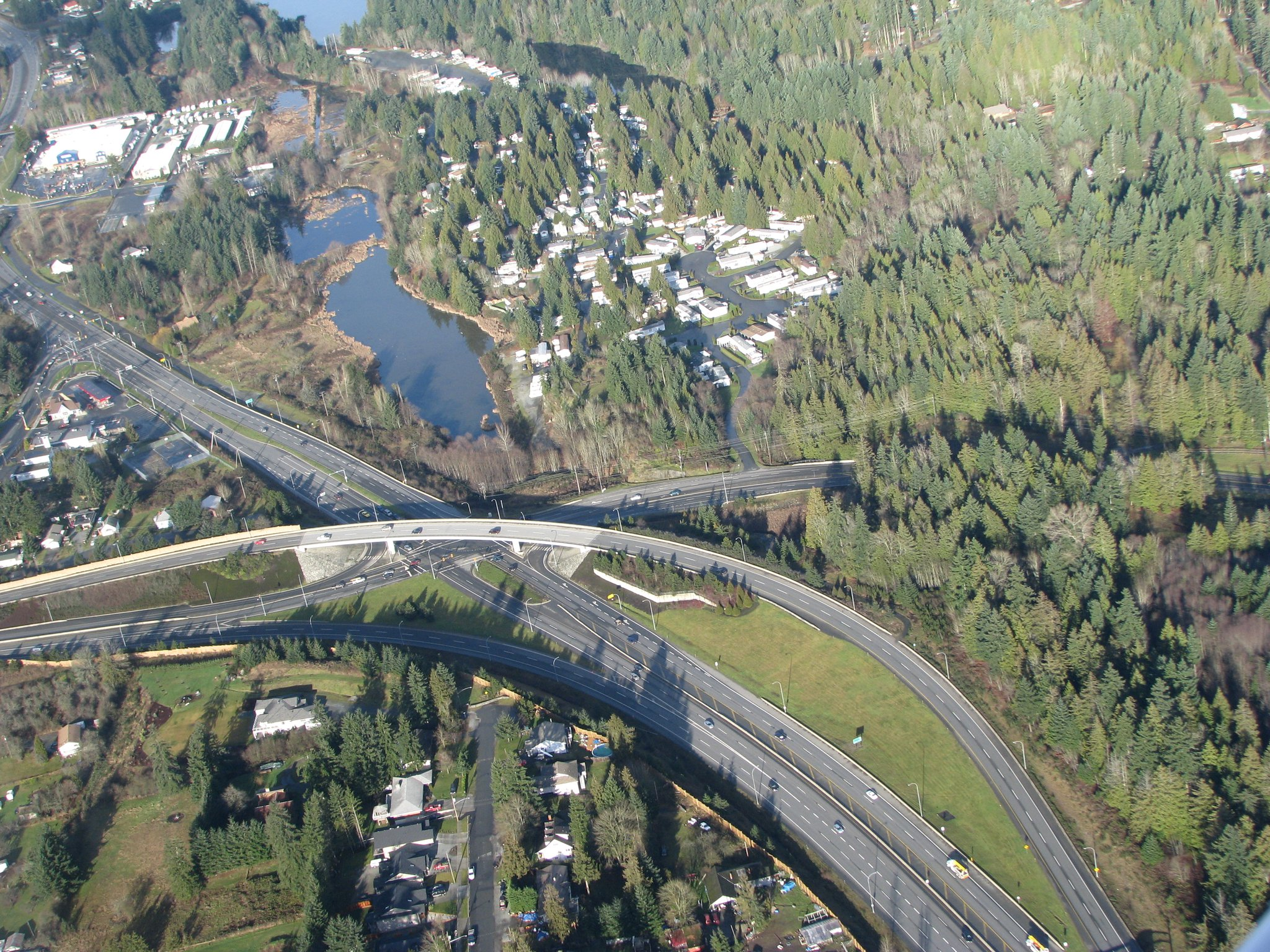
Ramp between Highway 1 and Highway 19 at the south end of the Nanaimo Parkway

=== Highway 1 Concurrency ===
After the interchange with Highway 1 and Cedar Road, Highway 19 runs in a short concurrency with Highway 1 (the Trans-Canada Highway) for 2 km (1¼ mi) before exiting at a trumpet interchange on to the Duke Point Highway. With 4 southbound lanes and 3 northbound lanes, this short section of freeway is the widest road on Vancouver Island.

=== Duke Point Highway ===
Opened in 1997, the 7.5-kilometre (4.7 mi) long Duke Point Highway begins as a 4 lane, undivided freeway. Highway 19 crosses over the Nanaimo River 2 km (1¼ mi) from Highway 1 and shortly afterwards passes through an interchange at Maughan Rd. The highway then turns northward and narrows to a undivided, 3 lane highway (2 lanes westbound and 1 lane eastbound) for the last 5 km (3.1 mi), passing two at grade intersections, and finally terminates at the Duke Point Ferry Terminal. There is heavy traffic on the highway for short intervals when ferries are unloading, but the rest of the time, the Nanaimo-bound lanes are virtually empty.

== History ==
Highway 19 was first paved and designated in 1953 as an early part of the W.A.C. Bennett administration's massive province-wide highway improvement program. The original highway was built mostly built along the same route that Highway 19A follows today and was mostly only 2 lanes wide. It originally only ran from Nanaimo to Campbell River, but has since seen two major extensions. The highway was initially extended north to Kelsey Bay to meet B.C. Ferries' service to Prince Rupert in 1965 with its official opening being on the 14 September. A sod turning ceremony had been held three years earlier in April 1962 and was officiated by Phil Gaglardi, the Highways Minister. The cost of the extension was $50 million (equivalent to 437.65 million in 2022)

By 1979, the highway was further extended north to Port Hardy, where it now terminates at the Bear Cove ferry terminal. It was officially opened on 21 September 1979 by highways minister Alex Fraser and premier Bill Bennett. With the extension completed, B.C. Ferries moved its southern terminus for the Prince Rupert run north to Port Hardy. Surveying for the extension had started 1970. with the project being fully complete by the summer of 1980. The project cost $65 million (equivalent to $247.89 million in 2022)

=== Vancouver Island Highway Project ===
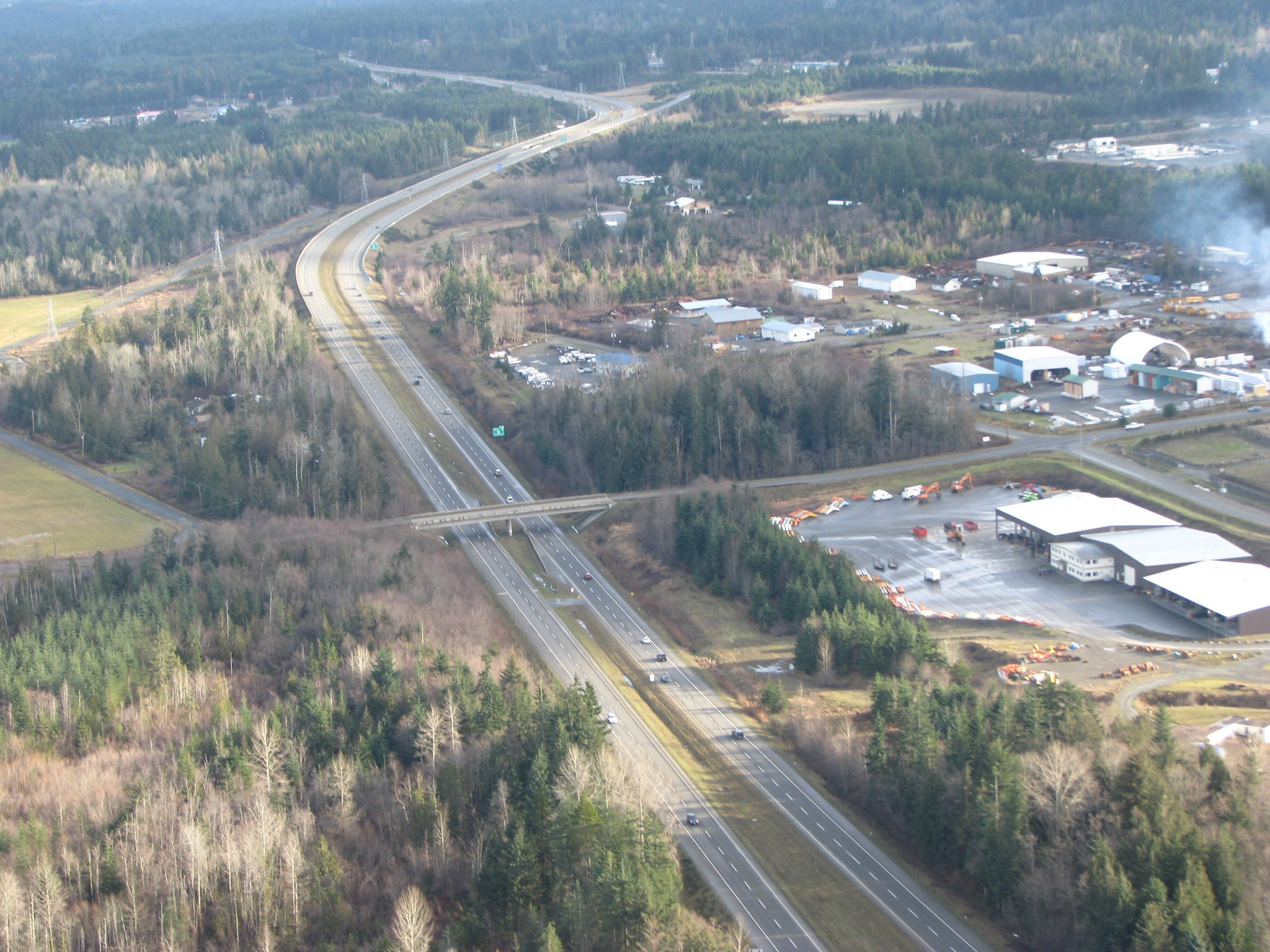
Opened in 1996, this section of the Inland Island Highway near Parksville was the first freeway segment for Central Vancouver Island

In the late 1990s and early 2000s, a highway building program called the Vancouver Island Highway Project was initiated to improve the Highway 1 and 19 corridors between Victoria and Campbell River. This project included the construction of the Inland Island Highway, the Nanaimo Parkway and the Duke Point Highway. By early 1996 work was well underway on all sections.

On October 5, 1996, the first segment of the Inland Island Highway from Mud Bay to Parksville was opened. The Highway 19 designation was soon applied to the new route with the original 1953 highway becoming Highway 19A.

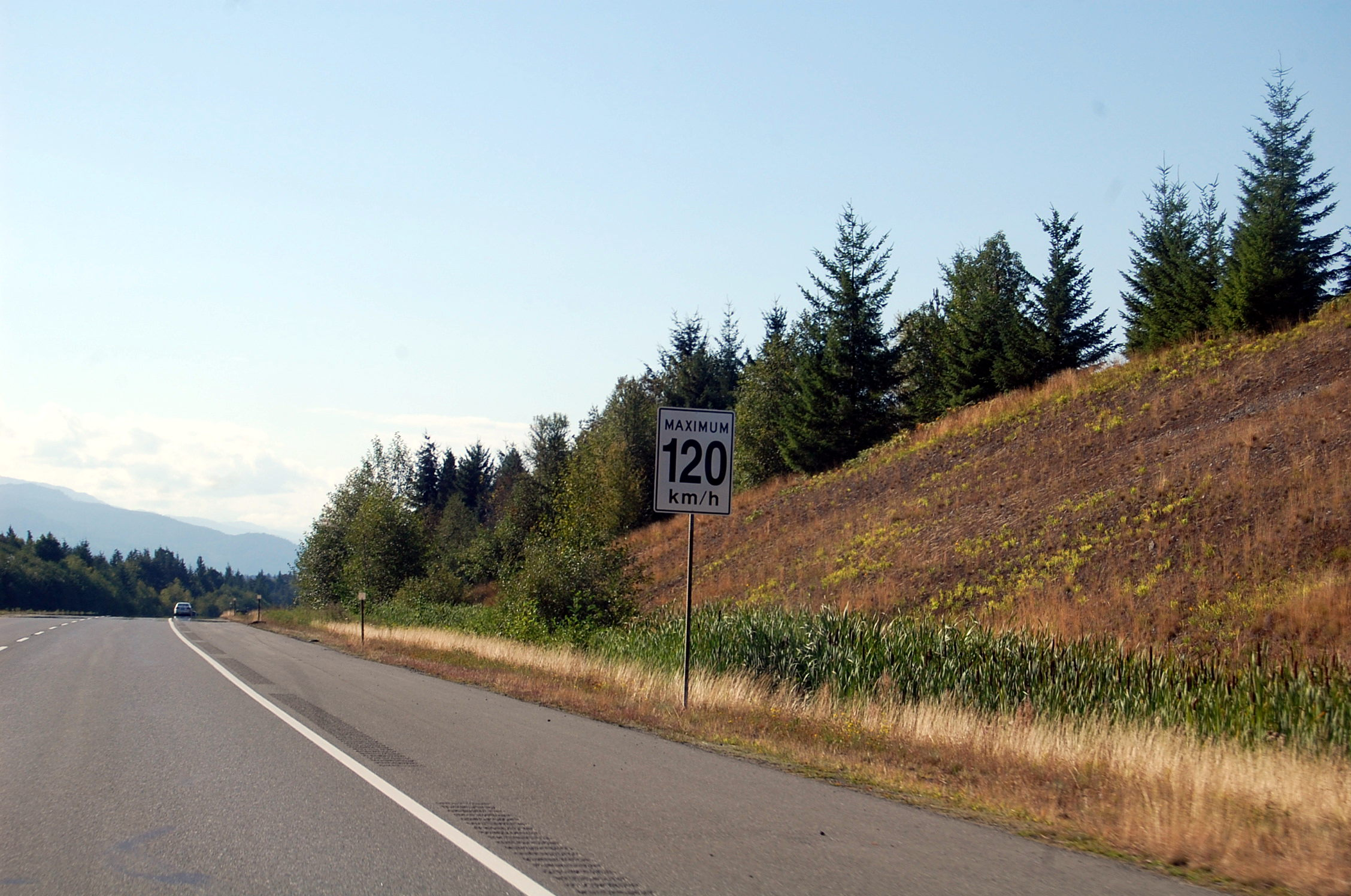
From 2014 to 2018, a stretch of Highway 19 north of Parksville had the highest signed speed limit in Canada, at 120 km/h (75 mph).

On May 31, 1997, the Nanaimo Parkway opened, cutting travel times for drivers going through Nanaimo from 40 minutes to 20 minutes and resulting in Highway 19 being realigned away from Nanaimo's downtown, the former route being replaced by another section of Highway 19A.

Opened in June 1997, the Duke Point Highway connected to BC Ferries' newest terminal as part of a scheme to remove congestion from the Departure Bay ferry terminal and the surrounding surface streets in Nanaimo's core. As a result of this project, Highway 19 was extended another 9 km to its present terminus, making it the only highway in British Columbia to have ferry terminals at both ends.

The remainder of the Inland Island Highway was built in phases over the next 4 years with the Campbell River Bypass opening on September 24, 1997; the Courtenay-Mud Bay link opening on September 25 1999; and the Courtenay-Campbell River expressway, opening on September 8, 2001, completing the project. No significant upgrades or extensions to Highway 19 have occurred since.

== Future ==
Due to the rapid growth of Nanaimo the southern sections of Highway 19 are expected to handle an increasing amount of traffic. The Nanaimo Parkway already experiences heavy congestion during peak hours and congestion is predicted to soon affect sections of Highway 19 north of Nanaimo as well due to dense development planned in Lantzville and the Nanoose Bay area. Congestion largely forms at signal lights as these sections of Highway 19 were not built as a freeway. To address these issues the BC Ministry of Transportation initiated the Nanaimo Parkway and Nanoose Bay Corridor Study. The study was completed in August 2021 and recommended interchanges be constructed to replace signal lights at Jingle Pot Road, Northfield Road and Mostar Road immediately while interchanges at Aulds Road, Highway 19A, Ware Road and Superior Road were recommended to be built within 20 years. A long term bypass and interchange in the Nanoose Bay Area was also proposed by the study.

== Major intersections ==
| Regional District | Location | km | mi | Exit | Destinations | Notes |
|---|---|---|---|---|---|---|
| Strait of Georgia | | | | | Highway 17 east – Vancouver | Continuation from Tsawwassen ferry terminal |
| Strait of Georgia | | | | BC Ferries from Duke Point to Tsawwassen | | |
| Nanaimo | Nanaimo | 0.00 | 0.00 | | Duke Point ferry terminal | Highway 19 southern terminus; south end of Duke Point Highway |
| Nanaimo | Nanaimo | 0.27 | 0.17 | (0) | Harmac Sawmill access | At grade, traffic signals; no westbound exit; south end of Duke Point Highway |
| Nanaimo | Nanaimo | 1.92 | 1.19 | (2) | Maughan Road – Biggs Park, Jack Point | At grade; no westbound entrance |
| Nanaimo | Cedar | 4.26 | 2.65 | (4) | Maughan Road – Duke Point Industrial Park | Interchange; eastbound exit, westbound entrance |
| Nanaimo | Nanaimo | 8.03 | 4.99 | 7 | Highway 1 (TCH) south – Victoria | Duke Point Interchange; south end of Highway 1 concurrency; north end of Duke Point Highway |
| Nanaimo | Nanaimo | 9.97 | 6.20 | 9 | Highway 1 (TCH) north / Cedar Road – Nanaimo City Centre, Departure Bay ferry terminal | Grade separated; left-side exit; north end of Highway 1 concurrency; south end of Nanaimo Parkway; BC Ferries to Vancouver (Horseshoe Bay) |
| Nanaimo | Nanaimo | 16.49 | 10.25 | 16 | College Drive / Fifth Street – Vancouver Island University | |
| Nanaimo | Nanaimo | 18.45 | 11.46 | 18 | Jingle Pot Road | |
| Nanaimo | Nanaimo | 21.34 | 13.26 | 21 | Northfield Road | |
| Nanaimo | Nanaimo | 24.55 | 15.25 | 24 | Jingle Pot Road / Mostar Road | |
| Nanaimo | Nanaimo | 28.17 | 17.50 | 28 | Aulds Road | |
| Nanaimo | Nanaimo | 28.60 | 17.77 | (28B) | Mary Ellen Drive | Northbound right-in/right-out; northbound access to Highway 19A |
| Nanaimo | Nanaimo | 29.11 | 18.09 | 29 | Highway 19A south (Island Highway) to Highway 1 (TCH) – Nanaimo Business Route, Departure Bay ferry terminal | Southbound only; jughandle intersection (signalized); north end of Nanaimo Parkway; BC Ferries to Vancouver (Horseshoe Bay) |
| Nanaimo | Lantzville | 30.56 | 18.99 | (30) | Ware Road | |
| Nanaimo | Lantzville | 32.38 | 20.12 | (32) | Superior Road | |
| Nanaimo | Lantzville | 33.96 | 21.10 | (34) | Lantzville Road | |
| Nanaimo | Nanoose Bay | 40.00 | 24.85 | (39) | Northwest Bay Road | |
| Nanaimo | Nanoose Bay | 40.33 | 25.06 | (40) | Morello Road | |
| Nanaimo | Nanoose Bay | 44.39 | 27.58 | (44) | Northwest Bay Logging Road | |
| Nanaimo | Parksville | 46.19 | 28.70 | 46 | Highway 19A north (Oceanside Route) | Craig's Crossing Interchange; south end of Inland Island Highway |
| Nanaimo | Parksville | 51.75 | 32.16 | 51 | Highway 4A west – Parksville, Coombs | Allsbrook Interchange |
| Nanaimo | Qualicum Beach | 60.71 | 37.72 | 60 | Highway 4 west – Qualicum Beach, Port Alberni | Hilliers Interchange |
| Nanaimo | | 75.15 | 46.70 | 75 | Horne Lake Road – Qualicum Bay, Bowser | |
| Comox Valley | | 87.25 | 54.21 | 87 | Cook Creek Road – Deep Bay, Fanny Bay | |
| Comox Valley | | 101.08 | 62.81 | 101 | Buckley Bay Road (Highway 902:2376 east) – Buckley Bay, Union Bay, Royston | Interchange; access to Denman Island–Hornby Island ferry |
| Comox Valley | Cumberland | 117.80 | 73.20 | 117 | Comox Valley Parkway (Highway 902:2331 east) – Cumberland, Courtenay, Comox, CFB Comox/Comox Airport, Ferries | Interchange; BC Ferries to Powell River; Highway 19 known as Ginger Goodwin Way through Cumberland |
| Comox Valley | | 127.27 | 79.08 | 127 | Piercy Road – Courtenay, Comox | |
| Comox Valley | | 130.88 | 81.33 | 130 | Dove Creek Road / Strathcona Parkway | To Mount Washington |
| Comox Valley | | 144.10 | 89.54 | 144 | Hamm Road – Black Creek | |
| Strathcona | | 153.76 | 95.54 | (153) | Cranberry Lane | |
| Strathcona | Campbell River | 161.36 | 100.26 | 161 | Jubilee Parkway (Highway 902:2364 east) – Campbell River Airport | |
| Strathcona | Campbell River | 167.96 | 104.37 | 167 | Willis Road | |
| Strathcona | Campbell River | 170.43 | 105.90 | (169) | Highway 28 west / Highway 19A south (Oceanside Route) – Gold River, City Centre, Quadra Island | North end of Inland Island Highway; south end of Island Highway |
| Strathcona | | 234.24 | 145.55 | | Sayward Road (Highway 902:2387 north) – Sayward | |
| Mount Waddington | | 355.83 | 221.10 | | Beaver Cove Road (Highway 902:2391 east) – Telegraph Cove | |
| Mount Waddington | Port McNeill | 363.08 | 225.61 | | Highway 902:2377 north – Alert Bay, Sointula | |
| Mount Waddington | | 382.69 | 237.79 | | Highway 30 west – Port Alice | |
| Mount Waddington | Port Hardy | 398.98 | 247.91 | | Douglas Street (Highway 902:2398 north) – Port Hardy | Unofficial alternate route of Highway 19; south end of Bear Cove Highway segment |
| Mount Waddington | Port Hardy | 403.63 | 250.80 | | Bear Cove Ferry Terminal | North end of Bear Cove Highway; Highway 19 northern terminus |
| Inside Passage | | | | BC Ferries to Central Coast and Prince Rupert | | |
1.000 mi = 1.609 km; 1.000 km = 0.621 mi: Concurrency terminus; Incomplete access; Tolled; Route transition; () - Exit not officially numbered
