= Comox Valley =

Region of Vancouver Island, British Columbia, Canada

- Valley
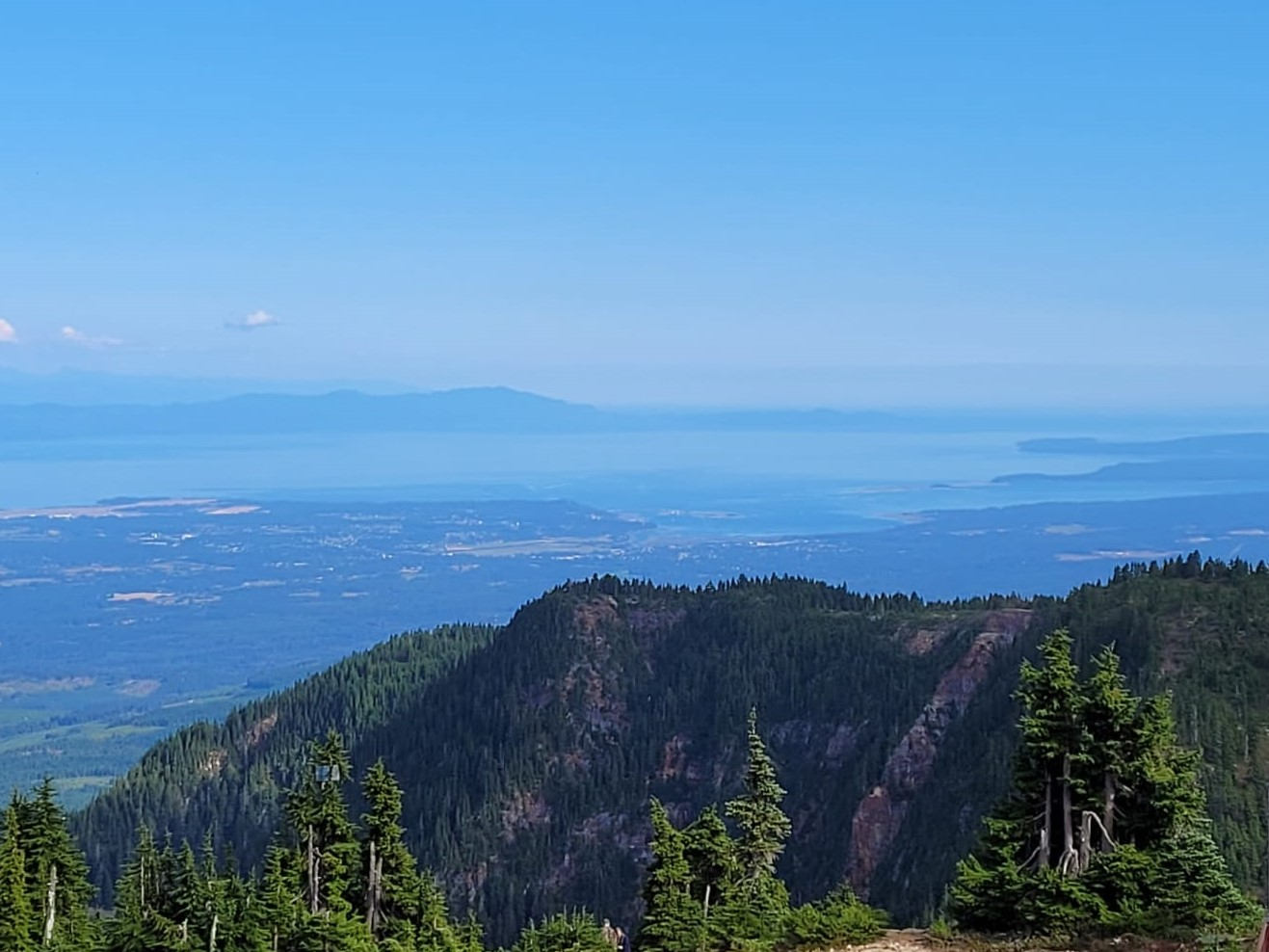
- A view of Comox Valley and Harbour from Mount Washington, with Strait of Georgia and Texada Island in the background

- Location within British Columbia
- Coordinates: 49°40′47″N 124°58′10″W
- Location: Vancouver Island, British Columbia, Canada

The Comox Valley is a region on the east coast of Vancouver Island, British Columbia, Canada, that includes the city of Courtenay, the town of Comox, the village of Cumberland, and the unincorporated settlements of Royston, Union Bay, Fanny Bay, Black Creek, and Merville. The communities of Denman Island and Hornby Island are also considered part of the Comox Valley. The Comox Valley contains the 47th largest metropolitan area in Canada with a population of about 76,000 as of 2022.

== Geography ==
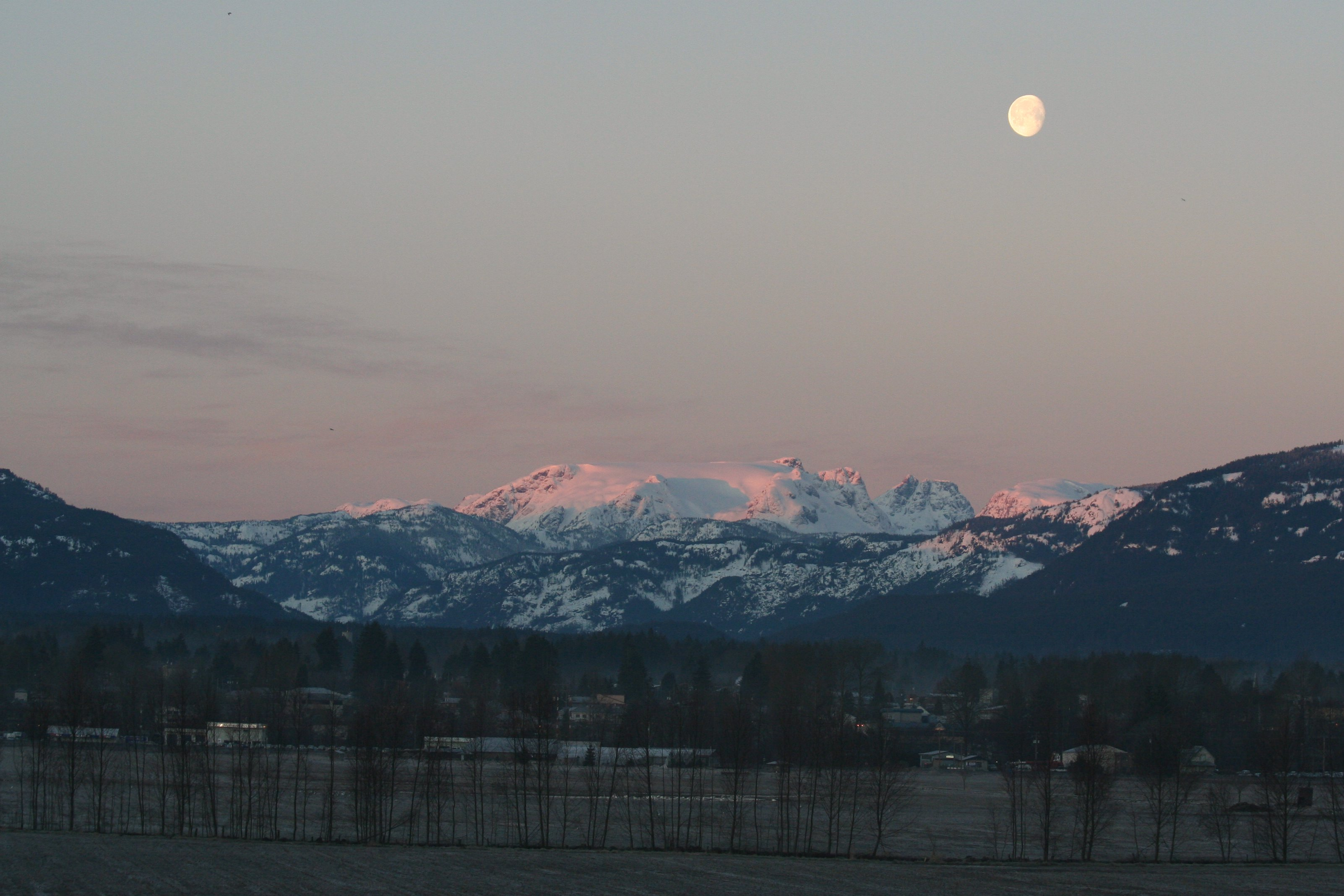
Comox Glacier

The Comox Valley is a lowland area with deep alluvial soil. There are mountains to the west, and the Comox Glacier overlooks the valley, On the east, beaches stretch along the shore of the Strait of Georgia.

== History ==
Three groups are Indigenous to the valley: the Comox, the Pentlatch, and the Lekwiltok. They farmed in the rich soil there, keeping the land cleared through burning.

According to researcher Samuel Bawlf, Sir Francis Drake visited this area in 1579. This assertion is written about in The Secret Voyage of Sir Francis Drake, 1577–1580 and suggests that Drake's reference to landing in what he called New Albion (the name of the region of North America explored by Drake) was, in fact, what is now known as Comox. This conclusion is not shared, however, by other historians such as Jules Verne and Samuel Johnson. According to the Canadian Encyclopedia, first contact in Comox between the original First Nations inhabitants and the first European visitors occurred in 1792 when HMS Discovery anchored in Comox Harbour.

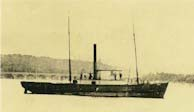
The Grappler

The first European settlers arrived in the spring of 1861, intending to start farms. At that time, Governor James Douglas was encouraging settlers arriving in the Colony of Vancouver Island to establish themselves in the Cowichan Valley and the Comox Valley rather than the gold fields of the mainland as these were the two areas that had agricultural potential on the island. The first settlers were Nanaimo coal miners and Hudson's Bay Company employees, John and William Biggs, Thomas Dignan, Edwin Gough, Adam Grant Horne, Thomas Jones, Alexander McFarlane, George Mitchell, Thomas Williams, and Charles York all of whom had arrived on Vancouver Island before the 1858 gold rush. Of these, only Mitchell remained by 1862 when the Grappler arrived with the Comox Expedition. Dignan went to Gabriola Island. Horne and most of the others went to Nanaimo. A small pox epidemic in 1862 decimated the native population.

In 1862, Surveyor General Pemberton secured funding from the colonial government in Victoria to construct the first road into the Comox area from Nanaimo. When it became clear that a 15-foot (4.6 m) wide wagon road would be too expensive, a bridle path with some bridges was built instead. Flooding and tree falls made maintenance of this road impossible. Until the mid-1890s, access to the area was only by sea. In 1874 the 1,015-foot (309 m) government wharf and the first bridge over the Courtenay River were constructed.

The area became the centre of one of the British Empire's largest private railway concerns, the Comox Logging & Railway Company. It was also the headquarters of Comox Logging, which owned Block 29, a valuable stand of Douglas Fir timber, stretching from south of Courtenay well to the north of Campbell River. For a number of years, logging was the largest source of employment in the community. Logging and mining declined in the 1960s, and fishing later declined in the 1990s. At that time the region was one of the fastest growing in British Columbia, although the growth rate between 2001 and 2006 has averaged just 2.0% annually. Most workers in the logging industry commuted to camps and logging operations further north on the Island or the mainland Coast; the Field lumber mill in Courtenay was disassembled in the fall of 2006.

== Economy ==
Since 2008, the area has been in the Comox Valley Regional District. The growth industries in the Comox Valley in recent years are tourism and construction. A ski resort at nearby Mount Washington brings in tourists. The Canadian Forces in the form of CFB Comox contributes to the local economy as well. The service sector accounts for over 50% of employment. The lumber resources of Comox Logging are now owned by TimberWest and are being cut for the second time. The remaining forest resources in Comox Valley are scattered amongst small woodlots on individual farms, or in isolated parks.

== Transportation ==
Two main highways, a ferry terminal and a commercial, a civilian and a military airport, and are the main transportation routes in and around the Comox Valley. The Southern Railway of Vancouver Island (formally known as the Esquimalt and Nanaimo Railway (E&N Railway)) operates a freight railway line with its northern terminus at Courtenay. Passenger service on the railway was suspended in 2011.

Highway 19A was the original north-south highway through the valley. For much of its route, it closely follows the shore and connects most of the communities. Highway 19 is farther inland, a faster route that bypasses the populated areas.

Comox Valley Airport/CFB Comox is the main airport for the area. Courtenay Airpark, Courtenay Airpark Water Aerodrome and Smit Field are available for smaller aircraft. Regular air services primarily connect to Vancouver, along with service to destinations like Calgary and Edmonton.

BC Ferries operates a terminal at Little River where it provides service to the Westview ferry terminal in Powell River and Blubber Bay on Texada Island.

== Culture ==
In 2007 the area was designated one of Canada's "Cultural Capitals" by Canadian Heritage. A number of music and arts events are undertaken in the region. The community also has a number of volunteer and non-profit organizations devoted to cultural pursuits.

The Valley is known as "The Valley of Festivals". Events include the Art & Bloom Festival, North Island Hot Jazz Festival, Comox Valley Shellfish Festival, About Town!, Marina Park Main Event, CYMC Summer School & Festival, Vancouver Island MusicFest, Hornby Island Festival, Filberg Festival, Comox Nautical Days, Showcase Festival, Comox Valley Exhibition Fall Fair, and Cumberland Wild.
