= British Columbia Highway 19A =

Highway on Vancouver Island in British Columbia

Highway 19A
- Old Island Highway; Oceanside Route

Route information
- Maintained by the Ministry of Transportation and Infrastructure
- Existed: 1953–present

Nanaimo section
- Length: 10.64 km (6.61 mi)
- South end: Highway 1 (TCH) in Nanaimo
- North end: Highway 19 in Nanaimo

Oceanside section
- Length: 136.89 km (85.06 mi)
- South end: Highway 19 at Craig's Crossing
- Major intersections: Highway 4A in Parksville; Highway 4 in Qualicum Beach
- North end: Highway 19 / Highway 28 in Campbell River

Location
- Country: Canada
- Province: British Columbia
- Regional districts: Nanaimo, Comox Valley, Strathcona
- Major cities: Nanaimo, Parksville, Courtenay, Campbell River

Highway system
- British Columbia provincial highways
← Highway 19	→ Highway 20

Highway 19A, known locally as the Oceanside Route or the Old Island Highway, is a provincial highway in British Columbia, Canada. It runs along two former sections of Highway 19 on Vancouver Island, within Nanaimo and between Craig's Crossing and Campbell River. The section of Highway 19A between Craig's Crossing and Campbell River is 136.89 km (85.06 mi) long, and the Nanaimo alignment covers 10.64 km (6.61 mi). The highway was established after Highway 19 was realigned to a new road between 1996 and 2001.

== Route description ==
=== Nanaimo ===
Highway 19A's Nanaimo alignment begins at Stewart Avenue (Trans-Canada Highway / Highway 1) at the entrance to the Departure Bay ferry terminal and proceeds up Brechin Road to Terminal Avenue. The highway then turns north and proceeds through the northern business district of the city to northern end of the Nanaimo Parkway (Highway 19).

Terminal Avenue between Stewart Avenue and Brechin Road is signed as an alternate connection between Highways 1 and 19A and a bypass of the Departure Bay ferry terminal.

=== Oceanside section ===
Highway 19A's northern alignment begins at the junction of Highway 19 at Craig's Crossing and hugs the coastline for 14 km (8.7 mi) through Parksville and the town of Qualicum Beach. The highway continues northwest for 37 km (23 mi) through the settlements Bowser, Deep Bay, and Fanny Bay before it meets a junction with Highway 19 at the Buckley Bay B.C. Ferry terminal.

From Buckley Bay, Highway 19A once again hugs the coastline as it proceeds northwest through the hamlets of Union Bay and Royston for 20 km (12 mi) before entering the city of Courtenay. Highway 19A proceeds through the southern part of the city of Courtenay on Cliffe Avenue, then crosses the Courtenay River on one of only two road drawbridges on Vancouver Island (also known as the 17th street bridge), intersects with the main road into Comox, and travels along a bypass around the city centre. Highway 19A then intersects Ryan Road, which provides access to the Comox ferry terminal in Little River and CFB Comox, and leaves Courtenay at the intersection with Headquarters Road. This stretch of highway 19A through the main city of Courtenay is heavily congested. The highway continues inland for 26 km (16 mi), through the communities of Grantham, Merville, Black Creek, and Oyster River before rejoining the coastline at the intersection with Oyster Garden Road. From there, the highway hugs the coastline for 18 km (11 mi), entering the city of Campbell River, passing by the B.C. Ferry terminal at Discovery Pier, and going north and west around the City Centre before terminating at the junction of Highways 19 and 28.

== Major intersections ==
Regional District	Location	km	mi	Destinations	Notes
Nanaimo	Nanaimo	0.00	0.00	Stewart Avenue (Highway 1) / Zorkin Road – Departure Bay ferry terminal, Vancouver, Victoria	BC Ferries to Horseshoe Bay; continues in Zorkin Road; Highway 19A follows Brechin Road
Nanaimo	Nanaimo	0.99	0.62	Terminal Avenue south to Highway 1 – Nanaimo City Centre, Victoria	Highway 19A branches onto Terminal Avenue; unofficial alternate route of Highway 19A
Nanaimo	Nanaimo	10.64	6.61	Highway 19 north – Campbell River	Jughandle intersection; northbound entrance and southbound exit
17.08 km (10.61 mi) gap
Nanaimo	Parksville	27.72	17.22	Highway 19 – Nanaimo, Port Alberni, Campbell River	Craig's Crossing Interchange; south end of Oceanside Route
Nanaimo	Parksville	33.10	20.57	Alberni Highway	Original Highway 4 alignment
Nanaimo	Parksville	33.36	20.73	McMillan Street west to Highway 4A – Port Alberni, Tofino	
Nanaimo	Qualicum Beach	43.86	27.25	Memorial Avenue to Highway 4 west – Qualicum Beach Town Centre, Port Alberni	
Comox Valley	Buckley Bay	69.90	43.43	Buckley Bay Road (Highway 902:2376) to Highway 19 – Denman Island, Hornby Island	
Comox Valley	Royston	99.49	61.82	Royston Road (Highway 902:2336 west) – Cumberland, Comox Lake	No access to Highway 19
Comox Valley	Courtenay	103.44	64.27	Comox Valley Parkway (Highway 902:2331 west) to Highway 19 – Cumberland	
Comox Valley	Courtenay	105.83	65.76	Comox Road – Comox	
Comox Valley	Courtenay	106.95	66.46	Ryan Road – Comox ferry terminal, CFB Comox	BC Ferries to Powell River
Strathcona	Campbell River	141.33	87.82	Jubilee Parkway (Highway 902:2364 west) to Highway 19 – Campbell River Airport	
Strathcona	Campbell River	153.83– 153.97	95.59– 95.67	Highway 19 (Tamarac Street / Willow Street) – Port Hardy, Nanaimo Highway 28 west (Campbell River Road) – Gold River	North end of Oceanside Route; continues as Highway 28
1.000 mi = 1.609 km; 1.000 km = 0.621 mi: Incomplete access
