= British Columbia Highway 4 =

Highway on Vancouver Island in British Columbia

Highway 4
- Alberni Highway; Pacific Rim Highway
- Highway 4 highlighted in red.

Route information
- Maintained by the Ministry of Transportation and Infrastructure
- Length: 162 km (101 mi)

Major junctions
- East end: Highway 19 in Qualicum Beach
- Highway 4A near Coombs
- West end: Government Wharf in Tofino

Location
- Country: Canada
- Province: British Columbia
- Regional districts: Nanaimo, Alberni-Clayoquot
- Major cities: Port Alberni
- Towns: Qualicum Beach

Highway system
- British Columbia provincial highways
← Highway 3	→ Highway 5

Highway 4 is the longest east–west main vehicle route on Vancouver Island, British Columbia, Canada, with a total length of 162 kilometres (101 mi). It is known locally as the Alberni Highway to the east of Port Alberni and the Pacific Rim Highway to the west. The original highway from Parksville to Alberni and Port Alberni was completed in 1942 and was originally designated as Highway 1A. It was re-designated as Highway 4 in 1953, and was extended in 1961 to the district of Tofino, on the west coast of the Island.

== Route details ==
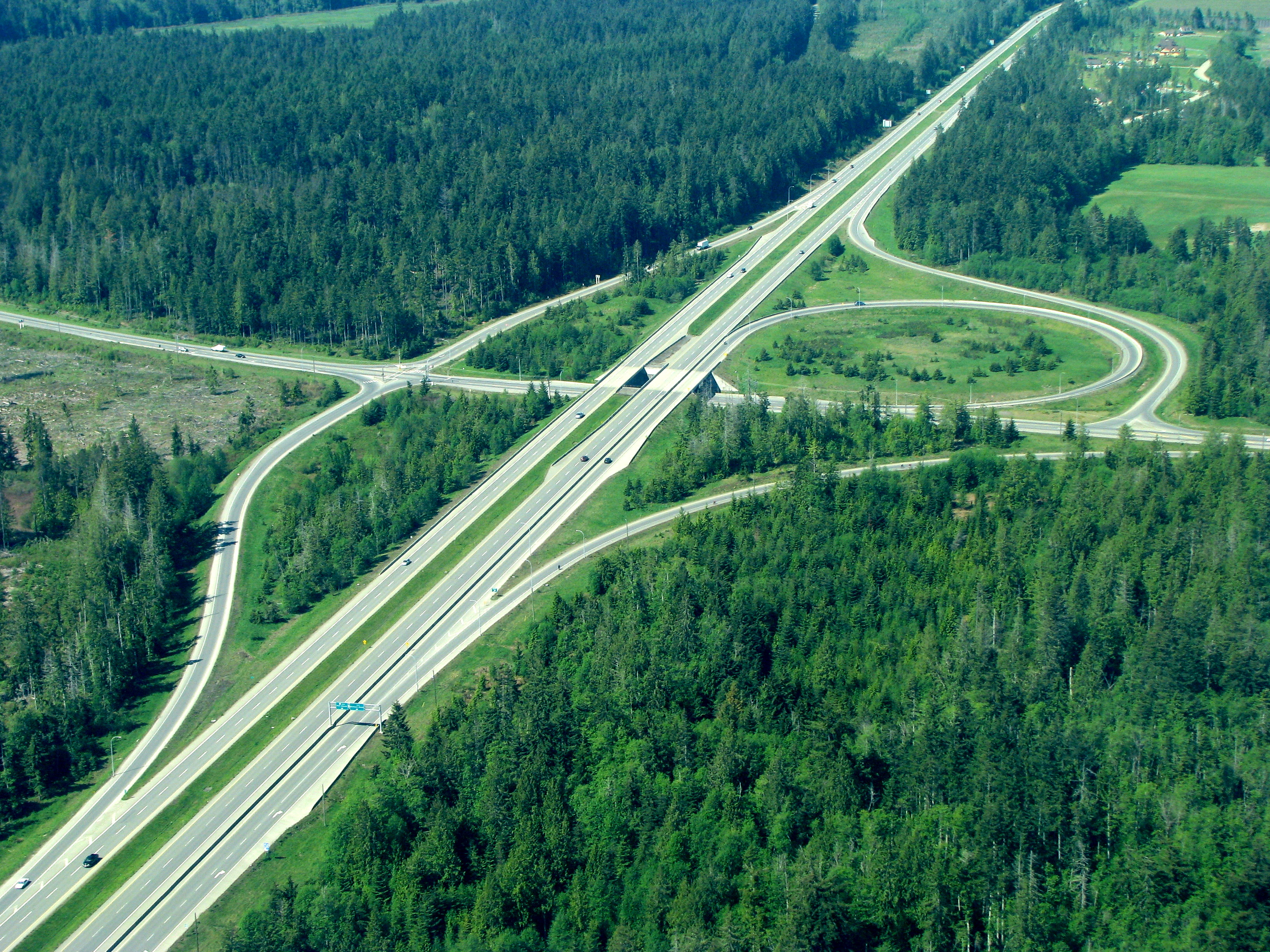
Highway 4 and 19 Interchange at Qualicum Beach

Highway 4's eastern terminus is at the interchange with Highway 19 at Qualicum Beach; however, the roadway continues north as Memorial Avenue for 4 kilometres (2.5 mi) to Highway 19A. From Highway 19, it travels south for 3 kilometres (1.9 mi) to a junction with an older Alberni Highway segment, now known as Highway 4A, at the small community of Hilliers in Coombs. Highway 4 veers directly west upon meeting this junction.

The majority of Highway 4's length is composed of a two-lane configuration. An inactive subdivision of the E&N Railway parallels Highway 4 all the way from the coast near Parksville to the city of Port Alberni.

West of Coombs Junction, Highway 4 travels for 11 kilometres (6.8 mi) before meeting Cameron Lake. Highway 4 hugs the shore of Cameron Lake for 5 kilometres (3.1 mi), then winds its way through MacMillan Provincial Park, which includes a tourist attraction known as Cathedral Grove. After Cameron Lake, Highway 4 climbs for 8 kilometres (5.0 mi), following the Cameron River, to the Port Alberni Summit—the highest point on the highway (elevation: 411 metres or 1,348 feet), known by locals as "The Hump", at which it crosses from the Regional District of Nanaimo into the Alberni-Clayoquot Regional District—and then descends for 6 kilometres (3.7 mi) to a spur that travels into the city centre of Port Alberni. Highway 4 enters the city limits of Port Alberni 2 kilometres (1.2 mi) west of the main spur into the city, and 5 kilometres (3.1 mi) later, exits Port Alberni via a bridge over the Somass River.

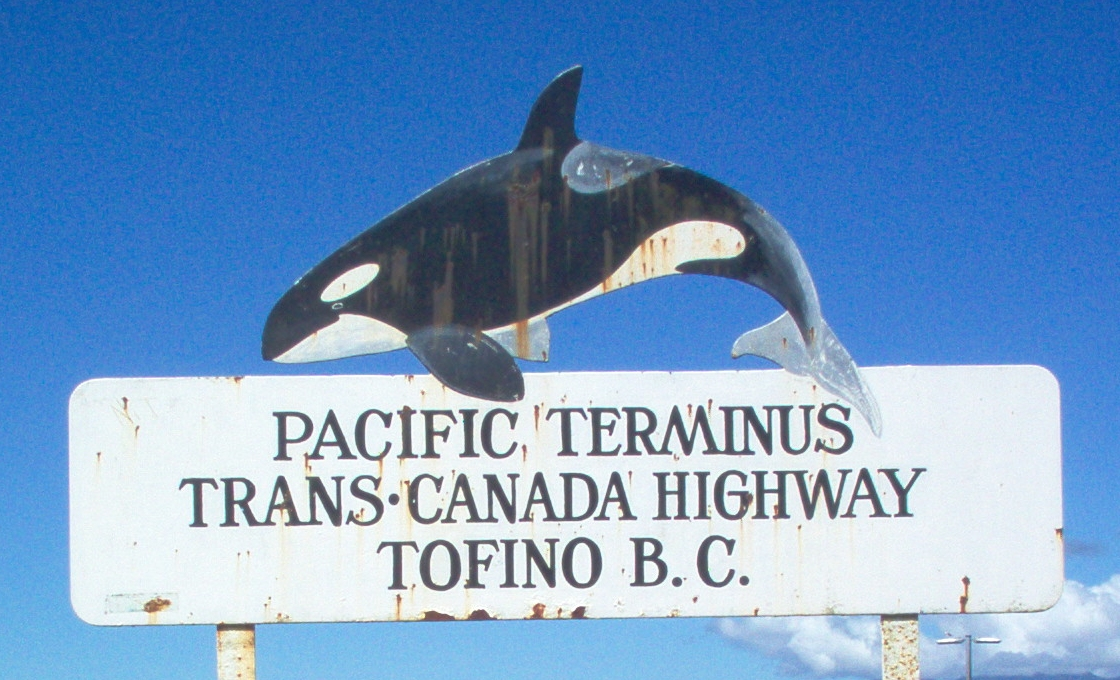
Tofino was a strong advocate of the Trans-Canada Highway system, and this sign was erected in the hope that Highway 4 would become part of the TCH.

6 kilometres (3.7 mi) west of the Somass River crossing, Highway 4 reaches the shore of Sproat Lake, following the lake shore west for 24 kilometres (15 mi). Highway 4 then follows the Taylor River for ten kilometres (6.2 mi) to the summit of Sutton Pass (elevation: 240 metres (790 ft)), named after William John Sutton, and then turns toward the south-southwest to follow the Kennedy River. This winding bearing of Highway 4, which features very steep grades, continues for 23 kilometres (14 mi) before reaching the southeast shore of Kennedy Lake. Highway 4 then follows the shore of Kennedy Lake southwest for nineteen kilometres (12 mi), and reaches a junction with a spur into the district municipality of Ucluelet (known locally as "The Junction") five kilometres (3.1 mi) later, after which the route continues in a northwest direction. After one kilometre (0.62 mi), Highway 4 enters the Long Beach Unit of Pacific Rim National Park Reserve. Highway 4 goes through the national park for 22 kilometres (14 mi) northwest before terminating 11 kilometres (6.8 mi) later at Tofino.

== Major intersections ==
From east to west:

Regional District	Location	km	mi	Destinations	Notes
Nanaimo	Qualicum Beach	−3.70	−2.30	Highway 19A (Oceanside Route) – Courtenay, Parksville	
Nanaimo	Qualicum Beach	0.00	0.00	Highway 19 (Inland Island Highway) – Campbell River, Nanaimo	Hilliers Interchange (Highway 19 exit 60); Highway 4 eastern terminus
Nanaimo	Coombs	2.62	1.63	Highway 4A east – Coombs, Parksville	
Alberni-Clayoquot	Port Alberni	37.74	23.45	Gertrude Street – City Centre	
Alberni-Clayoquot		128.72	79.98	Ucluelet Road (Highway 902:2388 south) – Ucluelet	
Alberni-Clayoquot		131.14– 151.43	81.49– 94.09	Passes through Pacific Rim National Park Reserve	
Alberni-Clayoquot	Tofino	161.60	100.41	Government Wharf	Highway 4 western terminus
1.000 mi = 1.609 km; 1.000 km = 0.621 mi: Closed/former

== Highway 4A ==
Highway 4A
- Location: Coombs–Parksville
- Length: 9.7 km (6.0 mi)

Highway 4A is the previous alignment of Highway 4 east of Coombs. The '4A' designation was originally assigned in 1968 to the current section of Highway 4 between Coombs and Qualicum Beach. The 4 and 4A alignments east and north of Coombs, respectively, switched designations when the Parksville to Mud Bay section of the Inland Island Highway was completed in 1996. This older spur of Highway 4 terminates in the east at Parksville, 10 kilometres (6 mi) from Coombs.

=== Major intersections ===
The entire route is in Nanaimo Regional District.

Location	km	mi	Destinations	Notes
Parksville	−1.90	−1.18	Highway 19A (Oceanside Route) – Qualicum Beach, Nanaimo	
Parksville	0.00	0.00	Highway 19 (Inland Island Highway) – Campbell River, Nanaimo	Allsbrook Interchange (Highway 19 exit 51); Highway 4A eastern terminus
Coombs	9.67	6.01	Highway 4 – Qualicum Beach, Port Alberni	Highway 4A western terminus
1.000 mi = 1.609 km; 1.000 km = 0.621 mi: Closed/former
