= Island Highway =

Highway on Vancouver Island in British Columbia

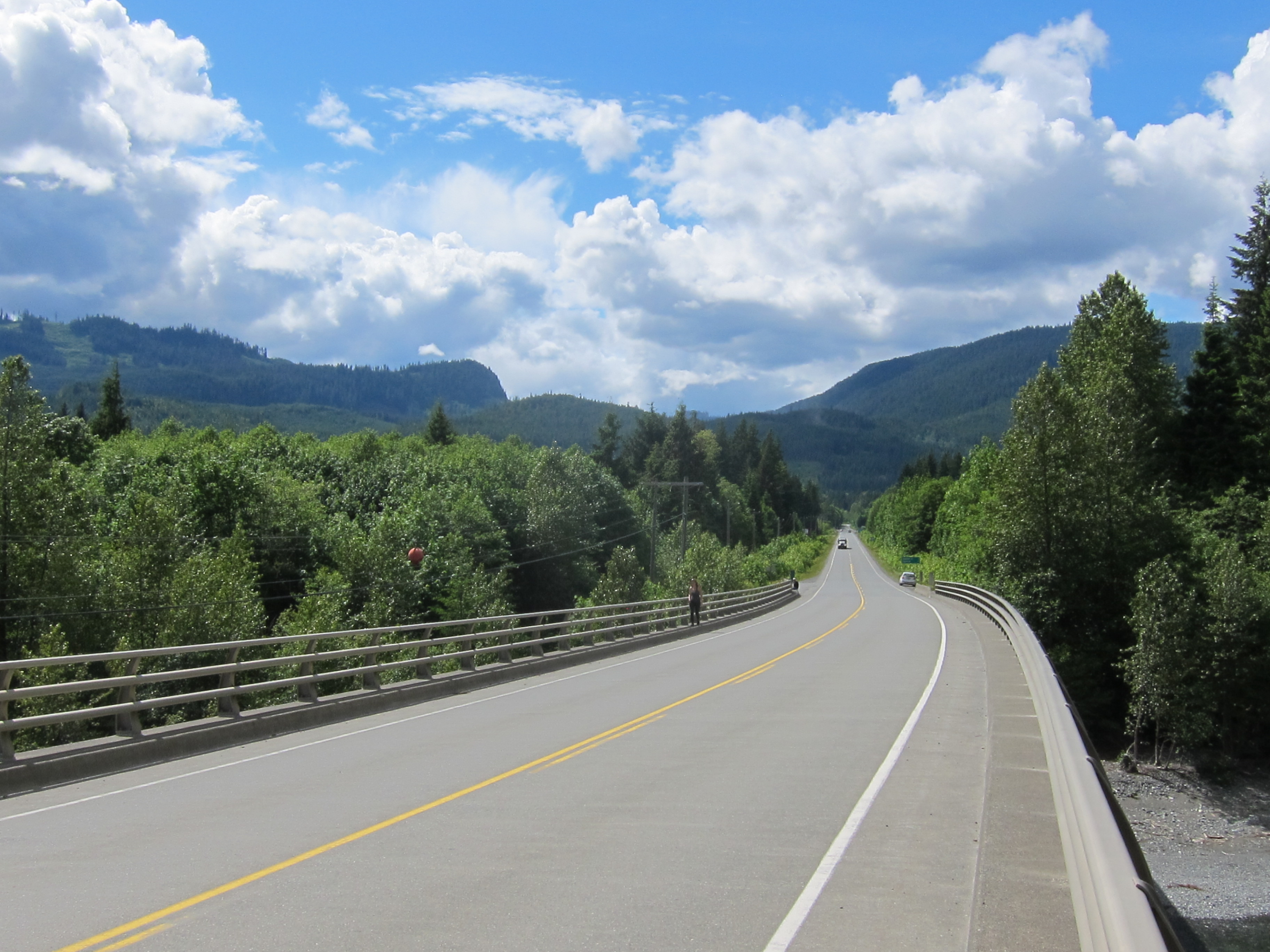
The Island Highway in the Sayward Valley

The Island Highway is a series of highways that follows much of the eastern coastline of Vancouver Island, British Columbia, Canada.

While the Island Highway has no officially designated starting point, it is understood to begin at the BC Ferries dock in Port Hardy as Highway 19. The highway continues southbound as Highway 19 until it reaches the northern end of Campbell River, at the intersection of Highway 19 and Highway 19A. At this point, Highway 19A becomes the Island Highway, and runs south through Courtenay, Union Bay, Fanny Bay, and Qualicum Beach until it reaches Parksville (this section of the highway is often referred to as the Oceanside Route).

At the southern tip of Parksville, the Island Highway rejoins Highway 19 and continues south to Nanaimo, where it meets Highway 1, the Trans-Canada Highway. The highway continues through Ladysmith, Duncan, and several other communities before winding through the higher elevation Malahat district.

Although the Trans-Canada Highway remains the Island Highway south to Victoria, the name is rarely applied to it there. Instead and confusingly, "Island Highway" is the name still given to Highway 1A from Goldstream Avenue through Langford and Colwood to Six Mile Road in View Royal, after which the road is briefly named "Old Island Highway" for a few blocks, where the address numbering scheme changes from the 1600s to the 400s, resulting in adjacent businesses have substantially different addresses. The road then continues as "Island Highway" through to Admirals Road. Additionally, mapping tools such as Google Maps show both Highway 1 and Highway 1A as being "Island Highway" through this section.
