= British Columbia Highway 30 =

Highway on Vancouver Island in British Columbia

Highway 30
- Port Alice Road

Route information
- Maintained by the Ministry of Transportation and Infrastructure
- Length: 37 km (23 mi)

Major junctions
- Northeast end: Highway 19 between Port Hardy and Port McNeill
- Southwest end: Port Alice

Location
- Country: Canada
- Province: British Columbia

Highway system
- British Columbia provincial highways
← Highway 29	→ Highway 31

Highway 30, also known as Port Alice Road, is a 30 km (19 mi) long northeast-to-southwest scenic route in the Regional District of Mount Waddington on Vancouver Island, connecting Port Alice with a location on Highway 19 known as Keogh, between Port Hardy and Port McNeill. Located halfway between the Junction with Highway 19 and Port Alice lies Marble River Provincial Park. As recently as 2008, the provincial government provided funds to have the entire highway resurfaced at a cost estimated around $1.3 million.

== Major intersections ==
From northeast to southwest. The entire route is in Mount Waddington Regional District.

Location	km	mi	Destinations	Notes
	0.00	0.00	Highway 19 – Port Hardy, Beaver Cove, Port McNeill	Northeastern terminus
Port Alice	36.59	22.74	Neucel Specialty Cellulose main entrance	Southwestern terminus; road continues as Marine Drive
1.000 mi = 1.609 km; 1.000 km = 0.621 mi
