= CVRD =

CVRD may refer to:

- Vale (mining company), formerly Companhia Vale do Rio Doce
- Comox Valley Regional District, a regional government in British Columbia, Canada
- Cowichan Valley Regional District, a regional government in British Columbia, Canada
