= Speed limits in Canada =

Canadian speed limits are set by different levels of government (federal, provincial, and municipal), depending on the jurisdiction under which the road falls, resulting in differences from province to province. The limits have been posted in kilometres per hour (km/h) since September 1, 1977. Before then, when Canada used Imperial units, speed limits were in miles per hour (mph).

== Statutory speed limits ==
Statutory speed limits are default speed limits set by statute in each province or territory. They apply on roads which do not have posted speed limits.

In most provinces and territories, statutory speed limits are 50 km/h (31 mph) in urban areas, 80 km/h (50 mph) in rural areas. There is no statutory speed limit for grade-separated freeways; however the typical speed limit in most provinces is 100 km/h (62 mph) or 110 km/h (68 mph). Statutory speed limits for school zones tend to be 30 or 40 km/h (19 or 25 mph) in urban areas and 50 km/h (31 mph) in rural areas.

"N/A" means there is no such roadway in the province or territory. This table contains the statutory maximum speed limits, in kilometres per hour, on roads in each category.

Province/territory	Rural	Urban
Alberta	100 km/h on provincial highways. 80 km/h on all other roads	50 km/h
British Columbia	80 km/h	50 km/h
Manitoba	90 km/h	50 km/h
New Brunswick	80 km/h	50 km/h
Newfoundland and Labrador	100 km/h on Trans Canada Highway. 80 km/h on other paved roads. 60 km/h on unpaved roads	50 km/h
Northwest Territories	90 km/h	50 km/h
Nova Scotia	80 km/h	50 km/h
Nunavut	90 km/h	50 km/h
Ontario	80 km/h	50 km/h
Prince Edward Island	100 km/h during daytime. 90 km/h during night. 80 km/h on unpaved roads	50 km/h in urban districts. 60 km/h in business districts
Quebec	100 km/h on controlled access highways. 90 km/h on paved roads. 70 km/h on unpaved roads	50 km/h
Saskatchewan	80 km/h	Discretion of municipality
Yukon	Discretion of road authority	50 km/h

== Posted speed limits ==
Posted speed limits may differ significantly from the statutory speed limit. For example, in Alberta, Highway 1A has a statutory maximum speed limit of 100 km/h but a posted speed limit of 30 km/h near 51.169832°N 115.658684°W.

The highest speed limits in Canada are found on British Columbia's Coquihalla Highway with a speed limit of 120 km/h (75 mph) and on a 44 km (27 mi) stretch on Alberta Highway 2 south of Leduc. Formerly, British Columbia's Okanagan Connector and Highway 19 also possessed 120 km/h limits, but were reduced to 110 km/h in 2018.

This table contains typical daytime speed limits, in kilometres per hour, on typical roads in each category. The values shown are not necessarily the fastest or slowest posted limit.

Province/Territory	Freeway (rural)	Freeway (urban)	Divided Highway (rural)	Undivided (rural)	Urban
Alberta	90–120	50–110	80–110	60–100	50
British Columbia	100–120	60–100	80–110	60–100	50
Manitoba	N/A	100	100–110	100	50
New Brunswick	110	100–110	110	80–100	50
Newfoundland and Labrador	100	80–100	100	80–100	50
Northwest Territories	N/A			100	45
Nova Scotia	100–110	100	100–110	80–100	50
Nunavut	N/A			50	30
Ontario	110	80–110	90–100	80–90	40–50
Prince Edward Island	N/A			80–90	50
Saskatchewan	110	90–100	100–110	100	50
Quebec	100	70–100	100	80–90	50
Yukon	N/A		70	100	50

== Regulations ==
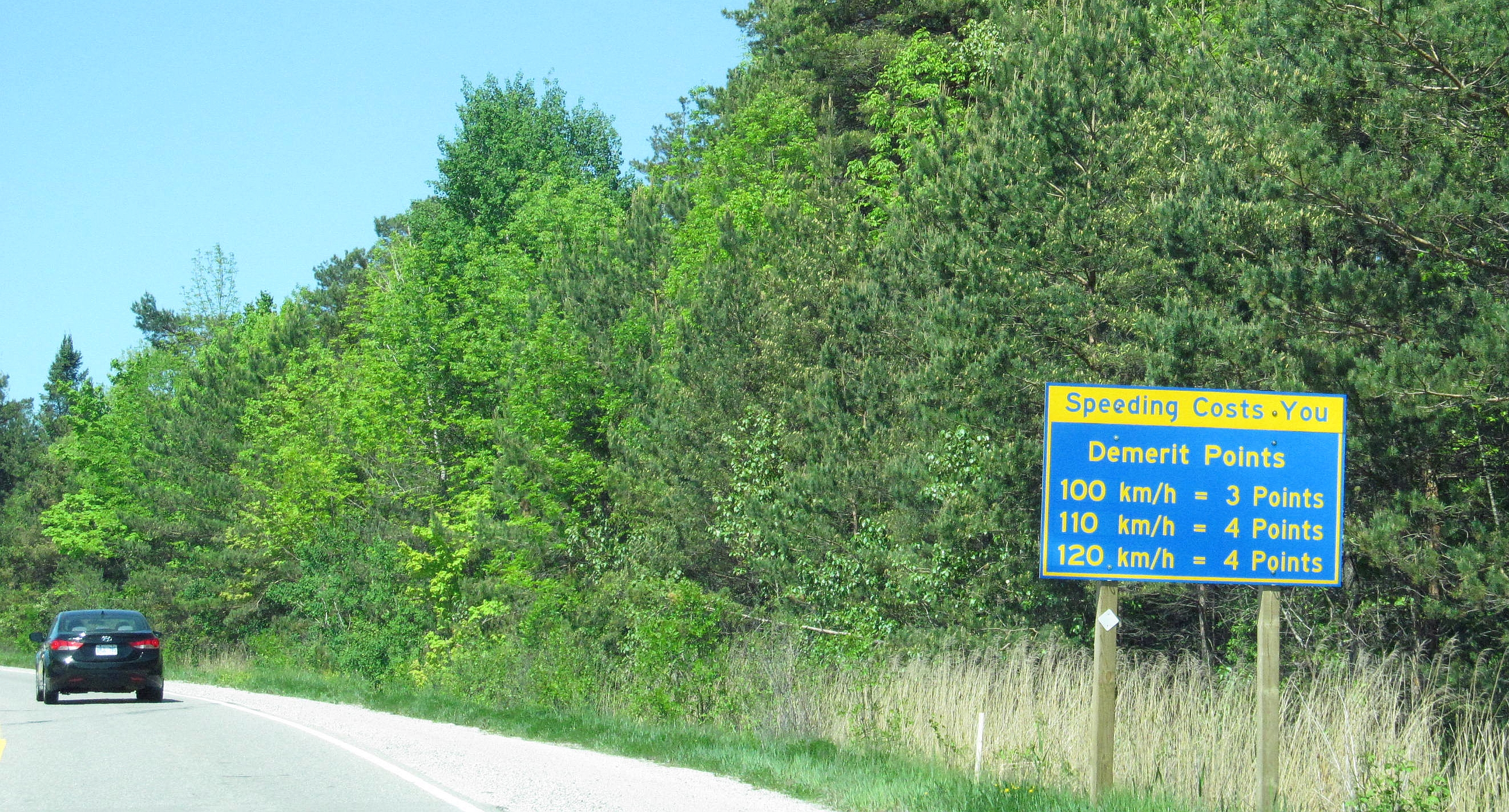
Speeding penalties on a rural Ontario highway

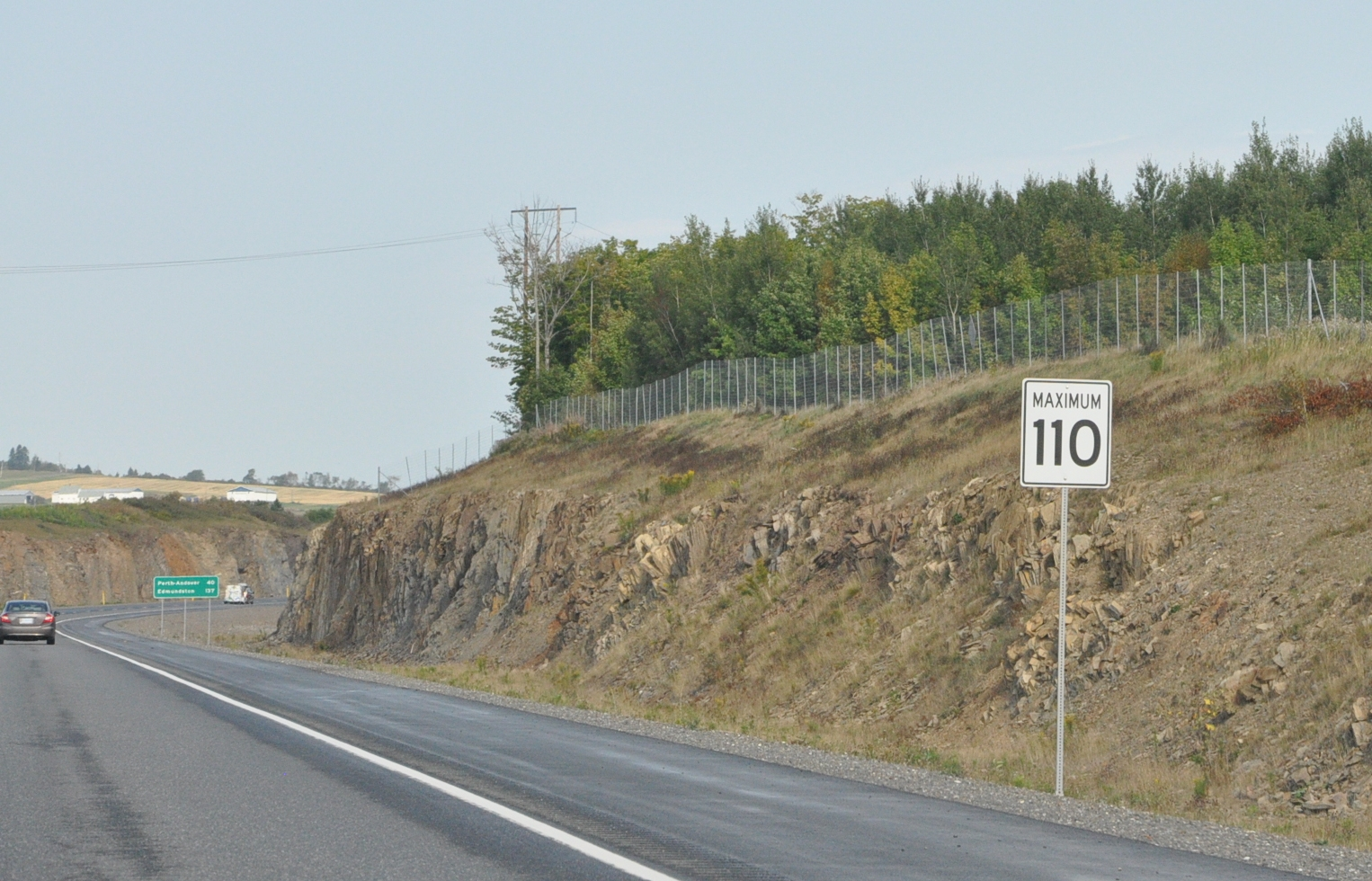
110 km/h speed limit on the Trans-Canada Highway in New Brunswick

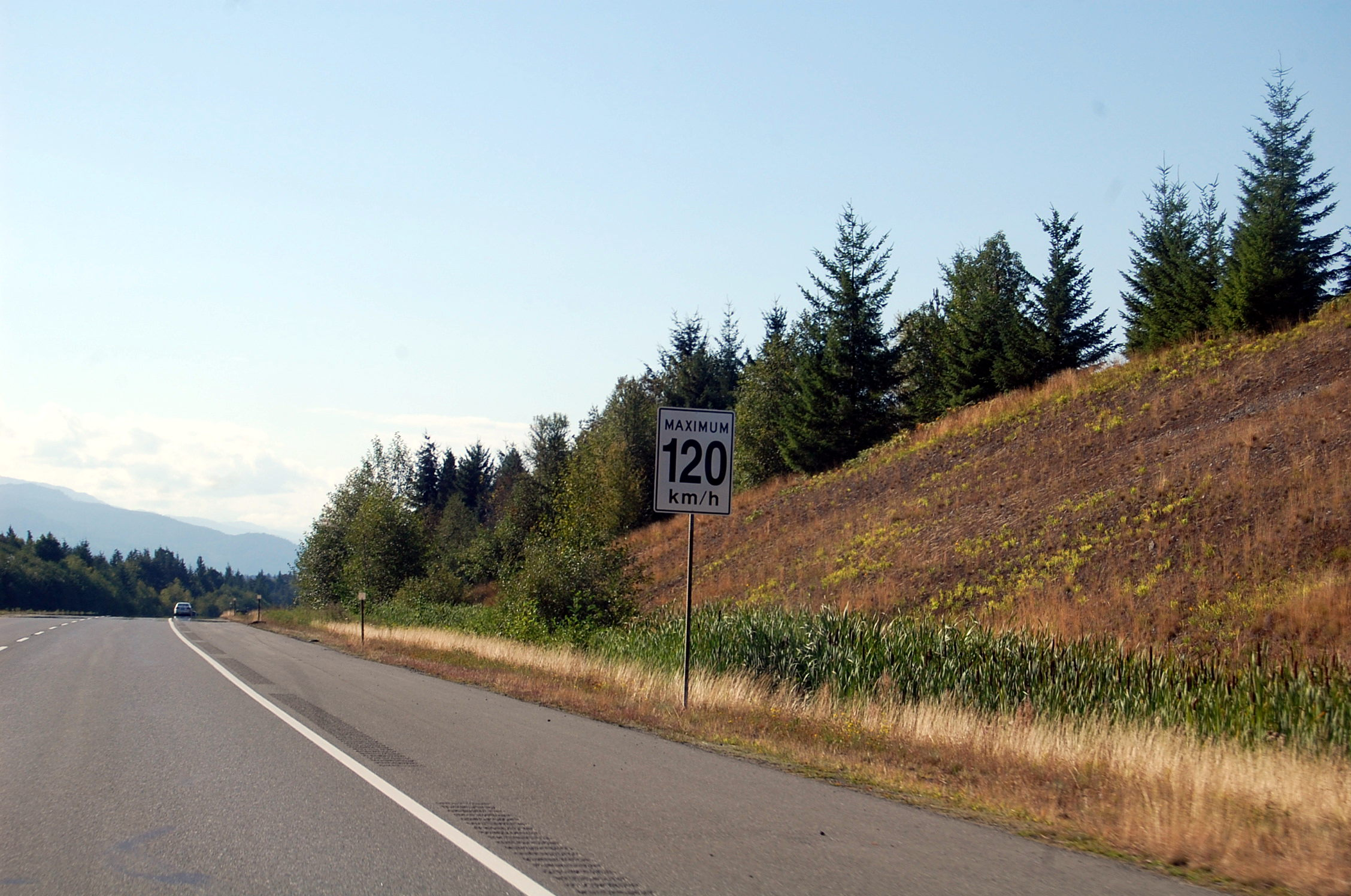
120 km/h speed limit on Island Highway (BC 19), north of Parksville; as of 2014 this is the highest signed speed limit in Canada

=== Community safety zones and automated speed enforcement ===
In Ontario, speeding fines are doubled in areas identified as "Community Safety Zones". On November 14, 2025, the section of the Highway Traffic Act that permitted automated speed enforcement was struck. Instead, the government launched a $210 million road safety initiatives fund for municipalities to implement traffic calming measures.

=== Construction zones ===
In most Canadian provinces, as in most other locales, speed violation fines are double (or more) in construction zones, although in Ontario and Alberta, this only applies if workers are present in the construction zone.

=== Racing, contests and stunt driving ===
In Ontario, as of September 2007, drivers caught exceeding the posted speed limit by 50 km/h or more may have the vehicle that they are driving impounded immediately for seven days, have their licence suspended for seven days, and have to appear before the court. For a first conviction, they face an additional $2,000–$10,000 fine and six demerit points; they may also face up to six months in jail and licence suspension of up to two years. For a second conviction within 10 years of the first conviction, their licence may be suspended for up to 10 years.

=== Truck speed limiters ===
Since 2009 in both Ontario and Quebec, trucks must be equipped with devices to electronically limit their speed to 105 km/h (65 mph). In 2012, an Ontario court ruled that the law violated the Canadian Charter of Rights and Freedoms, however the law was upheld by the Ontario Court of Appeal in 2015. In April 2024, 105 km/h speed limiters also became mandatory for commercial trucks in British Columbia.

=== Radar detectors ===
Radar detectors in Canada are legal only in British Columbia, Alberta and Saskatchewan. They are illegal to use or possess in the other provinces and all three territories. Regardless of whether they are used or not, police and law enforcement officers may confiscate radar detectors, operational or not, and impose substantial fines in provinces where radar detectors are illegal. Quebec penalizes $500 for use of a radar detector, along with confiscation of the device.

== Signage ==
A speed limit sign reads "MAXIMUM XX", such as "MAXIMUM 80" for 80 km/h. A minimum speed sign reads "XX MINIMUM", such as "60 MINIMUM" for 60 km/h.

Speed limit sign

Minimum speed limit sign

Speed limit sign in Ontario

Speed limit sign in British Columbia and Yukon

Upcoming/advance notice of speed limit change sign

Upcoming/advance notice of speed limit change sign in British Columbia and Yukon

Speed limit change sign in Ontario

Speed limit sign in Quebec

Speed limit ends sign in British Columbia

Recommended speed sign

Exit recommended speed sign in Quebec; Anglophone signs read EXIT or RAMP

Exit recommended speed sign in Ontario

Metric signage reminder in British Columbia, posted on highways near the US border, to and from ferry terminals on Vancouver Island, and international airports

Metric signage reminder in Quebec, posted near US border

== Review of speed limits ==
=== British Columbia ===
In British Columbia, a review of speed limits conducted in 2002 and 2003 for the Ministry of Transportation found that posted limits on investigated roads were unrealistically low for 1,309 km and unrealistically high for 208 km. The report recommended increasing speed limits on multi-lane limited-access highways constructed to high design standards from 110 km/h to 120 km/h. As described in that report, the Ministry is currently using "Technical Circular T-10/00 ... to assess speed limits. The practice considers the 85th percentile speed, road geometry, roadside development, and crash history." In July 2014, speed limits were adjusted on many of the province's highways, including some which were increased to 120 km/h (75 mph), currently the highest speed limit in Canada. Some of the sections were later rolled back due to a study finding "marked deterioration in road safety", which critics called the study misleading due to an oversimplification of the data.

=== Alberta ===
On April 29, 2026, Alberta increased the speed limit on a 22 km (14 mi) stretch of Highway 2 south of Leduc from 110 km/h (68 mph) to 120 km/h (75 mph) on a trial basis, with considerations to increase the speed limit to 120 km/h (75 mph) on most rural highways depending on the outcome of the trial. Later that year, on September 10, 2026, the trial section was extended further south, totalling 44 km (27 mi).

=== Ontario ===
Ontario's first provincial legislation governing automobile use came into effect in 1903, which included a 15 mph (24 km/h) speed limit. The first provincial Highway Traffic Act (passed in 1923) changed the speed limit for highways to 25 mph (40 km/h).

Limits were later increased, for rural roads, to 50 mph (80 km/h) and then again to 60 mph (97 km/h). In 1968, the maximum speed limit for freeways was raised to 70 mph (110 km/h). In 1976, due to the oil crisis, the maximum speed limit was reduced while simultaneously being metrified to 100 km/h (62 mph) for freeways, while the rural limit was reduced to 80 km/h (50 mph), except for main highways running through northern Ontario, which were reduced to 90 km/h (56 mph). In 1977, as a result of the metrification, the speed limits increased slightly to a maximum ranging from 80 to 100 km/h (50 to 62 mph) while signs were being changed.

In 2012, an Ontario-based group lobbied to increase speed limits on the 400-series highways from 100 km/h to 120 to 130 km/h (75 to 81 mph). However, the Minister of Transportation at the time Bob Chiarelli rejected the petition, citing speed accounted for 20% of fatal collisions, and that Ontario highways were among the safest in North America and he intended to keep it that way.

In 2015, the Ontario government announced a plan to reduce residential speed limits from the statutory default 50 km/h, either by reducing the statutory limit to 40 km/h or by giving municipalities the option to set their own statutory speed limits, as well as allowing posted speed limits in school zones to be lowered to 30 km/h.

On May 10, 2019, the government announced plans to increase the speed limit on 400-series highways on a trial basis. Later that year, on September 26, 2019, the speed limits were increased from 100 km/h (62 mph) to 110 km/h (68 mph) on three sections of freeways on a two-year trial basis. In 2021, the trial was extended until 2023 due to the COVID-19 pandemic significantly reducing traffic in 2020. On April 22, 2022, the three trialed sections were made permanent along with three additional sections while two new sections were trialed. On July 12, 2024, the two trialed sections were made permanent, in addition to 10 new sections. On June 24, 2026, the government announced that the speed limit would increase from 100 km/h (62 mph) to 110 km/h (68 mph) on all remaining freeway sections "where it was safe to do so". Nearly 89% of freeways now have the 110 km/h (68 mph) speed limit.
