= Bevan, British Columbia =

Coordinates: 49°39′59″N 125°05′04″W

Bevan was a community on Vancouver Island, British Columbia, Canada. It was created as a company town for several Dunsmuir, later Canadian Collieries, coal mines. A post office operated from 1913 to 1957. The town was named after a foreman for Comox Logging Company.

== See also ==
- Cumberland, British Columbia
