= Marble River Provincial Park =

Provincial park in British Columbia, Canada

- IUCN category II (national park)
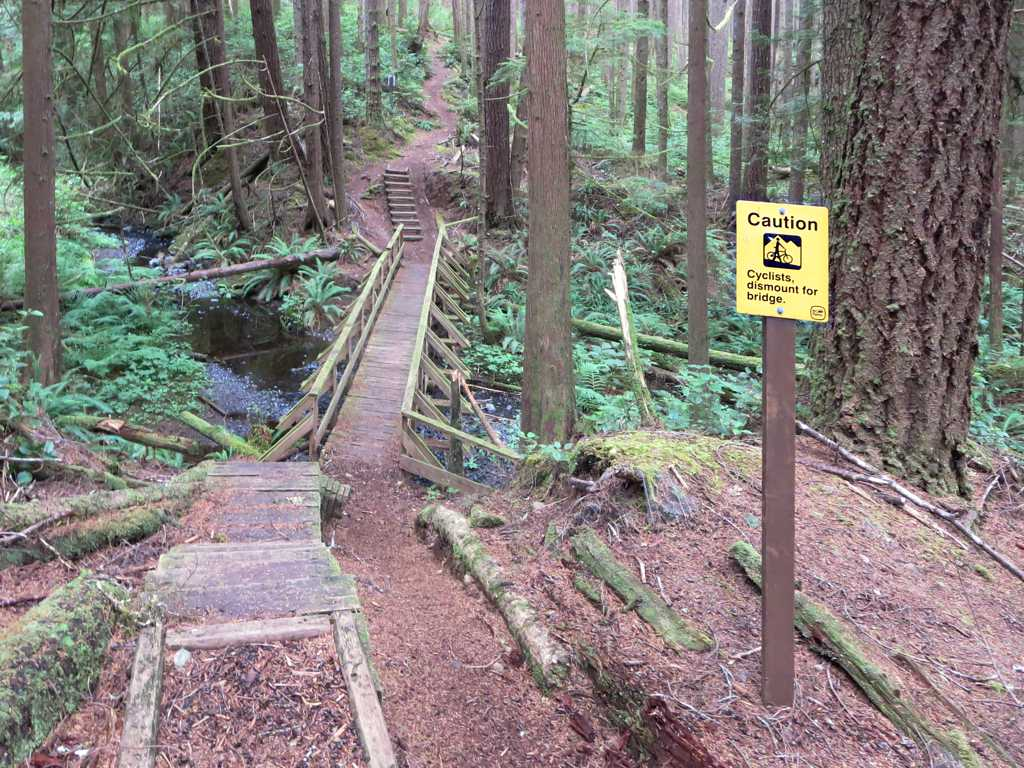
- Panoramic view

- Location within Vancouver Island Location within British Columbia
- Interactive map of Marble River Provincial Park
- Location: British Columbia, Canada
- Nearest city: Port Hardy
- Coordinates: 50°32′29″N 127°31′40″W
- Area: 14.19 km^{2} (5.48 sq mi)
- Established: July 13, 1995
- Governing body: BC Parks

Marble River Provincial Park is a provincial park in British Columbia, Canada. The park is located on northern Vancouver Island. It is 14.19 km^{2} (5.48 sq mi) in area. The park protects an eagle nesting habitat near Quatsino Narrows in Quatsino Sound, a steelhead fishery, and an extensive waterfowl habitat. A 4.2 km (2.6 mi)-long biking or walking trail is available, as well as opportunities for wildlife viewing.

== Sources ==
- British Columbia Ministry of the Environment - Marble River Provincial Park. Accessed April 8, 2007.
