= Regional District of Nanaimo =

Regional district in British Columbia, Canada

Coordinates: 49°15′00″N 124°20′00″W

Nanaimo
- Regional district
- Regional District of Nanaimo
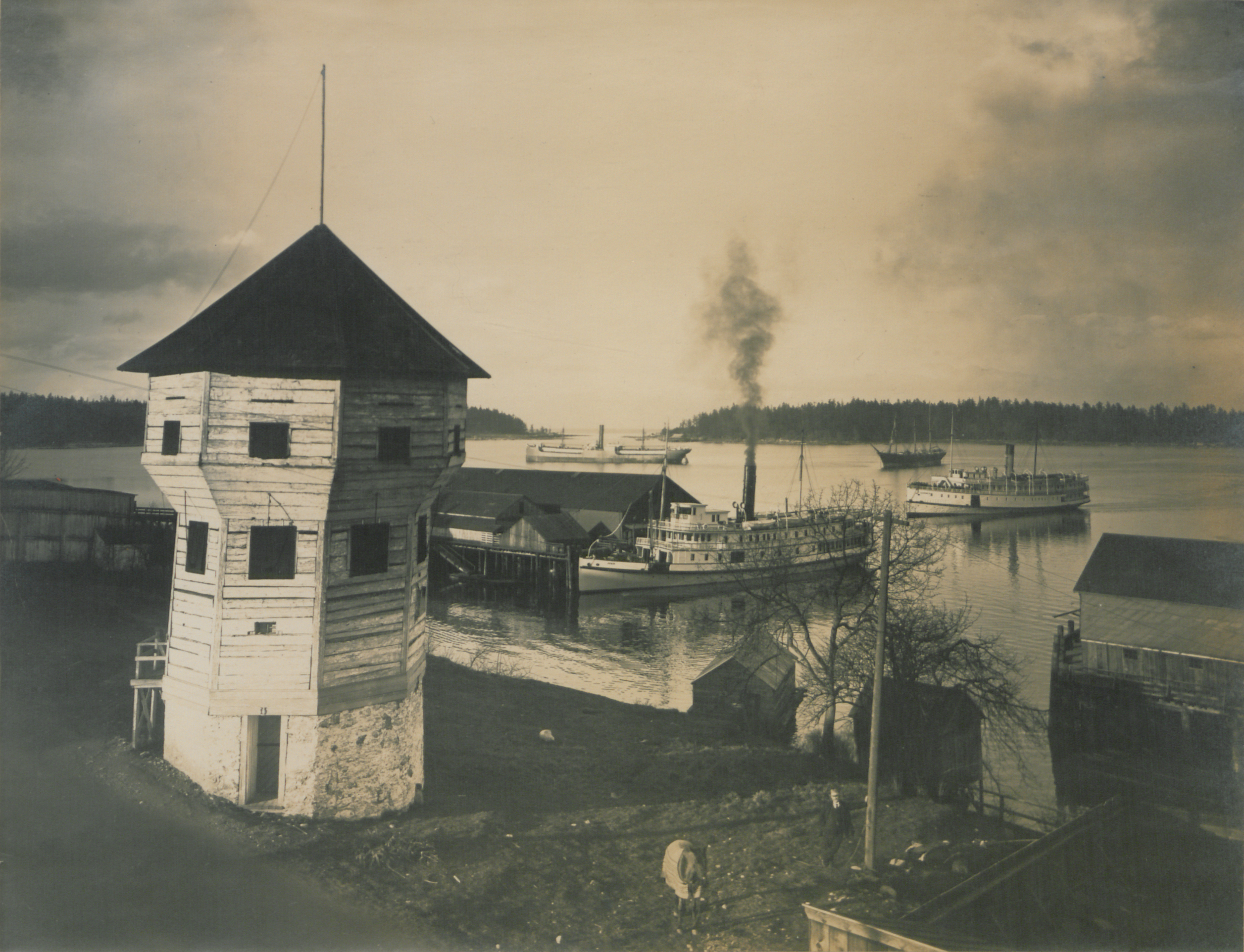
- Nanaimo Bastion

- Logo

- Location in British Columbia
- Country: Canada
- Province: British Columbia
- Administrative office location: Nanaimo

Government
  - Type: Regional district
  - Body: Board of directors
  - Chair: Stuart McLean (H)
  - Vice chair: Lauren Melanson (C)
  - Electoral areas: A - Cassidy/Cedar/South Wellington; B - De Courcy/Gabriola/Mudge; C - Arrowsmith/Benson; E - Nanoose Bay; F - Alberni Highway; G - Mid-Oceanside; H - Lighthouse Country

Area
  - Land: 2,038.04 km^{2} (786.89 sq mi)

Population (2021)
  - Total: 170,367
  - Density: 83.6/km^{2} (217/sq mi)
- Website: www.rdn.bc.ca

The Regional District of Nanaimo is a regional district located on the eastern coast of Vancouver Island, British Columbia, Canada. It is bordered to the south by the Cowichan Valley Regional District, to the west by the Alberni-Clayoquot Regional District, and to the northwest by the Comox Valley Regional District. Its administration offices are located in Nanaimo. During the 2016 census, its population was established at 155,698.

The Regional District of Nanaimo was incorporated on August 24, 1967. It has members that are cities, towns, districts, and seven electoral areas that contain unincorporated communities.

The region owns and operates the Nanaimo Regional Transit System, which provides conventional local bus routes and special needs paratransit services.

== Incorporated municipalities ==
Municipality	Government Type	Population
Nanaimo	city	90,504
Parksville	city	12,514
Qualicum Beach	town	8,687
Lantzville	district municipality	3,601

== Electoral areas ==
Electoral areas have no administrative or governmental function, and are used only to select rural representatives to the Regional District board. Statistics Canada also uses them as census subdivisions.

=== Area A (Cassidy/Cedar/South Wellington) ===
This electoral area is located on Vancouver Island, on the Stuart Channel southeast of Nanaimo. Jessica Stanley is the elected RDN Director for the electoral area.

According to the Canada 2021 Census:

- Population: 7,481 (exclusive of any residents of Indian Reserves)
- % Change (2016–2021): 6.0
- Dwellings: 3,249
- Area (km²): 60.18
- Density (persons per km²): 124.3

Contains the communities of Cassidy, Cedar, and South Wellington. Nanaimo Airport is also located here.

=== Area B (Gabriola Island) ===
This electoral area contains DeCourcy Island, Gabriola Island and Mudge Island. Vanessa Craig is the elected RDN Director for the electoral area.

According to the Canada 2016 Census:

- Population: 4,033 (exclusive of any residents of Indian Reserves)
- % Change (2011–2016): -0.3
- Dwellings: 2,987
- Area (km²): 57.76
- Density (persons per km²): 69.8

=== Area C (Arrowsmith/Benson) ===
This electoral area is located on Vancouver Island, to the southwest of Nanaimo. It contains the upper Nanaimo River, the Nanaimo Lakes, Mount Benson and Mount Arrowsmith. Lauren Melanson is the elected RDN Director for the electoral area.

According to the Canada 2016 Census:

- Population: 2,808 (exclusive of any residents of Indian Reserves)
- % Change (2011–2016): -0.9
- Dwellings: 1,097
- Area (km²): 1,098.94
- Density (persons per km²): 2.6

Contains the communities of East Wellington and Extension.

=== Area E (Nanoose Bay) ===
This electoral area is located on Vancouver Island, on the shore of the Strait of Georgia, between Lantzville and Parksville. It is co-extensive with the community of Nanoose Bay. Bob Rogers is the elected RDN Director for the electoral area.

According to the Canada 2016 Census:

- Population: 6,125 (exclusive of any residents of Indian Reserves)
- % Change (2011–2016): 7.9
- Dwellings: 3,066
- Area (km²): 75.08
- Density (persons per km²): 81.6

=== Area F (Alberni Highway) ===
This electoral area is located on Vancouver Island, to the west of Qualicum Beach and Parksville. British Columbia Highway 4 runs the length of the area. Leanne Salter is the elected RDN Director for the electoral area.

According to the Canada 2016 Census:

- Population: 7,724 (exclusive of any residents of First Nation Reserves)
- % Change (2011–2016): 4.1
- Dwellings: 3,530
- Area (km²): 264.36
- Density (persons per km²): 29.2

Includes the communities of Coombs, Errington, Hilliers, Meadowood and Whiskey Creek, as well as Cameron Lake and Cathedral Grove.

=== Area G (Mid-Oceanside) ===
This electoral area is located on Vancouver Island, on the shore of the Strait of Georgia, surrounding Qualicum Beach and almost surrounding Parksville. Lehann Wallace is the elected RDN Director for the electoral area.

According to the Canada 2016 Census:

- Population: 7,465 (exclusive of any residents of Indian Reserves)
- % Change (1996–2001): 4.3
- Dwellings: 3,553
- Area (km²): 49.32
- Density (persons per km²): 151.4

Contains the communities of Dashwood and French Creek.

=== Area H (Lighthouse Country) ===
This electoral area is located on Vancouver Island, on the shore of the Strait of Georgia at the southern entrance to Baynes Sound, northwest of Qualicum Beach. Stuart McLean is the elected RDN Director for the electoral area.

According to the Canada 2016 Census:

- Population: 3,884 (exclusive of any residents of Indian Reserves)
- % Change (1996–2001): 10.7
- Dwellings: 2,436
- Area (km²): 277.41
- Density (persons per km²): 14.0

Contains the communities of Bowser, Deep Bay, Dunsmuir and Horne Lake, as well as the Shaw Hill area in its southeastern part.

== Demographics ==
As a census division in the 2021 Census of Population conducted by Statistics Canada, the Regional District of Nanaimo had a population of 170,367 living in 75,273 of its 80,056 total private dwellings, a change of 9.4% from its 2016 population of 155,698. With a land area of 2,035.93 km^{2} (786.08 sq mi), it had a population density of 83.7/km^{2} (216.7/sq mi) in 2021.

Panethnic groups in the Nanaimo Regional District (2001−2021)
Panethnic group	2021		2016		2011		2006		2001	
Panethnic group	Pop.	%	Pop.	%	Pop.	%	Pop.	%	Pop.	%
European (Note: Statistic includes all persons that did not make up part of a visible minority or an indigenous identity.)	138,015	83.06%	130,140	85.83%	126,620	88.57%	122,405	89.25%	114,310	91.05%
Indigenous	12,210	7.35%	10,635	7.01%	8,390	5.87%	6,815	4.97%	5,375	4.28%
East Asian (Note: Statistic includes total responses of "Chinese", "Korean", and "Japanese" under visible minority section on census.)	5,080	3.06%	3,885	2.56%	2,805	1.96%	3,140	2.29%	2,070	1.65%
Southeast Asian (Note: Statistic includes total responses of "Filipino" and "Southeast Asian" under visible minority section on census.)	3,475	2.09%	2,275	1.5%	1,440	1.01%	1,415	1.03%	1,520	1.21%
South Asian	3,450	2.08%	2,255	1.49%	1,940	1.36%	2,090	1.52%	1,410	1.12%
African	1,410	0.85%	950	0.63%	600	0.42%	480	0.35%	325	0.26%
Latin American	925	0.56%	565	0.37%	465	0.33%	260	0.19%	260	0.21%
Middle Eastern (Note: Statistic includes total responses of "West Asian" and "Arab" under visible minority section on census.)	775	0.47%	465	0.31%	270	0.19%	150	0.11%	105	0.08%
Other (Note: Statistic includes total responses of "Visible minority, n.i.e." and "Multiple visible minorities" under visible minority section on census.)	830	0.5%	445	0.29%	435	0.3%	395	0.29%	180	0.14%
Total responses	166,165	97.53%	151,630	97.39%	142,955	97.53%	137,150	98.93%	125,550	98.85%
Total population	170,367	100%	155,698	100%	146,574	100%	138,631	100%	127,016	100%

- Note: Totals greater than 100% due to multiple origin responses.

== Administrative role ==
The Regional District of Nanaimo categorizes its responsibilities into five "action areas":

- The Regional Federation
- Strategic and Community Development
- Transportation and Solid Waste
- Regional and Community Utilities
- Recreation and Parks

== See also ==
- List of historic places in the Nanaimo Regional District
