= Cumberland, British Columbia =

Town in British Columbia, Canada

Cumberland
- Town
- The Corporation of the Town of Cumberland
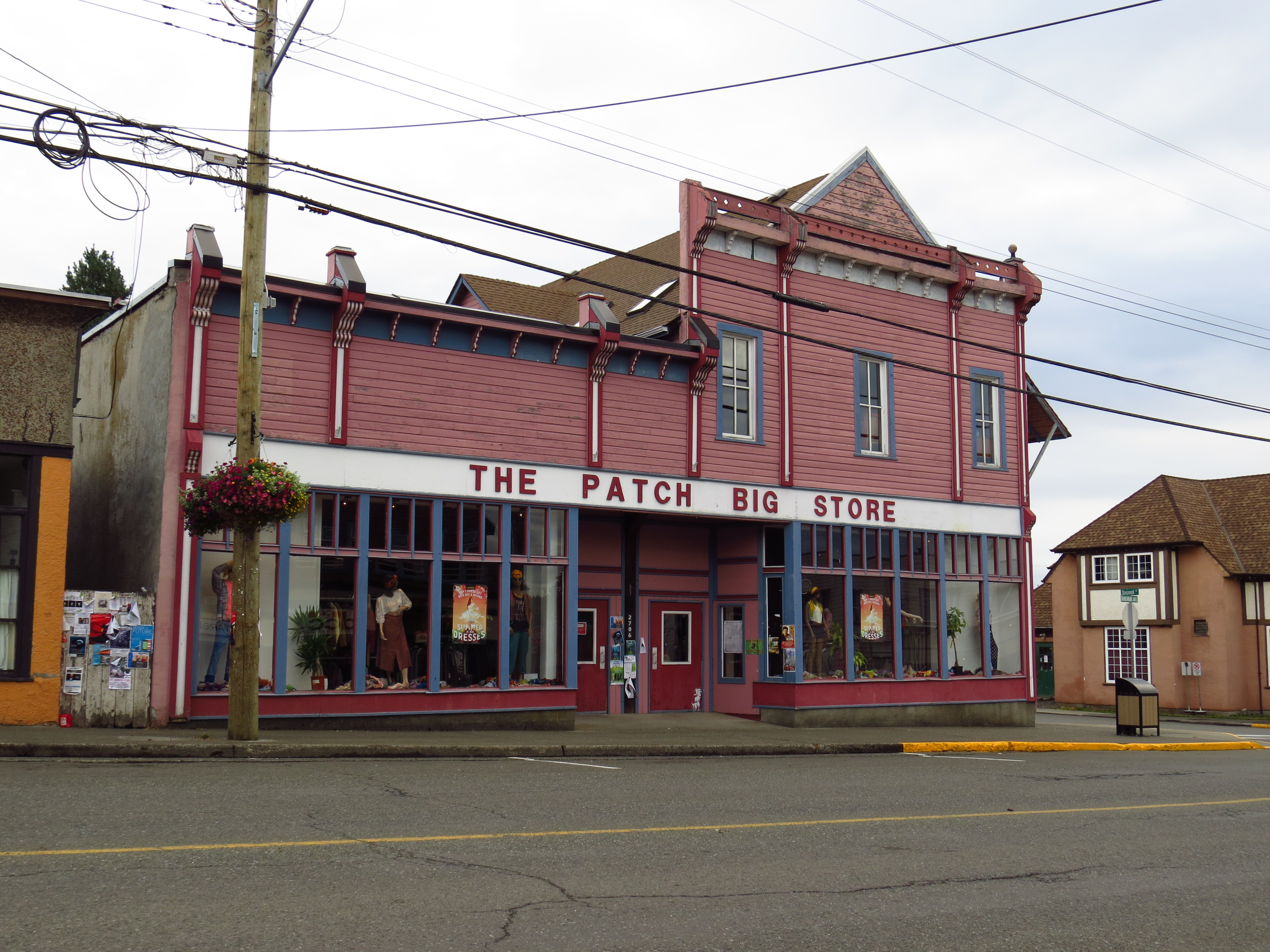
- General store (1894)

- Cumberland Cumberland (British Columbia)
- Coordinates: 49°37′8″N 125°01′53″W
- Country: Canada
- Province: British Columbia
- Region: Mid-Island
- Regional district: Comox Valley
- Incorporated: 1898

Government
  - Governing body: Cumberland Village Council
  - Mayor: Vicky Brown

Area
  - Total: 29.11 km^{2} (11.24 sq mi)
- Elevation: 160 m (520 ft)

Population (2021)
  - Total: 4,447
  - Density: 128.9/km^{2} (334/sq mi)
- Time zone: UTC−07:00 (PT)
- Postal code: V0R 1S0
- Area codes: 250, 778, 236, & 672
- Highways: Highway 19
- Website: Cumberland

Cumberland is an incorporated village municipality east of Perseverance Creek, near the east coast of central Vancouver Island, British Columbia. The Comox Valley community is west of BC Highway 19 and is by road about 105 kilometres (65 mi) northwest of Nanaimo and 10 kilometres (6 mi) southwest of Courtenay.

== History ==
=== Prospecting & preliminary activity ===
Although First Nations had long known the existence of coal in the area, J.W. Mackay discovered coal near today's town site while exploring in 1852. Armed with such knowledge, Sam Cliffe formed a syndicate, which in 1869 staked claims on Perseverance (formerly Coal) Creek that flows northwest into Comox Lake. The group hacked a trail to today's Royston. Their Union Coal Mining Co., named to honour the 1871 union of British Columbia with Canada, graded sections for a rail bed along this route. A sawpit was established about halfway, with some wooden rails cut and laid for a horse-drawn tramway. Unable to raise further capital when funds were exhausted, development work ceased.

In 1887, Robert Dunsmuir bought the enterprise and incorporated the Union Colliery Co. He arranged for a sawmill to be brought to the mine area. After unloading at today's Royston, oxen hauled the machinery. Only 2.4 kilometres (1.5 mi) of the earlier rail bed remained passable. For the 5-kilometre (3 mi) gap, Grant and Mounce built a wagon road while advancing, taking two to three months to reach the mine.

=== Coal mining ===
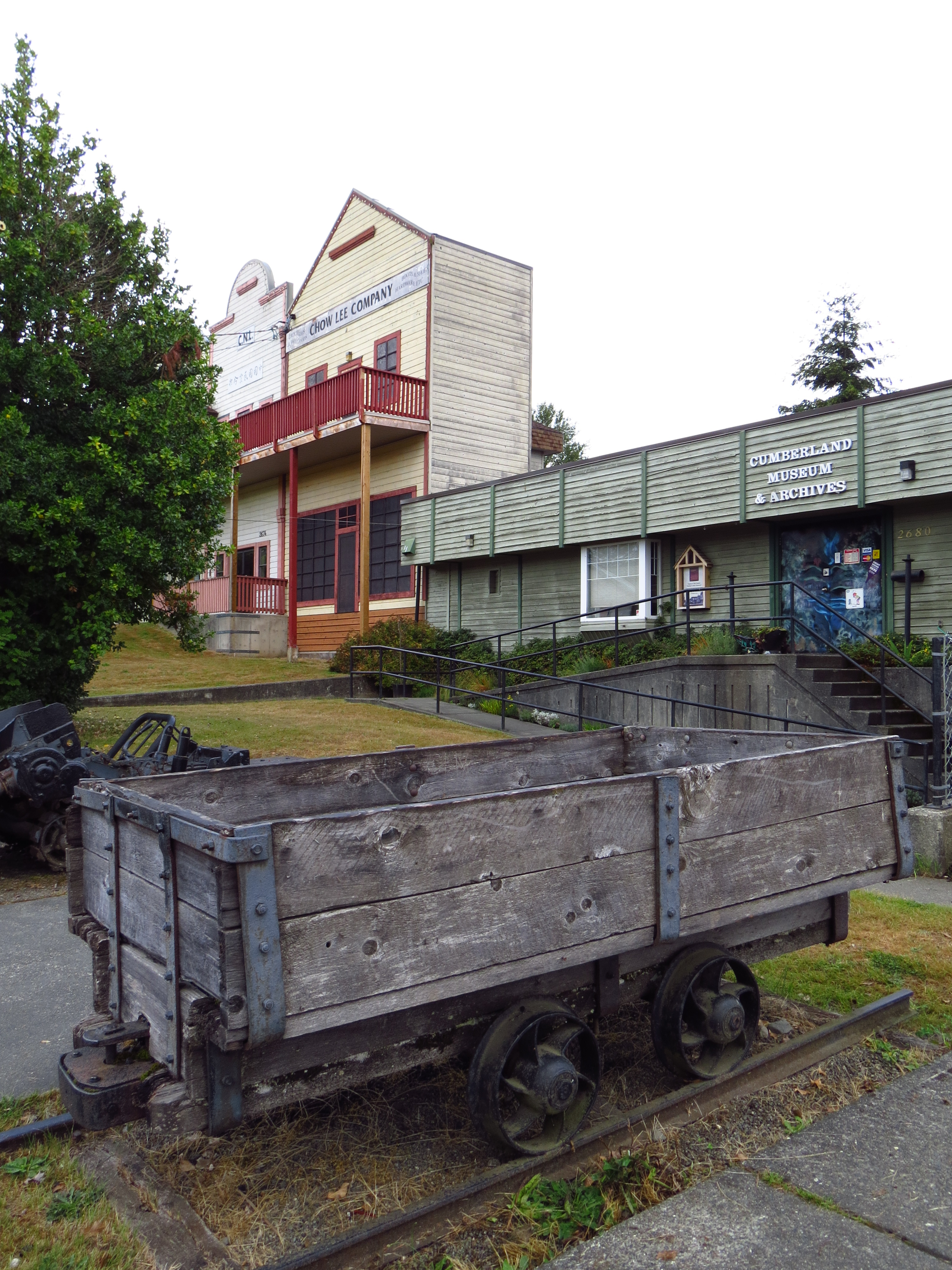
Mine trolley, Cumberland, 2013.

Coal production was 31,204 tons in 1889, and 66,556 tons in 1892. By 1897, the mine was yielding 700 to 1,000 tons per day, and employed 600 men.

In 1910, Sir William Mackenzie purchased all the Dunsmuir mines through his Canadian Collieries (Dunsmuir). In 1912, the colliery established a hydroelectric plant on the Puntledge River, which supplied the whole Comox Valley.

Total miners killed in a single coal dust explosion at Cumberland were 64 in 1901, 21 in 1903, 18 in 1922, and 33 in 1923.

In 1912, management locked out protesting Cumberland miners who took an idle day. Industrial action spread, and all unionized Vancouver Island miners were on strike by summer 1913. Strikebreakers were protected by special police, until riots broke out at Cumberland, which prompted the BC government to send in troops.

Tsable River mine, about 8 kilometres (5 mi) west of Buckley Bay was the final Canadian Colleries mine operating on Vancouver Island. The miners were based at Cumberland. On closure in 1960, an employee-owned smaller operation ran until final closure in 1966.

=== Early settlement ===
The company village was originally named Union after the Union Coal Company. In 1894, adjacent to the neighbourhood, a new townsite of Cumberland was laid out with lots for sale. Exports from the Cumberland Coalfield in Great Britain were known for a high quality also found at the Union mine. Consequently, the principal avenues of Maryport, Windermere, Penrith, Derwent, Allen and Keswick, were named after places in Cumberland County. In 1898, the Cumberland name was adopted for incorporation as a city, and to replace Union for the post office.

In 1895, the hospital began in James Dunsmuir's former residence. Later additions were nine rooms in 1901, a 10-bed ward in 1904, and Jubilee Wing in 1924. Ultimately 41 beds and 6 bassinets existed. In 1977, the hospital closed.

In 1897, the Cumberland-Union Water-Works Company commenced piping water from Hamilton Creek. In 1949, the then City of Cumberland purchased the system.

The 1933 fire destroyed 18 businesses and 11 houses. The hotels affected were the Cumberland, the King George and the Victory. The Cumberland, opened in 1894, was immediately rebuilt, and operated until November 2020. The King George, built in 1911, also rebuilt, closed in 2014. Escaped and built a few years earlier, the Waverley Hotel still operates.

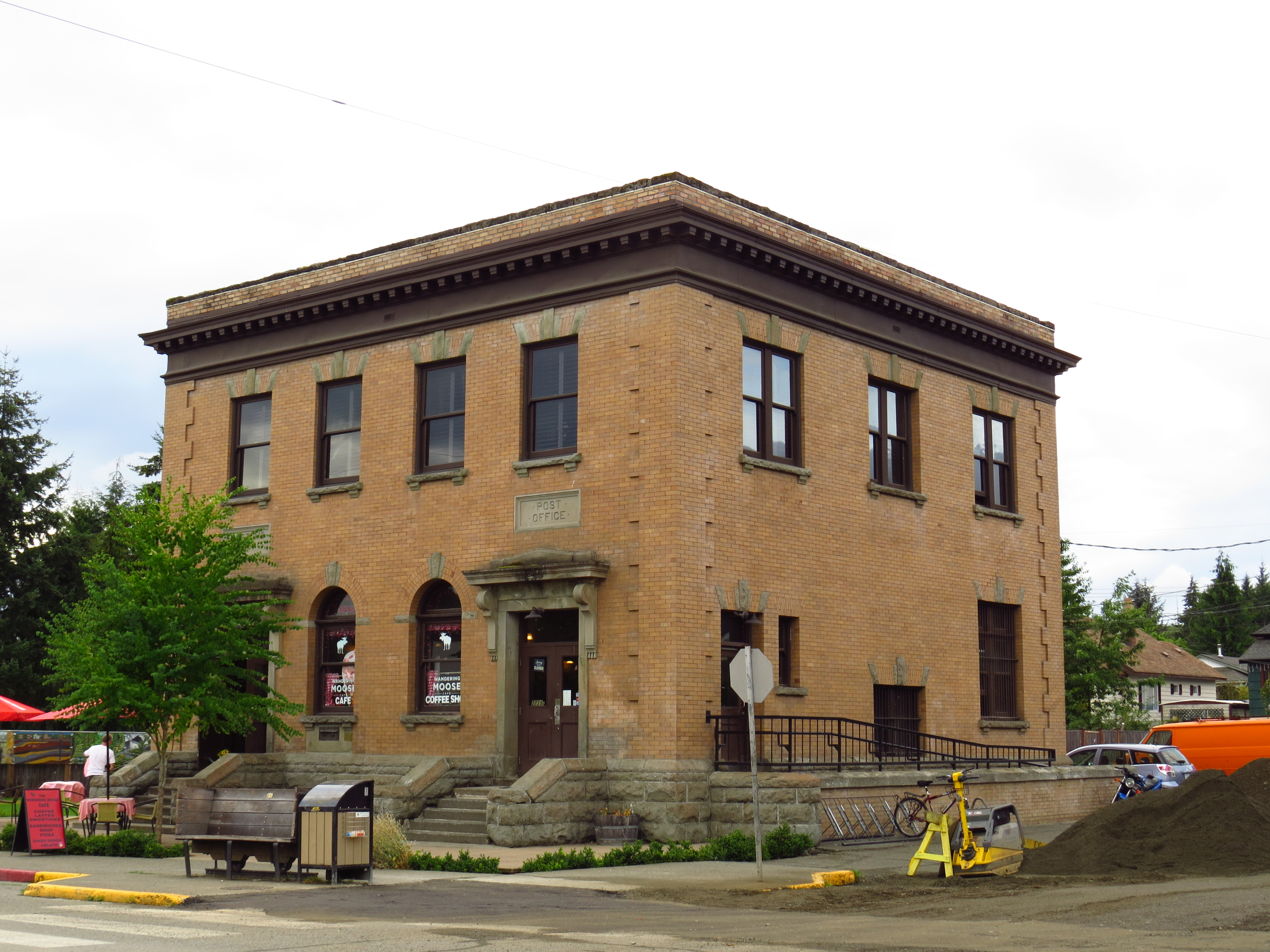
Former post office (1907), Cumberland, 2013.

Opened as an opera house in 1914, the historic Ilo-Ilo Theatre began showing silent movies, and held dances. Rebuilt after a 1932 fire, the theatre closed in 1957. Discussions are ongoing to restore the building.

=== Later settlement ===
In 1958, the community reincorporated as the Village of Cumberland. In 1969, the Royal Canadian Mounted Police (RCMP) detachment closed, and the three officers moved to Courtenay. Over recent decades, Cumberland has become a significant destination for outdoor recreation, culture and tourism. The location is a bedroom community for Courtenay. Cumberland Lake Park Campground is 3 kilometres (2 mi) west. The village prepared the Economic Development Strategy 2018–2023 to address challenges.

== Demographics ==
In the 2021 Census of Population conducted by Statistics Canada, Cumberland had a population of 4,447 living in 1,840 of its 1,918 total private dwellings, a change of 18.5% from its 2016 population of 3,753. With a land area of 29.04 km^{2} (11.21 sq mi), it had a population density of 153.1/km^{2} (396.6/sq mi) in 2021.

=== Ethnicity ===
Panethnic groups in the Village of Cumberland (1996−2021)
Panethnic group	2021		2016		2011		2006		2001		1996	
Panethnic group	Pop.	%	Pop.	%	Pop.	%	Pop.	%	Pop.	%	Pop.	%
European (Note: Statistic includes all persons that did not make up part of a visible minority or an indigenous identity.)	3,840	87.67%	3,415	92.67%	3,050	91.59%	2,480	91.51%	2,505	97.85%	2,365	96.53%
Indigenous	350	7.99%	180	4.88%	175	5.26%	225	8.3%	45	1.76%	70	2.86%
East Asian (Note: Statistic includes total responses of "Chinese", "Korean", and "Japanese" under visible minority section on census.)	70	1.6%	30	0.81%	40	1.2%	0	0%	0	0%	20	0.82%
Latin American	50	1.14%	10	0.27%	15	0.45%	0	0%	0	0%	0	0%
Southeast Asian (Note: Statistic includes total responses of "Filipino" and "Southeast Asian" under visible minority section on census.)	40	0.91%	30	0.81%	0	0%	0	0%	0	0%	0	0%
South Asian	20	0.46%	0	0%	10	0.3%	0	0%	0	0%	0	0%
African	15	0.34%	10	0.27%	50	1.5%	0	0%	10	0.39%	0	0%
Middle Eastern (Note: Statistic includes total responses of "West Asian" and "Arab" under visible minority section on census.)	0	0%	0	0%	0	0%	0	0%	0	0%	0	0%
Other/multiracial (Note: Statistic includes total responses of "Visible minority, n.i.e." and "Multiple visible minorities" under visible minority section on census.)	0	0%	0	0%	0	0%	0	0%	0	0%	0	0%
Total responses	4,380	98.49%	3,685	98.19%	3,330	98%	2,710	98.12%	2,560	97.23%	2,450	96.15%
Total population	4,447	100%	3,753	100%	3,398	100%	2,762	100%	2,633	100%	2,548	100%
Note: Totals greater than 100% due to multiple origin responses.

=== Religion ===
According to the 2021 census, religious groups in Cumberland included:

- Irreligion (3,555 persons or 81.2%)
- Christianity (725 persons or 16.6%)
- Judaism (25 persons or 0.6%)
- Other (70 persons or 1.6%)

== Coal Creek Historic Park ==
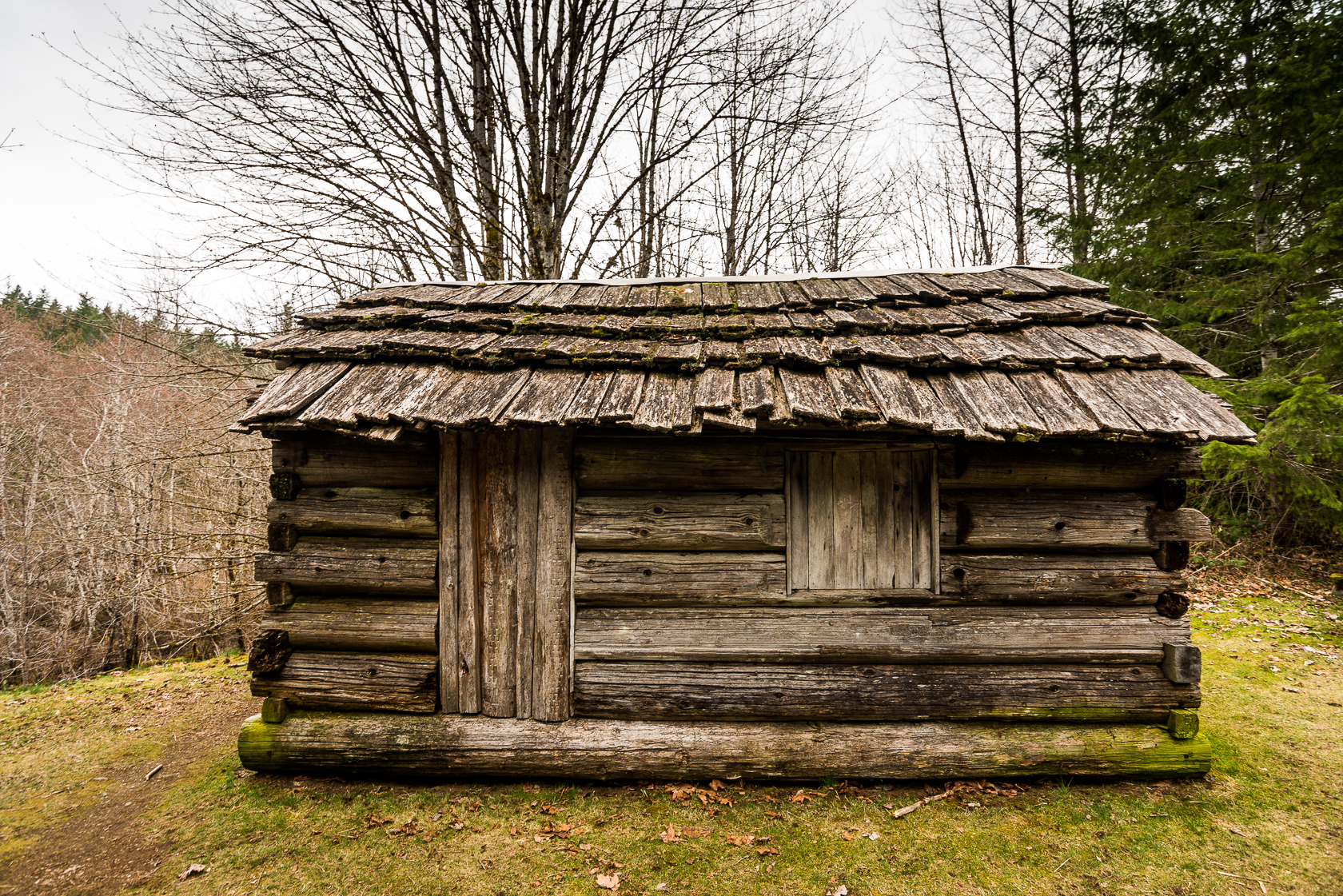
Jumbo's cabin, Chinatown Cumberland, 2018.

About 1.2 kilometres (0.7 mi) west was a Chinatown, the population peaking at around 2,000, served by 100 business establishments. Residents drained the wetlands, planted market gardens, and created one of Canada's largest Chinese communities by the end of World War I. Many of the unemployed left during the Great Depression. A 1935 fire destroyed half the buildings. After World War II many buildings were dismantled and the materials salvaged.

In 1963, a lack of funds derailed plans to restore the buildings as an historical tourist attraction. During that decade, collectors ransacked what remained of the site. The rod and gun club leased the area until 2001.

About 2.4 kilometres (1.5 mi) west of Cumberland was a Japanese hamlet, comprising about 36 homes and two general stores. The women operated a traditional tea garden at Comox Lake 1914–1939. The residents permanently abandoned the site in 1942 on their relocation to internment camps for Japanese Canadians during World War II.

Weldwood (now called West Fraser Timber), which had purchased large tracts of land from the colliery, gifted the 104-acre (42 ha) site encompassing the Chinese and Japanese settlements to the Village of Cumberland in 2002. Provisionally called Perseverance Creek Historic Park, the present name was adopted in 2008.

== Railways ==
See Railway to Union Bay.

== Notable people ==
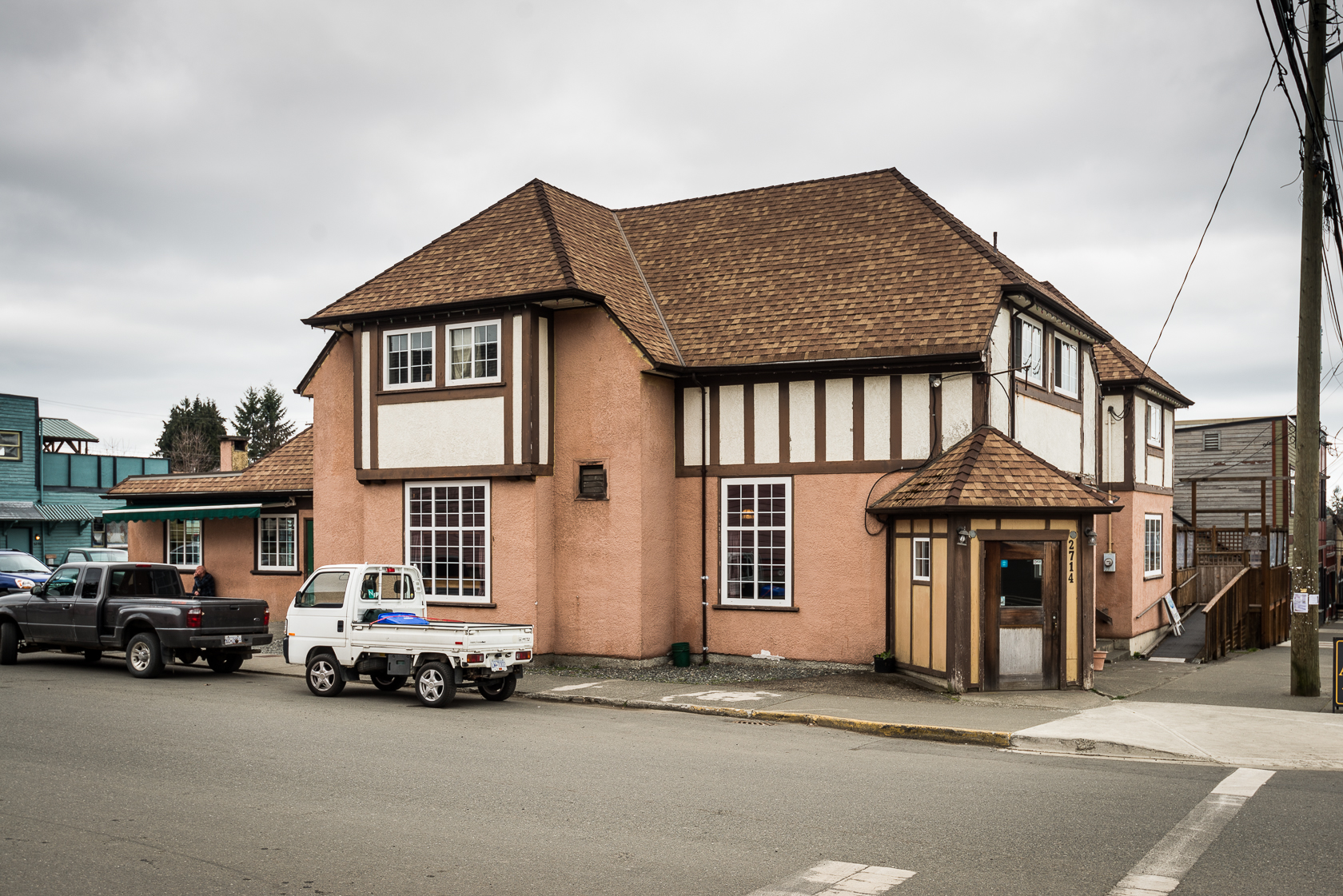
Cumberland Hotel (1933), 2013.

- Bob Auchterlonie (1969– ), naval officer
- Thomas Audley Bate (1913–1967), politician
- Albert Goodwin (1887–1918), labour activist
- Robert Grant (1854–1935), politician
- Terry Tobacco (1936–2026), athlete
- Wong Foon Sien (1899–1971), labour activist

== See also ==
- List of francophone communities in British Columbia
