= Merville, British Columbia =

Community in British Columbia, Canada

Coordinates: 49°47′N 125°04′W

Merville is an unincorporated community in the Comox Valley between the City of Courtenay, Mount Washington, Dove Creek, and Black Creek near the east coast of Vancouver Island. It was named by Canadian World War I soldiers returning to the Island after fighting in France; they named it after Merville-Franceville-Plage, where the Canadians had their first field headquarters.

== People from Merville ==
- Emily St. John Mandel, novelist
- Sarah Neufeld, ex member of Arcade Fire

== Twin Town ==
Merville-Franceville-Plage
