= Comox Valley Regional District =

Regional district in British Columbia, Canada

Coordinates: 49°45′00″N 125°00′00″W

Comox Valley
- Regional district
- Comox Valley Regional District
- Logo

- Location in British Columbia
- Country: Canada
- Province: British Columbia
- Administrative office location: Courtenay

Government
  - Type: Regional district
  - Body: Board of directors
  - Chair: Will Cole-Hamilton
  - Vice chair: Jonathan Kerr
  - Electoral areas: A – Baynes Sound–Denman/Hornby Islands; B – Lazo North; C – Puntledge–Black Creek

Area
  - Land: 1,699.90 km^{2} (656.34 sq mi)

Population (2021)
  - Total: 72,445
  - Density: 39.1/km^{2} (101/sq mi)
- Time zone: UTC−07:00 (PT)
- Website: www.comoxvalleyrd.ca

The Comox Valley Regional District is a regional district in British Columbia, Canada. It was created on February 15, 2008, encompassing the southeastern portions of the former Regional District of Comox-Strathcona, and centred about the Comox Valley. The partition left the new Comox Valley Regional District with only 8.4 percent of the former Comox-Strathcona's land area, but 57.9 percent of its population. The CVRD covers an area of 2,425 square kilometres, of which 1,725 square kilometres is land (the remainder is water), and serves a population of 72,445 according to the 2023 Census. The district borders the Strathcona Regional District to the northwest, the Alberni-Clayoquot Regional District to the southwest, and the Regional District of Nanaimo to the southeast, as well as the qathet Regional District along the Strait of Georgia to the east.

Two Indian reserves, K'omoks Indian Reserve No. 1 and Puntledge Indian Reserve No. 2, lie within its territory but are outside its jurisdiction. The census divisions comprising the new Regional District are the city of Courtenay, the town of Comox, the village of Cumberland, the district of Black Creek, Electoral Areas A, B, and C, and the two stated Indian reserves.

The administrative offices are in Courtenay, British Columbia.

== Demographics ==
As a census division in the 2021 Census of Population conducted by Statistics Canada, the Comox Valley Regional District had a population of 72,445 living in 31,939 of its 34,412 total private dwellings, a change of 8.9% from its 2016 population of 66,527. With a land area of 1,697.03 km^{2} (655.23 sq mi), it had a population density of 42.7/km^{2} (110.6/sq mi) in 2021.

Panethnic groups in the Comox Valley Regional District (2001−2021)
Panethnic group	2021		2016		2011	
Panethnic group	Pop.	%	Pop.	%	Pop.	%
European (Note: Statistic includes all persons that did not make up part of a visible minority or an indigenous identity.)	61,875	87.01%	58,640	89.73%	57,425	91.94%
Indigenous	5,210	7.33%	3,825	5.85%	2,910	4.66%
East Asian (Note: Statistic includes total responses of "Chinese", "Korean", and "Japanese" under visible minority section on census.)	1,230	1.73%	1,180	1.81%	800	1.28%
Southeast Asian (Note: Statistic includes total responses of "Filipino" and "Southeast Asian" under visible minority section on census.)	1,050	1.48%	630	0.96%	610	0.98%
South Asian	660	0.93%	400	0.61%	170	0.27%
African	425	0.6%	320	0.49%	245	0.39%
Latin American	265	0.37%	130	0.2%	150	0.24%
Middle Eastern (Note: Statistic includes total responses of "West Asian" and "Arab" under visible minority section on census.)	120	0.17%	65	0.1%	25	0.04%
Other (Note: Statistic includes total responses of "Visible minority, n.i.e." and "Multiple visible minorities" under visible minority section on census.)	290	0.41%	170	0.26%	125	0.2%
Total responses	71,115	98.16%	65,355	98.24%	62,460	98.3%
Total population	72,445	100%	66,527	100%	63,538	100%

- Note: Totals greater than 100% due to multiple origin responses.

== Incorporated communities ==
- Town of Comox
- City of Courtenay
- Village of Cumberland

== Unincorporated communities ==
=== Comox Valley A ===
Known as the Baynes Sound-Denman/Hornby Islands electoral area, this electoral area includes the southern portion of the district, on the border with the Alberni-Clayoquot and Nanaimo Regional Districts.

According to the 2016 Canada Census:

- Population: 7,293
- % Change (2011-2016): 4.5%
- Dwellings: 4,360
- Area (km^{2}): 491.99
- Density (persons per km^{2}): 14.7

==== Communities ====
- Denman Island
- Fanny Bay
- Hornby Island
- Royston
- Union Bay

Elected Representative

	Area A Director
2008 - 2011	Bruce Joliffe
2011 - 2014	Bruce Joliffe
2014 - 2018	Bruce Joliffe
2018 - 2022	Daniel Arbour
2022 - 2026	Daniel Arbour
2026 - 2030	Daniel Arbour

=== Comox Valley B ===
Known as the Lazo North electoral area, this electoral area surrounds the town of Comox. It has no administrative or governmental function and is used only to select rural representatives to the regional district board.

According to the 2016 Census:

- Population: 7,095 (exclusive of any on-Indian Reserve residents)
- % Change (2011–2016): 2.2%
- Dwellings: 3,026
- Area (km^{2}): 54.28
- Density (persons per km^{2}): 117.9

==== Communities ====
- Balmoral Beach
- Bates Beach
- Grantham
- Lazo
- Little River
- Sandwick

Elected Representative

	Area B Director
2008 - 2011	Jim Gillis
2011 - 2014	Jim Gillis
2014 - 2018	Rod Nichol
2018 - 2022	Arzeena Hamir
2022 - 2026	Richard Hardy
2026 - 2030	Arzeena Hamir

=== Comox Valley C ===
Known as the Puntledge/Black Creek electoral area, it is located between Courtenay, Campbell River and Strathcona Provincial Park.

According to the 2016 Census:

- Population: 8,617 (exclusive of any residents of Indian Reserves)
- % Change (2011–2016): 3.5%
- Dwellings: 3,572
- Area (km^{2}): 1073.96
- Density (persons per km^{2}): 7.1

==== Communities ====
- Bevan
- Black Creek
- Headquarters
- Merville
- Mount Washington
- Puntledge
- Saratoga Beach
- Williams Beach

Elected Representative

	Area C Director
2008 - 2011	Edwin Grieve
2011 - 2014	Edwin Grieve
2014 - 2018	Edwin Grieve
2018 - 2022	Edwin Grieve
2022 - 2026	Edwin Grieve
2026 - 2030	Norm McPhail

== Transit ==
Comox Valley Transit is the regional public transportation system, operated by Watson and Ash Transportation. Funding is provided under a partnership between the region and BC Transit, the provincial agency which plans and manages municipal transit systems.

== See also ==
- Mount Geoffrey Regional Nature Park
