= Union Bay, British Columbia =

Union Bay
- Location of Union Bay in British Columbia Union Bay (British Columbia)
- Coordinates: 49°35′05″N 124°53′10″W
- Country: Canada
- Province: British Columbia
- Region: Vancouver Island
- Regional District: Comox Valley

Government
  - Type: Comox Valley Regional District
- Elevation: 3 m (9.8 ft)

Population (2011)
  - Total: 1,200
- Time zone: UTC−07:00 (PT)
- Postal code: V0R 3B0
- Area codes: 250, 778, 236, & 672
- Highways: Highway 19A
- Website: Union Bay

Union Bay is an unincorporated community located south of Hart Creek on the east coast of central Vancouver Island, British Columbia. This Comox Valley community on BC Highway 19A is by road about 93 kilometres (58 mi) north of Nanaimo, and 14 kilometres (9 mi) south of Courtenay.

== First Nations ==
Prior to the 1780s smallpox epidemic, at least 3,000 Pentlatch people lived in more than 90 large villages and small settlements throughout the area. Taking advantage of the decimation, the Lekwiltok (Euclataws), from an unaffected northern region, attacked with muskets, massacring and driving the K'ómoks south. However, the 1862 smallpox equally ravaged the Lekwiltok.

The 1946 Vancouver Island earthquake not only toppled chimneys in Union Bay, but also unearthed wooden posts in the sand and mud 15 kilometres (9 mi) north, evidencing a former Pentlatch presence. During 2019–2020, excavations for a residential estate at the mouth of Hart (formerly Washer) Creek unearthed a number of Pentlatch human remains.

The present K'ómoks First Nation comprises descendants of both the Pentlatch and K'ómoks peoples.

== Railways ==
When coal deposits were confirmed in today's Cumberland area, the plan was a railway line to a wharf at today's Royston. When Robert Dunsmuir acquired the operation in 1887, and formed the Union Colliery Co., the track surveyors were redirected 9 kilometres (6 mi) farther down the coast to today's Union Bay. The deep-water bay was better suited than Royston's shallow harbour. The 18-kilometre (11 mi) standard-gauge railway line, which included a long howe truss across the Trent River, was completed in 1889. In 1898, the bridge collapsed, plunging a mixed train over 30 metres (100 ft) into the river. Seven died and two were seriously injured. The twice weekly passenger service soon became daily. From 1929, only passenger services for shift workers remained, which buses replaced in 1946. Special trains remained initially for the annual picnic.

In May 1914, the railhead for the northward extension of the E&N Railway reached Union Bay. Prior to the construction, a horse team took two days to travel from Parksville to Union Bay.

In 1965, a Dayliner passenger train smashed into a freight car 5 kilometres (3 mi) north, injuring four. In 1979, when a CAT machine inadvertently damaged track at Mile 129 (a mile south), police warning lights alerted a northbound Dayliner passenger train to stop before a likely derailment.

Union Bay was a flag stop when Via Rail on Vancouver Island ceased in 2011. Adjacent stops were about 8 kilometres (5 mi) south to Buckley Bay, and 14 kilometres (9 mi) north to Courtenay. At the railway crossing on McLeod Rd, not even a signpost marked the flag stop location in its final years.

== Former wharves ==
Opened in 1889, the wharves were the largest constructed in BC. At the 490-metre (1,600 ft) principal wharf, four colliers could be loaded simultaneously. The other wharf handled general freight, and coal if required. In due course, the Dunsmuirs had their own fleet transporting coal to San Francisco. In 1910, Sir William Mackenzie purchased all the Dunsmuir mines through his Canadian Collieries (Dunsmuir).

During the two world wars Union Bay made a significant contribution in supplying fuel for allied freighters. Throughout the decades, the port was known for its warmth and hospitality. Blue Funnel Line steamers regularly called to replenish their coal. The final sailing ship to call and load coal was the Pamir in 1946. The final freighter was the M.S. Hikawa Maru in 1951, but coal barges continued calling during that decade.

Owned by Weldwood (now called West Fraser Timber), the long abandoned coal wharf, with trees protruding through the trestle deck, was demolished in 1966.

== Former coal infrastructure ==
In 1896, the colliery erected a "Luhrig" coal washer, and completed 100 beehive coke ovens, using imported fire bricks. When fired in the ovens, the washer output produced a high quality coke. The coal gas byproduct powered boilers operating in the locality, which included a brickyard.

During 1966–1968, all the structures were demolished. Abandoned for decades, many of the ovens had already collapsed. Vandals had smashed the windows of offices, storage sheds, the powerhouse, and the machine shops that maintained the railway rolling stock.

== Former hotels & retail ==
By 1888, the bay was known as Union Bay. The community initially assumed the name of Union Wharf (or the eastern portion of Union), but by 1893, Union Bay was used interchangeably, before gaining predominance.

George Howe, who built the Nelson Hotel in 1893, erected a store on the beach in 1886. Jack Fraser became a business partner in 1900. They opened the new Howe & Fraser general store in 1908. Howe sold his interest to Charles R. Bishop, becoming Fraser & Bishop in 1913. Bishop sold to Alf Horne becoming Fraser & Horne in 1917. Sidney Ryall bought the enterprise in 1948, while the surviving Horne family established a food market nearby. Edna Peters took over the store in 1951, and closed it in 1968. The demolition of the totally vandalized building was temporarily halted in 1976.

A 1922 fire destroyed the Wilson Hotel, a clothing store, a butcher, and four residences. The subsequent Willis Hotel (1924) was renamed the Islander Hotel in 1962. A 1955 fire destroyed the Nelson Hotel.

== Henry Wagner (criminal) ==
Henry Wagner, known as the "Flying Dutchman", robbed coastal communities, escaping to his hideaway by motorboat. One night in March 1913, while Wagner was burglarizing the Fraser & Bishop general store, two local police officers, Constables Westaway and Ross, confronted the pirate and his partner. A gunfight ensued, during which Westaway was fatally wounded. Ross managed to tackle Wagner and apprehend him after a long and bloody fight. At their Nanaimo trial, Wagner was sentenced to be hanged that August, and his accomplice, William Julian, received five years.

== Heritage Row ==
The elementary school (1915), church (1906), post office (1913), and gaolhouse (1901), form "Heritage Row" along the highway. In 1896, the initial school met in a company house. In 1899, the first schoolhouse opened. Around 1909, a second classroom was added. Replaced in 1915, later additions were a third classroom in 1922, and two more in 1953. In 2006, the school closed. The next year, the Union Bay Improvement District (UBID) bought the property, which became subject to a legal action regarding its future use.

The Union Bay Historical Society, formed in 1989, bought, restored, and now operates the post office. The former gaolhouse, moved to the same property, is now a gift shop/museum. The gaolhouse closed in the 1950s. The post office is the older of only two wooden examples operating in Canada. The Union Bay United Church is still used for Sunday services.

== Later settlement ==
The Union Bay Water Association, formed in 1953, bought the village water system from the Canadian Collieries (Dunsmuir). That year, renamed the UBID, incorporation occurred in 1960.

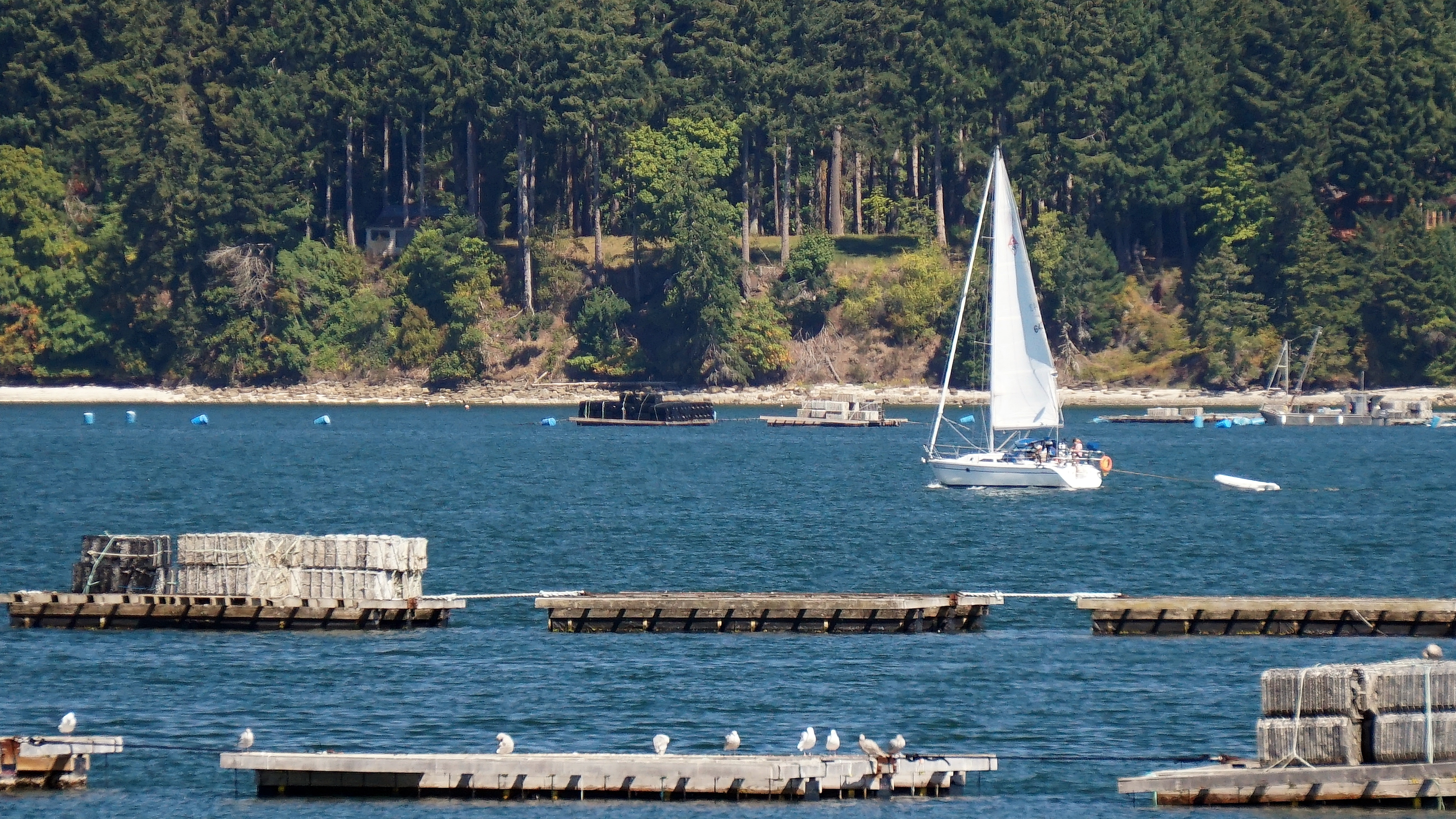
Oyster platforms, Union Bay, 2016.

In 1962, the 100-ton community hall was moved from the shoreline across the highway to the present location, once the site of a small Chinatown. By this time, offering the 200 inhabitants few job opportunities, Union Bay was considered a lifeless place counting on a pulp and paper mill proposal, one of a series of industrial projects that never eventuated.

The UBID assumed responsibility for fire protection and street lighting in 1972.

Nowadays, the former heavy industry has given way to the aquaculture sector, mainly harvesting oysters. The location is a popular retirement community. The main street features a boat launch, coffee shop, market/café, and heritage buildings.

In 2020, Union Bay Estates (UBE), formerly known as Kensington Island Properties, broke ground at Hart Creek on a new subdivision to house at least 7,000 people (3,000 residences), with a proposed marina, hotels, and commercial district. The project had been on-again and off-again for more than 20 years. In the 1990s, the company had bought the land from Weldwood, which had extensively logged in the general area.

A sales office/café/deli will feature images of the coal port history on the building exterior. The risk that toxic heavy metals, buried during the coal port era, could be released, contaminating the marine ecosystem of the Baynes Sound area, makes the development of a marina problematic.

The government includes the Union Bay coal hills among the priority contaminated sites in BC. In 2017, UBE disposed of 28 acres of contaminated land to the government for $1. West Fraser Timber, the lessee, and the BC government, are carrying out remediation work on local coal hills.

A 2020 referendum gave rise to the dissolution of the UBID, with governance assumed by the Comox Valley Regional District.
