= Pentlatch language =

Salishan language

Pentlatch
- Pənƛ’áč
- Native to: Canada
- Region: Vancouver Island
- Ethnicity: Pentlatch people
- Extinct: 1944; 2 semispeakers (2023)
- Revival: began 2017, declared living by 2023
- Language family: Salish: Coast Salish; Central; Pentlatch

Language codes
- ISO 639-3: ptw
- Glottolog: pent1242
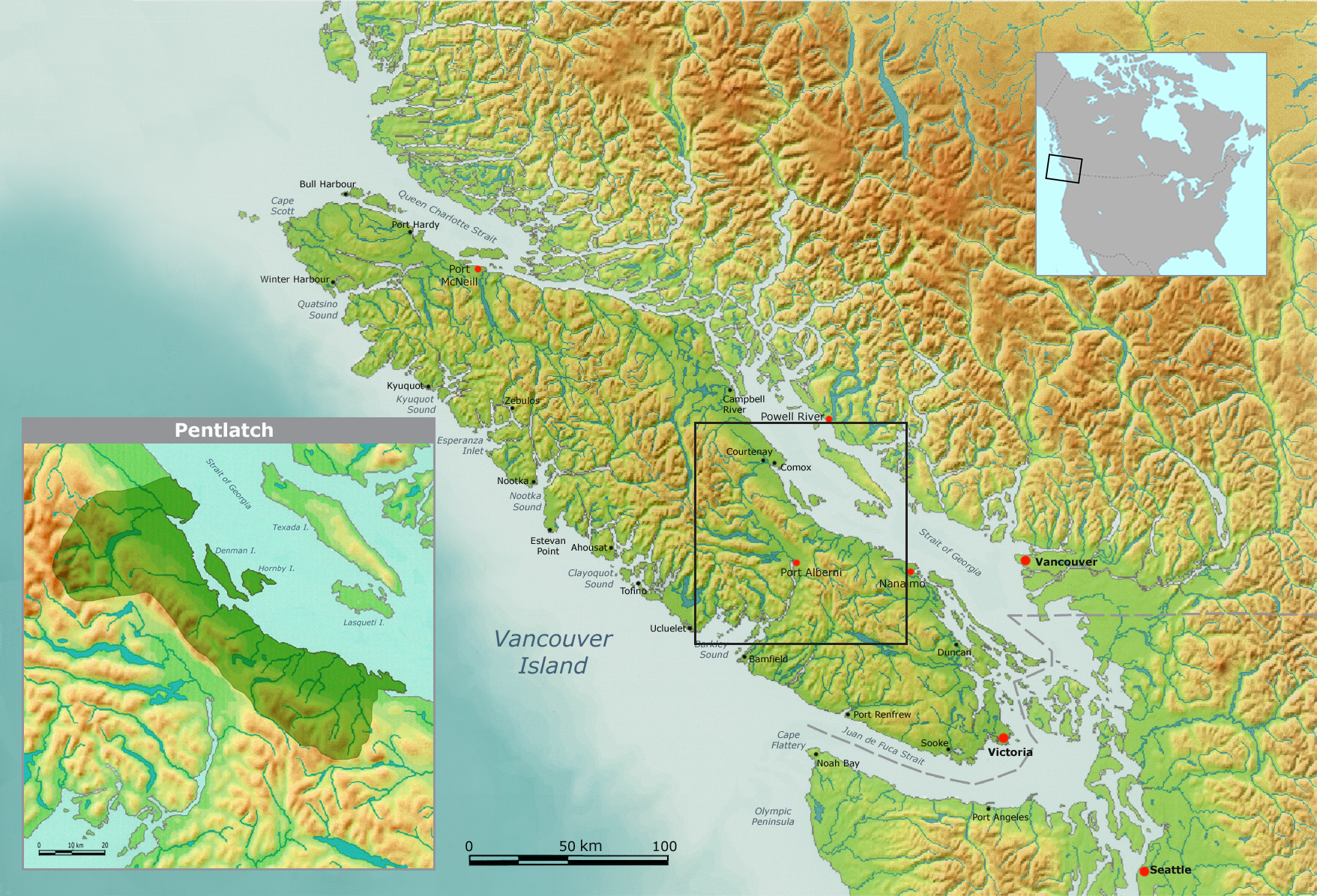

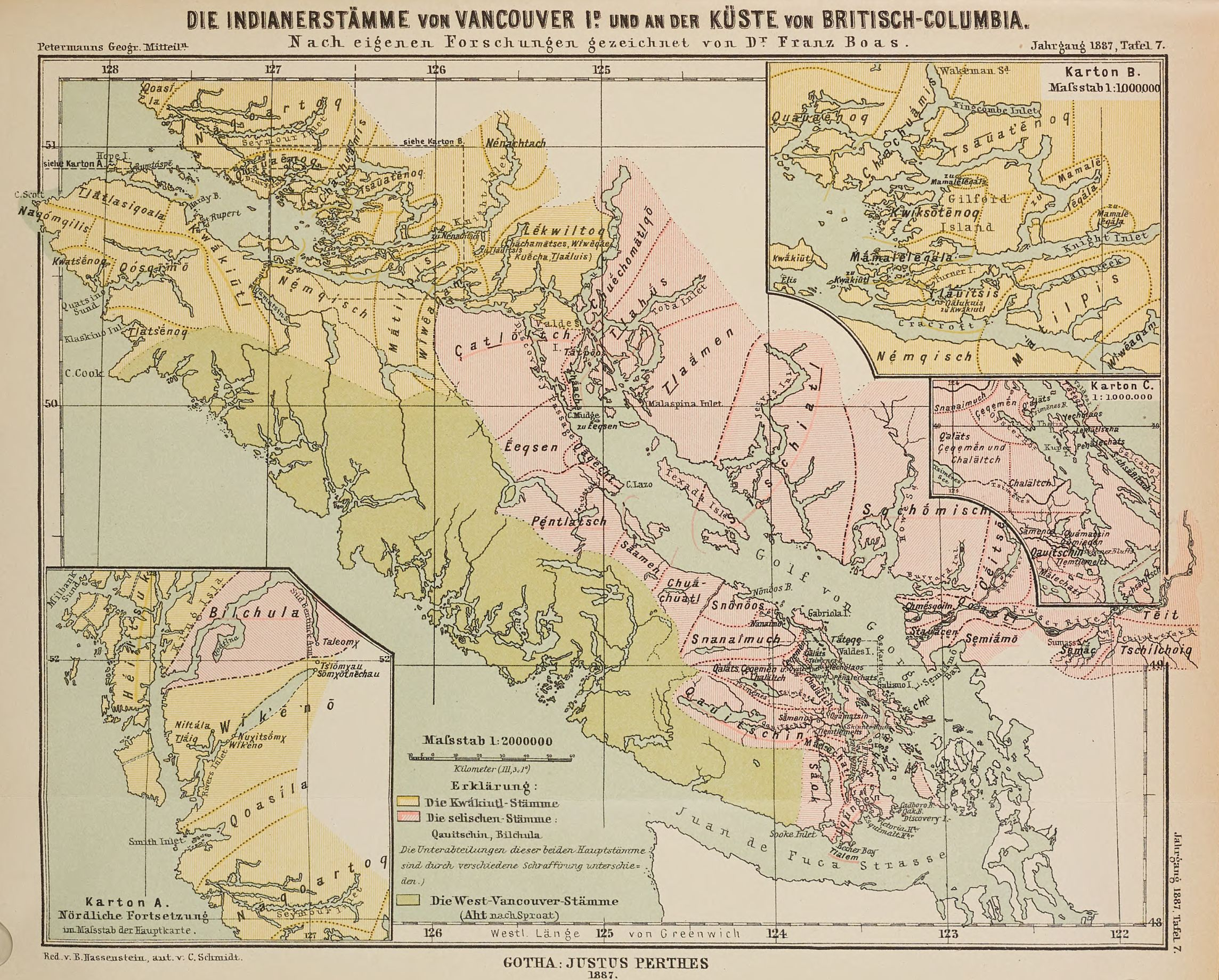
Dr. Franz Boas 1887 map showing Pentlatch language speaking territories

The Pentlatch, Pentl’ach, Puntlatch, Puntlatsh or Puntledge language is a Salishan language that is spoken on Canada's Vancouver Island in a small area between Comox and Nanaimo, British Columbia. The Pentlatch people formerly numbered at least 3,000 with at least 90 settlements in the area. The language became extinct after the death of the last fluent speaker Joe Nim Nim in 1940, but researchers from Qualicum First Nation declared it to be a living language in December 2023. There are currently two semispeakers of Pentlach, and 20 people are learning it.

In 2017, Qualicum Elder Bill Recalma, a silent speaker of Pentlatch, began working to record and teach what he knew of the language. He and his son Jessie have been working together to help revive it. The Pentlatch celebrated a ceremony celebrating the language's reawakening due to their efforts. In 2023, the Pentlatch language was reclassified by Qualicum researchers as a living language and was added to the list of official First Nations' languages in British Columbia.

== Variants ==
The name of this people and their language survives on the modern map as that of the Puntledge River, the Comox Valley locality of Puntledge and the name of the Pentledge 2 Indian Reserve, now allocated to the K'ómoks First Nation band government.

== History ==
The Pentlatch, Pentl’ach, Puntlatch, Puntlatsh or Puntledge language is a Salishan language that is spoken on Canada's Vancouver Island in a small area between Comox and Nanaimo, British Columbia. The name of this people and their language survives on the modern map as that of the Puntledge River, the Comox Valley locality of Puntledge, and the Pentledge 2 Indian Reserve, which is now allocated to the K'ómoks First Nation band government.

The Pentlatch people formerly numbered at least 3,000 with at least 90 settlements in the area, and had three distinct dialect regions. The Pentlatch language shares cognates with several neighboring languages, including Squamish, Sechelt, and Halkomelem. The language became extinct or "sleeping" after the death of its last fluent speaker Joe Nim Nim in 1940, but recent research efforts beginning in 2017 have led it to be re-classified as a living or "reawakening" language since 2023.

== Revitalization Efforts ==
Student-led research in collaboration with descendants of Pentlatch speakers at the University of Victoria have been working to reconstruct the Pentlatch language. The main resource the researchers have in the original Pentlatch language comes from the anthropologist Franz Boas' trip to the Vancouver region in 1886. His transcriptions of vocabulary and short stories, along with cognates in neighboring Salishan languages, have given the University of Victoria researchers a sound basis in the grammar and phonology of Pentlatch.

Members of the Qualicum First Nation have also created a website to promote their revitalization efforts, including information about their goals and some basic information about the language. One of their stated goals of the research is government recognition of the language as reawakening by Canadian governmental institutions.
