= Courtenay River =

Coordinates: 49°40′49″N 124°58′31″W

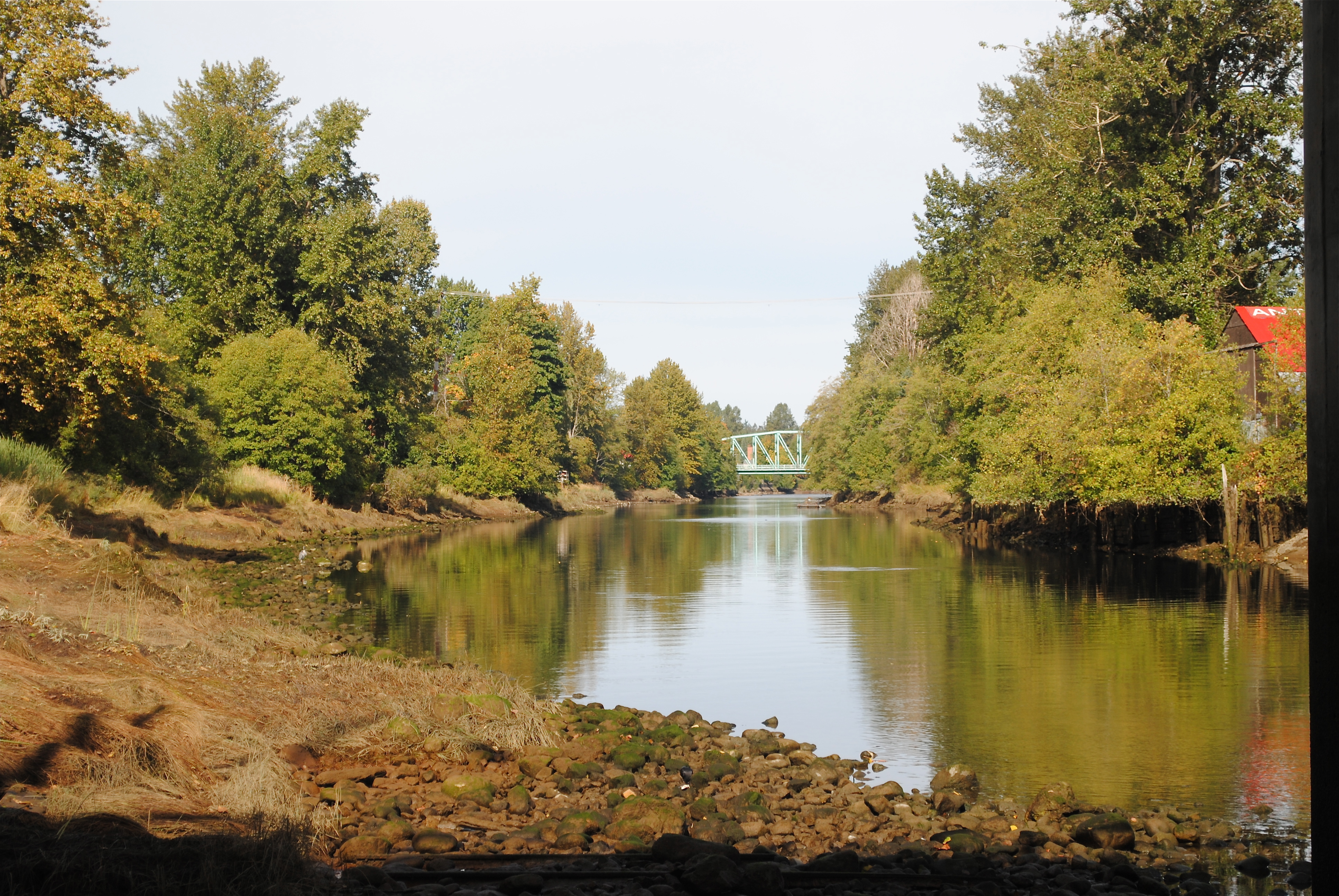
Courtenay River

The Courtenay River is a short river on Vancouver Island, British Columbia, Canada, being the name of the channel from the confluence of the Puntledge and Tsolum Rivers, in the City of Courtenay, and its outlet into Comox Harbour, which is a part of the Strait of Georgia.

== Name origin ==
The name was officially adopted in 1922, based on an 1865 British Admiralty chart. It was named after Captain (later Rear Admiral) George William Courtenay of HMS Constance.

== See also ==
- List of rivers of British Columbia
