= Tsolum River =

Coordinates: 49°41′45″N 124°59′39″W

The Tsolum River is a short river on Vancouver Island, British Columbia, Canada. Its mainstem is approximately 40 kilometers long, draining the north side of Mount Washington and the floodplain from Courtenay to Black Creek. It joins the Puntledge River to form the Courtenay River near the City of Courtenay.

The Tsolum River Watershed contains Wolf Lake, Regan Lake, Blue Grouse Lake and Helldiver Lake. Notable tributaries of the Tsolum include Murex Creek, Headquarters Creek, Dove Creek and Portuguese Creek. The Tsolum Watershed is the traditional land of the people of the Kʼómoks First Nation.

The Tsolum river is licensed for domestic and irrigation water supply. It is also a site for recreation, including fishing and swimming. Historically, the Tsolum supported significant fish populations, including steelhead and rainbow trout, cutthroat trout, and coho, pink and chum salmon, although such populations have declined to near zero.

== Name origin ==
Originally identified on Admiralty charts as "River Courtenay" and given as "Courtney River" by Dr. Robert Brown of the Vancouver Island Exploring Expedition, and as "the Slough known as Tsalum", it first appeared as the Tzolum River on a BC Lands map in 1895, and again in 1905. The name Tsolum River was made official in 1922.

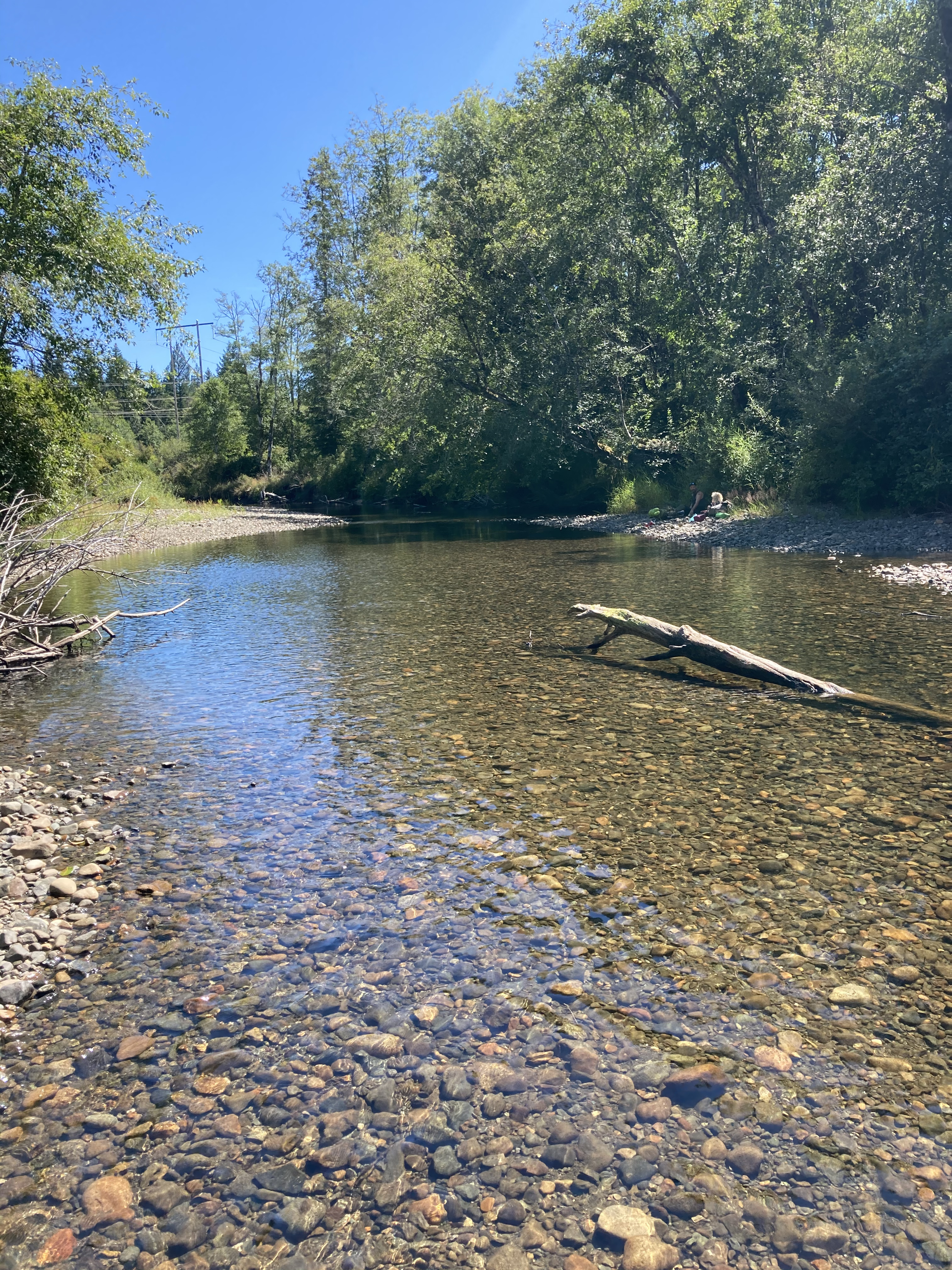
The Tsolum River

== Loss of biodiversity ==
From 1964-1967, the Mount Washington Copper Mining Co. operated a small open pit copper mine near the summit of Mount Washington, excavating 940,000 tonnes of waste rock and 360,000 tonnes of ore. By 1984, BC's Ministry of Environment had become aware of water quality problems created by acid drainage from the abandoned mine, including dissolved metals from the ore and waste rock. The acid drainage flows into Pyrrhotite and McKay creeks, which flow into Murex Creek, and from there into the Tsolum and Courtenay rivers. Such toxins (particularly copper) pose a risk to aquatic life in the river, including salmonids (although other factors such as irrigation withdrawals, overfishing, logging and gravel extraction also play a role). What was once a river that was sprawling with 15,000 Coho Salmon had depleted to only 14 by 1984.

In 1997 the Tsolum River Task Force was formed by over 200 local residents with the goal of restoring Tsolum River's health and productivity. Its successor, the Tsolum River Restoration Society, seeks to restore and maintain the ecological features of the Tsolum River watershed. Significant remediation work, involving community groups, various levels of government, and other stakeholders, has resulted in notable recoveries in salmonid stocks in the Tsolum.

== See also ==
- List of rivers of British Columbia
