= Comanagement in Canada =

Co-management, also known as community-based management, community-based resource management, cooperative management, joint management, and collaborative management, in the broadest terms refers to the administration of a particular place or resource being shared between multiple local and state management systems. Although co-management encompasses a spectrum of power-sharing arrangements, in the Canadian context it typically refers to agreements between government agencies and representatives of Indigenous peoples in Canada to jointly make land use and resource management decisions about a tract of government-controlled land (e.g. protected areas) or resource (e.g.fishery.).

Co-management has come to mean institutional arrangements whereby governments and Aboriginal entities (and sometimes other parties) enter into formal agreements specifying their respective rights, powers and obligations with reference to the management and allocation of resources in a particular area of crown lands and waters.

— Royal Commission on Aboriginal Peoples, 1997

Co-management arrangements in Canada between Crown governments and Indigenous groups have historically arisen out of comprehensive land claims settlements (modern treaties), crisis resolution processes (i.e. over resource disputes), and more recently out of growing legal recognition of Indigenous right through supreme court jurisprudence, such as the 1999 Sparrow ruling. Where Crown governments enter into co-management agreements to minimize management costs or uphold human rights commitments, such Canada's endorsement of the United Nations' Declaration on the Rights of Indigenous Peoples, Indigenous groups leverage co-management strategically as a tool to advance their self-determination as distinct cultures and to reclaim political agency. Historically, co-management has been a subject of debate. From one stance, co-management is viewed as a paternalistic administrative arrangement levied by the state that reifies colonial relationships by co-opting Indigenous peoples, excludes Indigenous forms of law and governance, and/or displaces Indigenous assertions of sovereignty. In nearly all co-management agreements, the Minister maintains unfettered veto rights, which is a source of contention among critics of co-management. Proponents of co-management highlight its utility as an adaptive platform by which Indigenous peoples can assert their sovereignty and jurisdiction, and engage in power-sharing arrangements with the state. Indigenous perspectives on co-management have been under represented in studies on co-management and critiques against co-management erroneously reduce Indigenous peoples to subjects without agency or the capacity to politically organize.

== Land claims based fish and wildlife co-management arrangements ==
There are 26 land claim settlements in Canada to date and each modern treaty has provisions for fish and wildlife co-management. Co-management arrangements created from these legally negotiated agreements may be referred to as land claims based co-management. An example of one such arrangement is the Nunavut Wildlife Management Board (NWMB). These agreements offer some advantages because they are constitutionally protected in Canada and outline clear roles and responsibilities for parties to the agreements.

== Co-management of Protected Areas in Canada ==
Canada's earliest national parks, intended for tourism and resource protection, notoriously excluded and displaced Indigenous peoples from their boundaries. Over the 20th century, there were several events and transformations in Canadian politics and within Parks Canada Agency that have led to improved engagement and relations with Indigenous peoples across their system. One of the most significant advancements for Indigenous-state relationships was the 1975 Comprehensive Land Claim Policy out of which many national parks were established, as described below. Soon thereafter, Justice Berger's 1977 Mackenzie Valley pipeline inquiry led Parks Canada in 1979 to recognize "the potential for joint management [of parks] with Aboriginal peoples" and to sustain the local Indigenous community's ability to continue traditional activities on the land. In the 1990s, Parks Canada Agency finally restructured many of its internal policies to allow for Indigenous peoples to continue some traditional activities and then introduced National Park Reserves (national parks "to-be" pending land claim settlements) into the Canada National Parks Act.

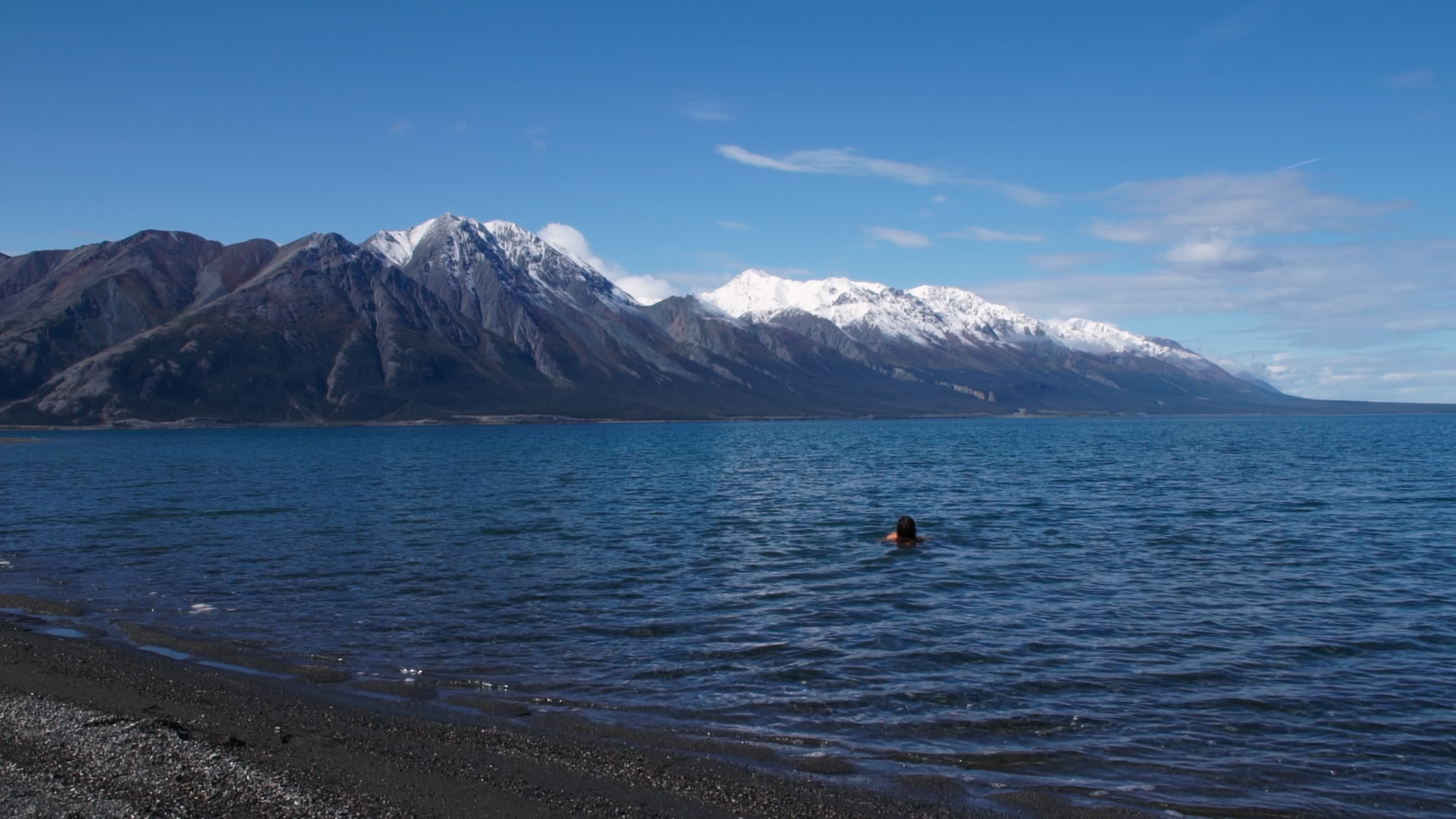
Kluane National Park and Reserve is co-managed by Kluane First Nation, Champage-Aishihik First Nation, and the Canadian Government.

Parks Canada co-manages many of its protected areas with local Indigenous peoples as the direct result of comprehensive land claims agreements. The first of these, Ivvavik National Park, in the Yukon and Inuvialuit Settlement Region, is under co-management as a result of provisions included in the 1984 Inuvialuit Final Agreement. Likewise, the Labrador Inuit Land Claims Agreement established a cooperative management board that would administer the Torngat Mountains National Park in Labrador, created in 2005. In certain cases, such as in the Thaidene Nëné National Park Reserve in the Northwest Territories and Łutsël K'é Dene territory, other types of protected areas (e.g. Territorial Protected Areas) have been established in conjunction with national parks. These collaborative projects are often initiated by Indigenous partners. In contrast to the Northern context, Southern Canada, where socio-political complexities relating to treaty context and jurisdictional overlap abound, agreement-making between Indigenous groups and Parks Canada Agency and Indigenous engagement in general is less consistent. Many of these Southern Parks are witnessing changes in the way the state engages with its Indigenous partners as a result of the Parks Canada Agency's policy development.

Provincial and territorial protected areas also utilize co-management arrangements for their administration. Similar to the federal context, these are frequently a result of provincial land claim settlements, mostly notably in Western and Northern Canada. For example, the establishment of Thunderbird's Nest (T'iitsk'in Paawats) Protected Area in 2011, cooperatively managed between Uchucklesaht Tribe Government and PC Parks, was a stated provision within the Maa-nulth First Nations Final Agreement. A separate but related phenomenon is the joint management of parks by two governments without an Indigenous partner. For example, the federal government and a province can jointly manage a park such as the Saguenay–St. Lawrence Marine Park in Quebec, as can two provinces such as Cypress Hills Interprovincial Park in Alberta and Saskatchewan. Saysutshun (Newcastle Island Marine) Park has been co-managed through a tri-partite agreement between BC Parks, the City of Nanaimo, and Snuneymuxw First Nation since 2003.

== Co-management of Resources in Canada ==
The West Coast of Vancouver Island Aquatic Management Board is an example of co-management in fisheries. It consists of two members appointed by each of the Government of Canada, province of British Columbia, the Nuu-chah-nulth Tribal Council, the regional districts, as well as eight non-government members jointly appointed by the levels of government from the wider community.

In addition to park establishment, modern land claim agreements mandate the creation of co-management agreements or management entities that concern resource management, such as the Wildlife Management Advisory Council (North Slope) in the Inuvialuit Final Agreement. Comprehensive land claims of Yukon First Nations include the creation of local resource management bodies called Renewable Resource Councils, some of which serve as management entities on co-management boards themselves.

Resource crises have also spawned the creation of co-management boards. A well-studied example is the defunct Ruby Range Sheep Steering Committee established in 1995 to assess Dall Sheep population dynamics in Southwest Yukon. The committee was composed of representatives from local Indigenous communities, territorial and federal governments, local outfitters, and environmental organizations and was responsible for advising the Yukon Fish and Wildlife Management Board on decisions relating to the sheep herd.
