= Bewlay Lake =

- Location within Vancouver Island
- Location: Vancouver Island, British Columbia
- Coordinates: 48°54′00″N 124°54′00″W
- Lake type: Natural lake
- Basin countries: Canada

Bewlay Lake is a lake located on Vancouver Island south of west end of Sarita Lake and east of Bamfield.

== See also ==
- List of lakes of British Columbia
