= Puntledge River =

River in Canada

Coordinates: 49°41′45″N 124°59′41″W

The Puntledge River is a river within the Comox-Strathcona Regional District on the east side of Vancouver Island, British Columbia, Canada. From its source, the Puntledge flows roughly east, through Forbush Lake and Willemar Lake, then north into Comox Lake. From Comox Lake, the River flows through the Comox Dam, and joins the Tsolum River to form the Courtenay River, which in turn enters the Strait of Georgia at the city of Courtenay. Notable tributaries include Supply Creek, Browns River, and Morrison Creek. The river is home to several recreation sites, including the Comox Lake Dam Picnic Area and Nymph Falls Regional Park.

The Puntledge (and its source, Comox Lake) is and has been a source of hydroelectric power for local industry and residents of nearby communities. BC Hydro operates the Puntledge Generating Station (also known as the Puntledge River Powerhouse), with a generating capacity of 24 MW. Comox Dam provides flow regulation for the generation facility.

== Name origin ==
The name is derived from that of the Pentlatch people. Their language, also called Pentlatch, was a Coast Salish language. The river was officially named by Robert Brown of the Vancouver Island Exploring Expedition in 1854, after the people who lived along it, although Lieut. Mayne of the Royal Engineers had noted the name Puntluch River.

== See also ==
- List of rivers of British Columbia
