= Sarita River =

River in British Columbia, Canada

- Location of river mouth

Location
- Country: Canada
- Province: British Columbia

Physical characteristics
- Mouth
  - location: Numukamis Bay, Barkley Sound
  - coordinates: 48°53′58″N 125°00′33″W
  - elevation: 0 m (0 ft)
- Length: 25 km (16 mi)
- Basin size: 190 km^{2} (73 mi^{2})

Basin features
- Tributaries
  - left: South Sarita River

The Sarita River is an approximately 25 km (16 mi)-long river on the west coast of Vancouver Island, British Columbia, Canada, just north of the hamlet of Bamfield.

== History ==
The Sarita River basin is the traditional homeland of the Huu-ay-aht Peoples. The river was important to the Huu-ay-aht for thousands of years as a source of food and as a means of transportation between villages throughout the territory. The Huu-ay-aht wintering village, Nuumakimyiis, was located at the mouth of the river. In the twentieth century, logging through the Sarita River watershed has reduced habitat and resulted in damage to the river ecosystem. By 1997, 62% of the watershed had been logged.

In 2018, the Huu-ay-aht First Nations announced plans to begin a salmon renewal program to bring back the important food staple to the Sarita River.

On October 19, 2024, the Sarita River flooded due to an atmospheric river, part of the 2024 British Columbia floods. The road to Bamfield washed out, killing two people.

== River course ==
The river has its source in the mountainous interior of Vancouver Island, not far from the Nitinat River basin. The river flows westerly into Sarita Lake and empties the lake over Sarita Falls before meandering through a lowland valley towards the ocean at Numukamis Bay on the eastern edge of the Barkley Sound. The Sarita River has a braided river mouth with a number of distributaries. The main tributary for the Sarita River is the South Sarita River. The South Sarita River starts south-west of the Sarita River in the Somerset Range. It flows north-east and meets the Sarita River west of Sarita Lake.

The Bamfield Road, the main road to Bamfield, follows the middle course of the Sarita River valley.

== See also ==
- List of rivers of British Columbia
