= Kim Lake =

Lake in British Columbia, Canada

- Location within Vancouver Island
- Location: Vancouver Island, British Columbia
- Coordinates: 49°32′00″N 125°04′00″W
- Lake type: Natural lake
- Basin countries: Canada

Kim Lake is a lake located on Vancouver Island east of Tsable Lake, south of Cumberland.

== See also ==
- List of lakes of British Columbia
