= Kʼómoks First Nation =

Band government of the Kʼómoks

Kʼómoks First Nation (KFN) is a band government of the Kʼómoks people of Vancouver Island, British Columbia, Canada. Though the KFN is generally considered a Coast Salish group, there has been strong Kwakwaka'wakw influence, especially since the Laich-kwil-tach expansion and the amalgamation of the Hahamatsees/Walitsma tribe into the band in 1940. Many members of KFN maintain strong bonds with the Wei Wai Kai and Wei Wai Kum.

KFN consists of historically they were a Coast Salish people since integrated into Kwakwakaʼwakw society. Originally part of the Laich-kwil-tach Council of Chiefs, which is a treaty society, they are now negotiating independently in the BC Treaty Process. They remain a member government of the Kwakiutl District Council (a tribal council).

== Demographics ==
The Kʼómoks (Comox) First Nation has approximately 355 members.

== Current reserves ==
KFN had an extensive traditional territory.

KFN reserves are:

- Comox IR No. 7, in Comox District on the North shore of Comox Harbour on the East Coast of Vancouver Island, 58.9 ha. 49°40′59″N 124°57′04″W
- Goose Spit IR No. 3, on Goose Spit, Comox Harbour, in Comox Land District, 5.7 ha. 49°39′59″N 124°55′04″W
- Puntledge IR No. 2, on left bank of the Puntledge River, at mouth of the Tsolum River, at Courtenay, 83 ha. 49°41′59″N 125°00′04″W
- Salmon River (Kʼómoks) IR No. 1, at mouth of the Salmon River, on Johnstone Strait, Sayward Land District, 133 ha. 50°22′59″N 125°57′05″W

== See also ==
- Comox (language)
