= Ralph Lake =

- Location within Vancouver Island
- Location: Vancouver Island, British Columbia
- Coordinates: 49°39′00″N 125°28′00″W
- Lake type: Natural lake
- Basin countries: Canada

Ralph Lake is a lake located on Vancouver Island. It is an expansion of the Ralph River east of Buttle Lake.

== See also ==
- List of lakes of British Columbia
