= Mount Washington (British Columbia) =

Mountain in British Columbia, Canada

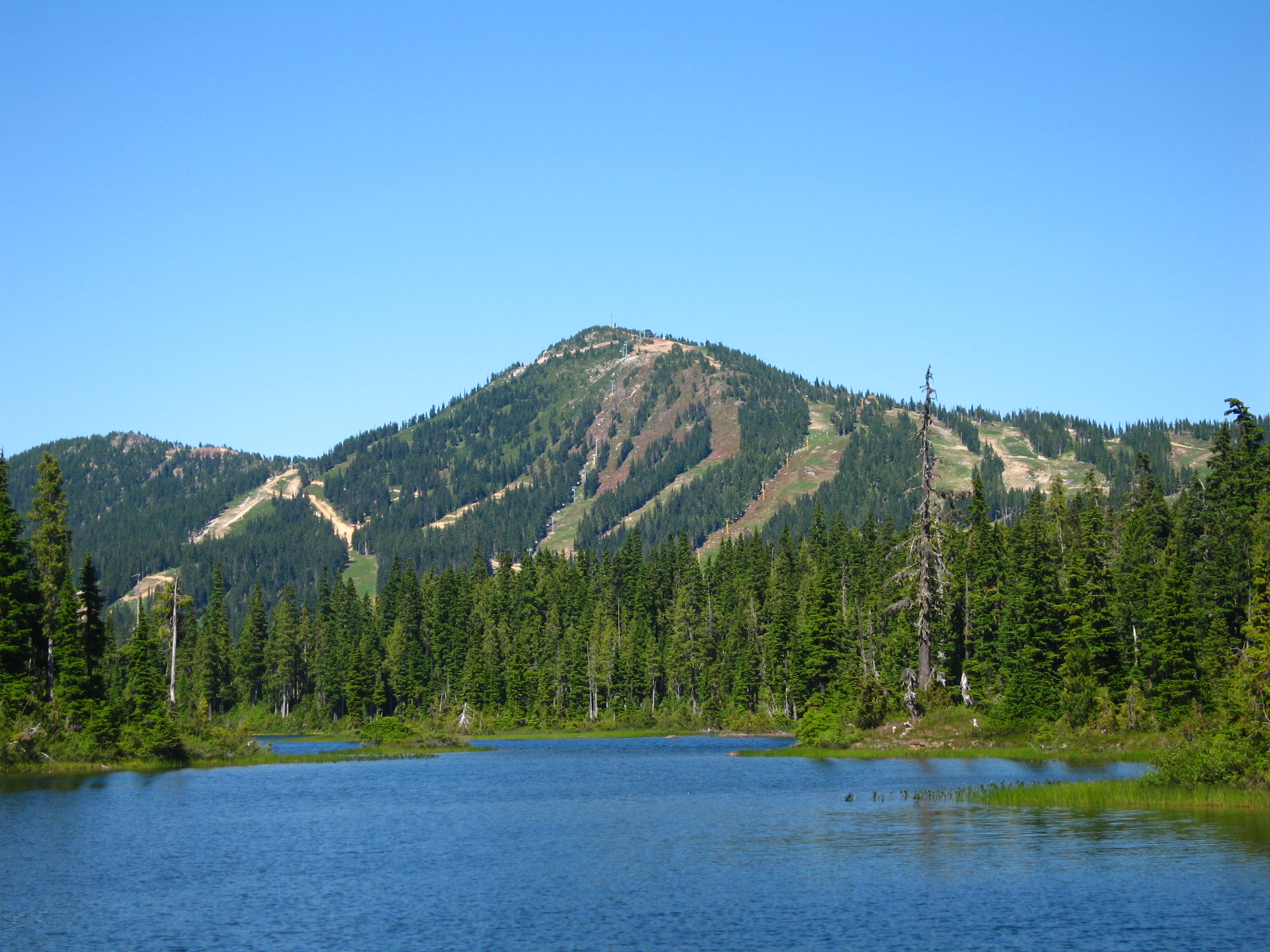
- Mount Washington in the Summer

Highest point
- Elevation: 1,588 m (5,210 ft)
- Prominence: 510 m (1,670 ft)
- Coordinates: 49°45′11″N 125°17′47″W

Geography
- Location within Vancouver Island Location within British Columbia
- Interactive map of Mount Washington
- Location: Vancouver Island, BC, Canada
- District: Comox Land District
- Parent range: Vancouver Island Ranges
- Topo map: NTS 92F14 Oyster River

Mount Washington is a mountain on the eastern edge of the Vancouver Island Ranges of British Columbia. It is located approximately 25 kilometres (16 mi) from the Comox Valley.

The mountain was named after Rear Admiral John Washington, official Hydrographer, British Royal Navy, by Captain George Richards while charting the West Coast in the 1860s.

Mount Washington is the site of Mount Washington Alpine Resort, popular for skiing and many other activities. In addition to winter skiing, in the summer Mount Washington has many trails for mountain bikers, and offers scenic chair lifts and hiking trails to visitors.

== Wildlife ==
Mount Washington is home to the Vancouver Island marmot, an endangered mammal. Found in the wild only on Vancouver Island in British Columbia, the marmot differs significantly from other marmot species. In an effort to increase Vancouver Island marmot populations, the Vancouver Island Marmot Recovery Foundation has established captive breeding facilities across Canada. The largest of these is the Tony Barrett Marmot Recovery Centre located on Mount Washington.

== Mt. Washington Copper Mine ==
From 1964–1967, the Mount Washington Copper Mining Company operated a small open pit copper mine near the summit of Mount Washington, excavating 940,000 tonnes of waste rock and 360,000 tonnes of ore. Decades later, water quality problems attributable to dissolved metals from ore and waste rock were identified in the Tsolum River and its tributaries, particularly Pyrrhotite and McKay Creeks. Provincial authorities determined in 1986 that copper leaching from the mine had virtually eliminated salmonid fish populations in the Tsolum River Watershed. Significant remediation work followed this finding, involving community groups, various levels of government, and other stakeholders, have resulted in some recovery of salmonid stocks in the Tsolum River.

== Broadcasting Infrastructure ==
The following broadcasting stations have their transmitter sites on the east face of Mount Washington, facing out over the Comox Valley and Campbell River:

- CKLR-FM, 97.3 MHz
- CFCP-FM, 98.9 MHz
- CHAN-TV-4, channel 11

Several amateur radio repeaters are also located on Mount Washington.

== See also ==
- List of mountains of British Columbia
