= Beaufort Lake =

- Location within Vancouver Island
- Location: Vancouver Island, British Columbia
- Coordinates: 49°30′00″N 125°03′00″W
- Lake type: Natural lake
- Basin countries: Canada

Beaufort Lake is a small lake located south east of southern end of Comox Lake. This lake is a widening of Beaufort Creek, which in turn takes its name from the Beaufort Range.

== See also ==
- List of lakes of British Columbia
