= Comox Lake =

Lake in British Columbia, Canada

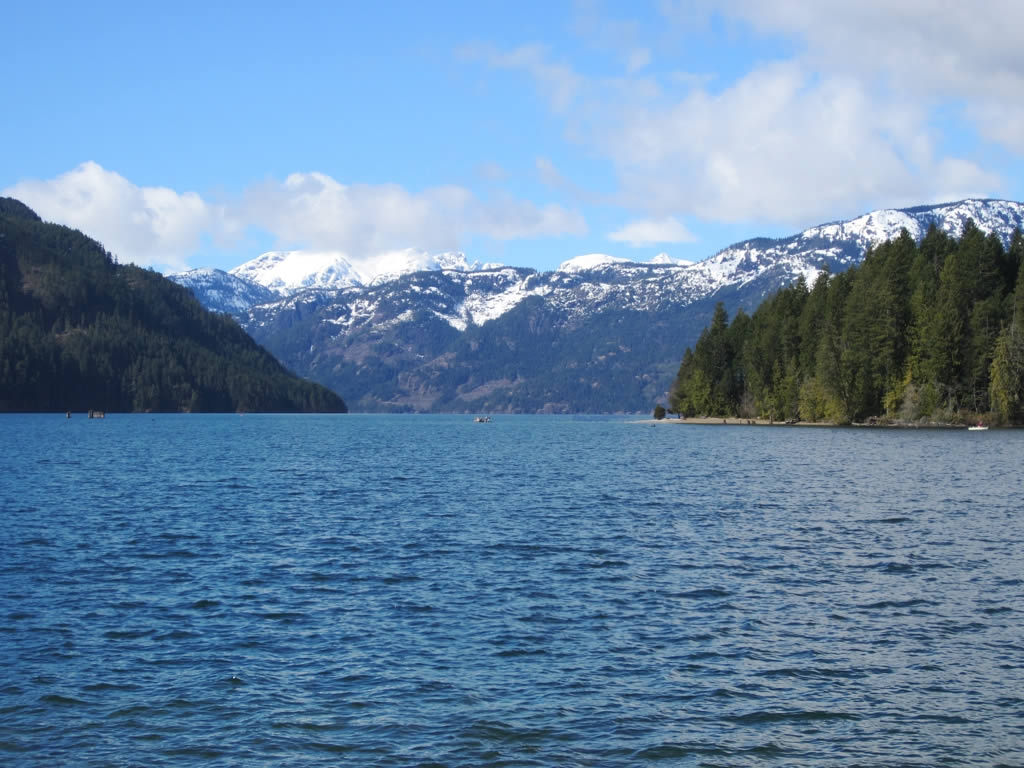

- Location within Vancouver Island
- Location: British Columbia
- Coordinates: 49°36′43″N 125°10′32″W
- Primary inflows: Puntledge River; Cruickshank River
- Primary outflows: Puntledge River
- Basin countries: Canada
- Surface area: 16.2 km^{2} (6.3 sq mi)
- Surface elevation: 142 m (466 ft)
- Settlements: Cumberland

Comox Lake is a glacier fed freshwater lake located in mid-Vancouver Island, British Columbia, Canada. It is located northwest of the smaller Beaufort Lake in the Comox Valley near Cumberland, British Columbia, and about 8km southwest of Courtenay. The lake is a reservoir for drinking water and for hydroelectric power.

Comox lake is well known for its surrounding hiking and bike trails.

== See also ==
- List of lakes of British Columbia
- Forbush Lake
