= Arum Lake =

- Location within Vancouver Island
- Location: Vancouver Island, British Columbia
- Coordinates: 49°32′06″N 125°04′12″W
- Lake type: Natural lake
- Basin countries: Canada

Arum Lake is a lake on Vancouver Island, Canada, south of the Tsable River and south of the town of Comox.

== See also ==
- List of lakes of British Columbia
