= Amedroz Lake =

- Location within Vancouver Island
- Location: Vancouver Island, British Columbia
- Coordinates: 49°01′01″N 125°12′42″W
- Lake type: Natural lake
- Basin countries: Canada

Amedroz Lake is a lake located on Vancouver Island south of Pipestem Inlet and west of Effingham Inlet.

== See also ==
- List of lakes of British Columbia
