= Globe Flower Lake =

- Location within Vancouver Island
- Location: Vancouver Island, British Columbia
- Coordinates: 49°41′00″N 125°37′00″W
- Lake type: Natural lake
- Basin countries: Canada

Globe Flower Lake is a lake on Vancouver Island west of Buttle Lake.

== See also ==
- List of lakes of British Columbia
