= Darlington Lake =

- Location within Vancouver Island
- Location: Vancouver Island, British Columbia
- Coordinates: 48°57′53.2″N 124°43′02.1″W
- Lake type: Natural lake
- Basin countries: Canada

Darlington Lake is a lake located on Vancouver Island south of Mount Grey.

== See also ==
- List of lakes of British Columbia
