= Angus Lake =

- Location within Vancouver Island
- Location: Vancouver Island, British Columbia
- Coordinates: 49°05′24″N 125°38′13″W
- Lake type: Natural lake
- Basin countries: Canada

Angus Lake is a lake located on Vancouver Island south of the Kennedy River below Kennedy Lake, east of the village of Ucluelet.

== See also ==
- List of lakes of British Columbia
