= Lake Beautiful =

- Location within Vancouver Island
- Location: Vancouver Island, British Columbia
- Coordinates: 49°41′00″N 125°20′00″W
- Lake type: Natural lake
- Basin countries: Canada

Lake Beautiful is a lake on Vancouver Island at the head of the Cruikshank River, on Forbidden Plateau in Strathcona Provincial Park.

== See also ==
- List of lakes of British Columbia
