= Hellebore Lake =

- Location within Vancouver Island
- Location: Vancouver Island, British Columbia
- Coordinates: 49°42′00″N 125°37′00″W
- Lake type: Natural lake
- Basin countries: Canada

Hellebore Lake is a lake on Vancouver Island which is the expansion of Marblerock Creek.

== See also ==
- List of lakes of British Columbia
