= Sarita Lake =

Lake in British Columbia, Canada

- Location within Vancouver Island
- Location: Vancouver Island, British Columbia
- Coordinates: 48°54′28″N 124°53′07″W
- Lake type: Natural lake
- Basin countries: Canada

Sarita Lake is a lake located on Vancouver Island an expansion of Sarita River and east of Numukamis Bay, Barkley Sound.

== See also ==
- List of lakes of British Columbia
