= Forbush Lake =

- Location within Vancouver Island
- Location: Vancouver Island, British Columbia
- Coordinates: 49°31′00″N 125°14′00″W
- Lake type: Natural lake
- Basin countries: Canada

Forbush Lake is a lake on Vancouver Island southwest of Comox Lake, Canada.

== See also ==
- List of lakes of British Columbia
