= West Coast of Vancouver Island Aquatic Management Board =

The West Coast Vancouver Island Aquatic Management Board is one of Canada's only co-management bodies for aquatic ecosystems. During the 1980s and 1990s, the federal government and coastal communities came to agree that a gap had to be closed; aquatic management decisions should start to include regional voices and representation, mainly coastal communities, fishermen, and First Nations.

== Roles and responsibilities ==
The board is a forum for the coastal communities and other persons and bodies affected by aquatic resource management off the West Coast. Through this forum they can participate more fully with governments in all aspects of management and provide recommendations to DFO. The board includes representatives from four levels of government, including the Nuu-chah-nulth First Nations. The board has been mandated to:

- be the primary forum on aquatic resource policy specific to the management area.
- deal with local aquatic resource policy issues with implications outside of the management area
- be a key source of advice to decision-makers on coast-wide aquatic resource policy relating to the management area.
- undertake integrated aquatic resource
- management responsibilities in the management area in cooperation with the relevant government agencies.

The board makes decisions and recommendations both on the conservation of aquatic resources and input on associated economic development opportunities.

== Structure ==
The board consists of:

- two members appointed by the Government of Canada
- two members appointed by the Province of British Columbia
- two members appointed by Nuu-chah-nulth Tribal Council
- two members appointed by the regional districts
- eight non-government members jointly appointed by the governments pursuant to nominations solicited from coastal communities and other persons and bodies affected by aquatic resource management in the management area (i.e. commercial harvesters, First Nation harvesters, recreational sector, aquaculture, conservation)

The geographic scope of the board corresponds with Nuu-chah-nulth Ha-houlthee, which extends seaward from Cape Cook on Brooks Peninsula to Solander Islands, to the international boundary along the entrance to Juan de Fuca Straits, then true north to Sheringham Point. Inland boundaries generally follow the height of land along watersheds dividing Vancouver Island.

Decisions are made by consensus.

== Administration ==
The executive director is Denise Dalmer. Co-chairs include Tom Pater and Tom Happynook

== Sources ==
- Sharmalene Mendis-Millard, "Central Region Governance", in Daniel Arbour, Brenda Kuecks & Danielle Edwards (editors). Ecotrust Canada.
- Nuu-chah-nulth Central Region First Nations Governance Structures 2007/2008, Vancouver, September 2008.
