= Vancouver Island =

Largest island in British Columbia, Canada

Nickname: The Island
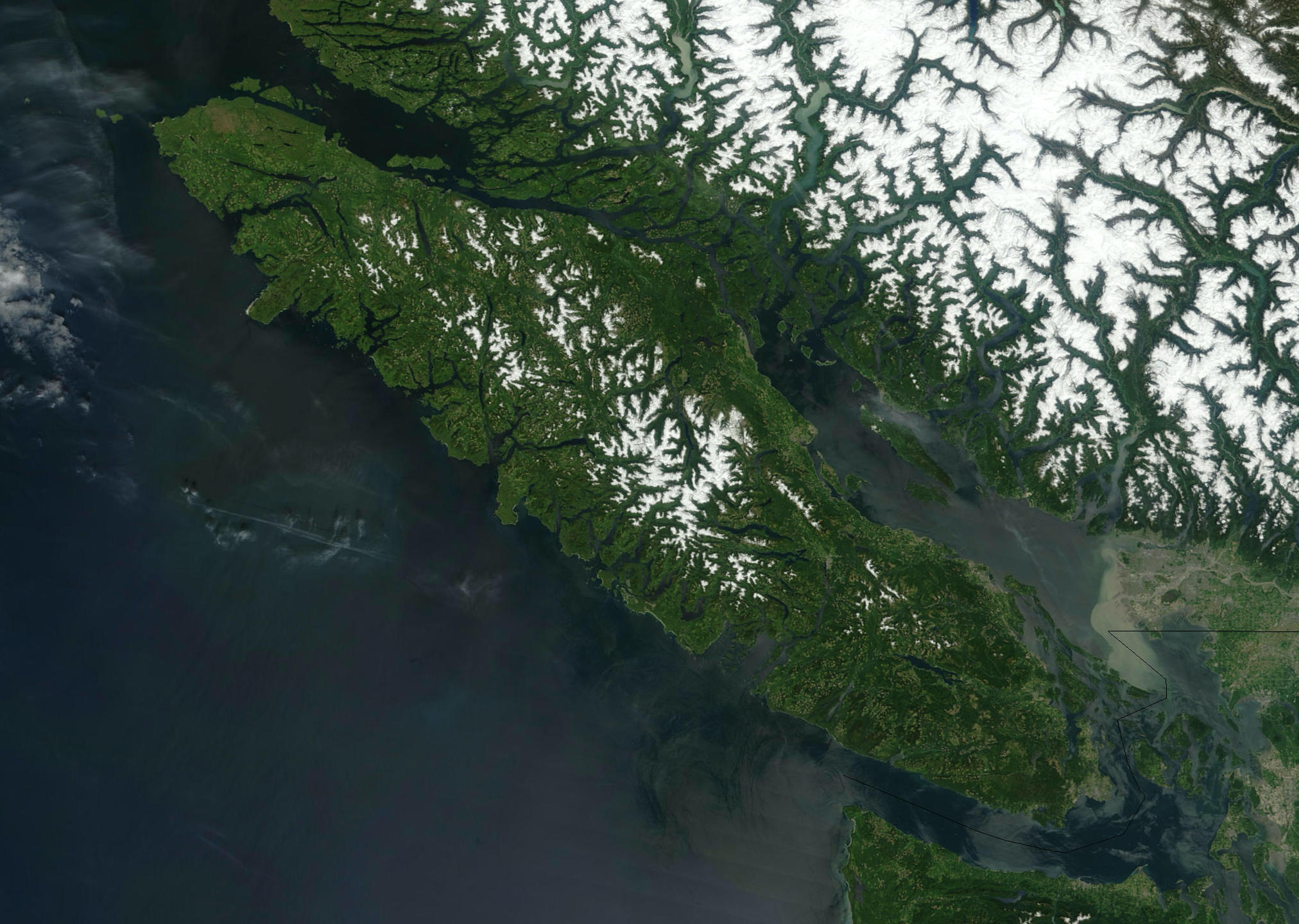
- Terra satellite image of Vancouver Island, 2003

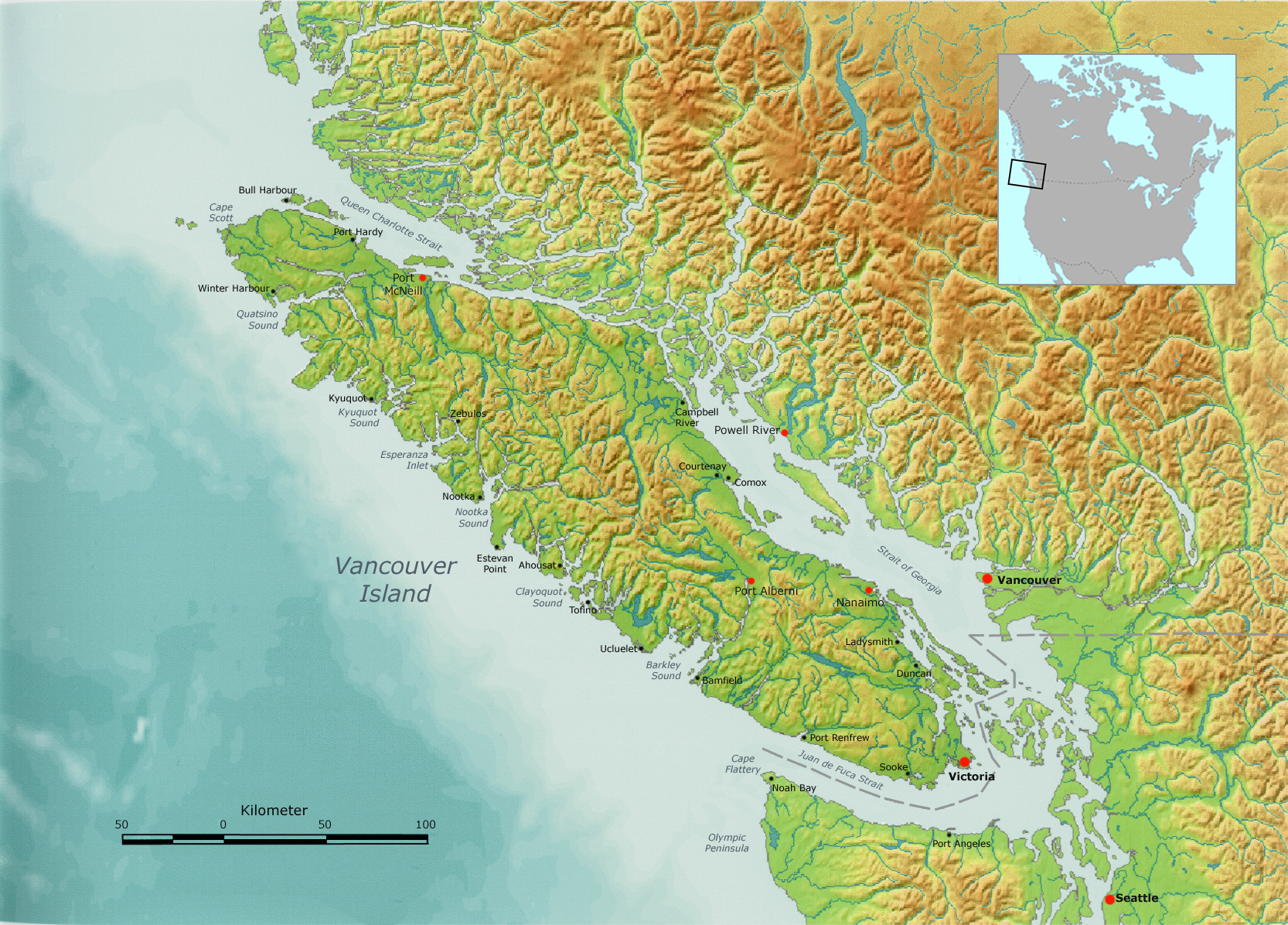
- Vancouver Island with major cities and towns labelled

Geography
- Location: North Pacific Ocean, on the coast of southern British Columbia
- Coordinates: 49.6°N 125.5°W
- Area: 31,815.31 km^{2} (12,283.96 sq mi) (2026)
- Area rank: 11th in Canada & 42nd worldwide
- Highest elevation: 2,195 m (7201 ft)
- Highest point: Golden Hinde

Administration
- Canada
- Province: British Columbia
- Largest settlement: Saanich (pop. 117,735, part of Greater Victoria, 397,237)

Demographics
- Demonym: Vancouver Islander
- Population: 864,864 (2021)
- Pop. density: 27.64/km^{2} (71.59/sq mi)

Vancouver Island is an island in the northeastern Pacific Ocean and part of the Canadian province of British Columbia. The island is 456 km (283 mi) in length, 100 km (62 mi) in width at its widest point, and, according to the United States Geological Survey, Esri, and the United Nations Environment Programme - World Conservation Monitoring Centre, is 31,815.31 km^{2} (12,283.96 sq mi) in total area. The island is the largest by area and the most populous along the west coasts of the Americas. The southern part of Vancouver Island and some of the nearby Gulf Islands are the only parts of British Columbia or Western Canada to lie south of the 49th parallel. The southeast part of the island has one of the warmest climates in Canada, and since the mid-1990s has been mild enough in a few areas to grow Mediterranean crops such as olives and lemons.

The population of Vancouver Island was 864,864 as of 2021. Nearly half of that population (~400,000) live in the metropolitan area of Greater Victoria on the southern tip of the island, which includes Victoria, the capital of British Columbia. Other notable cities and towns on Vancouver Island include Nanaimo, Campbell River, Courtenay, Port Alberni, and Parksville, all on or near the east coast. Indigenous peoples have inhabited Vancouver Island for thousands of years, long before the arrival of Spanish and British naval expeditions in the late 18th century.

The Spanish and British conjointly named it Quadra's and Vancouver's Island in commemoration of the friendly negotiations held in 1792 between the Spanish commander of Fort San Miguel in Nootka Sound, Juan Francisco de la Bodega y Quadra, and British naval captain George Vancouver, during the Nootka Crisis (but Bodega y Quadra's name was eventually dropped). It is one of several North American locations named after George Vancouver, who between 1791 and 1794 explored the Pacific Northwest. Vancouver Island is the world's 42nd largest island, Canada's 11th largest island, and Canada's second most populous island after Quebec's Island of Montreal.

== History ==
=== Indigenous peoples ===
Vancouver Island has been the homeland of many indigenous peoples for thousands of years. The groupings, by language, are the Kwakwakaʼwakw (also known as the Kwakiutl), Nuu-chah-nulth, and various Coast Salish peoples. While there is some overlap, Kwakwakaʼwakw territory includes northern and northwestern Vancouver Island and adjoining areas of the mainland, the Nuu-chah-nulth span most of the west coast, while the Coast Salish cover the southeastern Island and southernmost extremities along the Strait of Juan de Fuca. Their cultures are connected to the natural resources abundant in the area.

==== Kwakwakaʼwakw ====
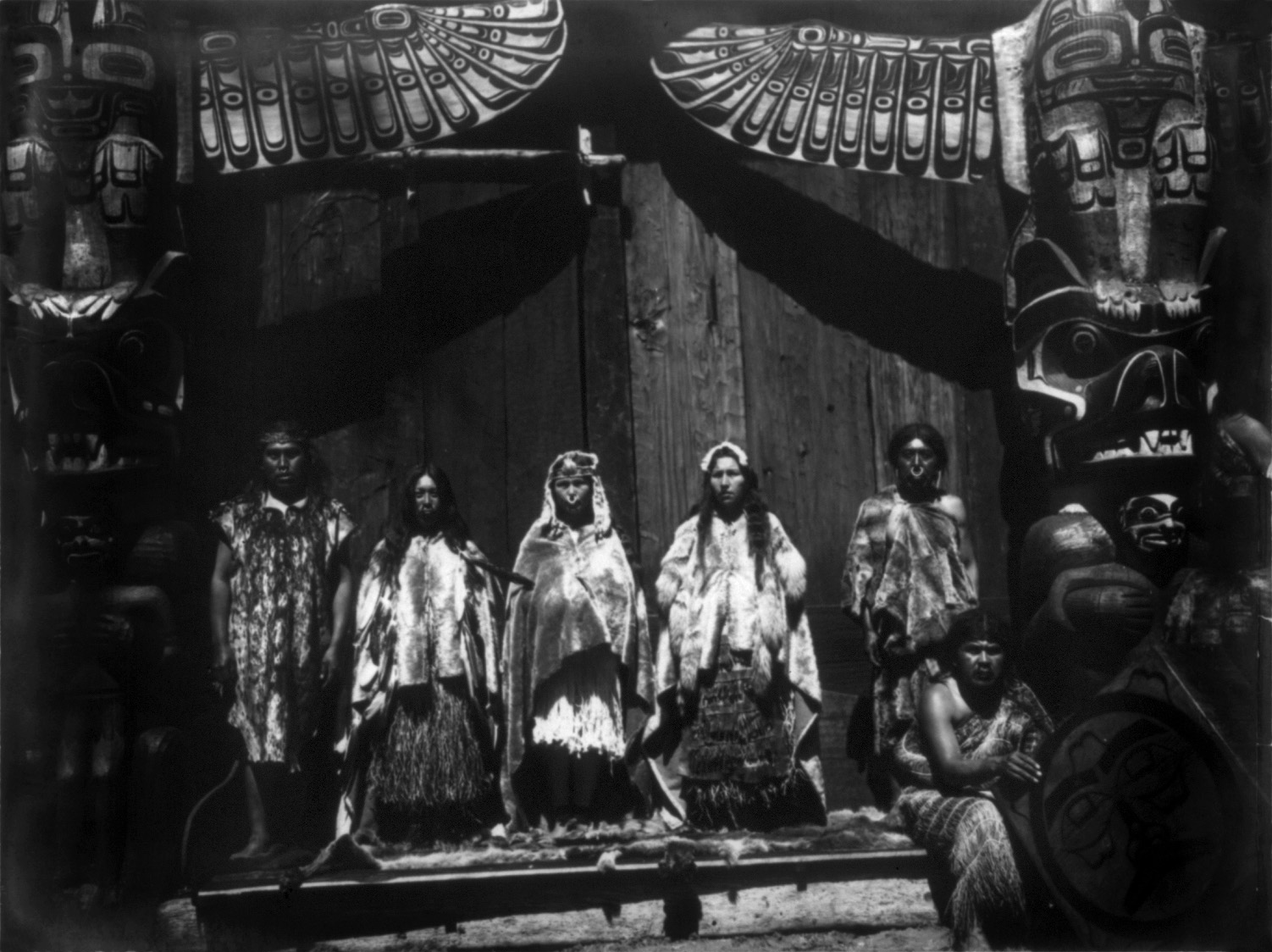
A Kwakwakaʼwakw wedding ceremony in 1914

The Kwakwakaʼwakw today number about 5,500, who live in British Columbia on northern Vancouver Island and the mainland. They are also known as Kwakiutl in English, from one of their tribes, but they prefer their autonym Kwakwakaʼwakw. Their indigenous language, part of the Wakashan family, is Kwakʼwala. The name Kwakwakaʼwakw means "speakers of Kwakʼwala". The language is now spoken by less than 5% of the population—about 250 people. Today, 17 separate tribes make up the Kwakwakaʼwakw. Some Kwakwakaʼwakw groups are now extinct. Kwakʼwala is a Northern Wakashan language, a grouping shared with Haisla, Heiltsuk and Wuikyala. Kwakwakaʼwakw centres of population on Vancouver Island include communities such as Fort Rupert, Alert Bay and Quatsino, the Kwakwakaʼwakw tradition of the potlatch was banned by the federal government of Canada in 1885, but has been revived in recent decades.

==== Nuu-chah-nulth ====
The Nuu-chah-nulth (pronounced [nuːʧanˀuɬ]), are indigenous peoples in Canada. Their traditional home is on the west coast of Vancouver Island. In pre-contact and early post-contact times, the number of nations was much greater, but as in the rest of the region, smallpox and other consequences of contact resulted in the disappearance of some groups and the absorption of others into neighbouring groups. They were among the first Pacific peoples north of California to come into contact with Europeans, as the Spanish, Americans and British attempted to secure control of the Pacific Northwest and the trade in otter pelts, with Nootka Sound becoming a focus of these rivalries. The Nuu-chah-nulth speak a Southern Wakashan language and are closely related to the Makah of the Olympic Peninsula, Washington state and the Ditidaht.

==== Coast Salish ====
The Coast Salish are the largest of the southern groups. They are a loose grouping of many tribes with numerous distinct cultures and historically speak one of the Coast Salish languages. On Vancouver Island, Coast Salish peoples' territory traditionally spans from the northern limit of the Strait of Georgia on the east side of Vancouver Island and covers most of southern Vancouver Island. Distinct nations within the Coast Salish peoples on Vancouver Island include the Stz'uminus, the Kʼómoks of the Comox Valley area, the Cowichan of the Cowichan Valley, the Esquimalt, the Saanich of the Saanich Peninsula, the Songhees of the Victoria area and the Snuneymuxw in the Nanaimo area.

=== European exploration ===
Europeans began to explore the island in 1774 when rumours of Russian fur traders caused Spain to send a number of expeditions to assert its long-held claims to the Pacific Northwest. The first expedition was that of the Santiago, under the command of Juan José Pérez Hernández. In 1775, a second Spanish expedition under the Spanish Peruvian captain Juan Francisco de la Bodega y Quadra was sent. By 1776, Spanish exploration had reached Bucareli Bay including the mouth of the Columbia River between Oregon and Washington, and Sitka Sound. Vancouver Island came to the attention of Britain after the third voyage of Captain James Cook, who spent a month during 1778 at Nootka Sound, on the island's western coast. Cook claimed it for Great Britain. Maritime fur trader, John Meares arrived in 1786 and set up a single-building trading post near the native village of Yuquot (Friendly Cove), at the entrance to Nootka Sound in 1788. The fur trade began expanding into the island, eventually leading to permanent settlement.

=== Dispute over sovereignty ===
The island was further explored by Spain in 1789 with Esteban José Martínez, who established the settlement of Yuquot and the artillery battery of Fort San Miguel at Friendly Cove, which Spain called Puerto de San Lorenzo de Nuca. This was to be the only Spanish settlement, as well as a whaling factory in Red Bay, Labrador, in what would later be Canada. Asserting their claim of exclusive sovereignty and navigation rights, the Spanish force seized the Portuguese-flagged British ships. British naval captain George Vancouver was sent to Nootka Sound in 1792 in order to negotiate a settlement. His Spanish counterpart in the negotiations was Juan Francisco de la Bodega y Quadra, who was commandant of Santa Cruz de Nuca in 1792. Vancouver had sailed as a midshipman with Cook. The negotiations between Vancouver and Bodega y Quadra ended in a deadlock with nothing resolved. Vancouver insisted the entire Spanish establishment be turned over, but Bodega y Quadra held that there were no buildings seized in 1789, and the only possible land was a tiny and useless cove nearby. The two decided to refer the entire matter back to their respective governments. The friendly meeting between Bodega y Quadra and Vancouver led the former to propose that the island be named after both: "Quadra and Vancouver Island", which became the original name. While we know this island today as "Vancouver Island", the British explorer had not intentionally meant to name such a large body of land solely after himself. In his September 1792 dispatch log report for the British Admiralty, Captain Vancouver reveals that his decision here was rather meant to honour a request by Bodega y Quadra that Vancouver:

would name some port or island after us both in commemoration of our meeting and friendly intercourse that on that occasion had taken place (Vancouver had previously feted Bodega y Quadra on his ship); ...and conceiving no place more eligible than the place of our meeting, I have therefore named this land ... The Island of Quadra and Vancouver.

Bodega y Quadra wrote, however, that it was Vancouver who made the suggestion of combining their names to designate some geographical feature.

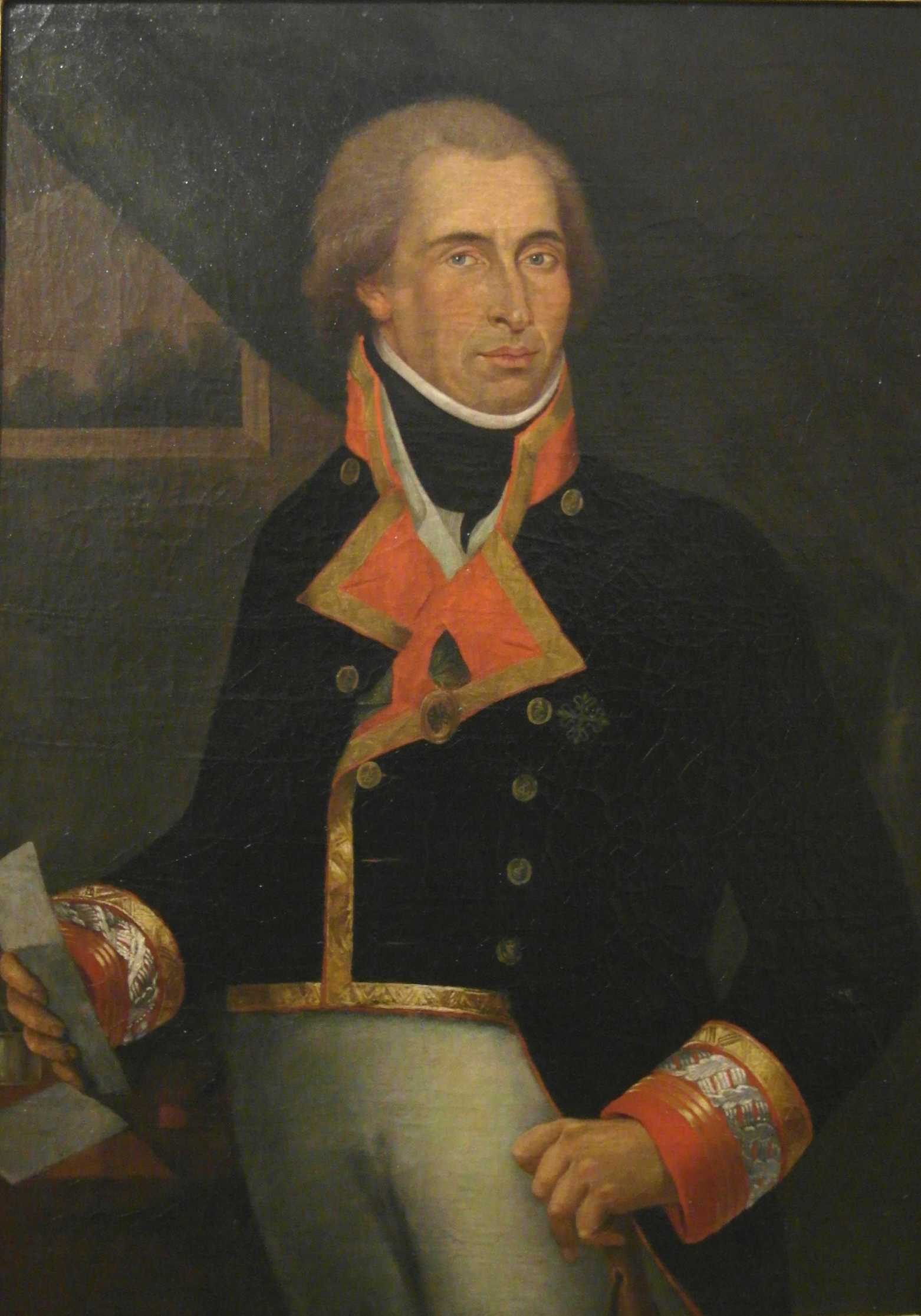
Dionisio Alcalá Galiano was the first European to circumnavigate Vancouver Island

In 1792, the Spanish explorer Dionisio Alcalá Galiano and his crew were the first Europeans to circumnavigate Vancouver Island. On 8 April 1806, Captain John D'Wolf of Bristol, Rhode Island, sailed the Juno to Nahwitti (Newettee), a small inlet in the northwestern promontory of Vancouver's Island. The captain described Newettee as one of the southernmost harbours frequented by American fur traders at 51 degrees north and 128 degrees west. He relates that since Captain Robert Gray of Tiverton, Rhode Island, had sailed the Columbia River in 1792, the trade of the northwest coast had been almost entirely in the hands of Boston merchants, so much so that the natives called all traders "Boston Men". A settlement was not successfully negotiated and ownership of the island remained in dispute between the Kingdom of Great Britain and the Spanish Empire in the early 1790s. The two countries nearly began a war over the issue; the confrontation became known as the Nootka Crisis. That was averted when both agreed to recognize the other's rights to the area in the first Nootka Convention in 1790, a first step to peace. Finally, the two countries signed the second Nootka Convention in 1793 and the third Convention in 1794. As per that final agreement, the Spanish dismantled their fort at Nootka and left the area, giving the British sovereignty over Vancouver Island and the adjoining islands (including the Gulf Islands). For decades, Quadra's and Vancouver's Island was the most prominent name on maps of the coast, and appeared on most British, French and Spanish maps of the period. But as Spanish interests in the region dwindled, so did the use of Bodega y Quadra's name. The Hudson's Bay Company played a major part in the transition; by 1824 'Vancouver's Island' had become the usual designation in its correspondence for the island. A quarter of a century later, Vancouver Island had become such a well-known geographical feature that the founding of the Colony of Vancouver Island in 1849 gave this name full official status. Period references to "Vancouver" referred to Vancouver Island until the naming of the city of Vancouver in 1885.

=== British settlement ===
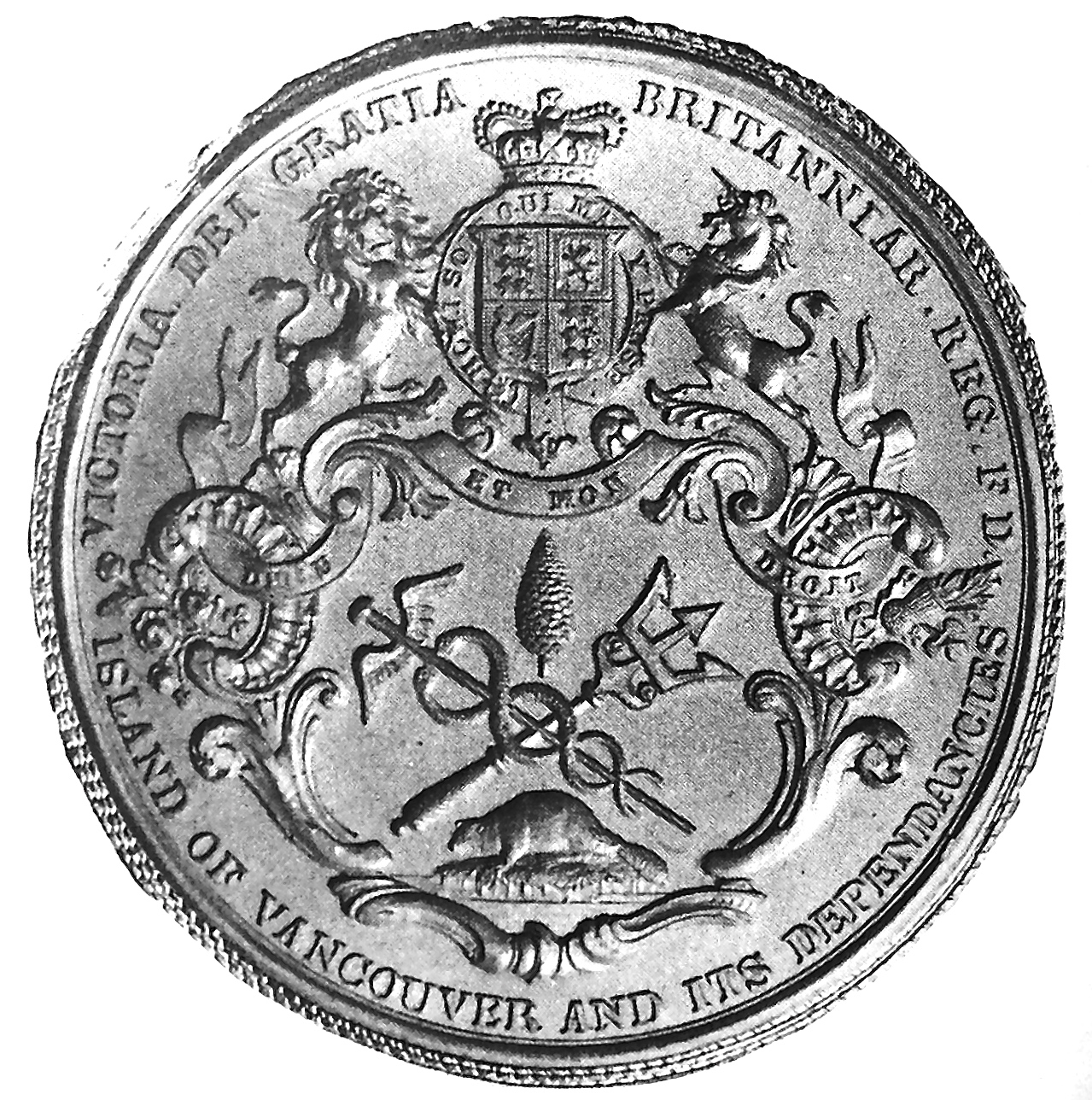
The Great Seal of the Island of Vancouver and its Dependencies was designed by Benjamin Wyon, Chief Engraver of Her Majesty's Seals, c. 1849. The symbolic badge he designed was the basis for the flag of Vancouver Island, which is still unofficially flown today.

The flag of Vancouver Island was authorized in 1865 (colonies could place their badges upon the fly of a blue ensign). This flag uses the Colonial Seal of Vancouver Island from 1849. The flag was probably never actually flown in colonial times but is used today as an unofficial representative flag.

By March 1843, James Douglas of the Hudson's Bay Company and a missionary had arrived and selected an area for settlement. Construction of the fort began in June of that year. This settlement was a fur trading post originally named Fort Albert (afterward Fort Victoria). The fort was located at the Songhees settlement of Camosack (Camosun), 200 metres (660 ft) northwest of the present-day Empress Hotel on Victoria's Inner Harbour. In 1846, the Oregon Treaty, which ended the Oregon boundary dispute, was signed by the British and the United States to settle the question of the U.S. Oregon Country borders. The Treaty made the 49th parallel latitude north the official border between the two countries. In order to ensure that Britain retained all of Vancouver Island and the southern Gulf Islands, however, it was agreed that the border would swing south around that area. In 1849, the Colony of Vancouver Island was established. The Colony was leased to the Hudson's Bay Company (HBC) for an annual fee of seven shillings; the company's responsibility in return was to increase the population by promoting colonization. The first independent settler arrived that year: Captain Walter Grant started a homestead in Sooke. Following the brief governorship of Richard Blanshard, James Douglas, Chief Factor of the Hudson's Bay post, assumed the role in 1851. The island's first legislative assembly was formed in 1856. Government buildings were built and were occupied in 1859; the replacement, today's Parliament Buildings, were opened in 1898. Fort Victoria had become an important base when prospectors, miners and merchants began arriving for the Fraser Canyon Gold Rush in 1858. The Hudson's Bay lease expired in 1859 and the island reverted to Great Britain. The burgeoning town was incorporated as Victoria in 1862. Victoria became the capital of the colony of Vancouver Island, retaining this status when the island was amalgamated with the mainland in 1866. A British naval base, including Esquimalt Royal Navy Dockyard and a naval hospital, was established at Esquimalt in 1865 and eventually taken over by the Canadian military. Today, as CFB Esquimalt, it is the home port of the Maritime Forces Pacific and parts are designated as National Historic Sites of Canada.

==== Union and Confederation ====
The economic situation of the colony declined following the Cariboo Gold Rush of 1861–1862, and pressure grew for amalgamation of the colony with the mainland colony of British Columbia (which had been established in 1858). The two colonies were merged in 1866 into the United Colonies of Vancouver Island and British Columbia by the Act for the Union of the colonies, passed by the Imperial Parliament. Arthur Kennedy was appointed governor of the united entity. (He would leave office in 1866 and later became Governor of the West African Settlements, British West Africa.) Victoria became the capital but the legislative assembly was located in New Westminster on the Lower Mainland. The capital was moved to Victoria in 1868.

==== Confederation ====
By 1867, Canada was established by the first of the British North America Acts, the Constitution Act, 1867 and the United Colonies joined Canada on 20 July 1871 through the British Columbia Terms of Union, following negotiations that secured the interests of the colonial elite in relation to a rail connection that would unite the colonies with the rest of Canada, establish Indian lands policy that would effectively perpetuate BC's pre-Confederation practices, and enshrine colonial officials' security of position. Victoria was named the capital of the province of British Columbia. Three delegates were appointed to the federal government.

== Geography ==
Topographic map of Vancouver Island

Vancouver Island is located in the southwestern corner of the province of British Columbia. It is separated from the mainland of British Columbia by Johnstone Strait and Queen Charlotte Strait on the north and northeast, and by the Strait of Georgia on the southeast, which along with the Strait of Juan de Fuca along its southwest separate it from the United States. West of the island is the open Pacific Ocean, while to its north is Queen Charlotte Sound. The Straits of Georgia and Juan de Fuca are now officially part of the Salish Sea, which also includes Puget Sound. The Vancouver Island Ranges run most of the length of the island, dividing it into a wet and rugged west coast and a drier, more rolling east coast. The highest point in these ranges and on the island is the Golden Hinde, at 2,195 m (7,201 ft). Located near the centre of Vancouver Island in 2,500 km^{2} (970 sq mi) Strathcona Provincial Park, it is part of a group of peaks that include the only glaciers on the island, the largest of which is the Comox Glacier. The west coast shoreline is rugged and in many places mountainous, characterized by its many fjords, bays, and inlets. The interior of the island has many lakes (Kennedy Lake, north of Ucluelet, is the largest) and rivers. The 49th parallel north crosses the island just north of Ladysmith on the east and Ucluelet on the west, while the 50th parallel north passes through Campbell River. Southern Vancouver Island is typically considered to refer to the area south of Courtenay, while Northern Vancouver Island, or the northern region of the island, begins in the area an hour north of Campbell River towards Sayward. Those cities and the area between Southern and Northern Vancouver Island, such as Nanaimo, Parksville, Qualicum Beach, Deep Bay, and Port Alberni, make up the Central Island region".

=== Lakes ===
- Amedroz Lake
- Angus Lake
- Arum Lake
- Beaufort Lake
- Bewlay Lake
- Brewster Lake
- Buttle Lake
- Cameron Lake
- Capes Lake
- Comox Lake
- Cowichan Lake
- Darlington Lake
- Elk Lake
- Elsie Lake
- Forbush Lake
- Globe Flower Lake
- Great Central Lake
- Hellebore Lake
- Horne Lake
- Hucuktlis Lake
- John Hart Lake
- Kennedy Lake
- Kildonan Lake
- Kim Lake
- Lake Beautiful
- Lake Helen Mackenzie
- Lizard Lake (Capital Regional District)
- Lizard Lake (Williams Creek)
- Lower Campbell Lake
- Nahmint Lake
- Nanaimo Lakes
- Nimpkish Lake
- Nitinat Lake
- Quamichan Lake
- Ralph Lake
- Sarita Lake
- Shawnigan Lake
- Somenos Lake
- Sooke Lake
- Sproat Lake
- Thetis Lake
- Upper Campbell Lake

=== Rivers ===
There are a number of rivers draining the island, some of which though short are large in volume. Among the more notable rivers are the Somass River in the Alberni Valley, the Nimpkish River in the North Island region, the Englishman River up island from Nanaimo near Parksville, and the Cowichan River whose basin forms the Cowichan Valley region in the South Island region.

=== Climate ===
Köppen climate types in Vancouver Island and the Gulf Islands

The climate of Vancouver Island is the mildest in Canada, with temperatures on the coast even in January being usually above 0 °C (32 °F). In summer, the warmest days usually have a maximum of 28–33 °C (82–91 °F). The southeastern part of the island notably has a warm summer (Csb) Mediterranean climate with numerous vineyards. The rain shadow effect of the island's mountains, as well as the mountains of Washington's Olympic Peninsula, creates wide variation in precipitation. The west coast is considerably wetter than the east coast. Average annual precipitation ranges from 6,650 millimetres (262 inches) at Hucuktlis Lake on the west coast (making it the wettest place in North America) to only 608 mm (23.9 in) at Victoria Gonzales, the driest recording station in the provincial capital of Victoria. Precipitation is heaviest in the autumn and winter. Snow is rare at low altitudes, but is common on the island's mountaintops in winter. Skiing is popular at Mount Washington in the mid-island, with an elevation of 1,588 m (5,210 ft). A notable feature of Vancouver Island is the extension of summer dryness to latitudes as high as 50 °N. Only in the extreme north of the island near Port Hardy is the rainfall of the driest summer month as much as one fifth that of the wettest months from November to March. West coasts of other continents at similar latitudes have a practically even distribution of rainfall throughout the year.

== Geology ==
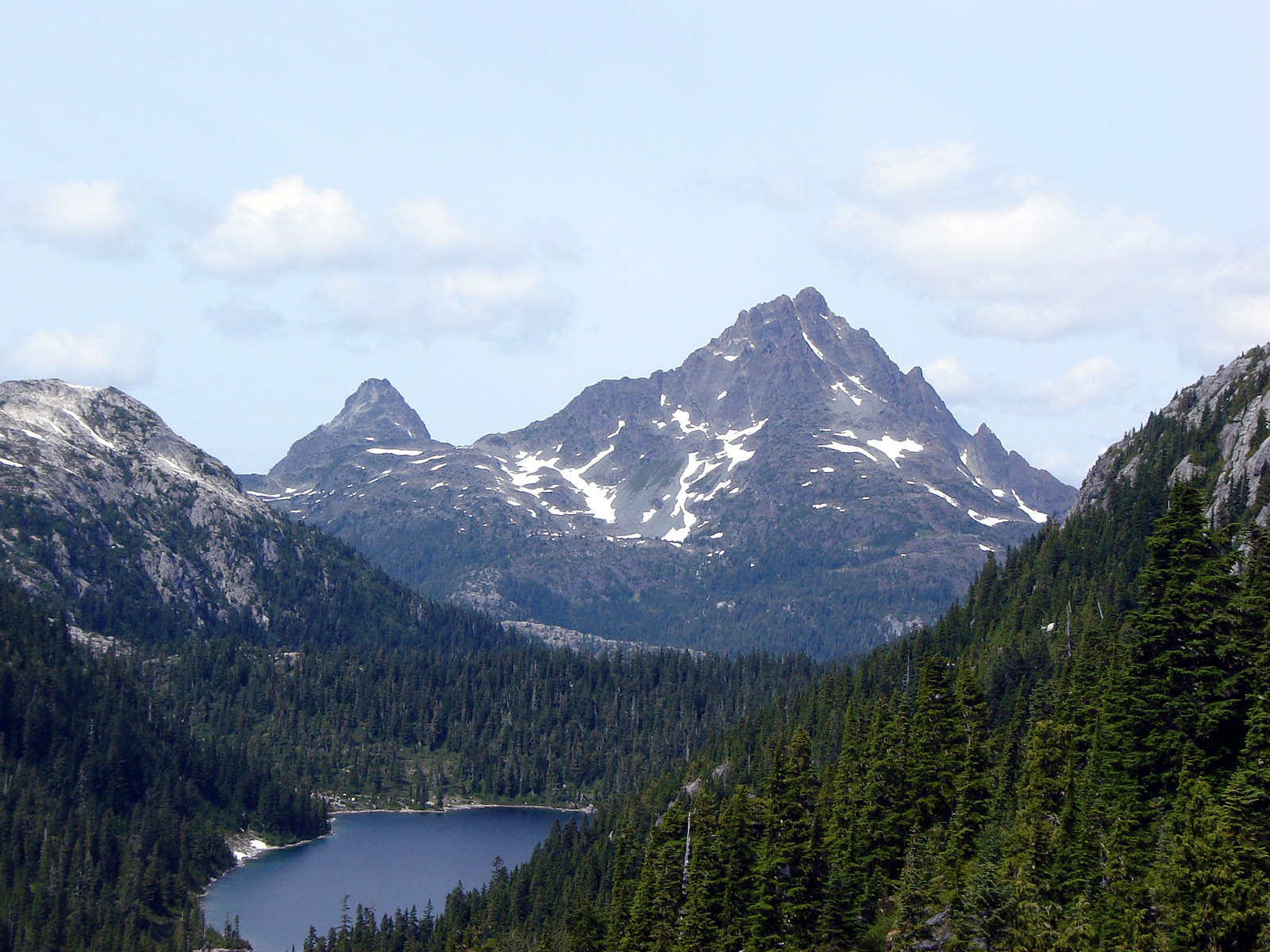
The centre of Vancouver Island contains high mountains, such as Golden Hinde.

Vancouver Island is mostly made up of volcanic and sedimentary rock which were formed offshore on the now disappeared Kula oceanic plate. Around 55 million years ago during the Paleogene Period, a microplate of the Kula Plate subducted below the North American continental margin with great strain. A volcanic arc on the surface of the Kula Plate was thus accreted and fused onto the western edge of North America. These terranes were subjected to extreme warping from continued subduction of the Kula plate, leading to the formation of the distorted Insular Mountains. Much of the central mountainous region around Strathcona Park is part of the Karmutsen Formation, which is a sequence of tholeiitic pillow basalts and breccias. Since Vancouver Island has become an accretionary wedge on the North American continent, the Kula Plate has fully subducted beneath it and the remnants of the Farallon Plate, the Juan de Fuca Plate, are now subducting below the island. This process has led to Vancouver Island being one of the most seismically active regions in Canada. The Cascadia subduction zone off the coast of the island forms a section of the Ring of Fire. The area has been known to host megathrust earthquakes in the past, the last being the Cascadia earthquake of 1700. The Forbidden Plateau, in the east of the Vancouver Island Ranges, was the epicentre of the 1946 Vancouver Island earthquake that registered 7.3 on the moment magnitude scale, the strongest ever recorded on land in Canada. Vancouver Island was the location of the observation of the episodic tremor and slip (ETS) seismic phenomenon.

== Ecology ==
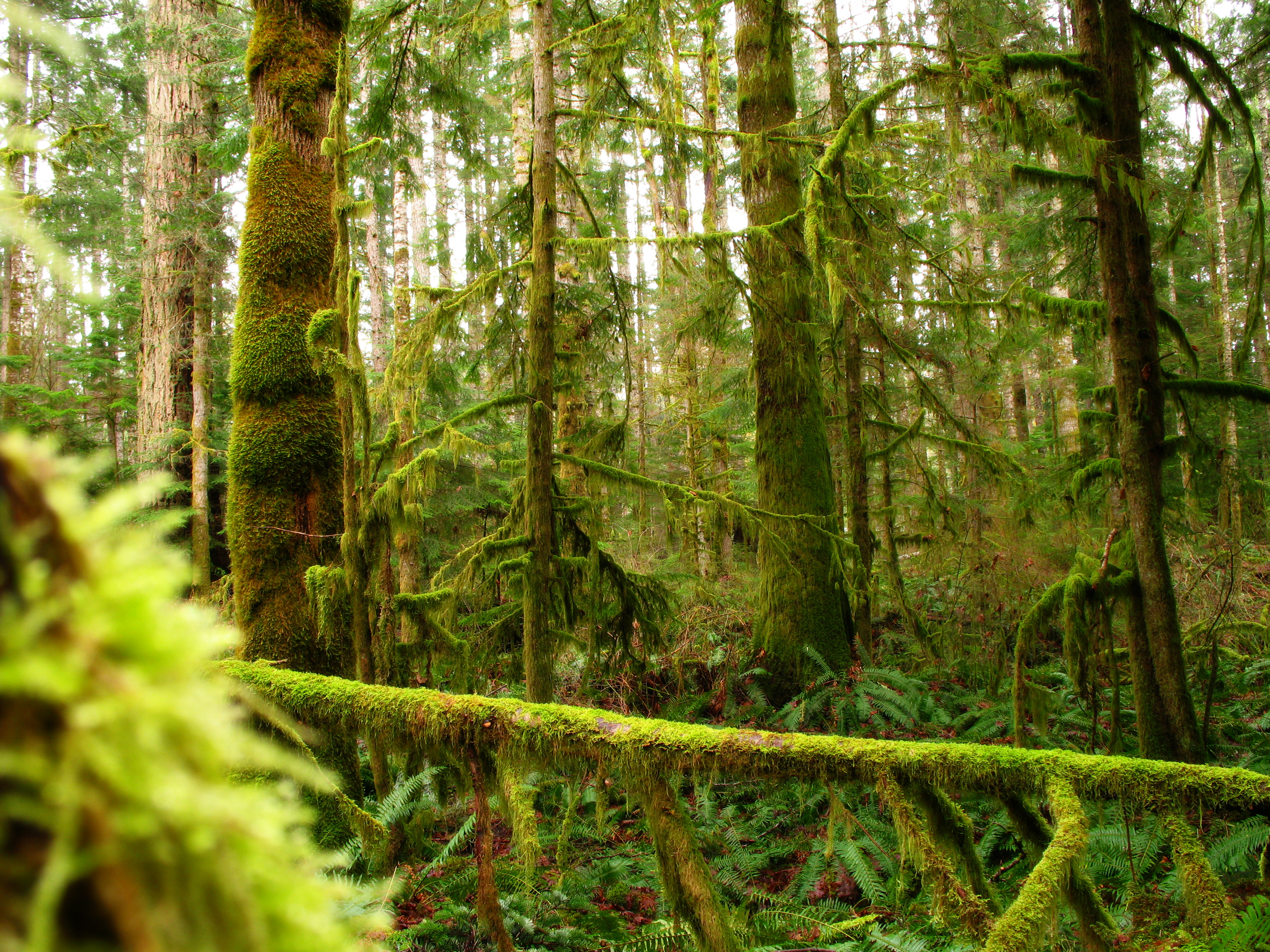
The western side of Vancouver Island hosts a rainforest.

Vancouver Island lies in the temperate rainforest biome. On the southern and eastern portions of the island, this is characterized by Douglas fir, western red cedar, arbutus (or madrone), Garry oak, salal, Oregon grape, and manzanita; moreover, Vancouver Island is the location where the Douglas fir was first recorded by Archibald Menzies. Vancouver Island is also the location where some of the tallest Douglas fir were recorded. This southeastern portion of the island is the most heavily populated region of Vancouver Island and a major area for recreation. The northern, western, and most of the central portions of the island are home to the coniferous "big trees" associated with British Columbia's coast – western hemlock, western red cedar, Pacific silver fir, yellow cedar, Douglas fir, grand fir, Sitka spruce, and western white pine. It is also characterised by bigleaf maple, red alder, sword fern, and red huckleberry.

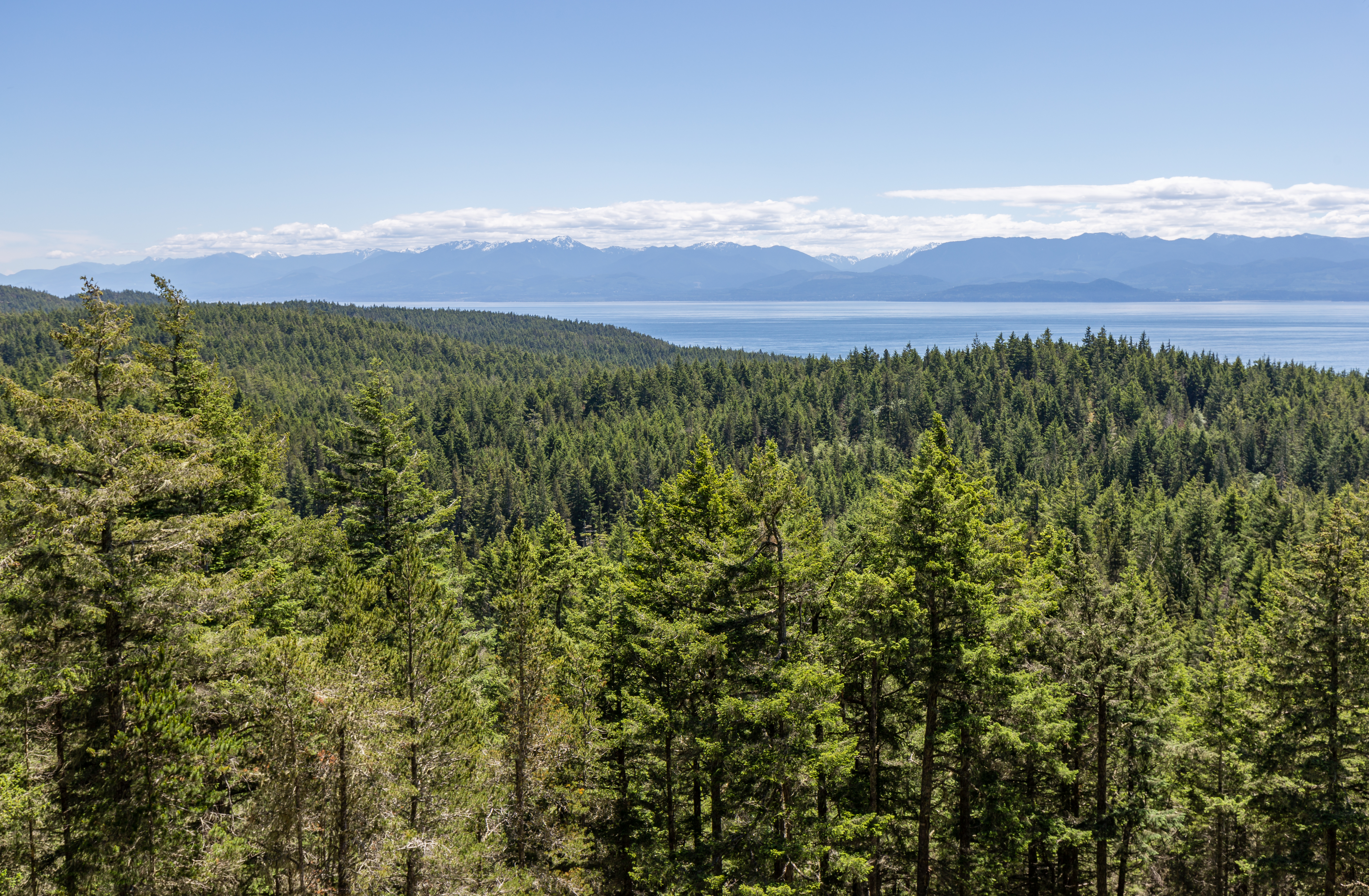
View from Mount Maguire in East Sooke Regional Park towards Washington

The fauna of Vancouver Island is similar to that found on the mainland coast, with some notable exceptions and additions. For example, mountain goats, moose, coyotes, porcupines, skunks, chipmunks, and numerous species of small mammals, while plentiful on the mainland, are absent from Vancouver Island. Grizzly bears are absent from the island, where black bears are prevalent, but in 2016, a pair of grizzlies were sighted swimming between smaller islands off the coast near Port McNeill. Vancouver Island does support most of Canada's Roosevelt elk, however, and several mammal species and subspecies, such as the Vancouver Island marmot are unique to the island. Columbian black-tailed deer are plentiful, even in suburban areas such as in Greater Victoria, as well as the native American red squirrels. The Eastern grey squirrel is found in the south and is considered invasive for its voracious appetite and scaring away of the Douglas squirrels. The island has the most concentrated population of cougars in North America. The Vancouver Island wolf, a subspecies of grey wolf, is found only on the north part of the island. Harbour seals and river otters are common.

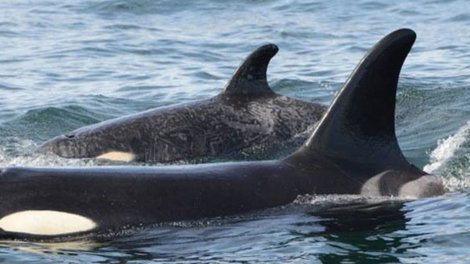
Northern resident orca Springer with her first calf in 2013.

Resident orcas live in two major groups, one in the waters of the south island and one in the north, while a third group of transient orcas roam much farther and avoid the resident orcas. Residents are watched from a distance and are numbered, with many being named as well. Humpback whales and grey whales are often seen on their migration between Alaskan waters where they feed in the summer and southern waters such as around California and Mexico where they give birth in the winter. The island's rivers, lakes, and coastal regions are renowned for their fisheries of trout, salmon, and steelhead.

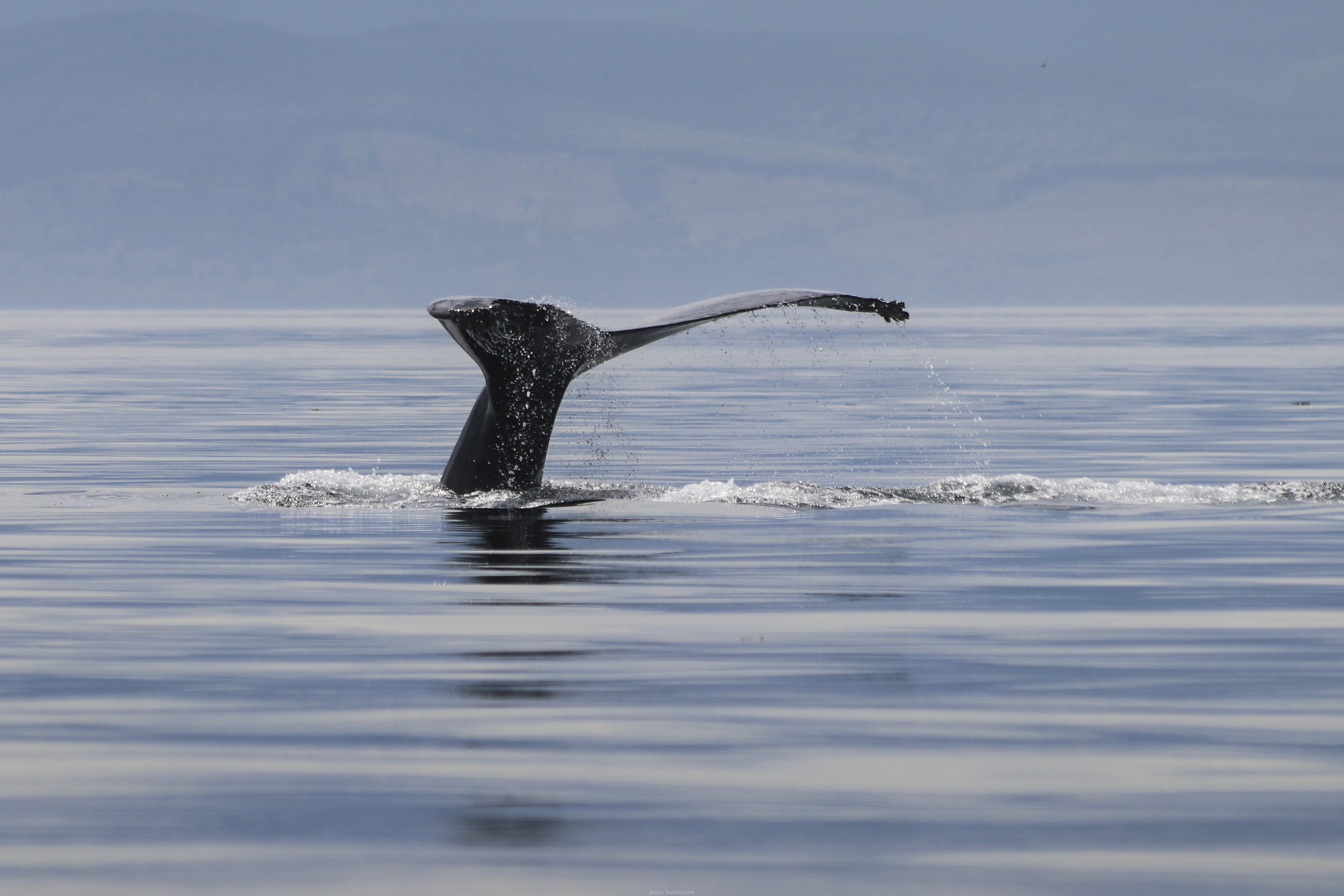
Humpback whale off the coast of Sooke

After near-total extirpation by fur traders in the 18th and 19th centuries, sea otters (Enhydra lutris) were protected by an international treaty in 1911. Despite protection, the remnant population off Vancouver Island died out with the last sea otter taken near Kyuquot in 1929. From 1969 to 1972, 89 sea otters were flown or shipped from Alaska to the west coast of Vancouver Island. This population expanded to over 3,000 as of 2005, and their range on the island's west coast expanded from Cape Scott in the north to Barkley Sound to the south.

== Demographics ==
The majority of Vancouver Island's population lives in the Capital Regional District, more specifically in the primate city and the provincial capital of Victoria. With a population of 397,237 (2021), Greater Victoria is the island's largest population centre and one of its two census metropolitan areas. The island's other metropolitan area is Nanaimo, which has a population of 115,459 as of 2021. There are also five census agglomeration areas (Alberni Valley, Campbell River, Comox Valley, Cowichan Valley, and Oceanside) as defined by Statistics Canada.

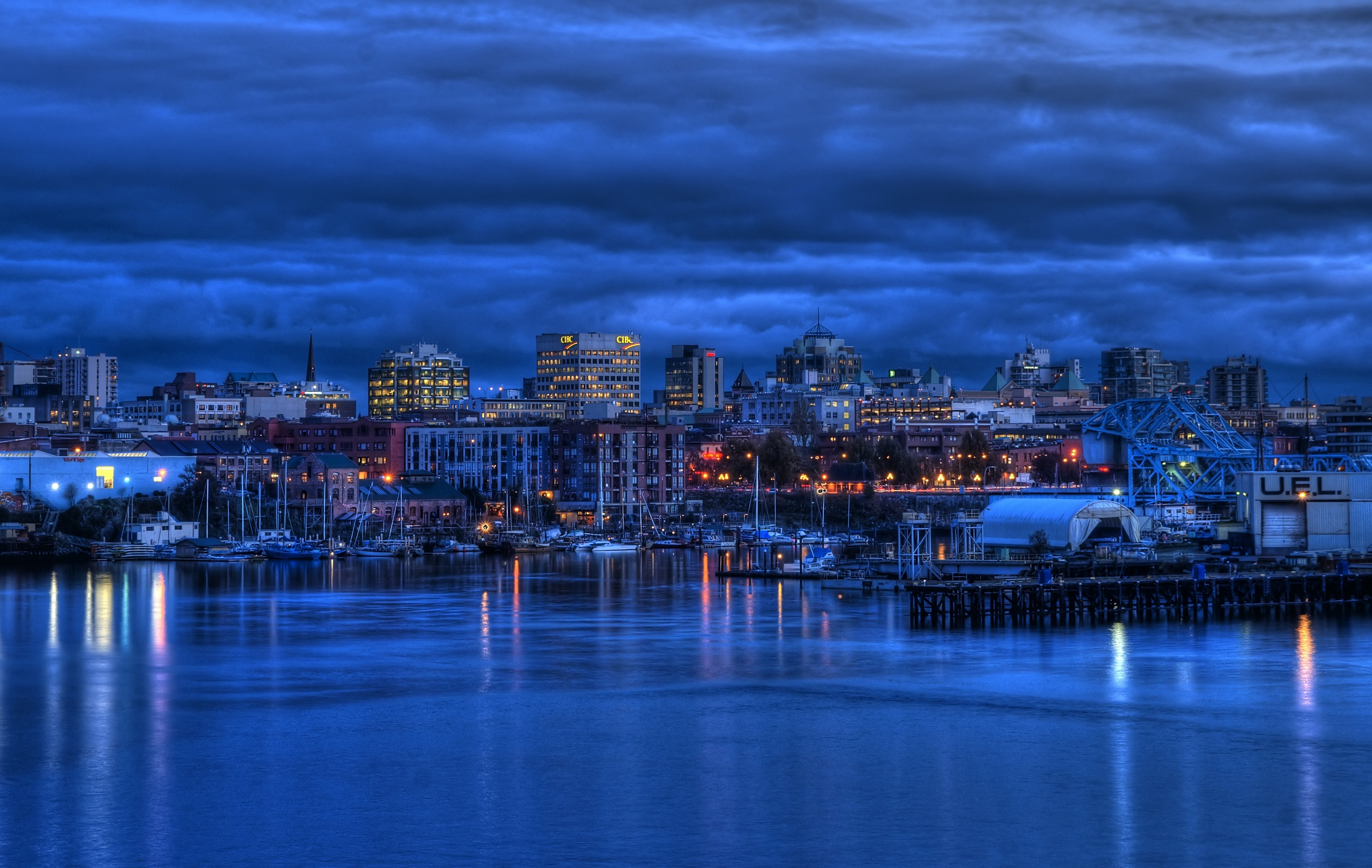
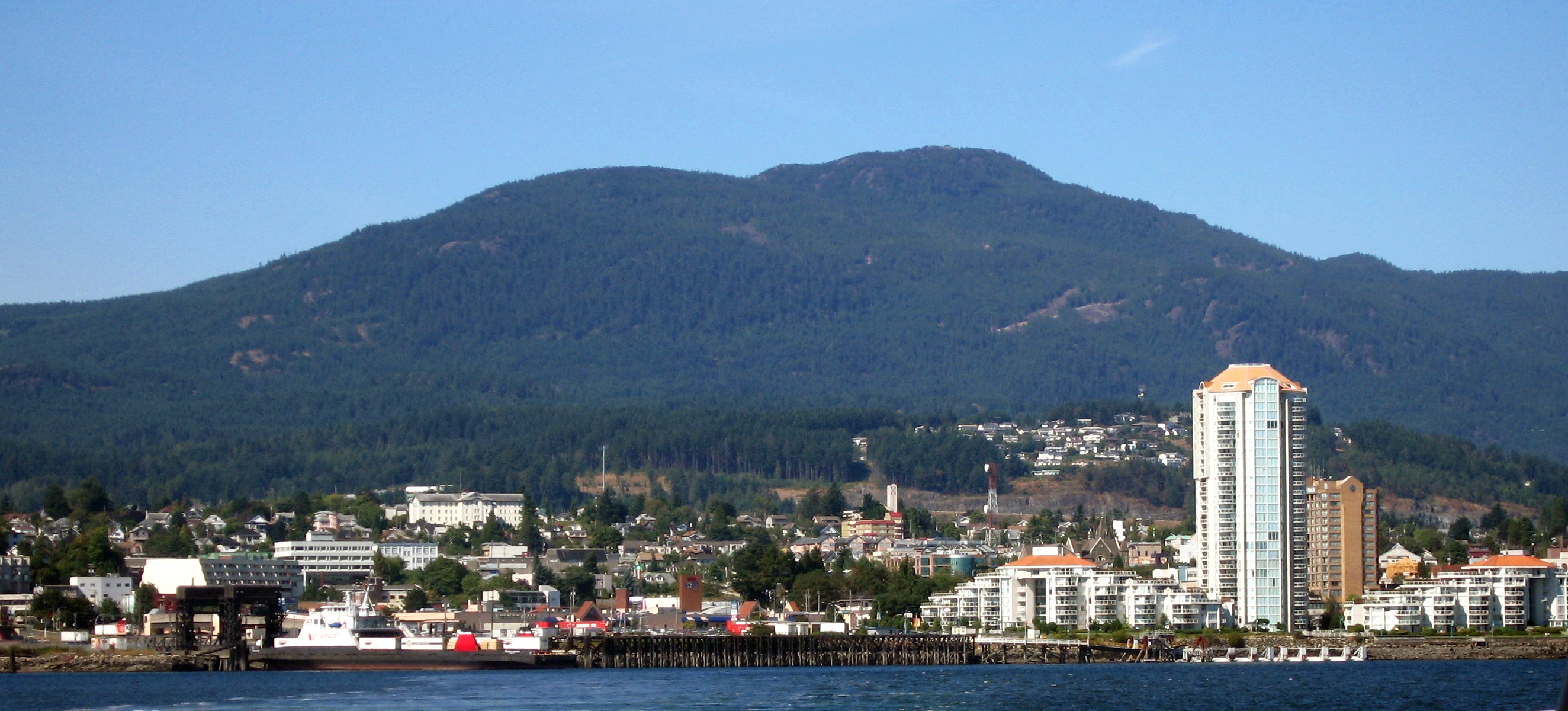
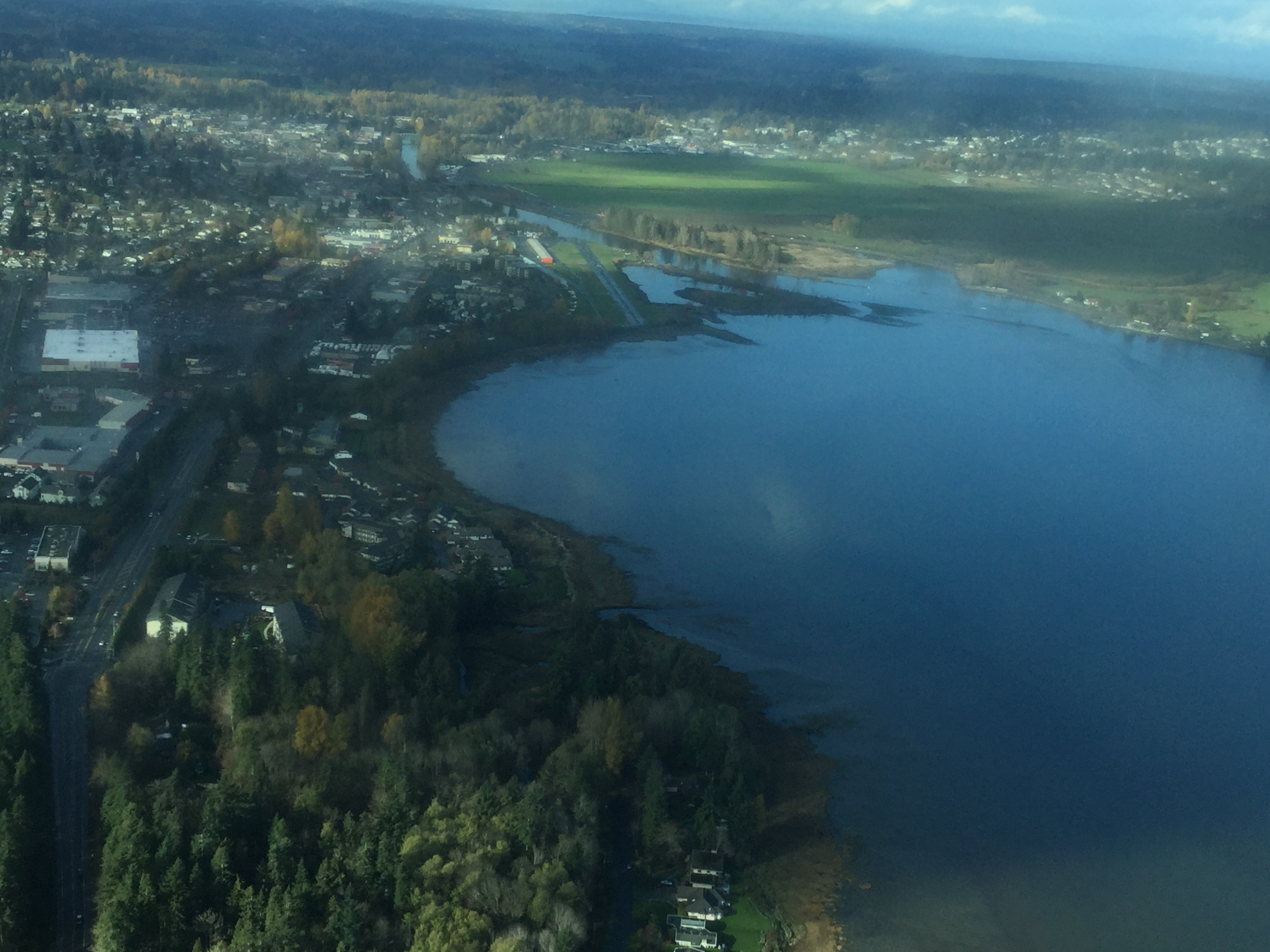
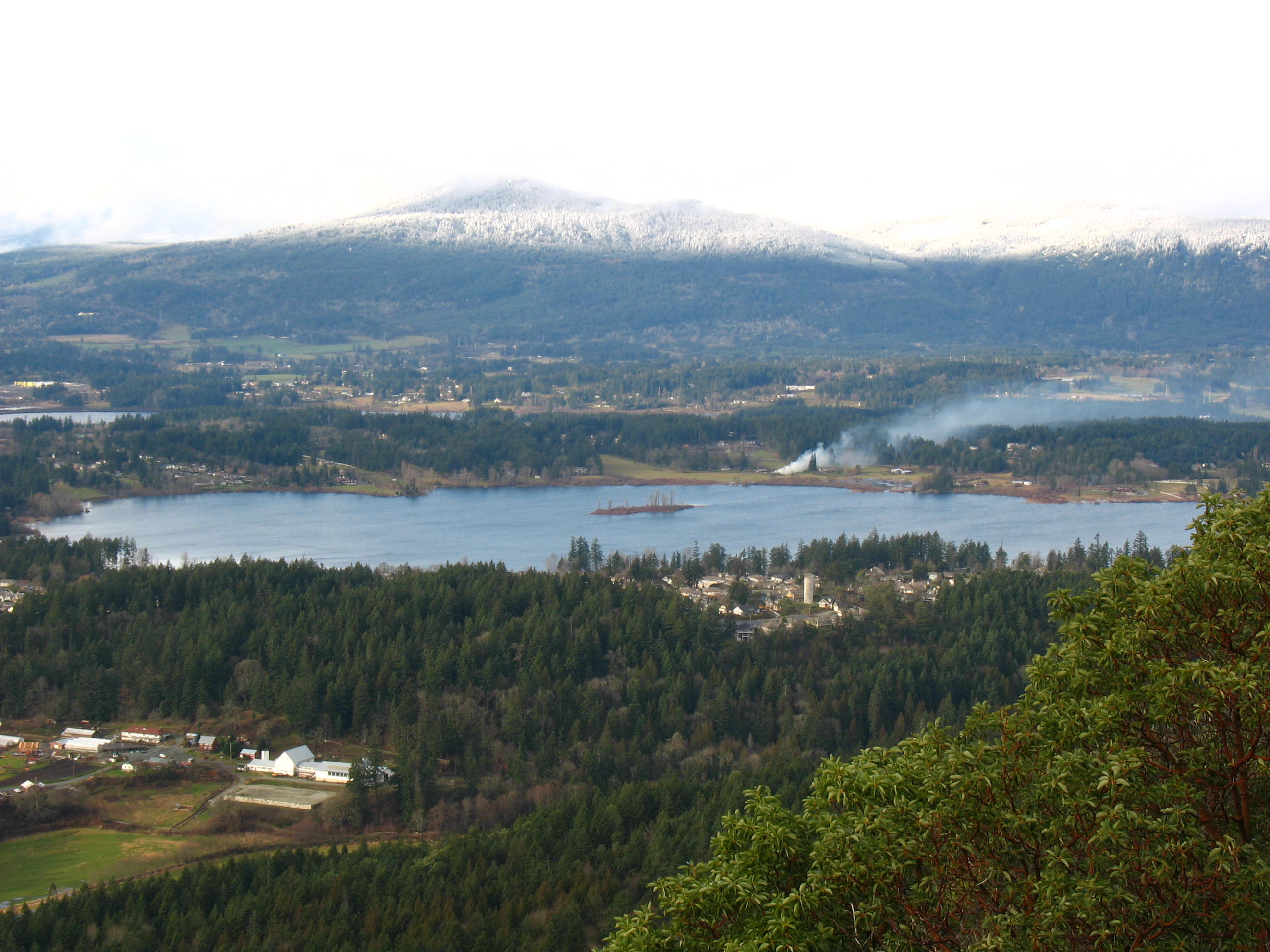
Largest population centres of Vancouver Island According to the 2021 Census
	Rank	City name	Regional district	Pop.
Victoria Nanaimo	1	Victoria	Capital	397,237	Courtenay Duncan
Victoria Nanaimo	2	Nanaimo	Nanaimo	115,459	Courtenay Duncan
Victoria Nanaimo	3	Courtenay	Comox Valley	63,282	Courtenay Duncan
Victoria Nanaimo	4	Duncan	Cowichan Valley	47,582	Courtenay Duncan
Victoria Nanaimo	5	Campbell River	Strathcona	40,704	Courtenay Duncan
Victoria Nanaimo	6	Parksville	Nanaimo	31,054	Courtenay Duncan
Victoria Nanaimo	7	Port Alberni	Alberni-Clayoquot	25,786	Courtenay Duncan
Victoria Nanaimo	8	Ladysmith	Cowichan Valley	15,501	Courtenay Duncan

== Economy ==
=== Technology ===
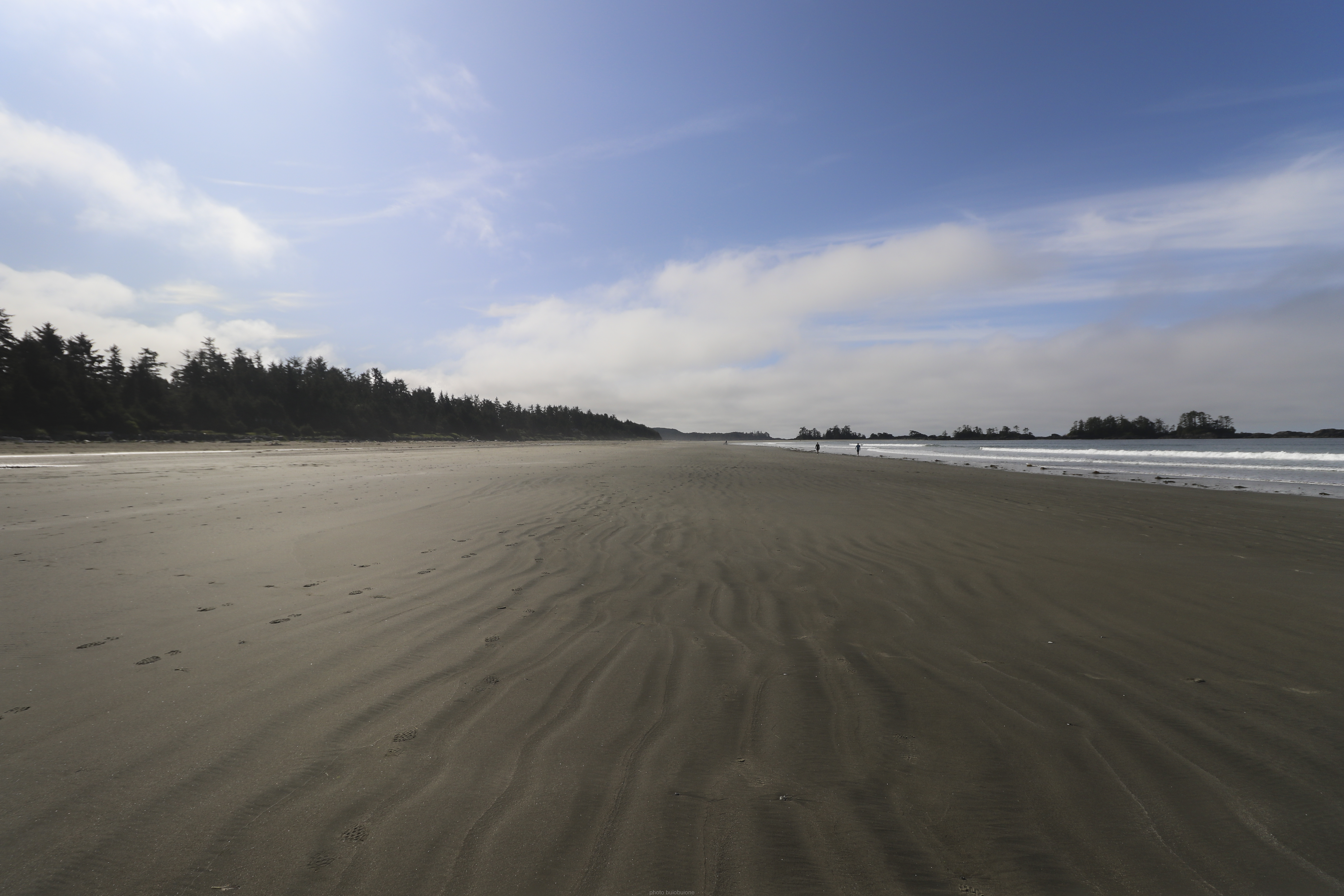
Long Beach, Tofino

Within the island's largest city, Victoria, there is a significant IT and technology industry. According to the Victoria Advanced Technology Council website, over 800 technology companies operate in the Victoria area, with combined annual revenues of $1.95 billion. High-speed internet is delivered to the island by Shaw Communications, Telus, and various local providers with their own networks. Wireless Internet connections can be found all over the island, many free for public use. The island generates much of its own power at several hydroelectric stations, but increased demand has required the construction of several high-voltage power cables, both HVDC and AC, connecting to the Canadian Mainland since 1968.

=== Logging ===
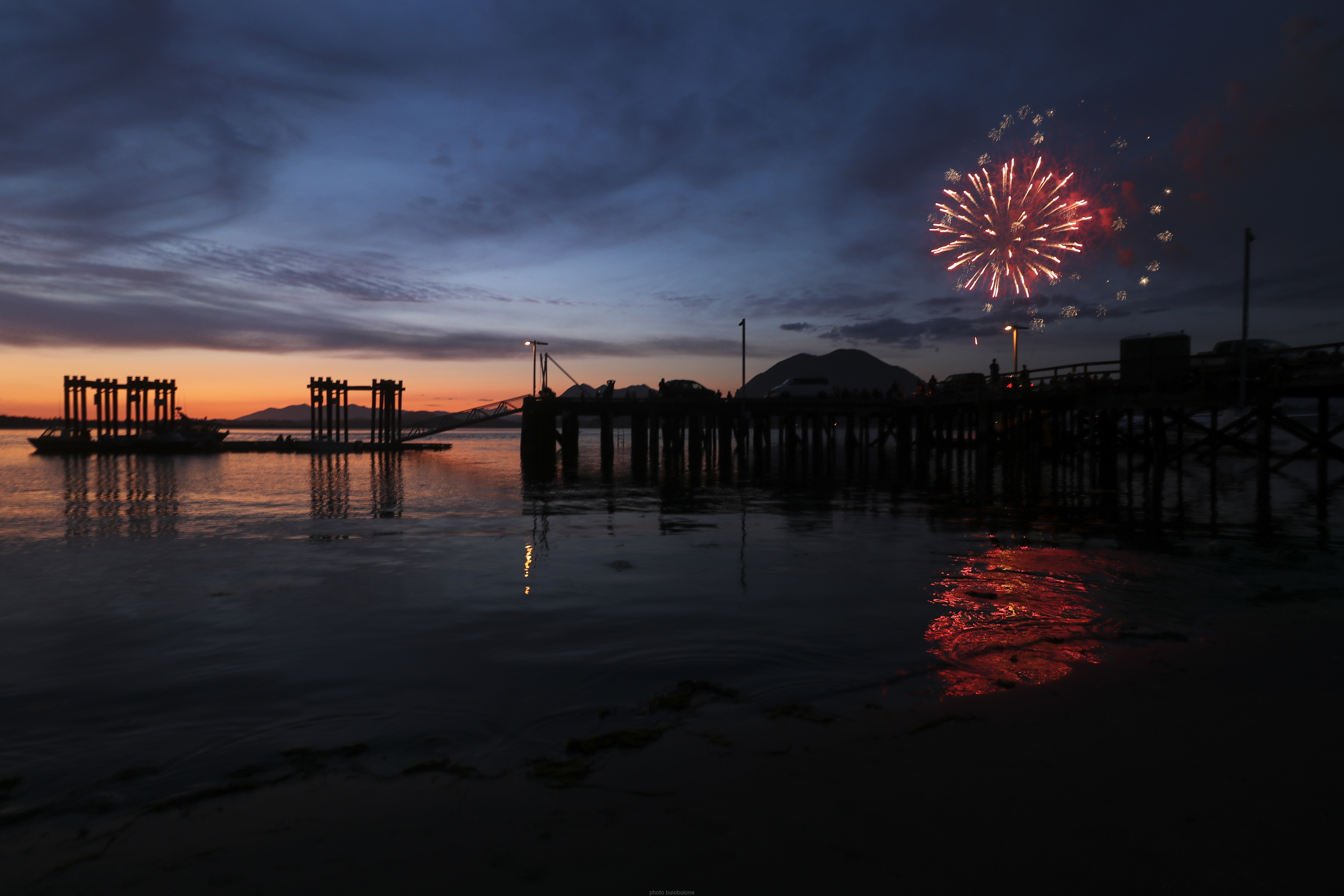
Fireworks on 15 August at the Tofino pier

Outside of Victoria, Vancouver Island's economy is largely dominated by the forestry industry. Many of the logging operations are for export, although, historically, were for sawn lumber and pulp and paper operations. Recently, rotations are much shorter than the historical 80 years. Logging operations involving old-growth forests such as those found in Clayoquot Sound are controversial and, due to the Clayoquot protests, gained international attention through the efforts of activists and environmental organizations. Another source of controversy all over the island are logging operations occurring in community watersheds.

=== Fishing ===
Fishing plays a large role in the lives of many islanders. Commercial fishing vessels operate out of the island's ports and harbours, and coastal fish farms produce many tons of Atlantic salmon yearly.

=== Tourism ===
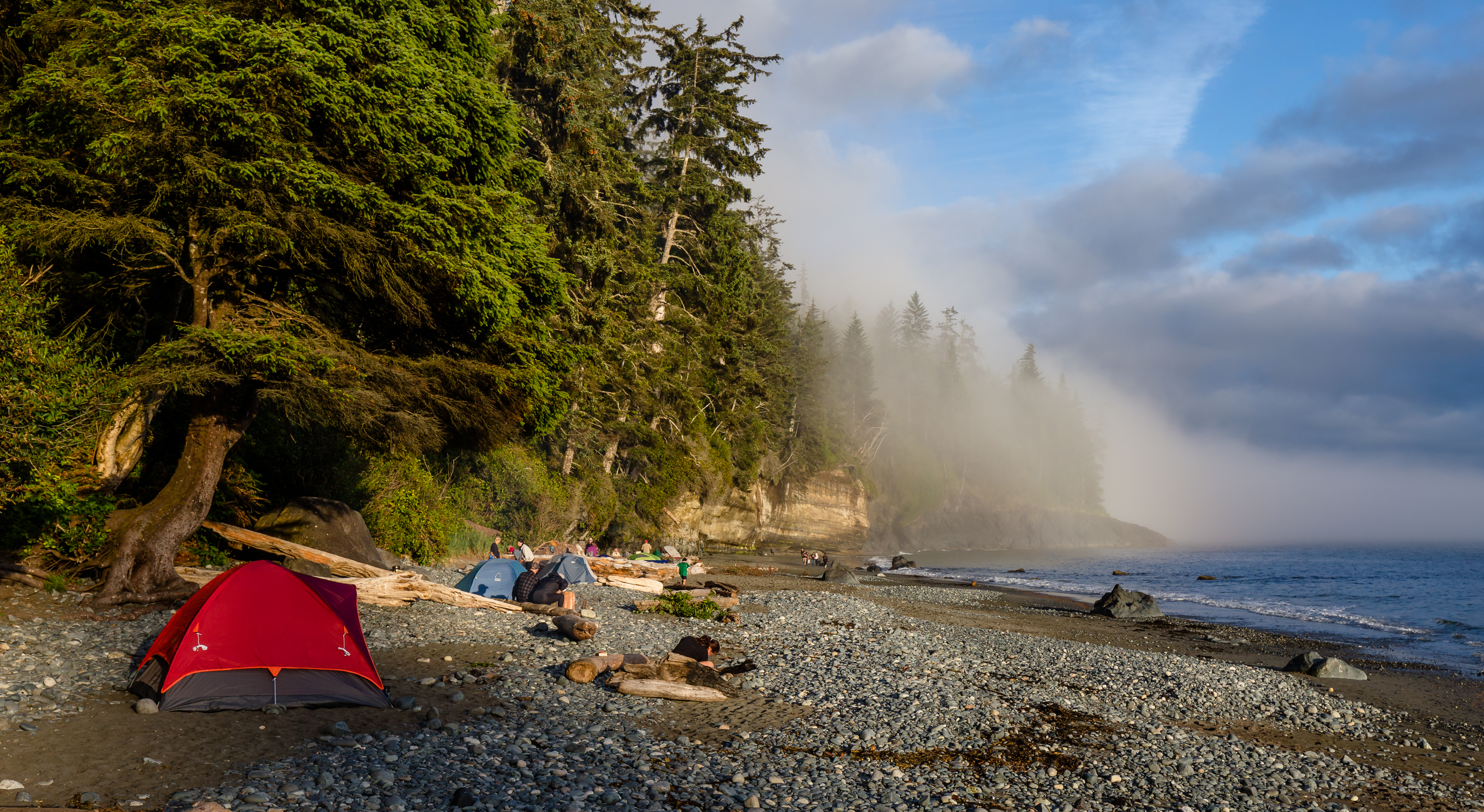
Campsite at Mystic Beach

In recent years the government of British Columbia has engaged in an advertising program to draw more tourists to beach resorts in places such as Tofino and Ucluelet. Sport fishing, whale watching, hiking, scuba diving, surfing, and skiing are just a few things for which tourists visit Vancouver Island. Visitors also come to see Victoria's 19th-century architecture, and the many villages which line the coast such as Cowichan Bay, Chemainus, and Qualicum Beach. The cities of Victoria and Nanaimo also draw large numbers of visitors, and in 2022 the Vancouver Island tourism region generated $3.2 billion of gross spending in the region, accounting for approximately 18% of BC's total overnight spending.

=== Food products ===
Consumer food products companies also exist in the various cities and towns on Vancouver Island. Bakeries, dairies, food processing plants, breweries, wineries, of varying size and scope, are found all along the island. Some of these organizations have international customer reach. Agriculture is confined primarily to the fertile soils found in low-lying areas on the southern and eastern portions of the island. Those areas have the best climate for agricultural production. The total amount of farmland area on Vancouver Island in 2021 was over 41,000 hectares (100,000 acres).

=== Mining ===
Mining, particularly for copper and coal, played a significant historical role in the economic development and settlement of Vancouver Island, from the mid-19th to the mid-20th century. Although there remains some activity and promise of further development in the sector, it is not economically significant at present.

== Education ==
Vancouver Island is home to a handful of universities, several colleges and trade-schools, hundreds of public schools, and a few dozen private schools (including Montessori and Waldorf schools).

=== Universities ===
- University of Victoria
- Vancouver Island University (formerly Malaspina University-College)
- Royal Roads University

=== Colleges ===
- Camosun College
- North Island College
- Pacific Horticulture College

=== Public school districts ===
There are 12 school districts on Vancouver Island with several elementary, junior high, and high schools in each. Three school districts are in the Greater Victoria area and the other eight cover the rest of the island to the north. All public schooling falls under the jurisdiction of the British Columbia Ministry of Education.

- Greater Victoria
- Nanaimo-Ladysmith
- Sooke
- Qualicum
- Saanich
- Alberni
- Gulf Islands
- Comox Valley
- Campbell River
- Vancouver Island West
- Cowichan Valley
- Vancouver Island North

== Transport ==
=== Sea ===
Marine transport is very important to Vancouver Island for access to the mainland of British Columbia and Washington. There are no bridges or tunnels connecting the island to the mainland, although the idea of building one has been proposed many times. Major technical challenges and cost are the largest barriers to a fixed link currently, though exact public support for the idea is not currently known. Vancouver Island relies on ferry services for passenger, vehicle, and freight transportation. BC Ferries, Washington State Ferries, and Black Ball Transport operate the primary vehicle ferry routes serving the island. Marine transport also plays an important role in moving commercial freight between Vancouver Island and the mainland. In the 1860s a plan was proposed to link Vancouver Island to the mainland at Bute Inlet, by a bridge, using Ripple Rock as a mid-support for the bridge. The proposal persisted for many years, and caused political opposition to destroying Ripple Rock until it was decided to destroy the rock to improve safety for mariners.

==== BC Ferries ====
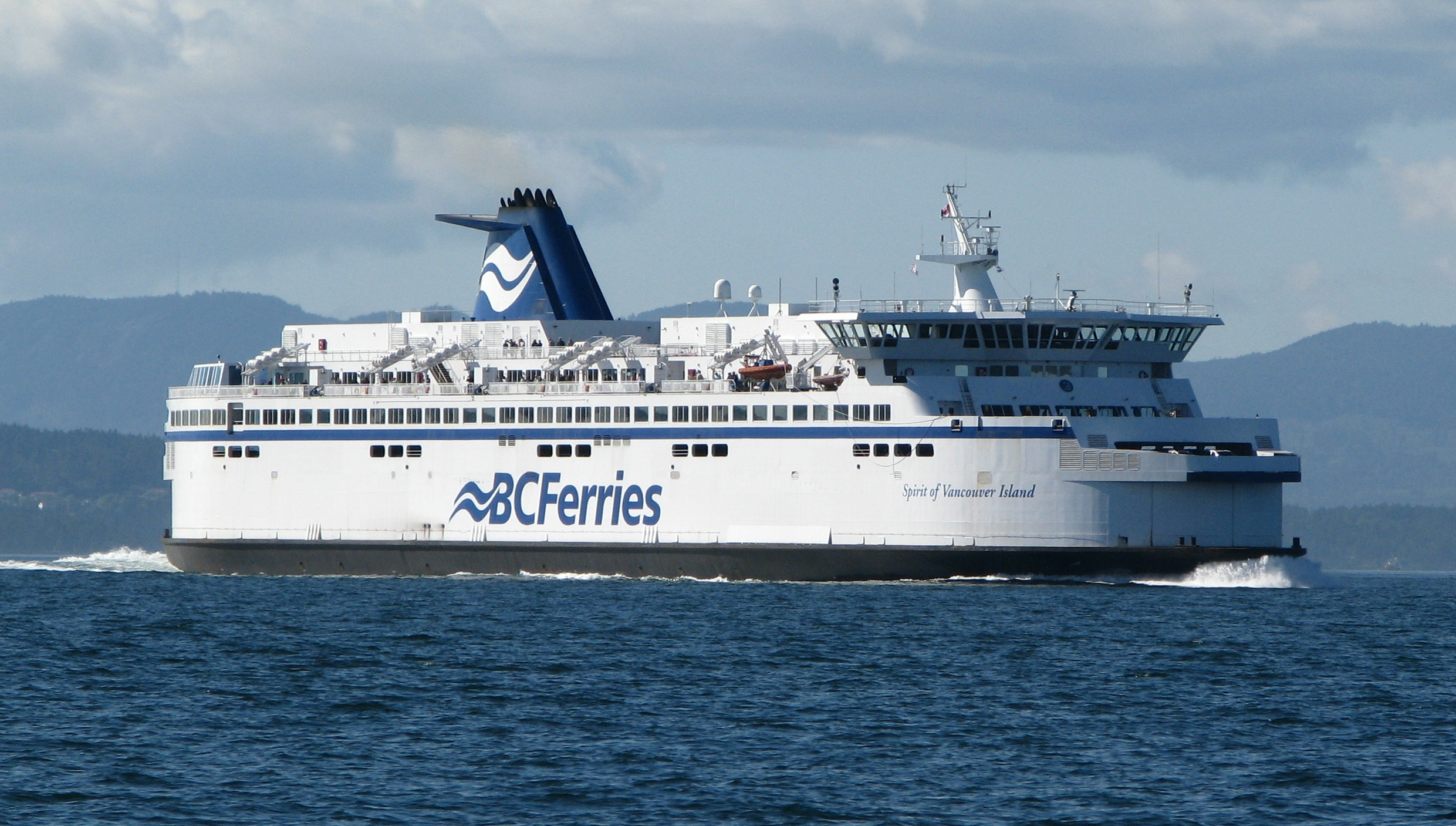
BC Ferries Spirit of Vancouver Island, en route from Swartz Bay to Tsawwassen

- Tsawwassen (38 km (24 mi) south of Vancouver) – Swartz Bay (32 km (20 mi) north of Victoria)

Crossing time: 1 hour 35 minutes; 8 sailings per day year-round with added sailings depending on day and season)

- Tsawwassen – Duke Point (13 km (8.1 mi) south of Nanaimo)

Crossing time: 2 hours; 8 round trips daily – varies in winter.

- Horseshoe Bay (19 km (12 mi) northwest of Vancouver) – Departure Bay (3 km (1.9 mi) north of downtown Nanaimo)

Crossing time: 1 hour 35 minutes; Sailings every 2 hours with extra sailings during the summer and holidays.

- Gulf Islands – Swartz Bay

Crossing time: 35 minutes- 3 hours depending on island of departure; 4 or more trips daily.

- Powell River – Comox

Crossing time: 1 hour 20 minutes; 4 round trips daily.

- Port Hardy – Prince Rupert

Service daily or on alternate days; changes seasonally.

==== Washington State Ferries ====
- Anacortes, Washington – Sidney

Crossing time: 2 hours (not counting stops in the San Juan Islands)
Note that this ferry service is inactive.
According to the Washington State Department of Transport: International service to and from Sidney, B.C. remains suspended until further notice due to continued significant crewing and vessel availability challenges. There will be no service to and from Sidney through at least Spring of 2030.

==== Black Ball Transport ====
- Port Angeles, Washington – Victoria

Crossing time: 1 hour 30 minutes; 1 to 4 round trips daily; changes seasonally.

==== Passenger-only service ====
- Hullo Ferries (Vancouver – Nanaimo)

Crossing time: 1 hour 15 minutes; 3 to 6 round trips daily

- Victoria Clipper (Seattle, Washington – Victoria)

Crossing time: 2 hour 45 minutes; 1 to 3 round trips daily

=== Rail ===
Island Corridor Foundation (ICF) was established in 2006 for the purpose of owning and managing the former Esquimalt and Nanaimo (E&N) Rail Corridor on Vancouver Island now known as the Island Rail Corridor. The ICF established a contract with Southern Railway of British Columbia (SRY) to move all rail freight on the Island to and from the Lower Mainland. SRY assumed operational control from RailAmerica in July 2006 and currently only offers local freight service on the Nanaimo segment of the Victoria–Courtenay mainline (called the Victoria Subdivision by the railroad). The Port Alberni branch line (called the Port Alberni Subdivision by the railroad) has been out of service since 2002. Passenger service, which had been operated by VIA Rail under contract, was halted in 2011 after it was identified that a portion of the line failed to meet operating requirements for passenger service. Since then, there have been ongoing efforts to secure funding from various levels of government to complete the necessary repairs, but the issue remains fluid. Western Forest Products operated the Englewood Railway which was Canada's last logging railway, running from Woss to Beaver Cove on the northern end of the island. The former Canadian National Railway line running from Victoria to the Cowichan Valley was abandoned in the late 1980s/early 1990s, and the former grade between Victoria and Sooke is now the multi-use Galloping Goose Regional Trail. The BC Forest Discovery Centre has a narrow-gauge railway winding around the park, and the Alberni Pacific Railway operates a tour train during the summer from the restored E&N Railway station in Port Alberni to the McLean's Mill on former E&N Railway trackage that is now owned by the ICF.

=== Road ===
There is one major north–south highway system on the island, which runs along the eastern side. It begins in Victoria as Highway 1 which is part of the Trans-Canada Highway system as far as Nanaimo. There, Highway 19 takes over and continues to Port Hardy. The route is a patchwork of two-, four-, and six-lane roadways between Victoria and Port Hardy. The engineering characteristics and traffic control systems of the roadway vary widely from one city or district to the next and include the following variations: Trans-Canada Highway:

1. Congested, heavily signalized four-lane urban core streets with heavy pedestrian activity in Victoria and Duncan.
2. Short four- to six-lane freeways with interchanges just west of Victoria and just south of Nanaimo.
3. A mix of two-lane to four-lane winding mountain arterial highway over the Malahat pass.
4. A moderate to heavily signalized four-lane divided arterial highway from Mill Bay to Nanaimo (interrupted by the Duncan urban core).

Highway 19:

1. A moderately signalized expressway called the Nanaimo Parkway bypassing Nanaimo.
2. A lightly signalized four-lane divided arterial highway from Nanaimo to Parksville.
3. A stretch of four-lane high-speed freeway/expressway from Parksville to Campbell River.
4. A moderate-speed two-lane arterial highway north from Campbell River to Port Hardy.

Proposals have been made for a mainland-to-island fixed link for over a century. Because of the extreme depth and soft seabed of the Georgia Strait, and the potential for seismic activity, a bridge or tunnel would face monumental engineering, safety, and environmental challenges at a prohibitive cost. Another north–south route is Highway 17 a four-lane divided highway that has a mix of interchanges and traffic lights. It connects Victoria with the Saanich Peninsula, terminating the Vancouver Island portion of its route at the Swartz Bay ferry terminal. The main east–west routes are mostly two-lane but are generally free of the congestion seen on some of the four-lane highways. They comprise the following:

- Highway 4 between Qualicum Beach and Tofino;
- Highway 14 between Greater Victoria and Port Renfrew;
- Highway 18 between Duncan and Lake Cowichan;
- Highway 28 between Campbell River and Gold River; and
- Highway 30 between Port McNeill and Port Alice.

Vancouver Island is also well served by secondary routes, a growing number of which have efficient roundabouts in place of the traffic lights that can back up traffic on the main highway routes. Numerous active and decommissioned logging and forest service roads provide access to the backcountry. Many communities are served by public and private transit. Greater Victoria is one of the few places in North America where double-decker buses are used in the regular public transit system. Tofino Bus All Island Express serves all major cities on Vancouver Island.

=== Air ===
There are 52 certified airports, registered aerodromes and heliports on Vancouver Island. This number includes seven aerodromes and airports in Greater Victoria. Victoria International Airport, (IATA: YYJ, ICAO: CYYJ), is the major airport on Vancouver Island. In 2018, it was the 11th busiest airport in Canada in terms of passenger movements (1,924,385). As of 2020, carriers include Air Canada Express, Air Canada Rouge, Air North, Alaska Airlines, Pacific Coastal Airlines, WestJet and WestJet Encore. They offer a variety of direct flights of short and medium distances including to and from Seattle, Calgary, Edmonton, Vancouver, Whitehorse and Toronto. Air Canada Rouge, Pacific Coastal Airlines, Sunwing Airlines, Swoop and WestJet offer seasonal services to several destinations including Mexico. Other land-based airports with scheduled services are Campbell River, CFB Comox, (Comox Valley Airport), Nanaimo, Port Hardy, Qualicum Beach and Tofino/Long Beach. In addition, there are seven water airports with scheduled services, Campbell River, Comox, Nanaimo Harbour, Port Alberni, Tofino Harbour, Victoria and Victoria Inner Harbour. Much of the floatplane traffic is downtown-to-downtown service between Victoria Inner Harbour, Nanaimo Harbour and Vancouver Harbour, the primary carriers being Harbour Air Seaplanes, Seair Seaplanes and Corilair. Harbour Air also flies to other areas around Vancouver, service to Kenmore Air Harbor Seaplane Base on Seattle's Lake Union is provided by Kenmore Air. Smaller airlines include Tofino Air, Pacific Seaplanes and Sunshine Coast Air. These carriers make several daily scheduled flights, weather permitting. Helicopter service is provided by Helijet in Victoria and various private operators elsewhere.

== See also ==
- Cascadia subduction zone
- Island Health
- List of provincial parks of Vancouver Island
- West Coast of Vancouver Island Aquatic Management Board
