= Deep Bay, British Columbia =

Deep Bay
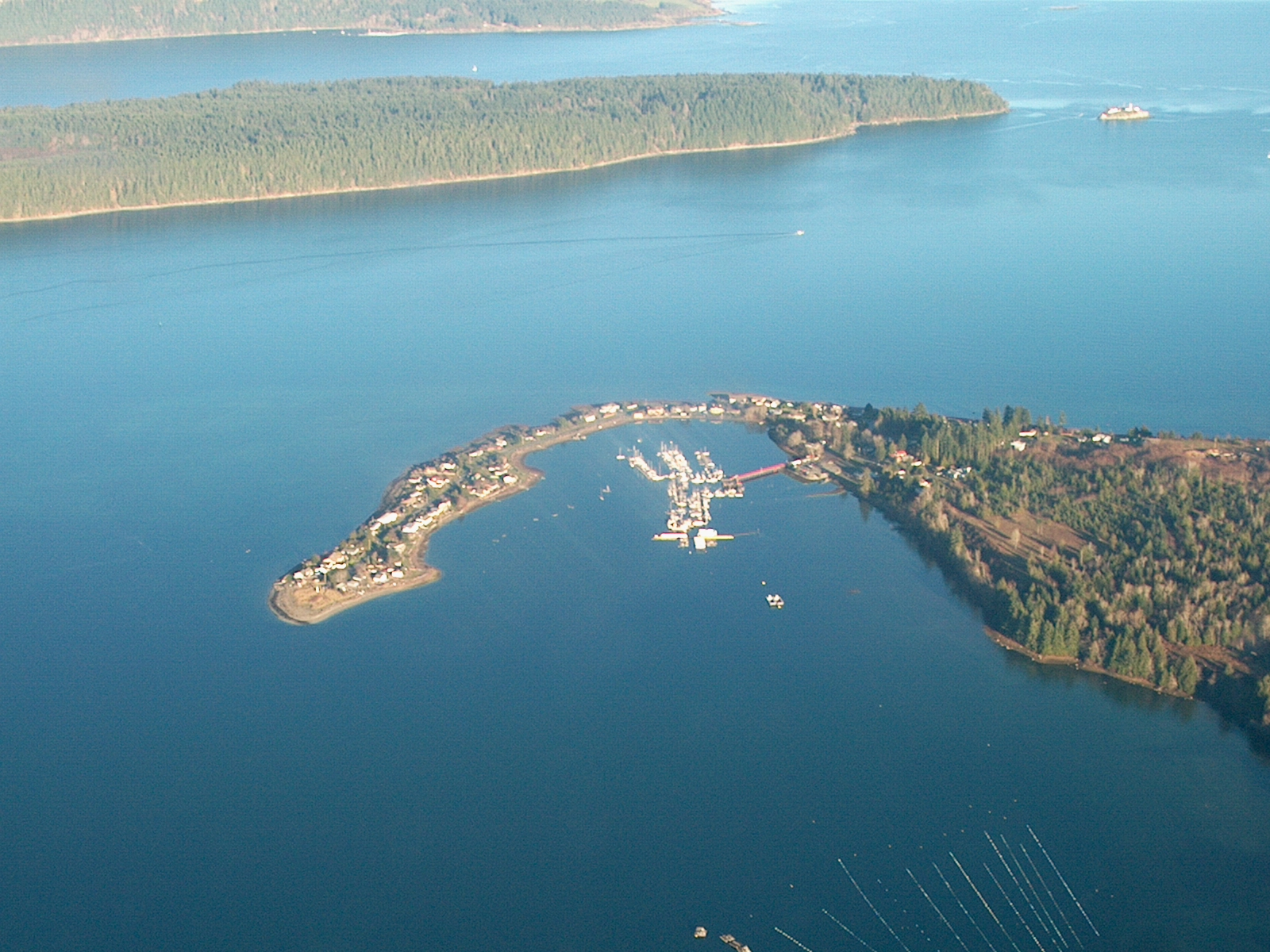
- Aerial view of Deep Bay Marina with Baynes Sound, Denman Island (Chrome Island Light off its tip) and Hornby Island in the background.

- Location of Deep Bay in British Columbia Deep Bay (British Columbia)
- Coordinates: 49°27′55″N 124°43′36″W
- Country: Canada
- Province: British Columbia
- Regional district: Nanaimo
- Time zone: UTC−07:00 (PT)
- Area codes: 250, 778

Deep Bay is an unincorporated area on the east coast of Vancouver Island, in British Columbia, Canada across Baynes Sound from Denman Island which has a government marina in a naturally protected harbour. It is situated on Highway 19A north of Qualicum Beach between Fanny Bay and Bowser.

The June 23, 1946 Vancouver Island earthquake shocked the Strait of Georgia region, causing the bottom of Deep Bay to sink between 2.7 m (9 ft) and 25.6 m (84 ft).

Deep Bay is the home of the Deep Bay Marine Field Station.

The Island Rail Corridor passes through the area, although there is no longer a train service in operation.

== History ==
In the 1920s, a Japanese-Canadian man, Eikichi Kagetsu, purchased 885 acres of timberlands in Deep Bay, and subsequently incorporated Deep Bay Logging Co. He operated the company there, as well as in Fanny Bay, until he was interned by the Canadian government during World War II. The company was sold by the government, without his consent, to the H.R. MacMillan Export Company.
