= True Evil =

True Evil may refer to:

- The 2006 novel by Greg Iles
- Character Alignment (role-playing games)
- The embodied form of the devil, harming the world around him.
