= Quinitsa =

Ship built in 1977

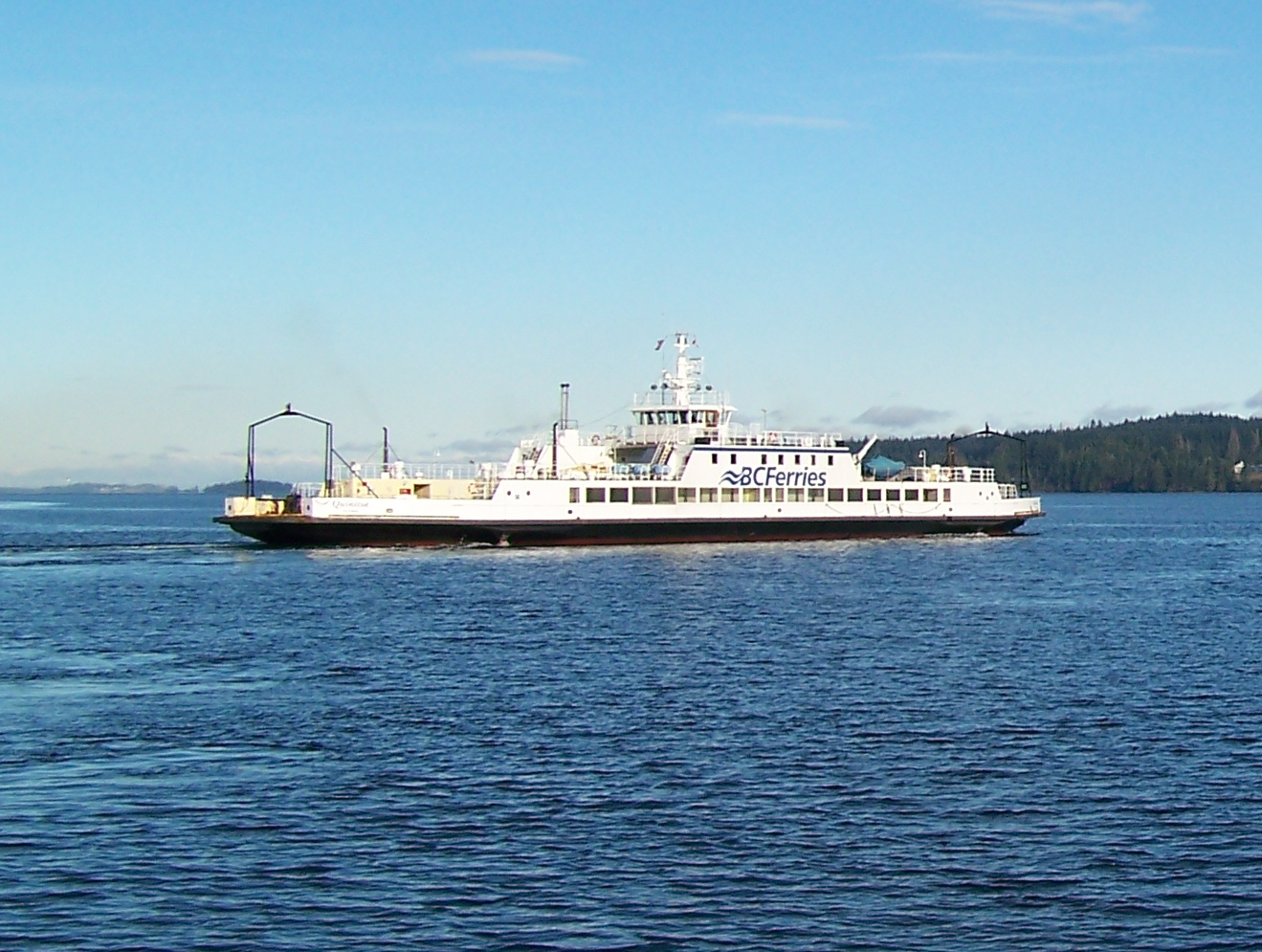
- Quinitsa at Buckley Bay (2007)

History

Canada
- Name: Quinitsa
- Namesake: Kwinitsa River
- Owner: Ministry of Transportation and Highways
- Operator: Ministry of Transportation and Highways (1977-1982), BC Ferries (1982-1983), Ministry of Transportation and Highways (1983-1985)
- Route: 1977-1982: Nanaimo Harbour ↔ Gabriola Island; 1983-present: Buckley Bay ↔ Denman Island
- Builder: Vancouver Shipyards, North Vancouver
- Completed: 1977
- In service: 1977
- Identification: IMO number: 7710965
- Fate: Transferred to BC Ferries in 1985

Canada
- Name: Quinitsa
- Owner: British Columbia Ferry Services Inc.
- Operator: British Columbia Ferry Services Inc.
- Route: 1983-present: Buckley Bay ↔ Denman Island
- Acquired: 1985
- Refit: 2008
- Identification: IMO number: 7710965; MMSI number: 316001265; Callsign: CZ8734
- Status: in active service

General characteristics
- Class & type: Q-class ferry
- Tonnage: 1,107.59 GT
- Displacement: 1,099 t (1,082 long tons)
- Length: 74.68 m (245 ft 0 in)
- Beam: 19.51 m (64 ft 0 in)
- Installed power: 1,899 hp (1,416 kW)
- Speed: 10 knots (19 km/h)
- Capacity: 392 passengers; 50 cars
- Crew: 6
- Notes: Sources:

Quinitsa is an automobile ferry operated by BC Ferries. It was built in 1977 by Vancouver Shipyards in Vancouver, British Columbia. The ferry was originally part of the Ministry of Transportation and Highways' (MoT) saltwater ferry fleet until 1985, when the MoT's saltwater ferries—including Quinitsa—were transferred to BC Ferries.

The 50-car Quinitsa began service in 1977 on the Nanaimo Harbour ↔ Gabriola Island ferry route, replacing the 30-car Kahloke. Like her predecessor, the Quinitsa soon became too small and in June 1982, the larger 70-car Quinsam entered service, replacing Quinitsa. For the rest of 1982 and for most of 1983, she was loaned to BC Ferries. She operated on a variety of routes, including Horseshoe Bay ↔ Bowen Island, Swartz Bay ↔ Fulford Harbour, and she also served the Gulf Islands from Swartz Bay. Upon returning to the MoT, she was placed on the Buckley Bay ↔ Denman Island route until 2019, when she replaced the Howe Sound Queen on the Crofton ↔ Vesuvius Bay (Salt Spring Island) route and remains there on a temporary basis as of 2024.

In 2008, she received a mid-life upgrade where she received new engines and generators, as well as a rebuilt bridge structure and a refurbished passenger cabin. In 2018, when unscheduled repairs to Queen of Cumberland required Skeena Queen to carry traffic between Pender Island and Swartz Bay in addition to between Fulford Harbour and Swartz Bay, Quinitsa was stationed at Fulford Harbour to provide additional sailings during peak demand on those routes, and to handle some dangerous cargo sailings.
