= Cable ferry =

Ferry that is guided and propelled by cables

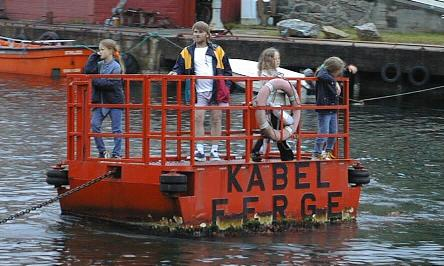
Coin-operated cable ferry at Espevær in Bømlo, Norway

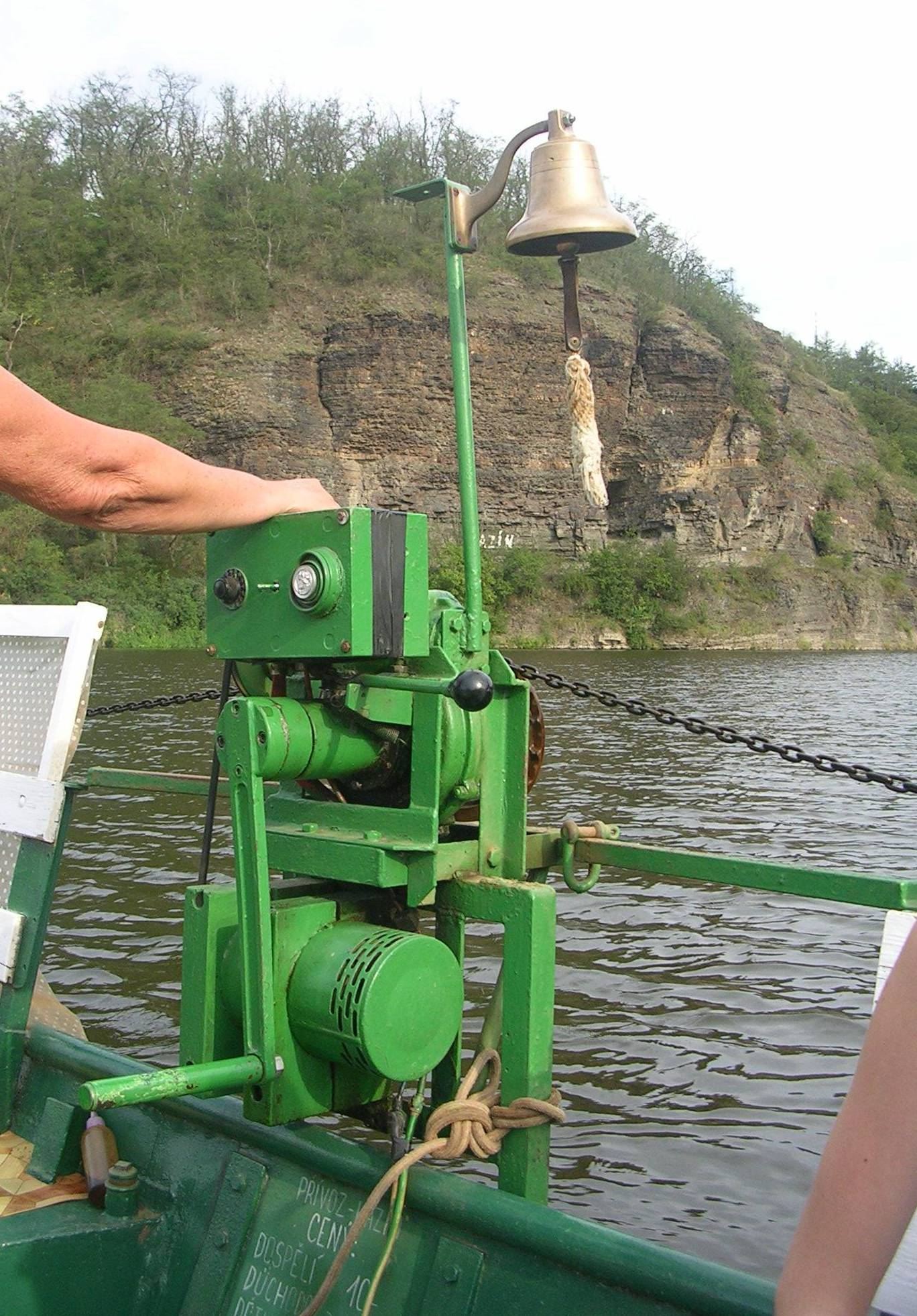
Chain-pulling engine of a small ferry on Berounka river near Prague, Czech Republic

Cable ferry between Ekerö and Adelsö, Sweden

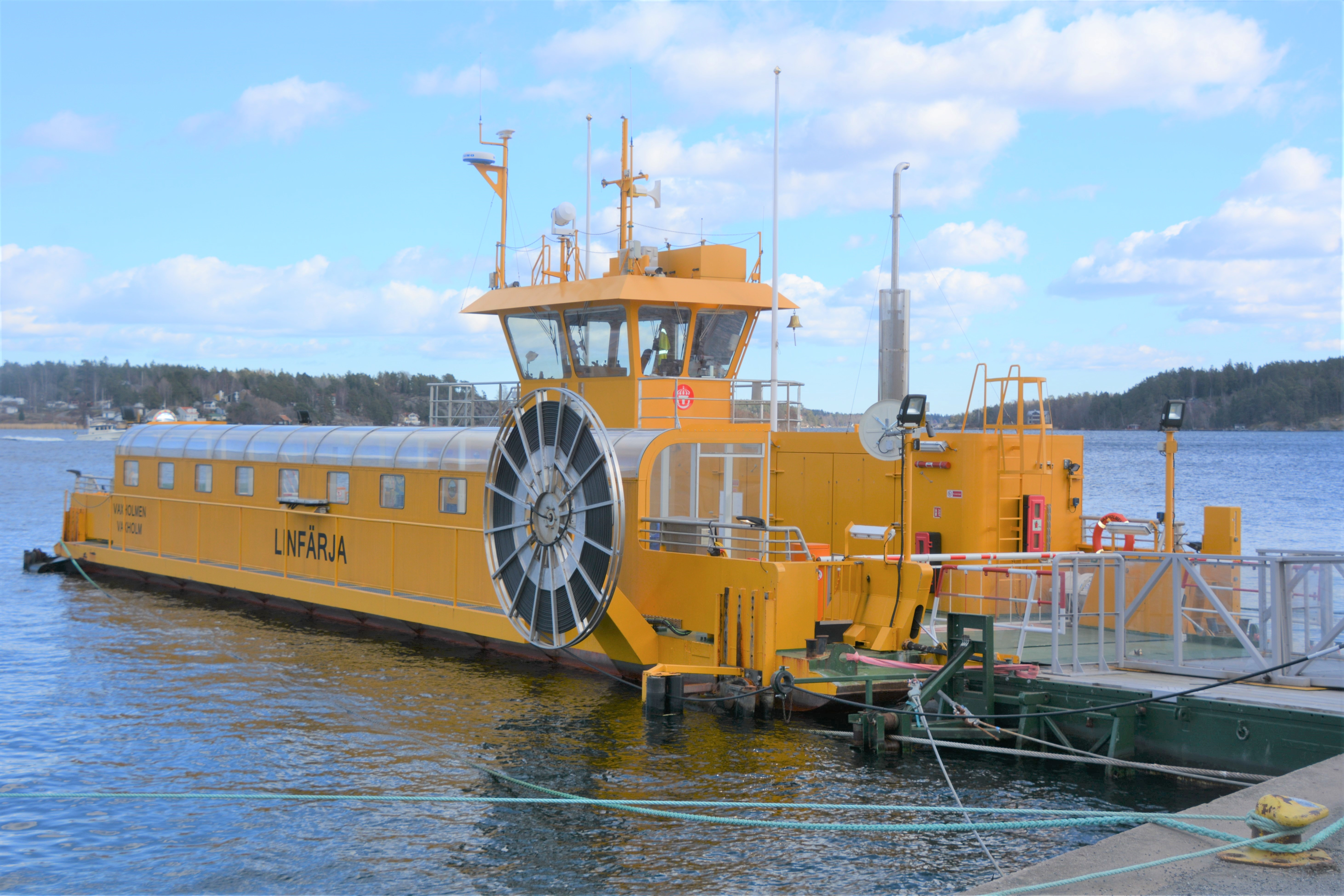
Cable ferry in Vaxholm, Sweden

A cable ferry (including the types chain ferry, rope ferry, swing ferry, floating bridge, or punt) is a ferry that is guided (and in many cases propelled) across a river or large body of water by cables connected to both shores. The earliest examples date from the 13th century, and often used either rope or steel chains. These were largely replaced by wire cable by the late 19th century. Cable ferries use relatively little energy, but can hinder other craft.

== History ==
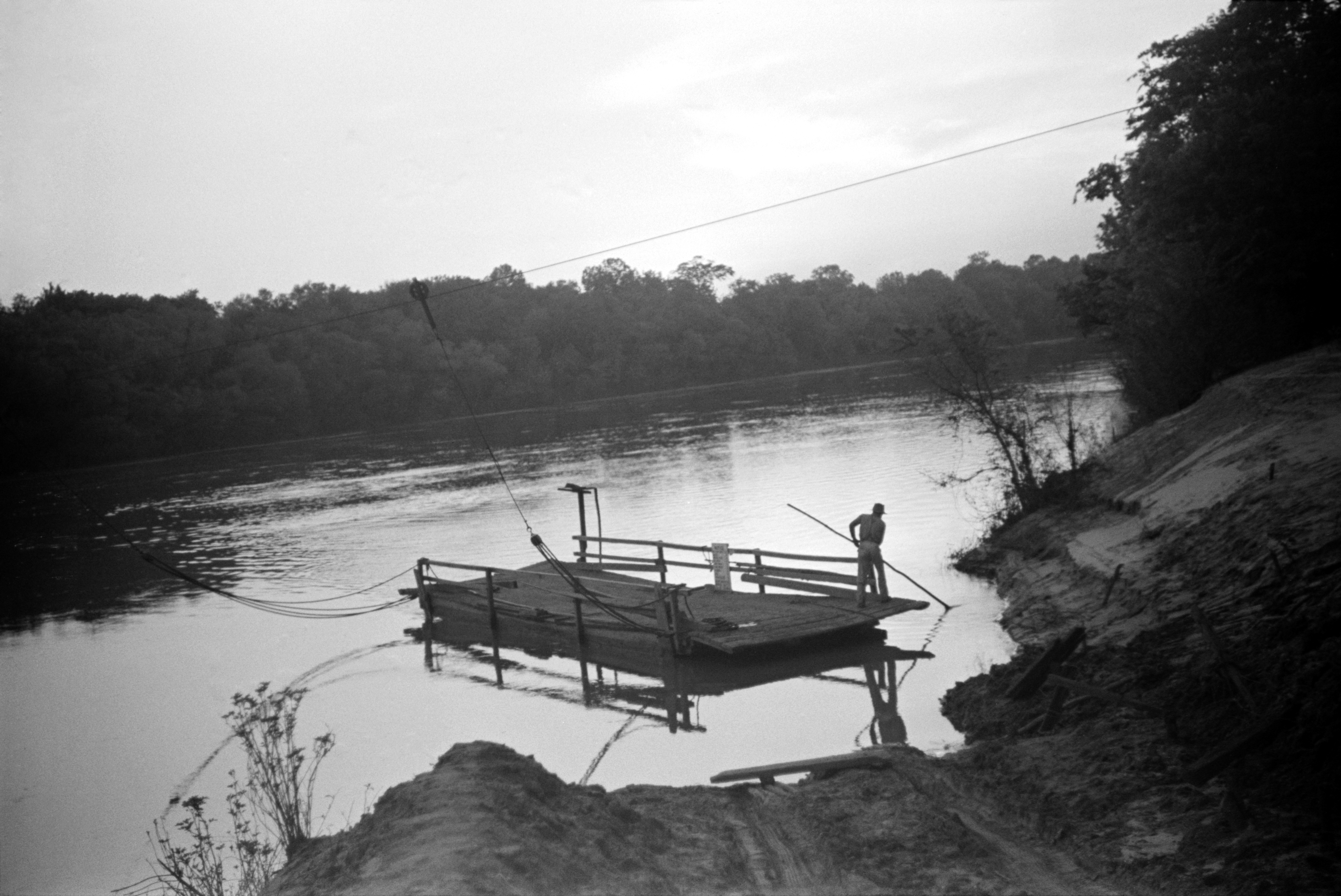
Simple cable ferry, Gee's Bend, Alabama, 1939

Cable ferries have probably been used to cross rivers and similar bodies of water since before recorded history. Examples of ferry routes using this technology date back to the 13th century (Hampton Ferry in England).

In 1831 James Meadows Rendel introduced chain ferries worked by steam and in 1832 constructed one crossing the Dart at Dartmouth. Between 1832 and 1836 similar chain ferries were implemented between Torpoint and Saltash across the Tamar, and between Woolston and Southampton across the Itchen. The Woolston Floating Bridge switched from chains to wire ropes between 1878 and 1887 and was replaced by a bridge in 1977.

In the early 1900s, Canadian engineer William Pitt designed an underwater cable ferry in New Brunswick, which would later be installed on the Kennebecasis River in order to connect the Kingston Peninsula to the Kennebecasis Valley. There are now eight cable ferries along the Saint John River system in southern New Brunswick. In Canada a cable ferry is proposed to transport automobiles across the Ottawa River in Ontario. There are several in British Columbia: two on the Fraser, one at Lytton, one at Big Bar (reaction ferries), three on Arrow Lakes. A suspended cable ferry worked until the 1980s in Boston Bar. A small seasonal reaction ferry carries cars across the Rivière des Prairies from Laval, Quebec (Sainte-Dorothée neighbourhood) to Île Bizard (part of Montreal).

Cable ferries were particularly prominent in early transportation in the Sacramento Delta of California. Dozens of cable ferries operated on the Columbia River in the US northwest, and most have been rendered obsolete by bridges. A suspended cable ferry for railway cars crossed the American River in Northern California.

Most of the road crossings of the Murray River in South Australia are cable ferries operated by the state government using diesel engines. The platforms at the ends can be moved up or down according to the water level. At one time, cable ferries were a primary means of automobile transportation in New South Wales in Australia. In Tasmania, for a century before 1934, the Risdon Punt at Hobart was the only fixed method of crossing the Derwent River within Hobart city limits.

In the fishing village of Tai O on Lantau Island, Hong Kong, the Tai O Ferry (橫水渡) crossed the Tai O River before a bascule bridge was built.

The largest and busiest cable ferry is the Torpoint Ferry in Plymouth, England. It was first converted to cable operation in 1831 and currently operates 3 ferries, carrying 8000 vehicles per day.

The longest cable ferry link is Baynes Sound Connector south of Courtenay, British Columbia, Canada with a length of 1961.48 metres.

== Types ==
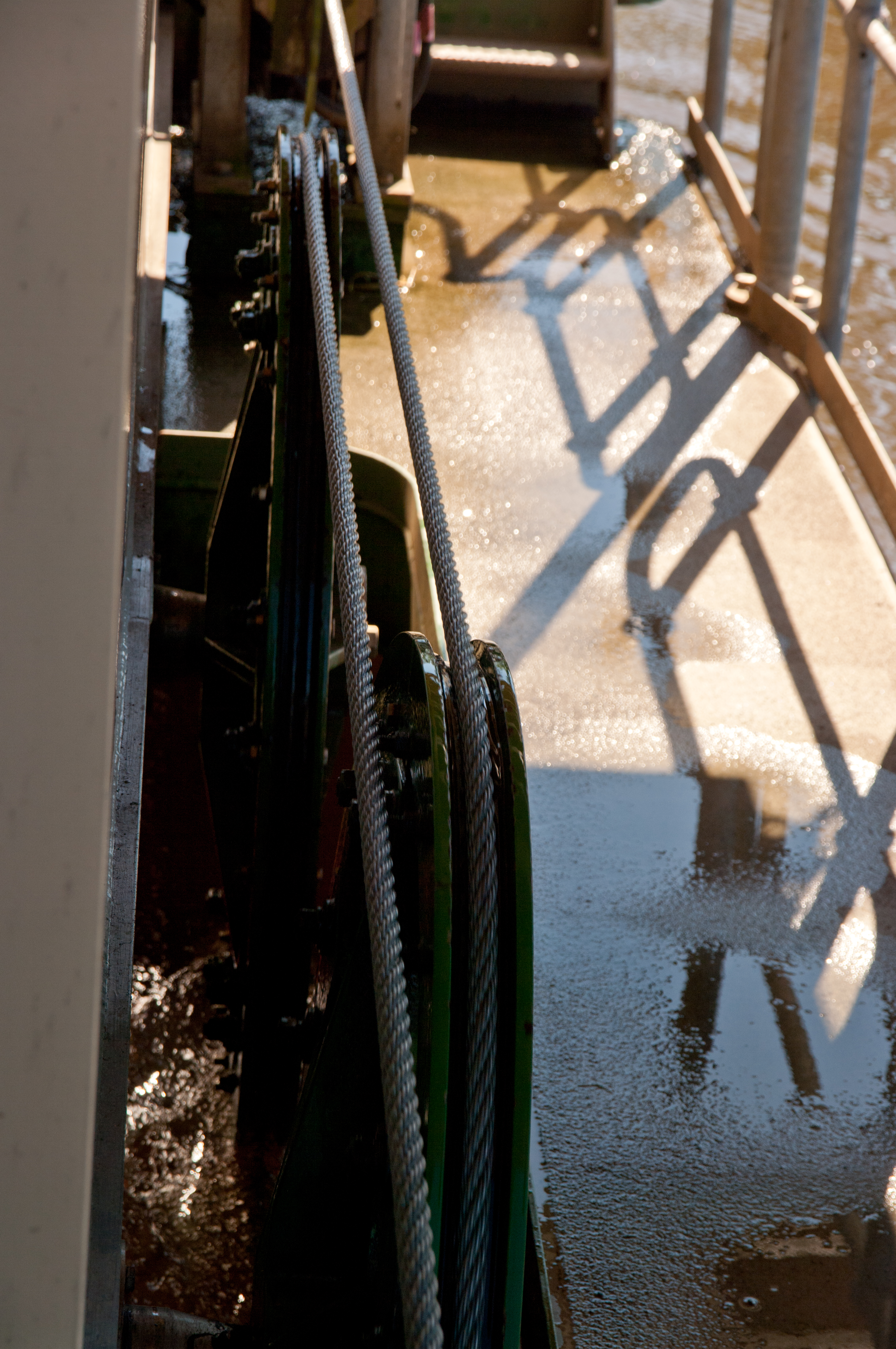
Winding mechanism on the Sackville Ferry in New South Wales, Australia

Cable ferries can be typified by their size and construction, their usage (passenger, animal, vehicle) and requirements (length of crossing, amount of other shipping), their cables (wire rope, chain, or both), and their propulsion (water current, engine, manual).

The choice of cable depends partially on the requirements of the crossing but also on the historical context. For example, the numerous cable ferries across Australian and Canadian rivers seem to use wire rope exclusively, whereas the older crossings across busy tidal rivers in England all use chain. In Germany, several river crossings were originally reaction ferries and later kept a wire rope for holding position but introduced a chain for propulsion.

The reaction ferry uses the power of the river to tack across the current; the powered cable ferry uses engines or electric motors (e.g., the Canby Ferry in the U.S. State of Oregon) to wind itself across; or is hand-operated, such as the Stratford-upon-Avon chain ferry in the UK and the Saugatuck Chain Ferry in Saugatuck, Michigan, United States.

Powered cable ferries use powered wheels or drums on board the vessel to pull itself along by the cables. The chains or wire ropes can be used with a sufficient amount of slack to allow sinking below the surface as the ferry moves away, allowing other vessels to pass without becoming snared or trapped. Chain ferries in strong tidal currents use two chains, those in inland rivers often only one chain on the upstream side. Some cable ferries use a wire rope on the upstream side in order to hold the position and a chain on the downstream side for propulsion.

A special type are electrically powered overhead-cable ferries like Straussee Ferry, which have an onboard propulsion unit and can float free, but are connected to the overhead wire for the power supply, using an electrical cable that slides along the cable as the ferry moves.

A very rare type are cable-ferries that are not propelled by themselves but rather are pulled from land side. An example of such a cable ferry was the Kungälv – Fästningsholmen ferry in Sweden. Today, the Jonen ferry in the Netherlands is pulled by a winch on the banks. These cable ferries can be operated electrically without having to provide electricity by rechargeable batteries or an overhead wire. Saving the weight of the engine on board, these ferries can also be operated using less energy.

Two or more ferries can be provided in order to increase availability and capacity and as a backup during maintenance, as with the Torpoint Ferry.

== Ownership ==
The earliest punts were privately owned by local landowners, and charged a toll. As governments started to build roads, they started to build and operate punts as required. Private punts might be bought out, or made to impose more standard tolls.

== Energy requirements ==
The energy needed for operating cable ferries is in general especially small, as the crossing distances are mostly short, the speeds low, and there is almost no maneuvering. Whereas a free ferry is especially inefficient when starting off or moving slowly against a current or wind, a cable ferry is more or less rigidly connected to the ground with side forces held by the cable(s).

As the power to overcome the frictional drag of a displacement hull decreases with usually more than the third power of the speed, even the smallest amount of power can effect movement with enough leverage or if suitably geared down. The majority of the world's cable ferries are indeed manually propelled either with a crank turning a chain wheel or by pulling directly on a cable. For example, the Saugatuck Chain Ferry taking up to 24 passengers is cranked by a single person at about 0.3 m/s. The former cable ferry at Malgas in South Africa even carried several cars, pulled by a couple of men at a slow walking speed. Ferries of this size that were hand-operated, such as the Reedham Ferry, have since been motorised in order to reduce the level of hard work and increase the speed. For these and other ferries of up to 20 t or so displacement, typical installed motor power in kilowatts ranges from single figures to low double figures. For example, the 22 meter, 22 tonne Pritzerbe Ferry has 23 kW installed. This allows comparison with free ferries. The motor ferry "Luise" on the Wannsee near Berlin, of similar tonnage, size and construction, has 290 kW installed.

With electric drive the installed power requirements are reduced further. A very low-power installation is in the chain ferry Föri for up to 75 passengers. It uses battery-supplied twin electric motors. The average power during continuous operation (crossing two minutes and docking one minute) is given as 3 kW in summer and 4 kW in winter with thin ice, thus when moving 4.5 kW in summer and 6 kW in winter.

Side forces from strong water currents or winds are held by the cables, yet when moving introduce extra friction in these that can considerably exceed the water resistance. Also in deep water with heavy chains or long cables not lying on the ground, large tension forces with corresponding friction are created. The world's longest cable crossing, nearly 2 km with the 750 t Baynes Sound Connector uses three wire ropes pretensioned with 200 kN. In spite of careful planning, the expected large energy savings compared to the former free ferry are not realised, also due to fouling and a speed of 8.5 knots. 998 kW engine power is installed, in the former 1099 t Quinitsa it is 1416 kW.

With dependable water currents, most cable ferries are or were reaction ferries, powered by the current. Some of these are or were hybrid ferries with the cable passing through moveable pulleys or belaying points whose location sets the ferry's angle. In order to set off, manual work is required to initially pull the cable and also to maneuver, as described in the referenced video. Another hybrid seems to be the cable ferry at Sendelingsdrift with adjustable tethers to a high wire rope and also two outboard motors.

== Effect on navigation ==
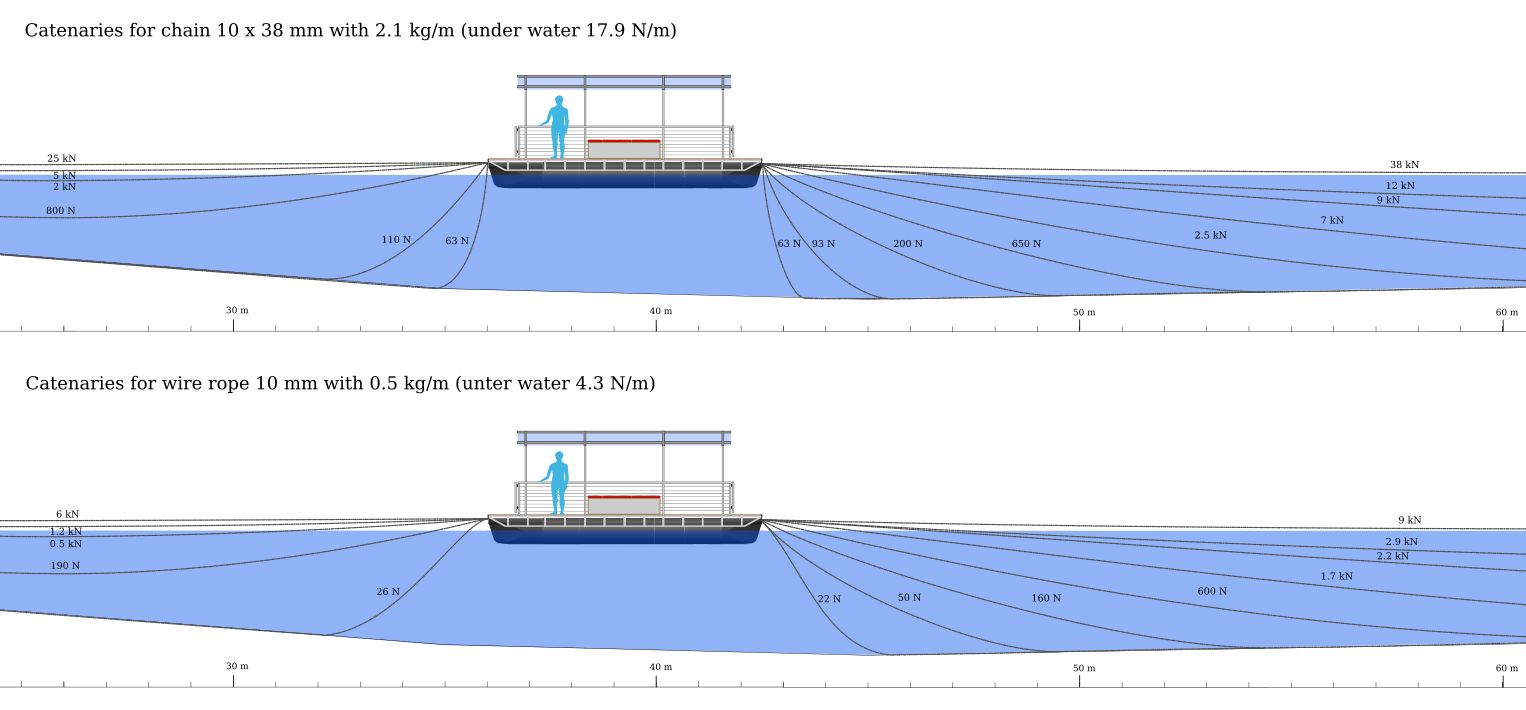
Possible forces and catenaries for a small cable ferry with chain or wire rope compared.

Cables can hinder other navigation or pose a hazard. Whether a risk exists, and to which degree, depends on the situation (nature of body of water and extent of shipping) and on the type of cable(s):

- Overhead wire ropes suspended over shipping height.
- Ropes suspended at operating level, permanently or temporarily.
- Ropes held on the water surface by buoys.
- Cables suspended underwater, permanently or temporarily.
- Ground cables normally resting on the bottom, pulled to the surface near the ferry.

Only the first type normally presents no risk for other vessels, as evident in the 15 reaction ferries of this type in Switzerland. Suspended cables near the water surface block navigation and are dangerous especially in strong currents and if difficult to see. The ropes of reaction ferries attached to one shore and suspended by buoys block the river on one side of the crossing ferry and can be made highly visible. The greatest risk comes from cables that are held underwater to a lesser degree than anticipated or are not visible at all.

Suspended cables (ferry to shore or to water bottom) form catenaries of a shape (entry angle and depth) that depends on the cable weight and amount of tension. Chains are in general rather heavy and can function even with very steep catenaries going to the bottom within very short distances, except very near the shore. As they are also easy to see, the risk to other navigation is usually minimal, as is evident with the 6 or so chain ferries in southern England operating in waters with heavy shipping. In strong water currents, the catenaries become more stretched and chain collisions have occurred. Wire ropes are lighter than chains of the same strength and may be operated under strong tension, both giving rise to shallow catenaries which may be difficult to judge or even see.

Some cable ferry operators warn vessel operators to exercise caution. They may indicate distances to keep clear, special lights, or that the depth of the cable is unknown, both when the ferry is stationary and when it is operating.

== See also ==
- Aerial tramway – Aerial cable shuttle transport
- Cable car (railway) – Cable-hauled mass transit system
- Funicular – Form of cable railway
- Pontoon (boat) – Float used to support a boat
- Punt (boat) – Flat-bottomed boat with square-cut bow
- Pünte
- Transporter bridge – Movable bridge that carries a segment of roadway across an obstacle
