= Bowser, British Columbia =

Town in British Columbia, Canada

Coordinates: 49°26′10″N 124°40′39″W

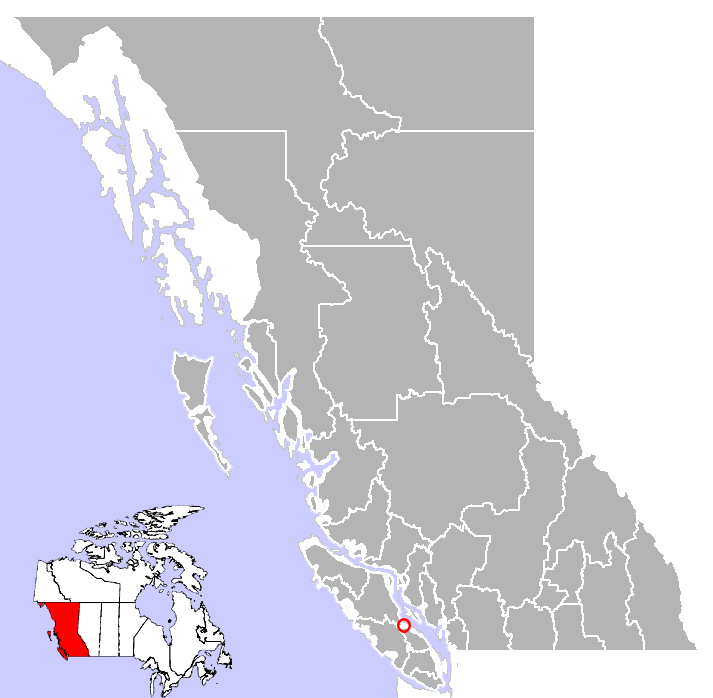
Location of Bowser, British Columbia

Bowser (/ˈbaʊzər/ BOUGH-zər) is a community on the east coast of Vancouver Island in British Columbia, Canada. It has a population of 1,729. Approximately 66 kilometres (41 mi) north of Nanaimo, Bowser is in a region informally known as Lighthouse Country, spanning a stretch of highway that extends from Qualicum Beach in the south to Horne Lake to the west and Fanny Bay in the north and east to Denman and Hornby Islands. Bowser is in the Regional District of Nanaimo and in its Electoral Area H, one of eight in the District. The community was named after William J. Bowser, premier of British Columbia from 1915 to 1916. Bowser is served by the coast-spanning Island Highway.

Bowser's local hotel was famous in the 1930s for a dog trained by his owners to deliver beer bottles to tables, receive the payment, and deliver change, a feat listed in "Ripley's Believe It or Not!".

Bowser has lent its name to a soil series which is widespread on eastern Vancouver Island. Bowser loamy sand is mapped under the whole community.

Near the community is the Bowser Ecological Reserve, which was established in 1996 to protect part of a productive forest ecosystem. While the 113-hectare ecological reserve was created for research purposes, including surveying species regenerating after a fire that occurred in the area over 100 years prior, it is open to the public for hiking.

== Sources ==
- "Bowser." Encyclopedia of British Columbia. 2000
- "Bowser, British Columbia, Canada". Britishcolumbia.com. Archived from the original on March 21, 2006.
