= Chrome Island =

Island in British Columbia, Canada

Coordinates: 49°28′20″N 124°41′4″W

Chrome Island is the site of a light station in the Salish Sea/Georgia Strait on the coast of Vancouver Island in an area known as Baynes Sound. It is 100 metres (330 ft) off the southeast tip of Denman Island and 3.5 kilometres (2.2 mi) east-northeast of the harbour at Deep Bay, British Columbia.

The island was known as Yellow Rock until 1940, when the name was changed to prevent confusion with a similarly named island. Archaeological studies have explored evidence of a pre-contact people there, including petroglyphs, human bones and a midden of discarded shells.

== Gallery ==
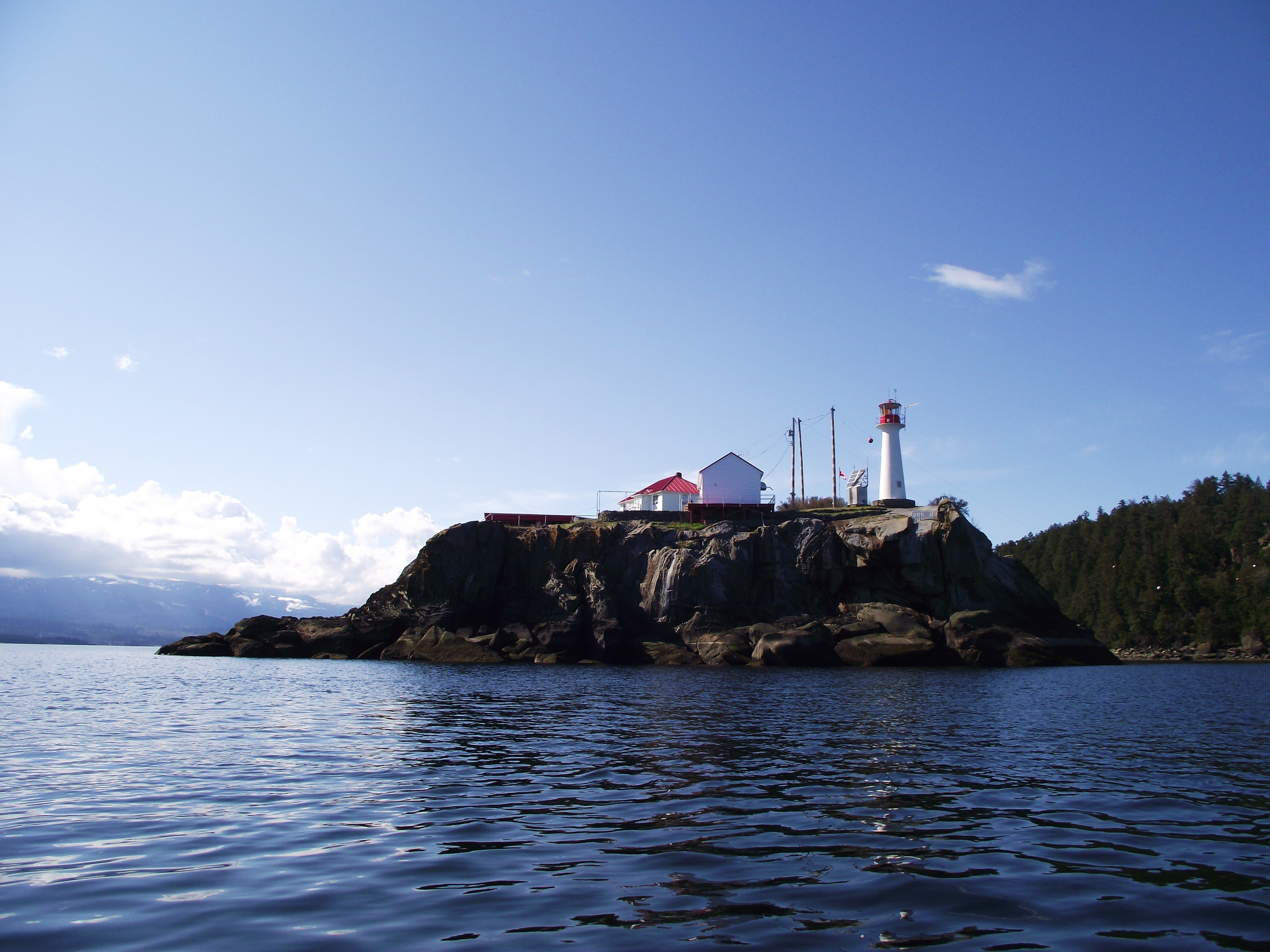
Chrome Island from the west

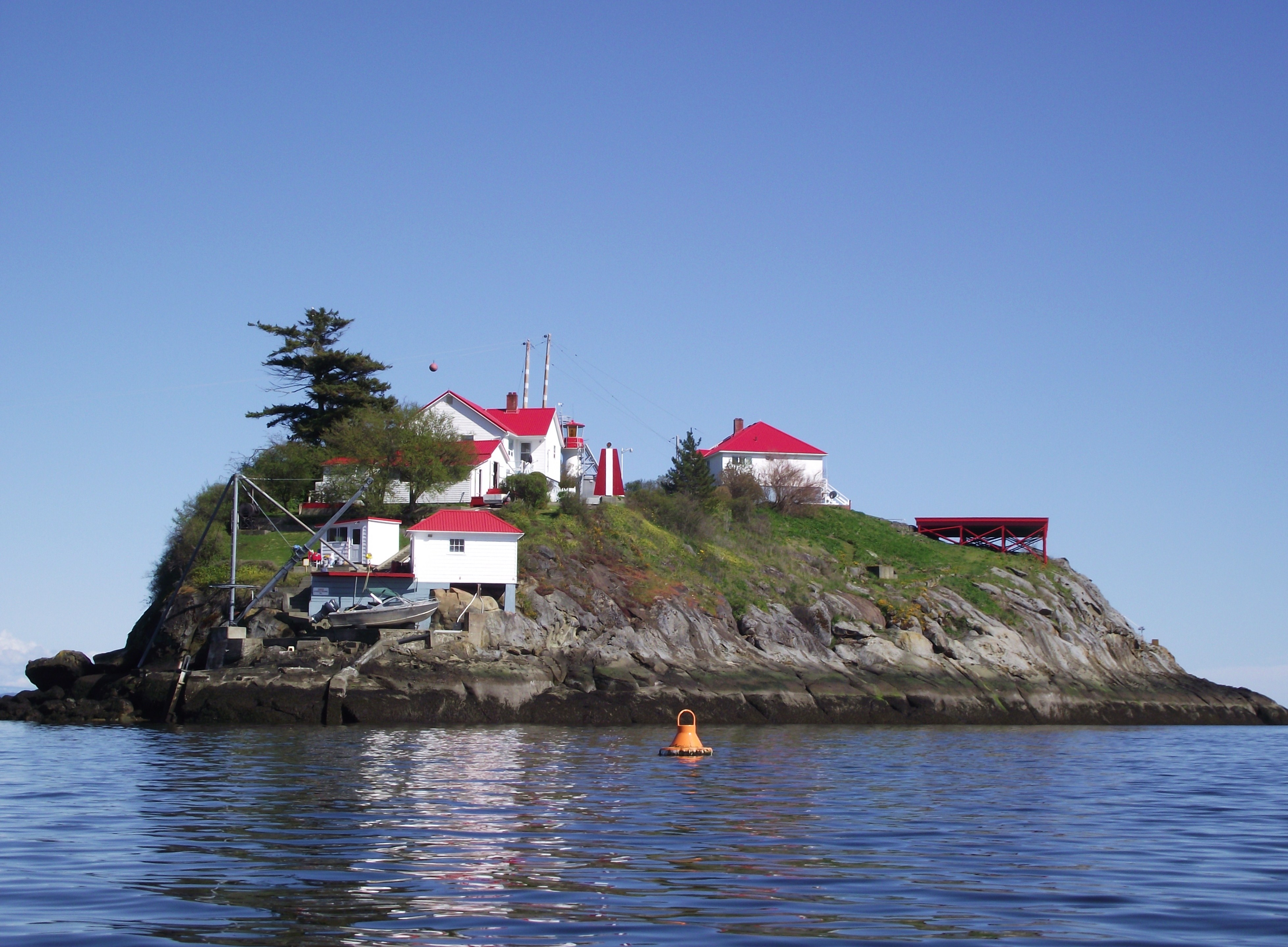
Chrome Island from the east

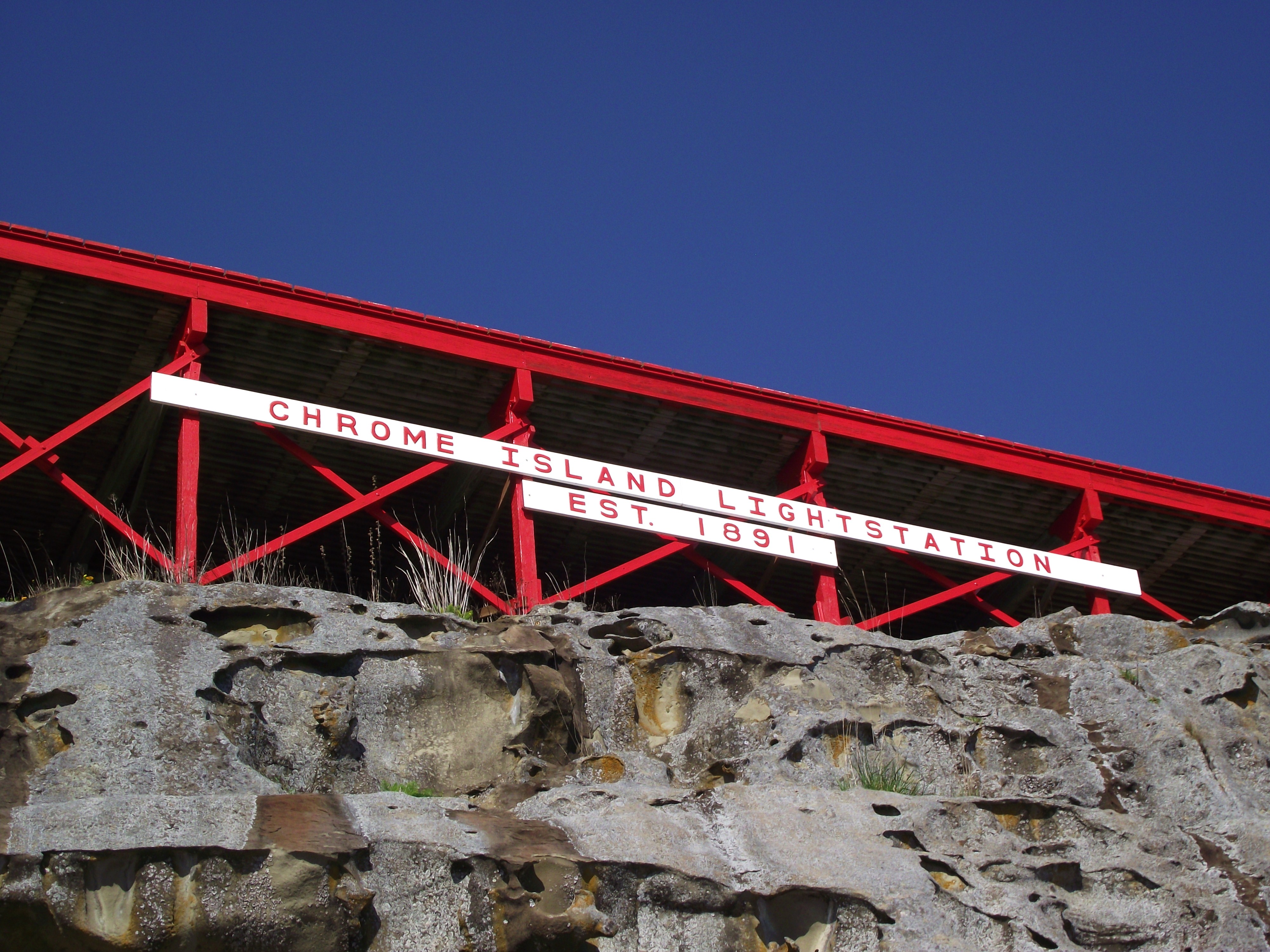
Chrome Island helicopter pad and sign

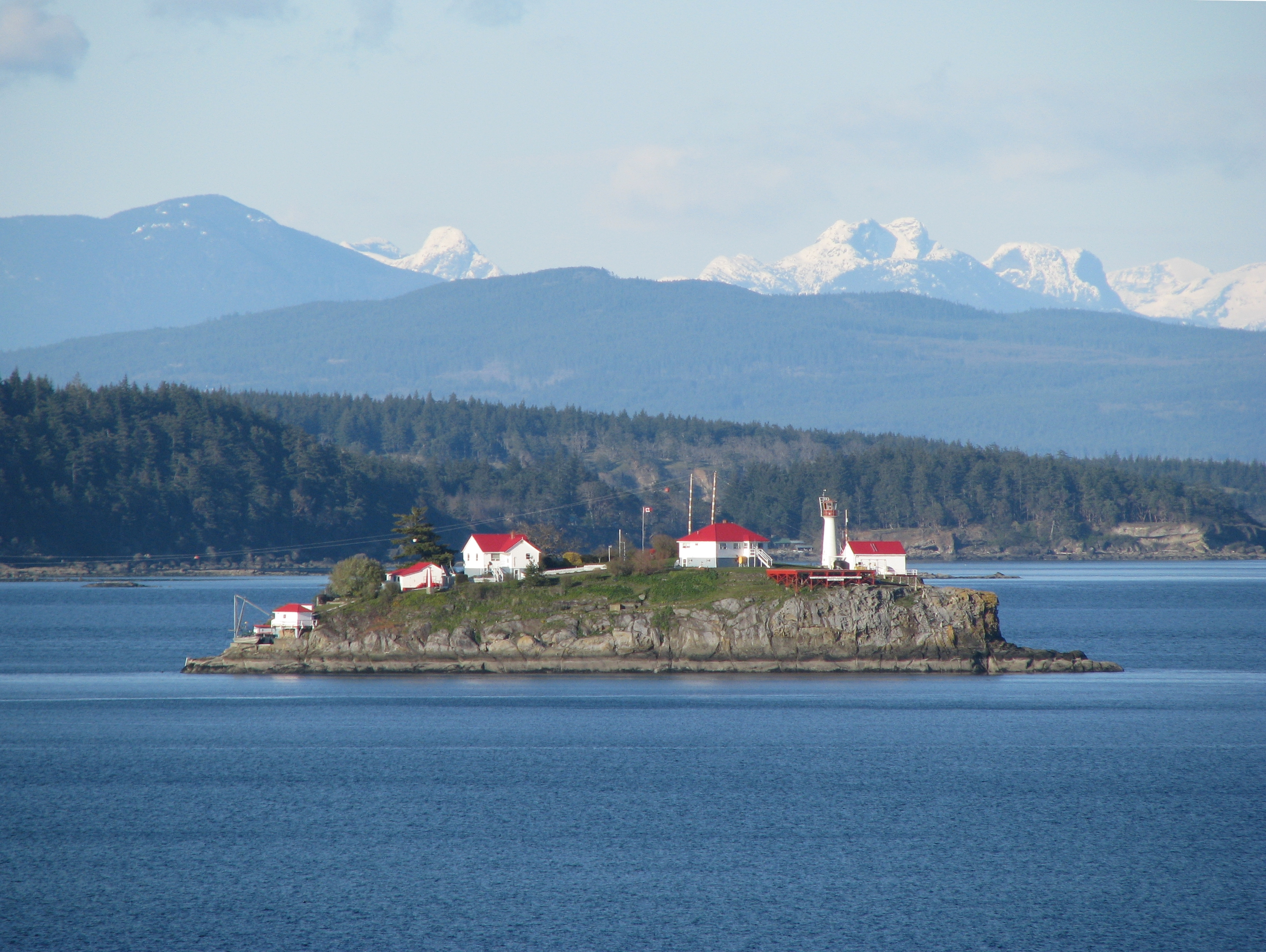
View of Island from Vancouver Island
