= Trapped (2002 film) =

- Theatrical release poster
- Directed by: Luis Mandoki
- Written by: Greg Iles
- Based on: 24 Hours by Greg Iles
- Produced by: Mark Canton; Luis Mandoki; Mimi Polk Gitlin
- Starring: Charlize Theron; Courtney Love; Stuart Townsend; Kevin Bacon; Pruitt Taylor Vince; Dakota Fanning
- Cinematography: Frederick Elmes; Piotr Sobociński
- Edited by: Gerald B. Greenberg
- Music by: John Ottman
- Production companies: Columbia Pictures; Senator Entertainment; Mandolin Entertainment; Propaganda Films
- Distributed by: Sony Pictures Releasing (North America); Senator Filmverleih (Germany)
- Release date: September 20, 2002
- Running time: 106 minutes
- Countries: United States; Germany
- Language: English
- Budget: $30 million
- Box office: $13.4 million

Trapped is a 2002 crime thriller film directed by Luis Mandoki and starring Charlize Theron, Courtney Love, Stuart Townsend, Kevin Bacon, Dakota Fanning, and Pruitt Taylor Vince. Based on Greg Iles' bestselling novel 24 Hours, it follows a wealthy Portland, Oregon, couple whose daughter is kidnapped by a mysterious man and his wife who demand a ransom for unclear reasons.

Filmed in British Columbia in the spring of 2001, Trapped was released theatrically by Columbia Pictures on September 20, 2002 to a critical and commercial flop.

== Plot ==
Dr. Will Jennings, a research physician, has landed his major career break by patenting a new anesthetic drug. After speaking at a conference regarding the patent in a Seattle hotel, he is met by a strange woman, Cheryl, who introduces herself as an admirer of his work. Cheryl attempts to seduce Will in the hallway, before holding him at gunpoint and forcing him into his hotel room. She demands a ransom for his young daughter, Abby. Meanwhile, Cheryl's husband, Joe, has broken into Will's luxurious Portland, Oregon home, and confronted Will's wife, Karen, who has returned after picking Abby up from school. Joe sends Abby away with his cousin, Marvin, while Karen attempts to fight the attack, but is ultimately thwarted when Joe holds her hostage at gunpoint.

Marvin drives Abby to a remote cabin in the woods, but soon discovers that Abby has asthma and is dependent on an inhaler. Abby begins to have an asthma attack, which causes Marvin to panic and phone Joe. Joe agrees to drive Karen to the cabin to administer the inhaler, blindfolding her for the car ride. An emotional Karen stops Abby's attack with the medication, but is quickly forced back into the car by Joe. Joe brings Karen back to her home, where she attempts to fight him, but he subdues her. When her neighbor, Joan, stops by unannounced, Karen is forced to pretend that she has been caught having an affair with Joe. After Joan leaves, Karen manages to slash Joe with a concealed scalpel and locks herself in the bathroom where she receives a phone call from Abby, who has snuck out of the cabin with Marvin's cell phone. The call is short-lived, however, as Marvin recaptures Abby, and Joe forces his way into the bathroom. With Karen under his control again, Joe makes her suture his wound.

At the hotel, Will manages to inject Cheryl with succinylcholine, paralyzing her and bringing her near the edge of death before he administers an antidote. Fearing for her life, Cheryl also loses her nerve, and admits to Will that she and Joe constructed the plot as revenge for their daughter, Katie, who died during a recent brain operation; Will assisted on Katie's surgery. When Will explains that he was wrongly implicated by the head surgeon in the negligence that caused Katie's death, Cheryl begins to sympathize with him, and agrees to botch the plan.

In the morning, Cheryl accompanies Will to a bank to retrieve the ransom money while they are monitored by police. Joe and Cheryl have a heated argument on the phone, in which it is revealed that Joe intended to keep Abby after receiving the ransom and raise her as his own daughter. Will and Cheryl board a seaplane to fly toward Portland, where Joe and Karen are embarking on Interstate 5 toward them to exchange the money; traveling behind them are Marvin and Abby in a separate SUV. Karen attacks Joe in the car, forcing them off the freeway. As Will and Cheryl fly over the freeway, they spot Joe's car, and land the seaplane on the road, causing a multi-car pileup. Marvin loses control of the SUV in the melee and crashes.

While Joe chastises Cheryl, Marvin orders Abby out of the car, and urges her to find her parents. Abby is briefly captured by Cheryl, but released when a physical fight ensues between Will and Joe, which ultimately ends with Karen shooting Joe to death. Police and agents of the FBI descend on the scene as Abby suffers another asthma attack, but Karen is able to treat her with the inhaler. Cheryl is captured by police as Karen, Will, and Abby embrace.

== Cast ==
- Charlize Theron as Karen Jennings
- Courtney Love as Cheryl Hickey
- Stuart Townsend as Dr. Will Jennings
- Kevin Bacon as Joe Hickey
- Dakota Fanning as Abigail Jennings
- Pruitt Taylor Vince as Marvin
- Colleen Camp as Joan Evans
- Garry Chalk as Agent Chalmers
- Jodie Markell as Mary McDill
- Gerry Becker as Dr. Stein
- Andrew Airlie as Holden

== Production ==
=== Development ===
Writer Greg Iles wrote the screenplay for the film, adapting it from his own novel, 24 Hours. In the novel, the character of Abby was written as having type 1 diabetes and in need of insulin to survive the duration of her ransom kidnapping; in the film, however, the character was rewritten to have asthma instead, as the 2002 film Panic Room also featured a diabetic child character in a similar circumstance.

=== Casting ===
Courtney Love stated that she was compelled to play the role of Cheryl for the opportunity to work with director Luis Mandoki. "I know why I did that movie—[the director] Luis Mandoki. I asked Jennifer Lopez; I asked Andy Garcia. I asked people that had been in Luis Mandoki movies because I didn’t want to make the same mistake and not have a really good connection with my director ever again. Luis was fantastic, and he got the best reports from other actors."

=== Filming ===
Principal photography of Trapped, originally titled 24 Hours, began in Vancouver, British Columbia on March 19, 2001, and concluded on June 13 of that year.

Cinematographer Piotr Sobociński died from a heart attack a week into filming, with Frederick Elmes acting as replacement for the remaining of the shoot; Sobociński received a posthumous credit, while sharing it with Elmes. The movie was also dedicated to Sobociński.

The climactic freeway sequence was shot on Highway 19 near the Courtenay/Cumberland interchange at Buckley Bay, between May 22 and June 5.

== Release ==
Trapped was released theatrically in the United States on September 20, 2002, opening in 2,227 theaters.

=== Home media ===
Trapped was released on DVD by Columbia/TriStar Home Entertainment on December 24, 2002. It was subsequently issued on Blu-ray by Mill Creek Entertainment as a double feature with In the Cut. Mill Creek finally released the standalone Blu-ray on April 7, 2020.

== Reception ==
=== Box office ===
During its opening weekend, Trapped earned $3,210,765. It remained in theatrical release for 103 days domestically, ultimately grossing $7,073,251 in the United States. It earned a further $6,341,165 in international markets, making for a worldwide gross of $13,414,416.

=== Critical response ===
On the film-critic aggregator Rotten Tomatoes, Trapped earned 17% positive reviews based on 58 reviews. The site's consensus reads: "With its plot about child kidnapping and endangerment, Trapped is an exploitative thriller, more queasy than suspenseful." Metacritic, which uses a weighted average, assigned the film a score of 42 out of 100, based on 15 critics, indicating "mixed or average" reviews. Audiences polled by CinemaScore gave the film an average grade of "B−" on an A+ to F scale.

Lisa Schwarzbaum of Entertainment Weekly called the film "a negligible work of manipulation, an exploitation piece doing its usual worst to guilt-trip parents." She felt "The most frightening sight, though, is that of Theron and Bacon, good actors trapped in the muck of making a living." Robert K. Elder of the Chicago Tribune wrote: "Excellent abduction films such as Breakdown and the original The Vanishing maintain a sense of danger and claustrophobia by keeping the conflicts mostly internal, turning up the temperature under a fluctuating tone of emotional duress. Trapped splashes its drama all over the screen, subjecting its audience and characters to action that feels not only manufactured, but also so false you can see the filmmakers' puppet strings."

Philip French of The Guardian deemed the film "a calculatedly nasty thriller," adding that the "climax on a busy four-lane highway is worse than absurd— it's badly staged."

One of the few critics who gave a favorable review was Megan Turner of the New York Post who described the film as "a tightly drawn, propulsive thriller with some pleasingly unexpected kinks in the tale and a couple of believable performances from Charlize Theron and Kevin Bacon in the leads." Cynthia Fuchs of PopMatters gave the film a mixed review, noting it as predictable, but praised Courtney Love's performance as "effectively creepy, even more effectively abused and abusive, and unnervingly mushy."
