= Baynes Sound =

Sound in British Columbia, Canada

Coordinates: 49°32′0″N 124°50′0″W

Baynes Sound is the channel between Denman Island and Vancouver Island, British Columbia, Canada. The sound is a narrow western offshoot of the Strait of Georgia that separates Vancouver Island from the mainland of British Columbia. The area is actively harvested by the local oyster industry, as is apparent by an abundance of oyster farms. It produces 39% of the oysters and 55% of the manila clams farmed in British Columbia. The sound is 40 km (25 mi) long and is 3.5 km (2.2 mi) wide at its widest point, although the average width is less than 2 km (1.2 mi). The southern boundary lies around Chrome Island, a small island off Boyle Point, the southern tip of Denman. The northern boundary is less defined, but lies between Tree Island at the northern end of Denman and the Comox harbour. The sound is dotted with the small communities of (north to south) Royston, Union Bay, Buckley Bay, Mud Bay, Fanny Bay, and Deep Bay on Vancouver Island. The crossing is served by the BC Ferries ship Baynes Sound Connector, between Buckley Bay and Denman Island. Baynes Sound is named after British Rear Admiral Robert L. Baynes, who commanded the Pacific Squadron from 1857 to 1860. Baynes Sound is the home of Vancouver Island University Center for Shellfish Research's Deep Bay Marine Field Station.

Baynes Sound is the safest route by boats into Comox Harbour, avoiding the shallow Comox Bar between Denman Island and the Comox Peninsula.

== Panorama ==
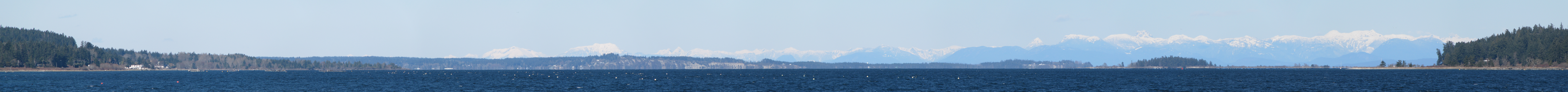
A panorama of Baynes Sound looking north from Buckley Bay with Vancouver Island to the left, the bluffs of Cape Lazo in the middle, mountains surrounding Desolation Sound in the distance across the Strait of Georgia and Denman Island to the right. The round island in the middle beyond the red nun buoy is Sandy Island.
