= Penn Cage =

- First appearance: The Quiet Game
- Last appearance: Southern Man
- Created by: Greg Iles

In-universe information
- Gender: Male
- Occupation: Prosecutor, author, mayor
- Spouse: Sarah Cage
- Children: Annie Cage
- Relatives: Dr. Tom Cage

Penn Cage is a fictional prosecutor turned writer created by author Greg Iles in his novel The Quiet Game (1999). Cage also appears in Iles' novels Turning Angel (2005), and The Devil's Punchbowl (2009), and the novella The Death Factory (2014). He appeared in the trilogy of Natchez Burning (2014), The Bone Tree (2015), and Mississippi Blood (2017). He also makes minor appearances in Sleep No More (2002) and True Evil (2006). His last appearance is in Southern Man (2024).

== Background ==
=== The Quiet Game ===
Penn Cage is first introduced at Walt Disney World with his four-year-old daughter Annie. It is revealed that his wife, Sarah, died seven months prior. Cage was previously a prosecuting attorney in Houston, Texas, where he was involved in the trial and conviction of white supremacist Arthur Lee Hanratty, making himself an enemy in the form of John Portman, fictional FBI director. Cage decides to spend some time in his childhood home, Natchez, Mississippi, so that his parents can help him deal with his and Annie's grief. Cage gets involved in investigating the murder of Delano Payton in 1968, which leads him to reunite with former lover, Olivia "Livy" Marston, who has haunted him since her mysterious disappearance after their high-school graduation. With the help of newspaper heiress Caitlin Masters, Cage tries to link Livy's father Leo, to the murder, all the while rediscovering the secrets and intrigue of the town in which he grew up.
