= Quinsam =

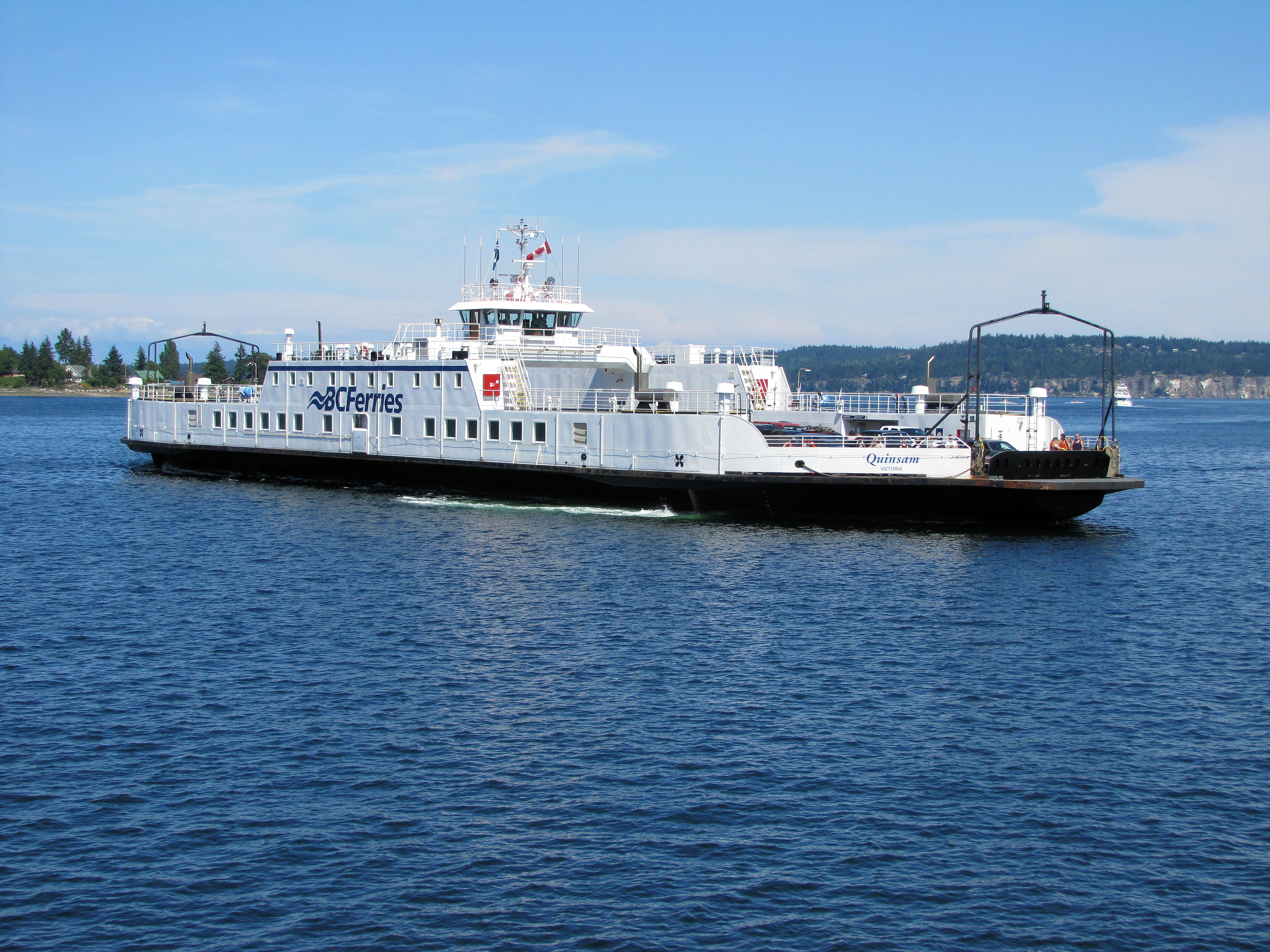

History

Canada
- Name: Quinsam
- Namesake: Quinsam River
- Owner: Ministry of Transportation and Highways (1982–1985); BC Ferries (1985–present)
- Operator: Ministry of Transportation and Highways (1982–1985); BC Ferries (1985–present)
- Route: 1982–2022: Nanaimo Harbour ↔ Gabriola Island; 2022–present: Crofton ↔ Vesuvius
- Builder: Vancouver Shipyards, North Vancouver
- Completed: 1982
- In service: 1982
- Refit: 2010
- Home port: Victoria
- Identification: IMO number: 8111386; MMSI number: 316001266; Callsign: VY6800
- Notes: Transferred to BC Ferries in 1985

General characteristics
- Type: Q-class ferry
- Tonnage: 1458.59
- Displacement: 1431 tonnes
- Length: 86.85 m (284 ft 11 in)
- Beam: 21.24 m (69 ft 8 in)
- Installed power: 2,601 hp (1,940 kW)
- Speed: 10 knots (19 km/h)
- Capacity: 400 passengers; 70 cars
- Crew: 7
- Notes: Sources:

Quinsam is an automobile ferry operated by BC Ferries. It was built in 1982 by Vancouver Shipyards in Vancouver, British Columbia. Initially, the ferry was part of the Ministry of Transportation and Highways' (MoT) saltwater ferry fleet until 1985, when it was transferred to BC Ferries along with other saltwater ferries, such as Quinsam.

Quinsam carries 70 cars and replaced the smaller Quinitsa (which carries fifty cars) on the Nanaimo ↔ Gabriola Island route, and then once again on the Vesuvius ↔ Crofton route in 2022.

Quinsam has few passenger amenities onboard. On each side of the car deck, there are small passenger lounges offering some seating, along with washrooms and vending machines. In 2010, she underwent a $16 million mid-life upgrade, which included new engines and generators, a rebuilt pilothouse and passenger cabin, as well as steel replacement.

On May 26, 2025, BC Ferries announced that Quinsam will be retired upon the introduction of Island-class two-vessel service on the Crofton-Vesuvius route, in 2027.
