= Baynes Sound Connector =

Cable Ferry Connecting Vancouver Island and Denman Island

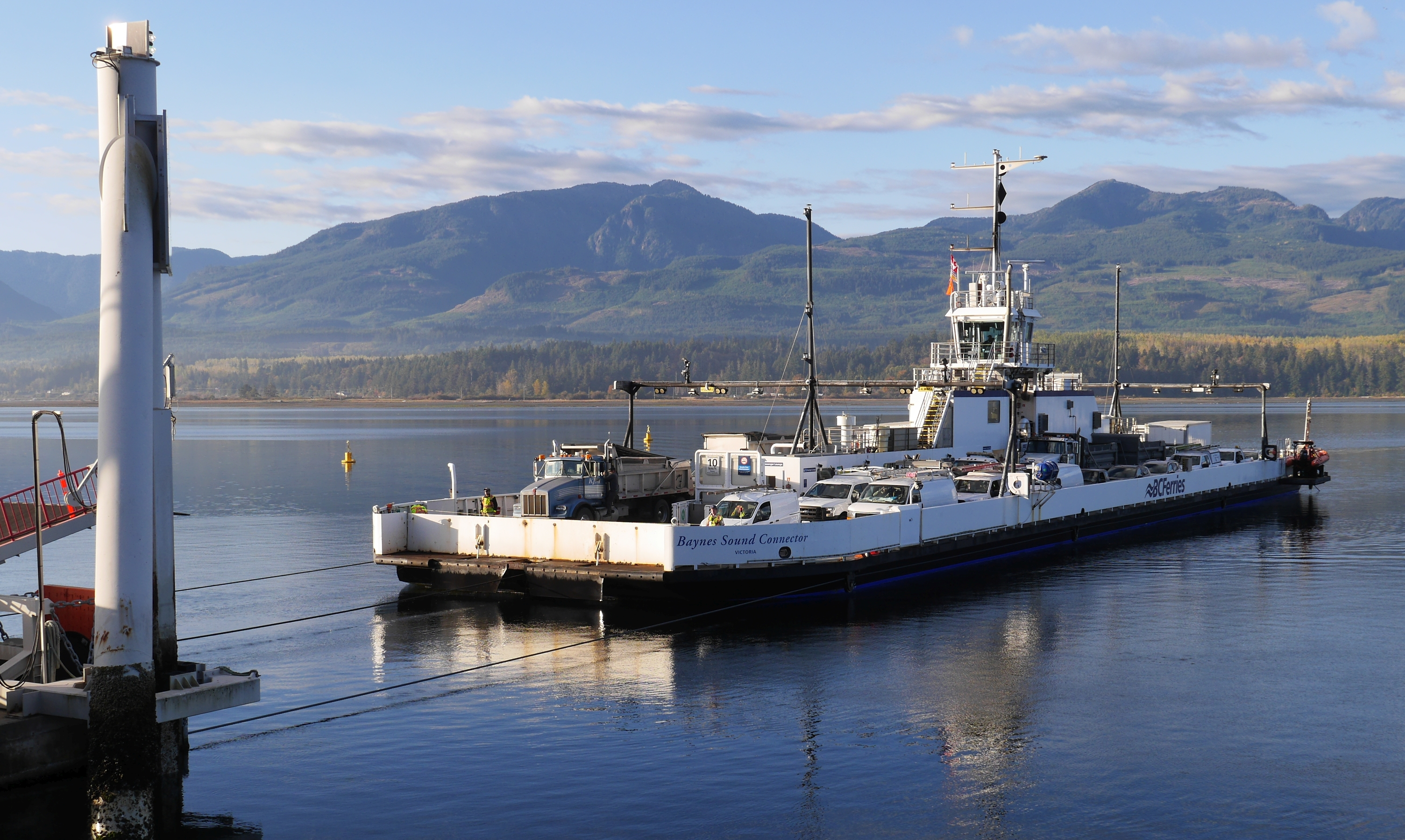
- Baynes Sound Connector en route to the Denman Island West Ferry Terminal

Canada
- Name: Baynes Sound Connector
- Owner: British Columbia Ferry Services Inc.
- Operator: BC Ferries
- Route: Buckley Bay ↔ Denman Island
- Launched: 2015
- Christened: 2015
- In service: February 2016
- Identification: IMO number: 9739252; MMSI number: 316030644; Callsign: CFN7319
- Status: In service

General characteristics
- Class & type: Cable ferry, unclassed
- Displacement: 750 t (740 long tons)
- Length: 78.5 m (257 ft 7 in)
- Installed power: 998 hp (744 kW)
- Speed: 8.5 knots (15.7 km/h; 9.8 mph)
- Capacity: 200 passengers and crew; 45 cars

Baynes Sound Connector is a car ferry owned and operated by BC Ferries that runs between Buckley Bay on Vancouver Island and Denman Island. It is the first and only cable ferry in the BC Ferries fleet and replaced the self-propelled Quinitsa in February 2016. Red and green transit lights are installed at both Buckley Bay and Denman West terminals facing oncoming marine traffic in each direction. It is illegal to cross the channel while the red light is on, signifying the ferry is in transit. The crossing with a length of 1,961.48 metres (6,435.3 ft) is the longest cable ferry crossing in the world. It uses two guide cables and a third driving cable.

== Design and description ==
Baynes Sound Connector is a 78.5-metre (257 ft 7 in)-long car ferry designed for 150 passengers and 45 vehicles. The vessel has a maximum displacement of 750 metric tons (740 long tons) and an engine capable of creating 744 kilowatts (998 hp). Baynes Sound Connector has a maximum speed of 8.5 knots (15.7 km/h; 9.8 mph) and a passenger and crew capacity of 200 people max. It services the route between Buckley Bay on Vancouver Island and Denman Island. Red and green transit lights are installed at both Buckley Bay and Denman West terminals facing oncoming marine traffic in each direction. It is illegal to cross the channel while the red light is on, signifying the ferry is in transit. The ferry uses two guide cables and a third driving cable to cross the water between the two terminals. In the case of a cable break, the ferry is designed to be towed by a tugboat to the closest terminal.

== Construction and career ==
In 2013, BC Ferries, Dynamic Systems Analysis and E.Y.E. Marine Consultants presented a paper at the SNAME Annual Meeting showing design elements and numerical simulations of the proposed ferry, in particular the hydraulically driven bull wheels operating on a single traction cable and two guide cables - 1.625-inch cables to be pre-tensioned with 200 kilonewtons - and pontoon docking.

The ferry was built by Seaspan at its Vancouver Shipyards at a cost of CAD$15 million. Its construction suffered delays and trial mishaps and the project has been drawing heavy criticism for using more fuel than the previous ship and for a lower service reliability notably caused by the downtime during excessive wind speed. BC Ferries denied the allegations. The ship was launched in 2015. Baynes Sound Connector replaced the self-propelled Quinitsa on the Buckley Bay–Denman Island route in February 2016. Upon entering service, the crossing with a length of 1,961.48 metres (6,435.3 ft), became the longest cable ferry crossing in the world.

In 2019, the Baynes Sound Connector in the three years since launch surpassed 30,000 sailings and saved more than 415,000 litres (91,000 imp gal; 110,000 US gal) of fuel on route. In the same year it was criticized for shedding plastic from the cables. In 2020, the original plastic-covered cables were replaced with regular steel cables. In 2021, the vessel underwent a refit that upgraded the bull wheel drive system that governs the cables.

A BC Ferries review of February 16, 2023 identified persisting problems with "overheating of the hydraulic motors, bolt cracking on the bull-wheel and hull fouling". "The broad community continues to be unsupportive of the vessel and reactions to potential increased investment remain highly negative." The review recommended to meet increasing demand with an additional smaller conventional ferry at peak times and to repower and expand Baynes Sound Connector by 2034.
