= The Footprints of God =

2003 American novel by Greg Iles

- First edition cover
- Author: Greg Iles
- Genre: Thriller
- Publisher: Scribner
- Publication date: August 1, 2003
- ISBN: 0-7432-3469-3

The Footprints of God is a thriller novel written by American author Greg Iles. It was published in hardcover in 2003 by Scribner, then in March 2004 by Pocket Books, a division of Simon & Schuster, Inc. The book was sold as Dark Matter in Australia. It made The New York Times Best Seller list.

== Plot summary ==
The story revolves around a supercomputer being built in a secret government lab working on a project called Trinity. When one of the project's scientists dies, David Tennant, the ethical caretaker, discovers that he had been killed for his refusal to accept the project's ultimate aim; a merger of the human mind and the machine, in order to produce an unrivalled super computing machine. Tennant subsequently tries to piece together the truth behind the project while he and his psychiatrist Dr. Rachel Weiss are pursued around the globe.

Tennant suffers from a series of regression episodes, which are considered to be seizures by his doctor, who says they are caused by overexposure to a super-MRI scan. During these episodes, he has strangely vivid dreams, in which he witnesses the beginning of the universe (the Big Bang) and the history of humankind. Subsequent dreams seem to be memories of Jesus of Nazareth, something that Tennant, an atheist, finds strange and bewildering. They take a bizarre turn when he sees himself as an NSA assassin sent to kill him, and also as his dead friend, Andrew Fielding, in his last moments.

In the end, it seems that someone was in fact showing him these dreams, to tell him something.
