= Sandy Island Marine Provincial Park =

Provincial park in British Columbia, Canada

- IUCN category II (national park)
- Location within British Columbia
- Interactive map of Sandy Island Marine Provincial Park
- Location: British Columbia, Canada
- Nearest city: Courtenay
- Coordinates: 49°37′08″N 124°51′05″W
- Area: 0.3 km^{2} (0.12 sq mi)
- Established: June 7, 1966
- Governing body: BC Parks

Sandy Island Marine Provincial Park, formerly Sandy Island Provincial Park and also known as Tree Island Park, is a 30 hectare provincial park in British Columbia, Canada, located off the north end of Denman Island, on the west side of the Strait of Georgia to the south of Comox. The park comprises Sandy Island (locally known as Tree Island) and the Seal Islets. It is accessible by boat and, at low tide, by foot across tidal flats from Longbeak Point on Denman Island.

In 2012 the park's name was officially changed to Jáji7em and Kw'uhl Marine Park (a.k.a. Sandy Island Marine Park), reflecting the K'omoks names for the islands. Jáji7em ("having trees") refers to Sandy Island, while Kw'uhl (unknown meaning) refers to either the Seal Islets or just Seal Island (a.k.a. Shack Island), the largest of the islets.
