= The Quiet Game =

1999 novel by Greg Iles

- First edition cover
- Author: Greg Iles
- Audio read by: Dick Hill
- Publisher: Dutton Press
- Publication date: September 1, 1999
- ISBN: 0-525-93793-5

The Quiet Game is a 1999 novel by American writer Greg Iles, first published by Dutton in the United States. The audiobook narrated by Dick Hill was published in September 2001.

== Plot summary ==
The novel is of investigative crime fiction genre, entailing the main character of Penn Cage. Cage travels back to his home town of Natchez, Mississippi with his young daughter after the death of his wife. A successful novelist with a legal background, Penn finds that his father is being blackmailed over a long-forgotten murder by a criminal he never turned in to the police. While home, Penn is approached by the widow and daughter of a black Korean War veteran long-believed to have been murdered by the Ku Klux Klan. Cage soon realizes that these two cases are inextricably linked, and have much more profound implications than he imagined. Joining forces with Caitlin Masters, a young newspaper publisher from the north, Penn confronts angry Klansmen, the secretive director of the FBI, a guilt-ridden black policeman, and his old high school love in his quest to penetrate the layers of mystery that hide the truth about a small Southern city.

== Characters ==
The characters of Penn Cage, Dr. Tom Cage, and their family members appear as both central and peripheral characters in later Iles novels set in the town of Natchez. Examples are Turning Angel, The Devil's Punchbowl, Blood Memory, and Sleep No More. A trilogy of Penn Cage novels was published at the end of April 2014. The first volume is titled Natchez Burning.

== See also ==
- Penn Cage
