= 24 Hours (novel) =

2000 novel by Greg Iles

- Cover of the first edition
- Author: Greg Iles
- Published: New York, Putnam, 2000
- Pages: 335
- ISBN: 9780399146244
- OCLC: 43569179

24 Hours is a bestselling novel written by American author Greg Iles. It was published in 2000 by Putnam (New York). The 2002 film Trapped is based on this book.

== Plot summary ==
Joe Hickey is a serial criminal working to extort money from wealthy doctors by kidnapping their children under a 24-hour ransom deadline designed to minimize police involvement. In what he decides will be his final kidnapping, he abducts Abby Jennings, child of Dr. Will Jennings, whom Joe Hickey blames for his mother's death. Abby has diabetes and her parents begin to panic that she will die if they cannot rescue her in time.

== Screenplay ==
In 2002, Iles wrote the screenplay 24 Hours from his novel of the same name. This script was subsequently rewritten by director Don Roos and renamed Trapped (2002 film) to avoid confusion with the then-current television series, 24. At the request of the producers and actors, Iles then rewrote the script during the shoot.
