= Sleep No More (novel) =

2002 novel by Greg Iles

- Author: Greg Iles
- Publisher: G. P. Putnam's Sons
- Publication date: July 8, 2002
- ISBN: 0-399-14881-7

Sleep No More ("La regola del buio") is a 2002 novel by American author Greg Iles. In the novel, protagonist John Waters finds the lives of his wife and child in jeopardy when the soul of a lover he had 20 years ago appears in the body of a female stranger in Natchez, Mississippi. Part mystery, part thriller, part romance, the book probes the concepts of pathological jealousy and transmigration of the soul.

== Publication details ==
- Iles, Greg (2002). Sleep No More (1st ed.). ISBN 0-399-14881-7.
