= Greg Iles =

American novelist (1960–2025)

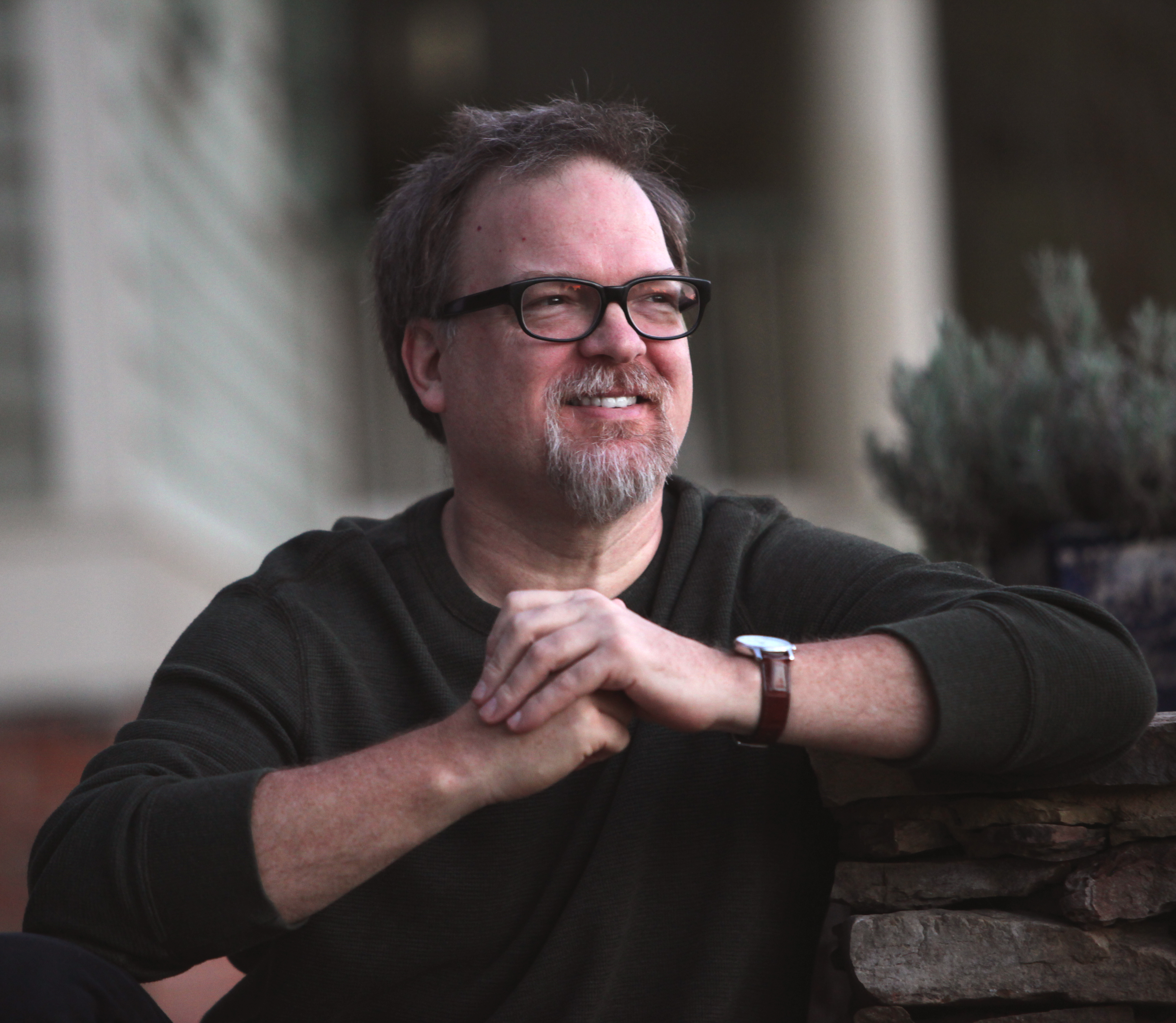
- Greg Iles in 2013
- Born: Mark Gregory Iles; April 8, 1960; Stuttgart, Baden-Württemberg, West Germany
- Died: August 15, 2025 (aged 65); Natchez, Mississippi, U.S.
- Education: University of Mississippi
- Occupation: Novelist
- Spouses: Carrie McGee (divorced); Caroline Hungerford (m. 2014)
- Children: 4
- Writing career
- Period: 1993–2024

Mark Gregory Iles (April 8, 1960 – August 15, 2025) was an American novelist who lived in Mississippi. He published eighteen novels and one novella, spanning a variety of genres.

== Early life ==
Mark Gregory Iles was born on April 8, 1960, in Stuttgart, Baden-Württemberg, West Germany, where his physician father ran the U.S. Embassy Medical Clinic. After attending Trinity Episcopal Day School, he was graduated from the University of Mississippi in 1983.

== Career ==
Iles spent several years as a guitarist, singer, and songwriter in the band Frankly Scarlet. He quit the band after he was married and began working on his first novel, Spandau Phoenix, a thriller about Nazi war criminal Rudolf Hess. Spandau Phoenix was published in 1992.

In 2002, Iles wrote the screenplay 24 Hours from his novel of the same name. Rewritten by director Don Roos, it was renamed Trapped. Iles then rewrote the script during the shoot, at the request of the producers and actors.

In 2011, Iles was seriously injured in a traffic accident on U.S. Route 61 near Natchez. He sustained life-threatening injuries, including a ruptured aorta. He was put into an induced coma for eight days, and lost his right leg below the knee. During his three-year recovery, he wrote three volumes of a trilogy set in Natchez, Mississippi, and featuring former prosecutor Penn Cage.

Iles was a member of the literary musical group The Rock Bottom Remainders, which includes or has included authors Dave Barry, Ridley Pearson, Stephen King, Scott Turow, Amy Tan, Mitch Albom, Roy Blount, Jr., Matt Groening, and James McBride. In July 2013, as part of the group, he co-authored Hard Listening (2013), an ebook combining a variety of genres and media to give readers a view into the private lives of the authors/musicians.

== Personal life and death ==
Iles was first married to Carrie McGee; the couple had two children before divorcing. In 2014, he married Caroline Hungerford, with whom he also had two children.

Iles was diagnosed with multiple myeloma, a form of blood cancer, in 1996. By the early 2020s, the cancer had progressed substantially, leaving him requiring a wheelchair; he underwent a stem cell transplant before the publication of his final novel, Southern Man (2024). He died from the disease at his Natchez home on August 15, 2025, at the age of 65.

== Works ==
=== Penn Cage Series ===
- The Quiet Game (1999) ISBN 0-525-93793-5
- Turning Angel (2005) ISBN 0-7432-3471-5
- The Devil's Punchbowl (2009) ISBN 978-0-7432-9251-1
- The Death Factory (2014) novella ISBN 978-0-0623-3669-9
- Natchez Burning (2014) ISBN 978-0-0623-1108-5
- The Bone Tree (2015) ISBN 978-0-0623-1112-2
- Mississippi Blood (2017) ISBN 978-0-0623-1116-0
- Southern Man (2024) ISBN 978-0-0628-2469-1

=== Fiction ===
- Spandau Phoenix (1993) ISBN 0-525-93604-1
- Black Cross (1995) ISBN 0-525-93829-X
- Mortal Fear (1997) ISBN 0-525-93792-7
- 24 Hours (2000) ISBN 0-399-14624-5
- Dead Sleep (2001) ISBN 0-399-14735-7
- Sleep No More (2002) ISBN 0-399-14881-7
- The Footprints of God (2003) (also titled Dark Matter) ISBN 0-340-82274-0
- Blood Memory (2005) ISBN 0-7432-3470-7
- True Evil (2006) ISBN 0-7432-9249-9
- Third Degree (2007) ISBN 978-1-4165-2454-0
- Cemetery Road (2019) ISBN 978-0-0628-2468-4

=== Nonfiction ===
- Hard Listening (2013), with Rock Bottom Remainders
