= Vesuvius, British Columbia =

Vesuvius
- Location of Vesuvius in British Columbia
- Coordinates: 48°53′00″N 123°34′00″W
- Country: Canada
- Province: British Columbia
- Area codes: 250, 778

Vesuvius, also known as Vesuvius Bay, is an unincorporated settlement and ferry terminal on the northwest coast of Saltspring Island in the Gulf Islands of British Columbia, Canada. It is the eastern terminus of a ferry which connects Saltspring Island to Vancouver Island across Sansum Narrows to Crofton, which is just north of the city of Duncan.

Throughout the 1800s, Vesuvius was predominantly composed of African-American settlers and their descendants. Racial tensions arose between August 1867 and December 1868, when three Black men were murdered in the community of Vesuvius Bay. The murderers were largely blamed on the local coastal Indigenous community. This resulted in racial tensions in the area, which led to a dwindling number of Black residents on Salt Spring Island. Much of the youth moved away to Victoria, Vancouver, and on occasion to the United States.

It is named for HMS Vesuvius (1839), a ship of the Royal Navy assigned to the Pacific Station at Esquimalt in the 19th century, and indirectly after Mount Vesuvius in Italy.
