= Buckley Bay =

- Location of Buckley Bay in British Columbia Buckley Bay (British Columbia)
- Coordinates: 49°31′30″N 124°50′55″W
- Country: Canada
- Province: British Columbia
- Time zone: UTC−07:00 (PT)
- Area codes: 250, 778

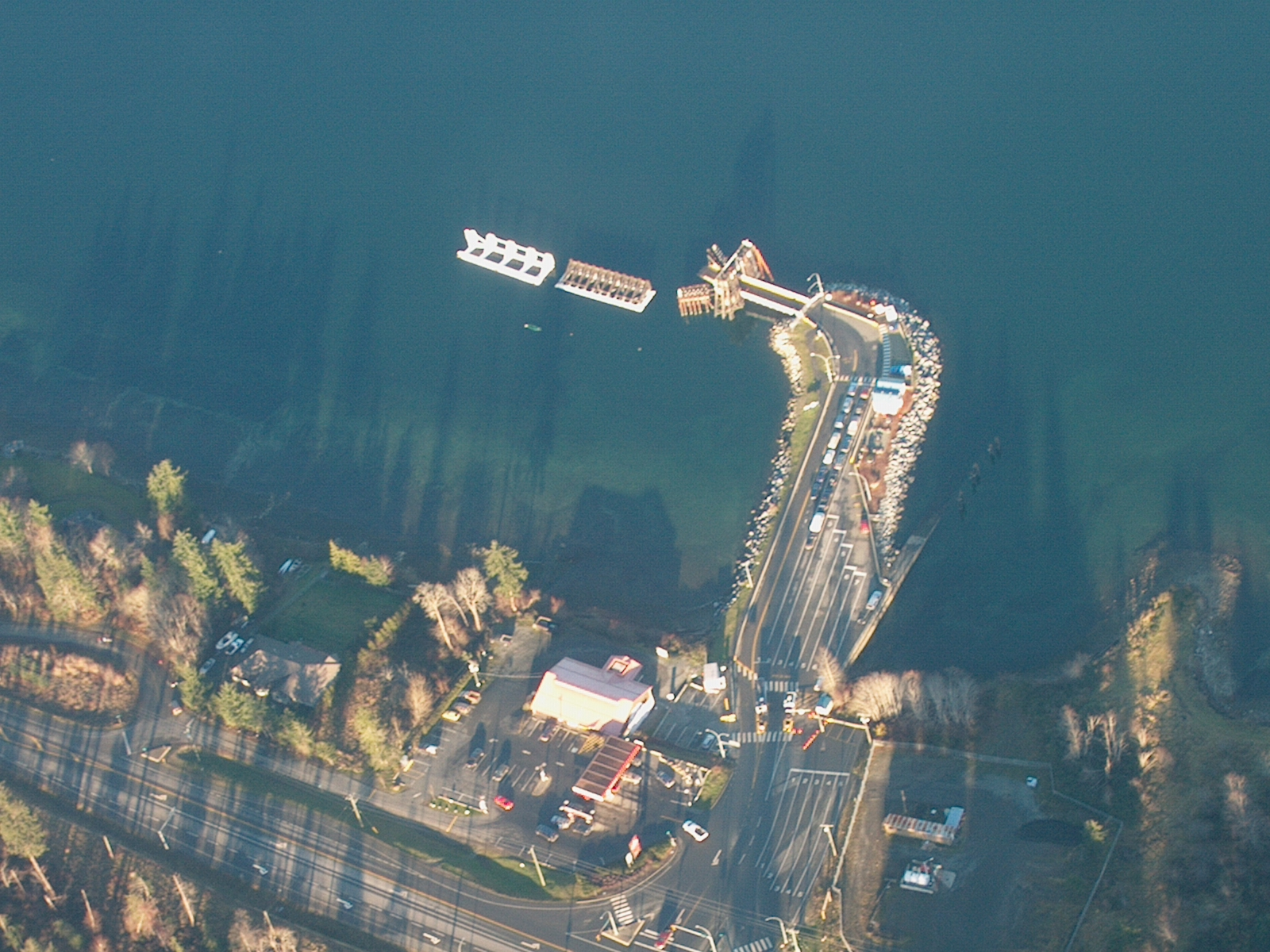
Aerial view of Denman Island Ferry terminal at Buckley Bay

Buckley Bay is a geographical location on the east coast of Vancouver Island, located between Union Bay to the north and Fanny Bay to the south. It is the departure point for the BC Ferries crossing of Baynes Sound to Denman Island and on to Hornby Island. Buckley Bay is accessible from both the Old Island Highway (19A) and from Exit 101 on the newer Inland Island Highway (19). The Island Rail Corridor also passes through Buckley Bay at Mile 126.2 of the Victoria Subdivision. The area has a population of 173, according to the 2006 Census.
