= Fanny Bay =

- Settlement
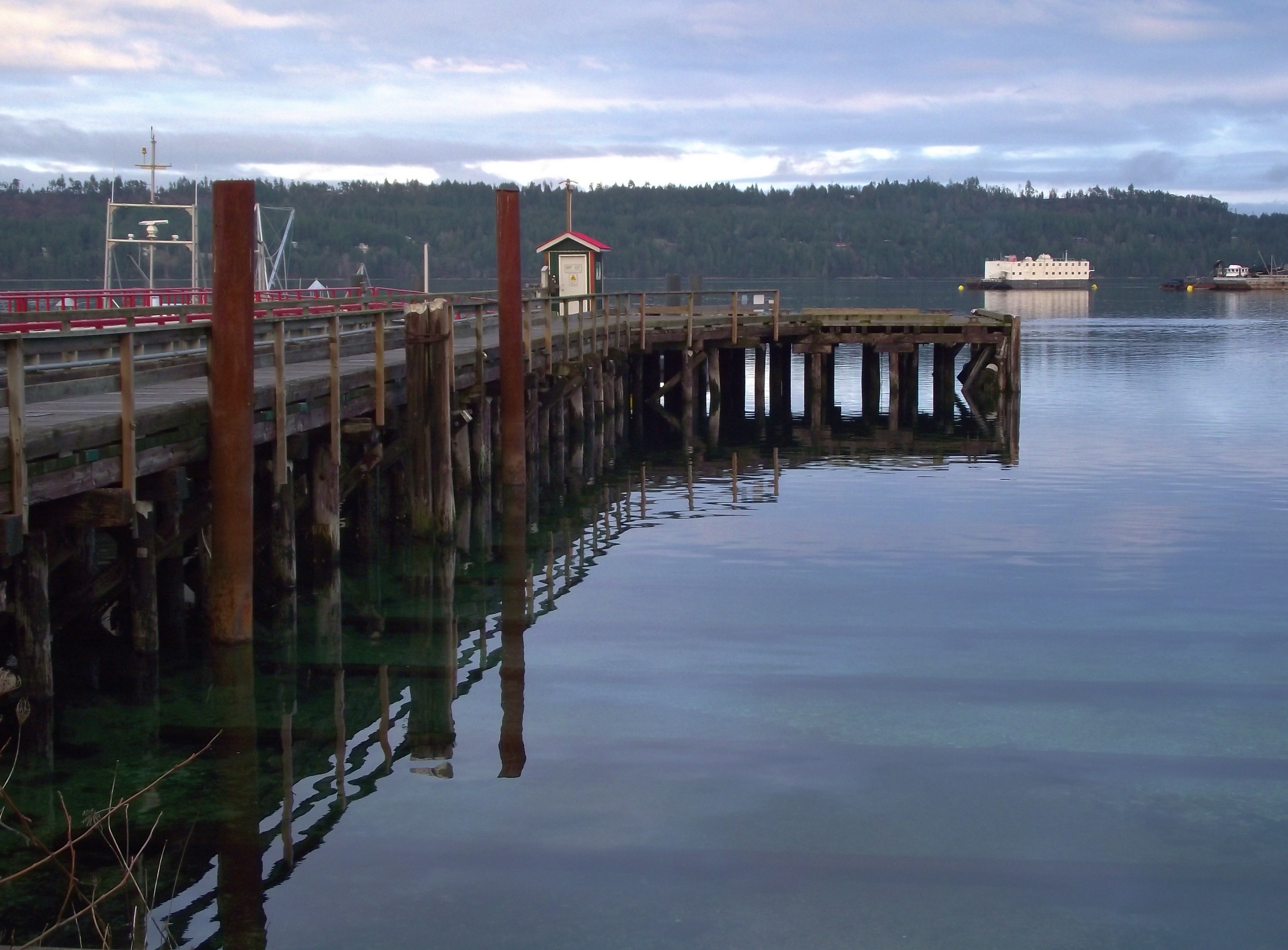

- Location of Fanny Bay in British Columbia Fanny Bay (British Columbia)
- Coordinates: 49°29′24″N 124°48′43″W
- Country: Canada
- Province: British Columbia
- Region: Vancouver Island
- Regional district: Comox Valley

Area
  - Total: 7.40 km^{2} (2.86 sq mi)
- Elevation: 0 m (0 ft)

Population (2021)
  - Total: 921
  - Density: 124.5/km^{2} (322/sq mi)
- Time zone: UTC−07:00 (PT)
- Postal code span: V0R 1W0
- Area codes: 250, 778
- Highways: 19A
- Waterways: Baynes Sound
- Website: fannybaycommunity.com

Fanny Bay is an unincorporated community in the Canadian province of British Columbia. It is located on Baynes Sound on the east coast of Vancouver Island. It has a population of 921. It is best known for its fine oysters. The area is served by the Island Highway.

== Origin of the name ==
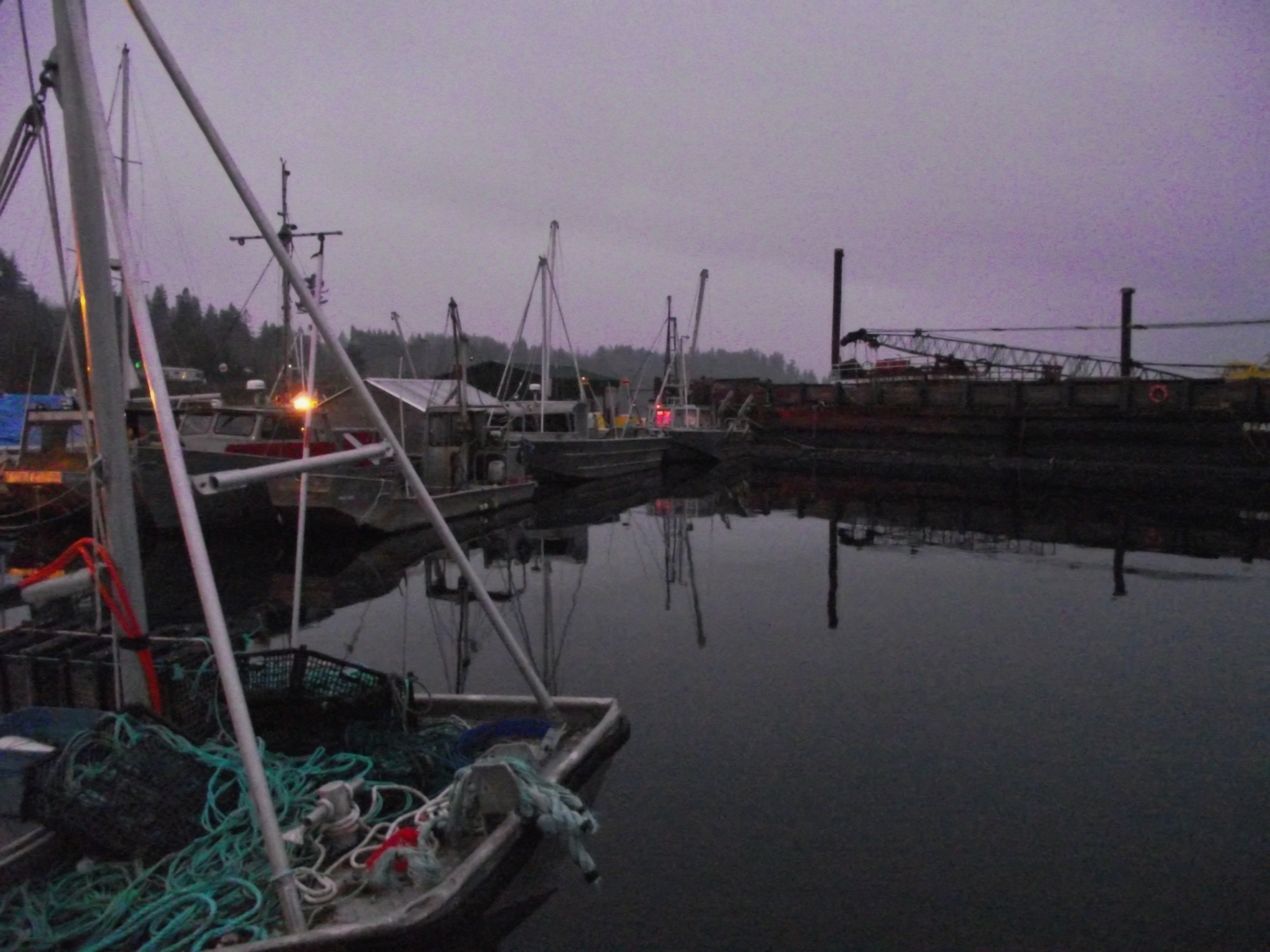
View of Fanny Bay, BC service docks and oyster boats

There is no consensus on the origin of the name Fanny Bay and none of the various explanations — comical, romantic, local or historical — can be considered without skepticism. The name first appeared on British Columbia maps in 1913 and was officially adopted by the government in 1923. This adoption was based on British Admiralty charts of the 1860s, taken from surveys by Royal Navy Captain G.H. Richards. However, if Capt. Richards knew who "Fanny" was, he did not record the information. Geographer A.B. McNeill wrote in his book Origin of Station Names, Esquimalt and Nanaimo Division that "...Fanny Bay was named after a sea captain who lived in this vicinity"; however, no dates or any other supporting information are provided. A popular and persistent local theory holds that Fanny Bay was named by Captain George Vancouver in 1792. However, Capt. Vancouver's nautical charts and journals only describe the east side of the nearest body of water, the Strait of Georgia (including Texada Island). There was only a rough outline of the eastern shore of Vancouver Island between Nanaimo and Comox, and his charts omitted several nearby islands and other features.

Fanny Bay may have been named after Francis "Fanny" Palmer, the daughter of a popular Victoria family who ran a music and dance studio. Fanny perished in the sinking of the Pacific off Cape Flattery on November 4, 1875, at the age of 18. The Palmer family had a number of daughters who were accomplished singers, and their home was at the centre of the social circle in early Victoria.

Fanny Bay has a fire hall, community school, government wharf. A community located in Fanny Bay called Ships Point also has its own fire department.

== History ==
=== 20th century ===
Eikichi Kagetsu incorporated the Deep Bay Logging Company, which owned and operated timberlands in Deep Bay as well as at least 3,000 acres in Fanny Bay. There was a settlement that housed the labourers, with split-cedar houses, a water system, and a school. The labourers in this logging company were predominantly Japanese-Canadian, although at the time it was against the law for Japanese people to operate steam machines, so Caucasian workers were hired to operate those.

During the internment of Japanese Canadians in World War II, the Canadian government confiscated all of Kagetsu's property and businesses, eventually selling the logging company to the H.R. MacMillan Export Company at a loss.

=== 21st century ===
Until 2005, a restaurant operating out of a pulled-ashore barge, named Brico, was located in Fanny Bay.

== Shellfish ==
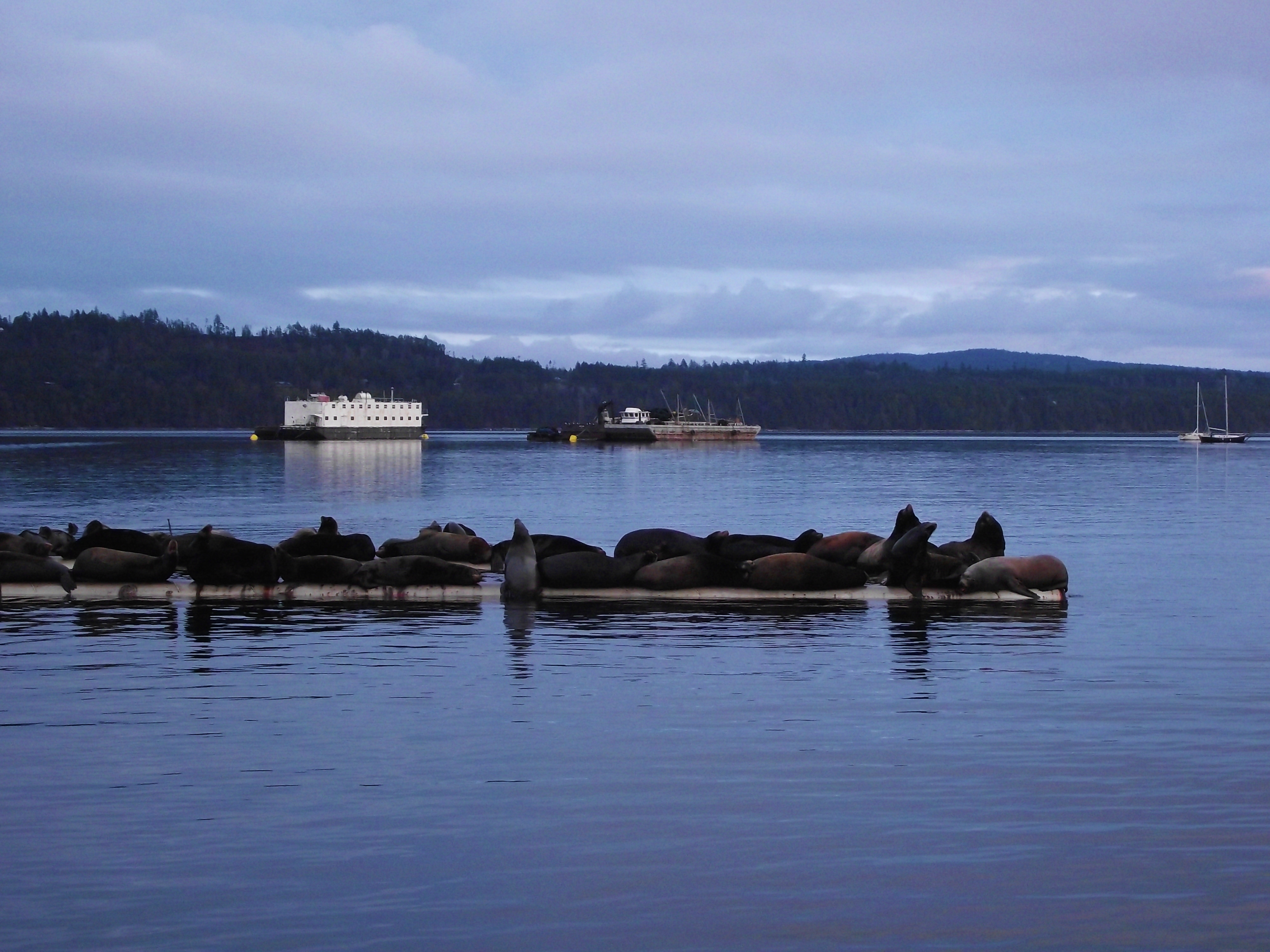
Fanny Bay with oyster processor and sea lions

Fanny Bay is well known as a source of farmed shellfish, specifically Pacific oysters (scientific name Crassostrea gigas), manila clams (Venerupis philippinarum), savoury clams (Nuttallia obscurata) and mussels (Mytilus galloprovincialis), for both domestic and global markets.

Oysters were introduced to the area as early as 1912 or 1913, with further seedings around 1925. As a result of the lack of Pacific oysters from Japan during World War II, further seeding occurred in 1942 (along with seedings in other parts of the Strait of Georgia).

Eikichi Kagetsu introduced 9 crates of oyster seed from Japan around 1926-1927. In the 1930s they received permission from the E&N Railway to use 10 acres along the shore to develop oyster culture.

Oyster and clam seeding in Baynes Sound at Fanny Bay occurred around 1947, by Joseph McLellan, a pioneer in oyster aquaculture. McLellan imported his first batch of oyster seed from Japan and seeded the beach areas around Fanny Bay - Mud Bay, Ship Point, Buckley Bay and Denman Island. McLellan's descendants still own and operate the oyster and clam farm located in Fanny Bay, Mac's Oysters Ltd.

Manila clam seed was inadvertently included in Joseph McLellan's initial seed shipments from Japan.

== Arts and culture ==
=== Wacky Woods ===
Fanny Bay was home to an outdoor art exhibit known as Wacky Woods. It was built in the 1970s by artist George Sawchuk. Many of the artworks in the woods had a political and surrealist nature, with works touching on topics from old-growth logging to the War in Afghanistan. Visitors could tour the outdoor art installation freely. Sawchuk died in 2012. Wacky Woods closed in 2018, as the property was sold.

=== Fanny Bay Inn ===
The Fanny Bay Inn is a recognizable landmark and popular pub located on the Island Highway in Fanny Bay. It was built in 1938, and for decades has operated as a pub and local gathering spot, hosting music performances and jam sessions. It celebrated its 80th anniversary in 2018.
