= Denman Island =

Island of the Northern Gulf Islands in British Columbia, Canada

Denman Island (lháytayich)
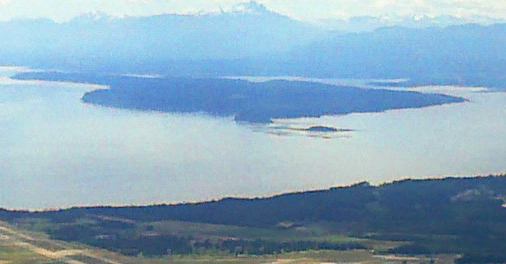
- Denman Island looking south from Comox

- Location in British Columbia Location in Comox Valley Regional District

Geography
- Location: Strait of Georgia
- Coordinates: 49°33′N 124°48′W
- Archipelago: Gulf Islands
- Area: 51.03 km^{2} (19.70 sq mi)

Administration
- Canada
- Province: British Columbia
- Regional district: Comox Valley
- Islands Trust: Local Trust Cttee.

Demographics
- Population: 1,391 (2021)

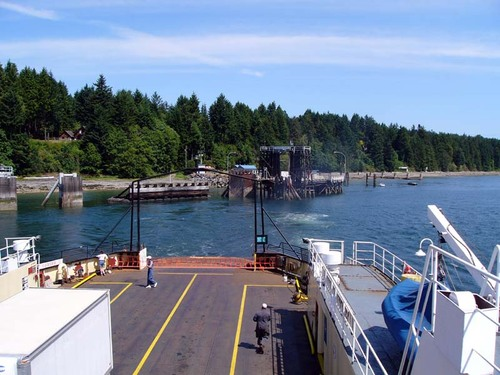
Leaving Denman Island on the Ferry Quinitsa which was replaced by the Baynes Sound Connector in 2016

Denman Island, (also known as lháytayich in the Comox language, meaning "Inner Island"), is one of the Northern Gulf Islands and part of the Comox Valley Regional District of British Columbia, Canada. It is a member of the Islands Trust group of islands and is home to a small community of 1,391 year-round residents.

== History ==
Denman Island was first inhabited by Indigenous peoples including the Pentlatch and Tla'amin First Nations as evidenced by middens, gravesites, and oral history. The site most recently occupied by Pentlatch people named the island Punchlatt. In 1862 smallpox epidemic severely reduced its population and the survivors moved to join the K'ómoks people in nearby Comox.

The Island was seen and mapped by Europeans during the 1791 voyage of the Spanish ship Santa Saturnina, under Juan Carrasco and José María Narváez. It was named by Captain Richards in 1860 for Rear Admiral Joseph Denman who was commander of the Pacific station from 1864 to 1866.

The earliest colonial settlers of Denman Island arrived during the 1870s. Some were attracted by the establishment of the Baynes Sound Coal Mine on the Tsable River, across Baynes Sound from Denman Island. Mine construction started in 1873 and coal was shipped in 1876. Several large families migrated to Denman Island from Eastern Canada in 1876 including the McFarlane, Piercy and Graham families. After being briefly in production the Baynes Sound mine closed in 1877 and mine surveyor David Pickles moved to Denman Island, preempting a large wetland in the middle of the island.

== Denman Island life ==
Regular ferry service links Denman Island to both Hornby Island from Gravelly Bay on the east side of Denman and across Baynes Sound via the Baynes Sound Connector cable ferry to Buckley Bay on Vancouver Island on the west side. The village of Denman consists of one general store and post office, two community halls, downtown tennis/pickleball court, a covered outdoor space conceived during the time of Covid and a museum, the community school that has grades from kindergarten to grade seven, the Dora Drinkwater Volunteer Library, a community school, an Anglican church, a United church, and the Arts Centre. There is also a hardware store, craft store and Abraxas Book Gifts, a book and gift store and coffee shop. Around the corner on Piercy Road is the Denman Island Health Centre.

A number of potters, weavers, painters and writers have made Denman Island their home for decades.

The author Emily St. John Mandel spent most of her childhood on Denman Island, and modeled much of the fictional Delano Island in her novel Station Eleven after it.

== Vegetation and soils ==
The western part of Denman Island is covered by a dense forest dominated by Douglas fir, western hemlock, and western red cedar on deep loamy glacial till or marine deposits mapped as Royston gravelly loam or Tolmie-Merville complex. Some areas have shallow soils over sedimentary rock and are mapped as Haslam shaly loam or Rough Stony-Haslam complex. The eastern part has a loamy sand (Kye-Qualicum complex or Bowser series) on which arbutus is frequently present near the shore. Poorly drained depressions are mapped as Tolmie loam, Parksville sandy loam, or Arrowsmith peat.

== Denman Island Disease ==
An infectious disease among Pacific oysters was identified in 1960 off Denman Island. The disease causes visible yellow/green pustules on the body and adductor muscles of the oysters therefore reducing marketability of the oysters. It was found that the causative agent of these lesions are associated with microcells, which were later identified as Mikrocytos mackini.

== Provincial Parks located on Denman Island ==
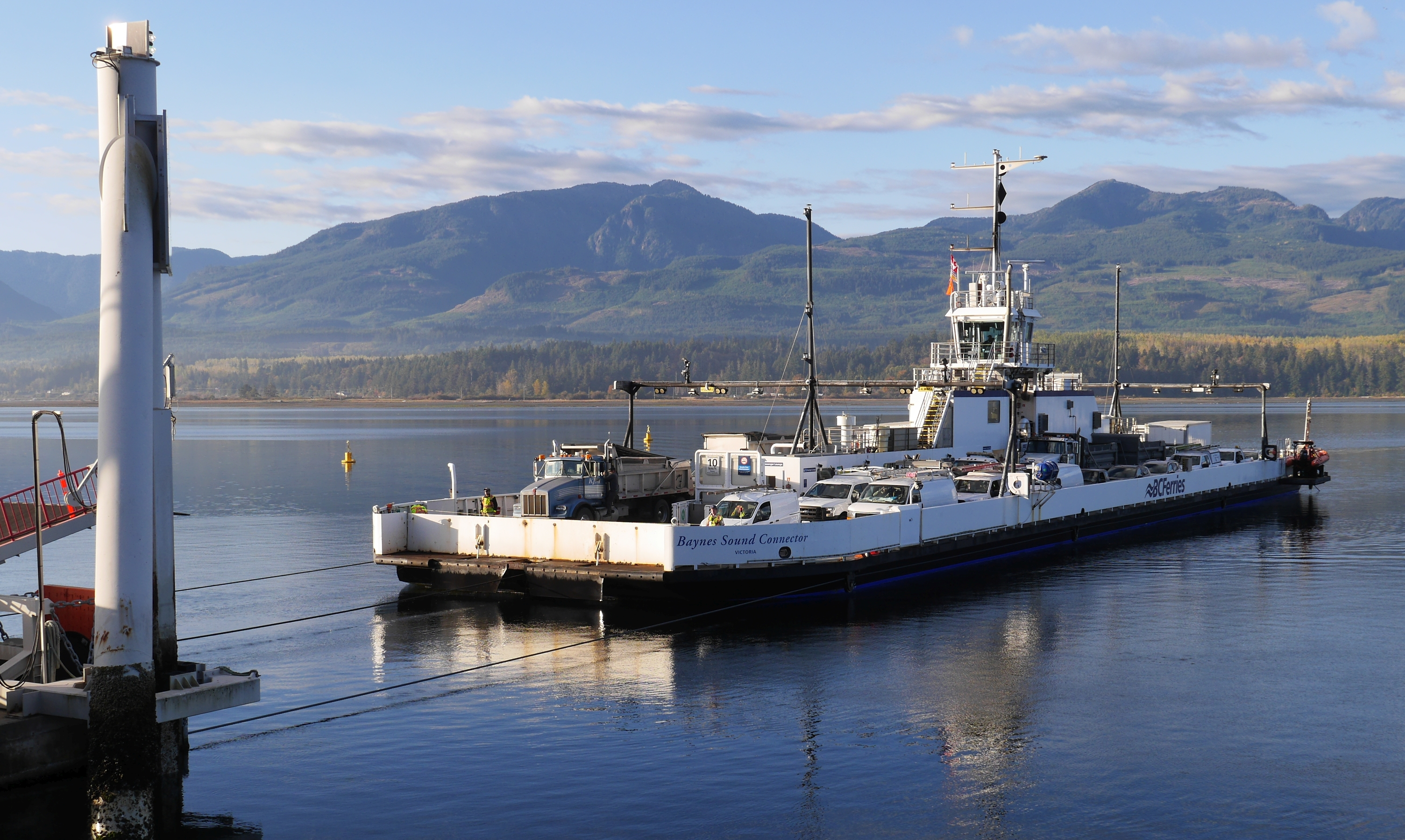
Baynes Sound Connector arriving at Denman West Ferry Terminal

- Sandy Island Marine Provincial Park (off northern tip, accessible on foot at low tide).
- Fillongley Provincial Park – B.C. Ministry of Environment Site
- Boyle Point Provincial Park – B.C. Ministry of Environment Site
- Denman Island Park and Protected Area – B.C. Ministry of Environment Site

== Local media ==
Denman Island has a monthly news and artistic journal called the Flagstone, a weekly news and advertising circular called the Grapevine, a relatively new bi-weekly journal, The Barnacle, and several active online groups on social media.
