= Cedar, British Columbia =

Human settlement in British Columbia, Canada

Cedar
- Location of Saturna in British Columbia
- Country: Canada
- Province: British Columbia

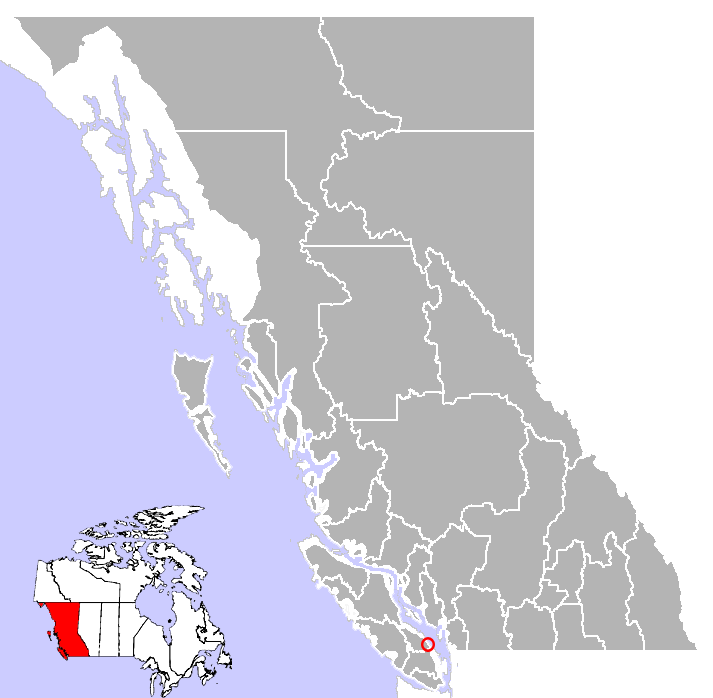
Location of Cedar, BC

Cedar is a small community in the Canadian province of British Columbia.

It is located near the east coast of Vancouver Island — about 8 kilometres (5.0 mi) south-east of Nanaimo — along the banks of the Nanaimo River. Its geographical coordinates are 49°07′N 123°51′W.

The village was so named because of the profusion of Thuja plicata trees in its vicinity, known as the Western Red Cedar.

To the north of Cedar, three Snuneymuxw First Nation Indian reserves, Nanaimo River 2, 3, and 4, border the community.

Nearby parks include Nanaimo River Regional Park, Morden Colliery Historic Provincial Park, and Hemer Provincial Park.

== History ==
In 1850 a settler named James Stove settled in the area to develop a local coal mine, being the first permanent European inhabitant of the area. Migration continued and the locally notable Fiddick family, moved to the Cedar area in 1872. Cedar on April 1 1888 opened a post office.

== See also ==
- List of communities in British Columbia
- Cable Bay Trail
