= Viola Wyse =

Canadian civil servant

- Viola Wyse in 2007
- Born: Viola Drake; August 29, 1947; Campbell River, British Columbia, Canada
- Died: August 17, 2009 (aged 61); Nanaimo, British Columbia, Canada
- Occupations: Tribal chief Accountant

Viola Wyse (née Drake; August 29, 1947 – August 17, 2009) was a Canadian Coast Salish tribal leader and civil servant. Wyse was the first woman to be elected chief of Snuneymuxw First Nation, Nanaimo, BC, a post she assumed in 2006 and held until her death. During her tenure as chief, Wyse secured protocol agreements with government bodies such as the City of Nanaimo, Island Trust and Nanaimo Port Authority for infrastructural protections and development, cultural protections, service to the tribe, and economic growth.

== Early life and education ==
Wyse was trained as an accountant at Nanaimo Vocational School.

== Career ==
After graduation from school, Wyse spent two decades working with the Department of Indian Affairs. From 1995 to 2001 she worked as a Snuneymuxw band administrator. In 2002 she was elected councillor of Snuneymuxw First Nation, Nanaimo, BC. In 2006, her fellow councillors and family encouraged her to run for chief against incumbent chief John Wesley. She became the first woman to be chief after earning 169 votes of 436; Wesley earned 134. During her three years of chiefdom, the Snuneymuxw built 39 hew homes — before this, Snunymuxw had gone 16 years without any new construction. Wyse administered deals to bring more water and sewer infrastructure on the three Snuneymuxw reserves in Cedar. Wyse further secured protections for a cemetery (burial site) of more than 80 people. The burial grounds were uncovered during excavations for a condominium complex in 2007 at Departure Bay. B.C. Governmental Premier Gorden Campbell followed Wyse's petition to protect the site, which led to its purchase soon after for an undisclosed amount.

=== Leadership ===
Indigenous self-governance had increased visibility through Wyse's inclusive collaboration with Canadian governmental bodies. According to Snuneymuxw councillor Bill Yoachim, Wyse demonstrated leadership that built bridges between the tribe and local governments, giving the Snuneymuxw a voice about activity taking place on tribal land. For instance, she went out to give public talks about substance abuse in schools, highlighting Snuneymux Healing and Justice community programs as an example of tribal governance in the aftermath of Canadian Indian residential schools, earning mention in a book collection about educational programming. She was also interviewed by Robina Anne Thomas (Qwul’sih’yah’maht), a doctoral candidate who completed a book length manuscript about indigenous women in leadership. Thomas wrote that Chief Viola Wyse was a "household name," well known and respected for her inclusive leadership style: "When discussing relationship building, [Wyse] said, " 'They're not going away and neither are we.'"
