= Fourth Lake (Vancouver Island) =

Canadian lake

- Location within Vancouver Island
- Location: Vancouver Island, British Columbia
- Coordinates: 49°04′00″N 124°25′00″W
- Lake type: Natural lake
- Basin countries: Canada

Fourth Lake is a lake located on Vancouver Island at the expansion of Sadie Creek south of the Nanaimo River. It is one of the Nanaimo Lakes.

== See also ==
- List of lakes of British Columbia
