= Nanaimo Lakes =

Chain of lakes on Vancouver Island, Canada

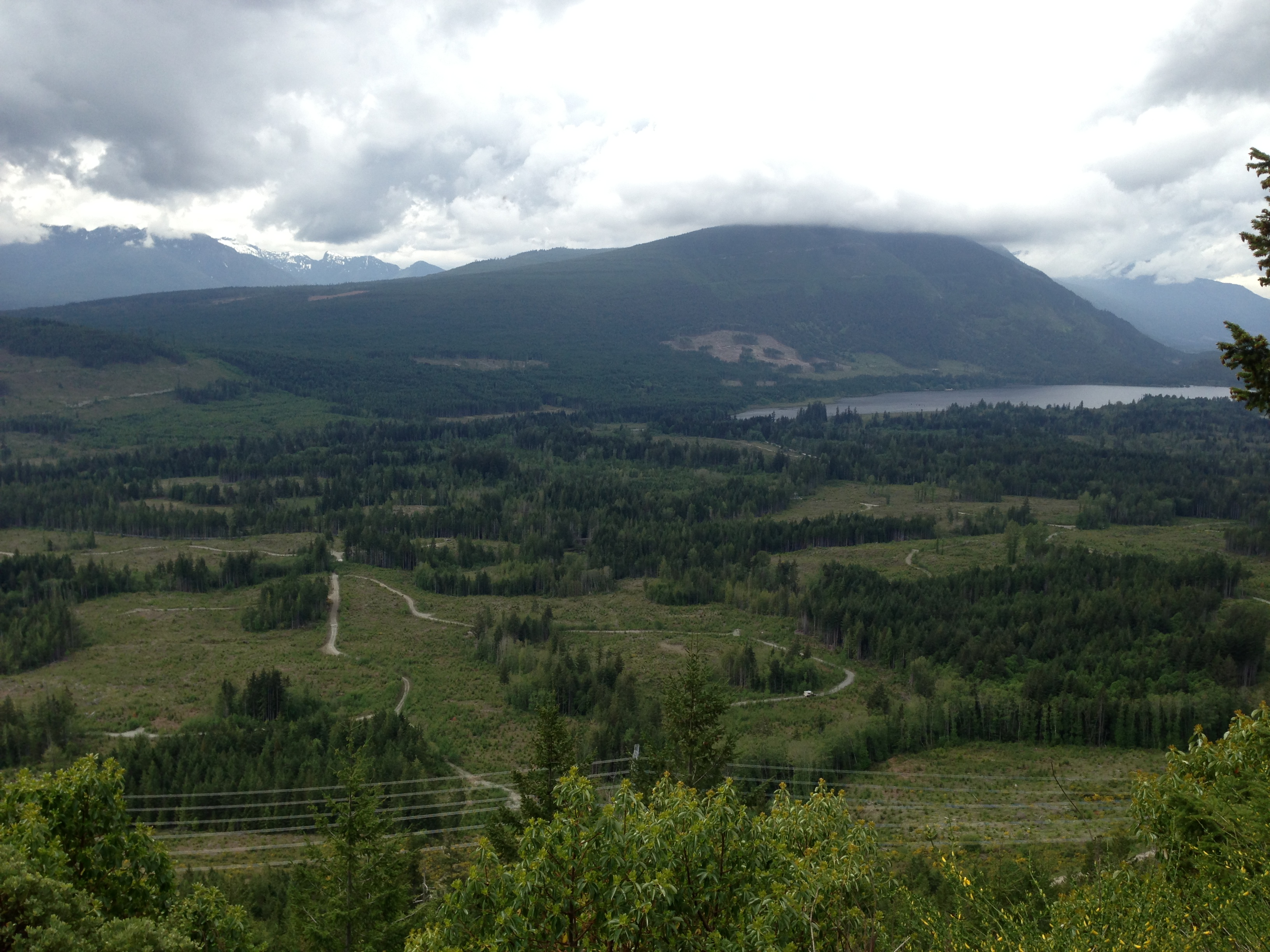
- First Lake

- Location within Vancouver Island
- Location: Regional District of Nanaimo, Vancouver Island, British Columbia
- Coordinates: 49°06′00″N 124°10′15″W
- Etymology: Snuneymuxw First Nation – city of Nanaimo
- Part of: Nanaimo River
- Catchment area: At least 23,000 hectares (57,000 acres)
- Basin countries: Canada
- Max. length: 4 miles (6.4 km)
- Surface elevation: 210 metres (690 ft)

Nanaimo Lakes are a chain of four lakes composed of three natural—First, Second, and Third Lakes—and one man-made, dammed lake, Fourth Lake, on the upper Nanaimo River, on Vancouver Island in British Columbia, Canada.

== Geography ==
The lakes are in a highland transitional area between the southern Vancouver Island Ranges and the Nanaimo Lowland.

The 1:50,000 topographic map quadrangle 92F1 Nanaimo Lakes, published by Natural Resources Canada, is centred on the lakes. Lake names do not appear on all online mapping services, and Third Lake, not listed by the Watershed Roundtable, but listed in a 1919 guide, and on the Natural Resources Canada map, may not appear on some maps at all. A lake with a dam at the north end, named "Fourth Lake", is also shown on the map. First Lake and Second Lake, at c. 210 metres above sea level, are connected by a short stream. Fourth Lake Dam is privately owned and impounds 38,000,000 cubic metres (1.3×10^{9} cu ft) of water, used for a paper mill.

- First Lake 49°05′45″N 124°10′00″W, natural, about 3 kilometres (1.9 mi) long
- Second Lake 49°05′45″N 124°13′00″W, natural, about 3 kilometres (1.9 mi) long
- Third Lake 49°05′10″N 124°19′12″W, natural, much smaller than the others
- Fourth Lake 49°03′31″N 124°25′12″W, a reservoir, about 4 kilometres (2.5 mi) long and 2 km^{2} in area

== Parks and recreation ==
Timberwest owns four campsites on private land surrounding First Lake. The lake was stocked with up to 30,000 salmon or trout per year for recreational fishing beginning in 1905 through the early 21st century. Fourth Lake can be kayaked.

== Nanaimo Lakes fire balloon ==
In March, 1945, a Fu-Go balloon bomb made in Yamaguchi Prefecture and launched from Japan landed at the lakes. Its firing circuits malfunctioned; it failed to detonate and was recovered and analyzed by a Canadian–American intelligence effort.

== See also ==
- List of lakes of British Columbia
