= Nanaimo River =

River on Vancouver Island, Canada

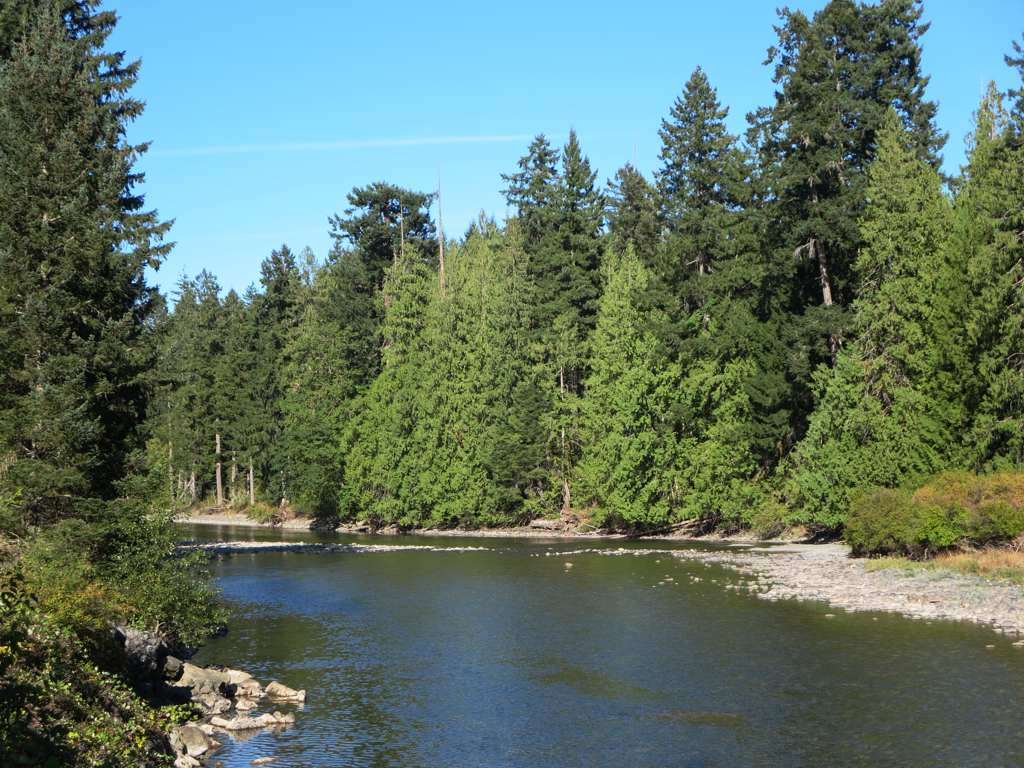

- Location of river mouth Nanaimo River (Canada)

Location
- Country: Canada
- Province: British Columbia

Physical characteristics
- Source: Mount Hooper
  - location: Vancouver Island Ranges
  - coordinates: 49.0577°N 124.5091°W
- Mouth: Nanaimo Harbour
  - location: Nanaimo
  - coordinates: 49.1383°N 123.8956°W
  - elevation: 0 m (0 ft)
- Length: 78 km (48 mi)
- Basin size: 95,000 ha (230,000 acres)

Basin features
- Tributaries
  - left: North Nanaimo River
  - right: South Nanaimo River; Haslam Creek
- Waterbodies: Second Lake; First Lake

Nanaimo River is a river on Vancouver Island, British Columbia, Canada, located near the city of Nanaimo on the island's east coast. Its headwaters are in the Vancouver Island Ranges of central Vancouver Island and its mouth, the Nanaimo River estuary, is at the south end of Nanaimo Harbour in the Strait of Georgia. The estuary is part of the Pacific Estuary Conservation Program.

The river and its drainage basin contain a wide range of industrial and recreational activities. Logging and coal mining were a couple of the earliest industrial operations. While coal mining ceased in the first half of the 20th century, logging continues to be important. Morden Colliery Historic Provincial Park is one of the few places left near the river that links to the region's coal mining history. Due to the lack of arable land, agriculture never became an important industry. In 1931, South Fork Dam was built upstream on the South Nanaimo River to supply water to the city of Nanaimo. In 1974, an additional dam and reservoir were built farther upstream on a tributary of the South Nanaimo River to increase the water supply for the city. In 2000, the South Fork Dam was upgraded to produce Hydroelectricity.

Two major highways cross the river. The Trans-Canada Highway crosses the river just north of Cassidy and farther downstream Highway 19 crosses on the north side of Cedar. At the point where the Trans-Canada Highway crosses the river, the Esquimalt & Nanaimo Railway also crosses it. On the east side of Cassidy, just of the south bank of a major tributary of the river, Haslam Creek, is the Nanaimo Airport

All along the river, and throughout its watershed, there are plenty of lakes and recreational opportunities, including boating, camping, hiking, bungee jumping, and rock climbing. There are still pockets of old growth forest left within easy access to the public, such as at the Nanaimo River Regional Park.

== First Nations ==
Along the Nanaimo River are the archaeological remains of five fall and winter Coast Salish villages. The villages are called Solachwan, Tewahlchin, Anuweenis, Kwalsiarwahl, and Ishihan. The villages were often occupied until April, in which the Coast Salish would then travel to Gabriola Island to hunt. The Nanaimo River was the lifeblood of the Coast Salish people living in modern-day Nanaimo.

The Nanaimo River is part of the traditional territory of the Snuneymuxw and Stz'uminus First Nations. In total, the Snuneymuxw have six Indian reserves in the Nanaimo area. Nanaimo Town 1 is located on the west side of Nanaimo Harbour, just south of downtown Nanaimo. Three others, Nanaimo River 2, 3, and 4 are located on the Nanaimo River delta. Gabriola Island 5 is on Gabriola Island and Ma-guala 6 is on a small island in Degnen Bay on the south-west coast of Gabriola Island.

== Course ==
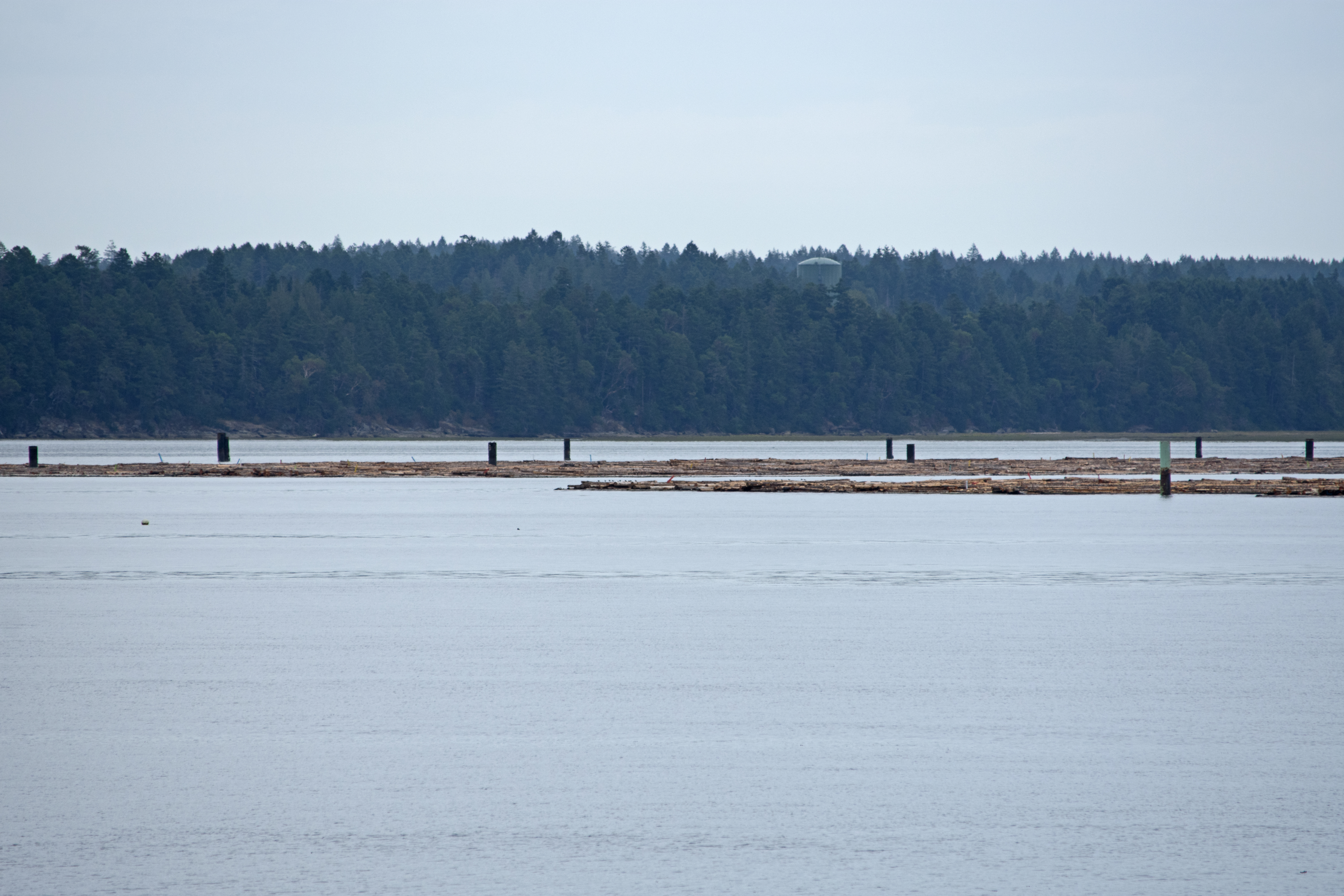
Nanaimo River estuary with a log boom and Duke Point in the background

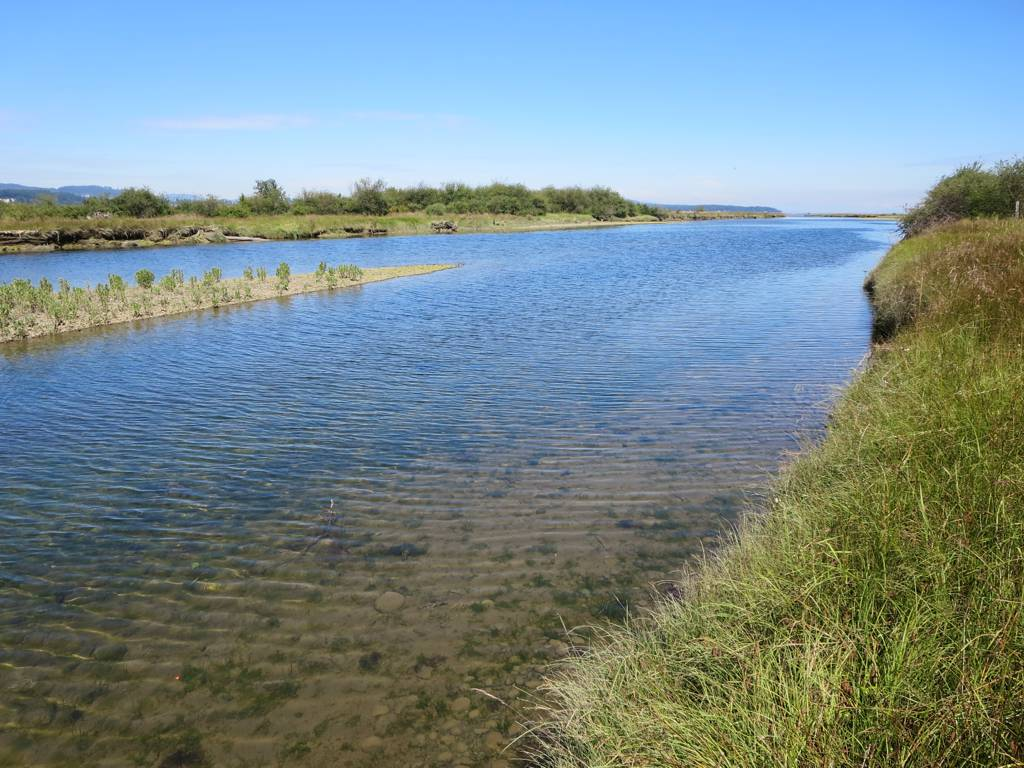
The mouth of the Nanaimo River

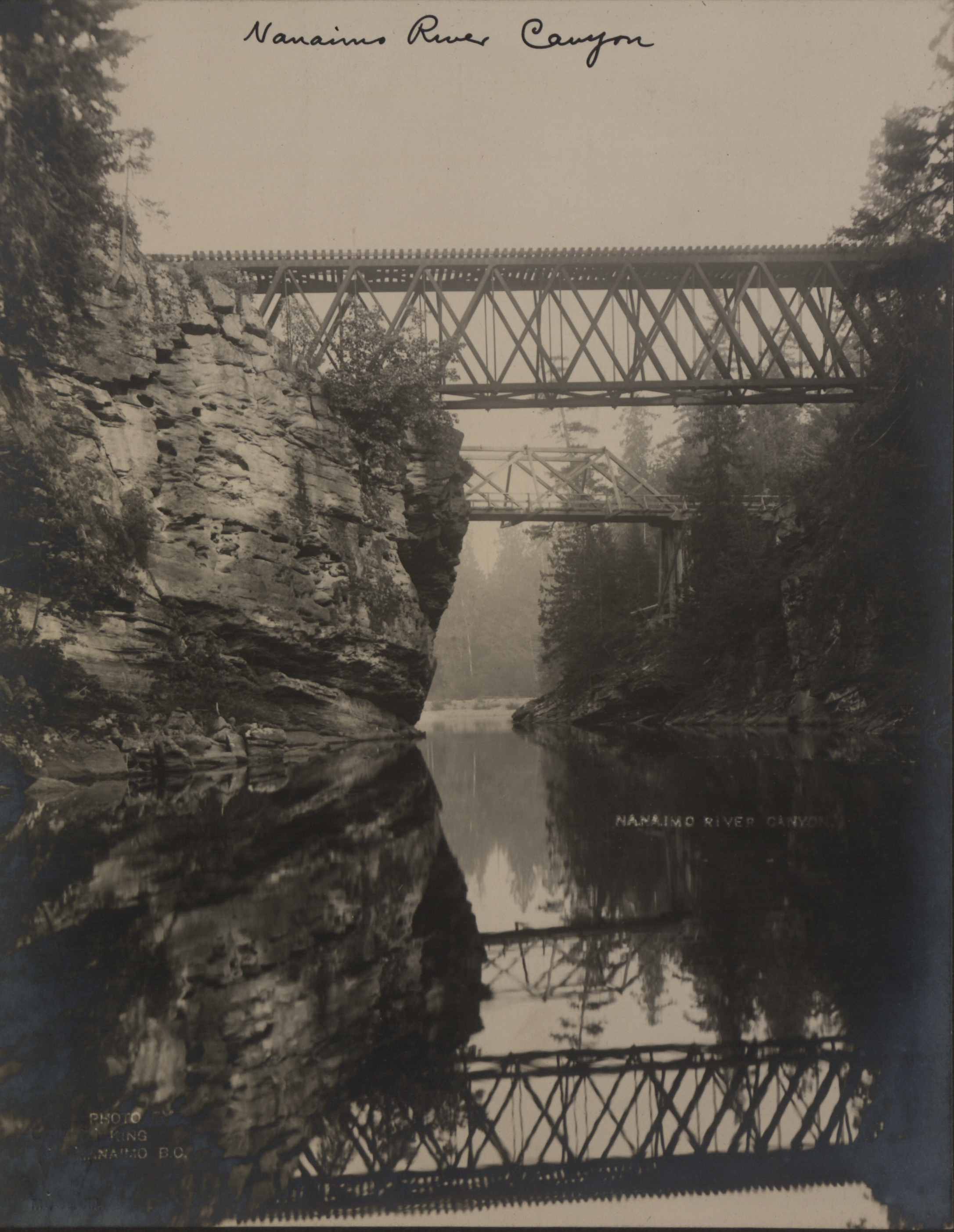
Nanaimo River canyon showing Esquimalt & Nanaimo Railway bridge and road bridge

The source of the Nanaimo River is the eastern slopes of Mount Hooper. Mount Hooper is on the drainage divide that separates rivers flowing eastward towards the Strait of Georgia and westwards into the open Pacific Ocean. The western slopes of Mount Hooper are in the Nitinat River's watershed.

From its source, the Nanaimo River flows east for most of its length then north into the south end of Nanaimo Harbour. There are two lakes, First and Second, along the river's course and multiple tributaries and other lakes in its watershed.

Other than the aforementioned Indian reserves, the small community of Cedar is the only community along the banks of the river. Other small communities, such as Cassidy (which straddles Haslam Creek), South Wellington, and Extension are found nearby in the river's lower watershed.

The total watershed area of the river is 95,000 ha (230,000 acres) and the mainstem river channel from the source to the mouth is 78 kilometres (48 mi). The section from First Lake to the harbour is about 56 kilometres (35 mi) long.

== Tributaries ==
The Nanaimo River has three main tributaries and several smaller ones. The North Nanaimo River, often referred to as North Fork, starts south-west of Okay Mountain and travels south and joins with the Nanaimo River at the outflow of First Lake. The South Nanaimo River, often referred to as South Fork, starts at Rheinhart Lake and flows north and meets the mainstem a short distance downstream from the North Fork. Almost the entirety of the South Fork watershed is restricted to public access as that's the source of Nanaimo's water. The watershed itself is 230 km^{2} (89 sq mi) and is privately owned by Timberlands. An agreement between Timberlands and the city of Nanaimo was formed to safeguard the drinking water supply. Haslam Creek is the other main tributary. Its source is only a short distance east of South Nanaimo River's source, Rheinhart Lake. While South Nanaimo travels north to meet the main stem, Haslam Creek flows east-northeast to meet the Nanaimo River near the Nanaimo River Fish Hatchery and Nanaimo River Regional Park.

Nanaimo River tributaries from the headwaters to mouth

- Sadie Creek
- Rockyrun Creek
- Green Creek
  - Bell Creek
  - Fleece Creek
- Rush Creek
- Dash Creek
  - Deadhorse Creek
- North Nanaimo River
  - Blackjack Creek
    - Anderson Creek
- Wolf Creek
- Price Creek
- South Nanaimo River
  - Jump Creek
  - Dunsmuir Creek
  - Whisky-jack Creek
- Boulder Creek
  - Manson Creek
- Elkhorn Creek
- Berkley Creek
- Stark Creek
- Haslam Creek
  - North Haslam Creek
  - Hokkanen Creek

== Lakes and reservoirs ==
A chain of four lakes, collectively called the Nanaimo Lakes, follow the river's course. Only First and Second Lake, though, are actually part of the river. Third Lake is connected via a short stream to Nanaimo River, just west of Second Lake. Fourth Lake is a man-made reservoir along Sadie Creek that is used to supply water for Harmac Pacific. Two other man-made lakes, Jump Lake and South Fork Reservoir, are operated by the city of Nanaimo and supply water to Nanaimo and the surrounding area. Other notable lakes in the watershed include Blackjack Lake, Quennell Lake, Michael Lake, Crystal Lake, Blind Lake, and Whisky Lake.

=== Jump Lake Dam ===
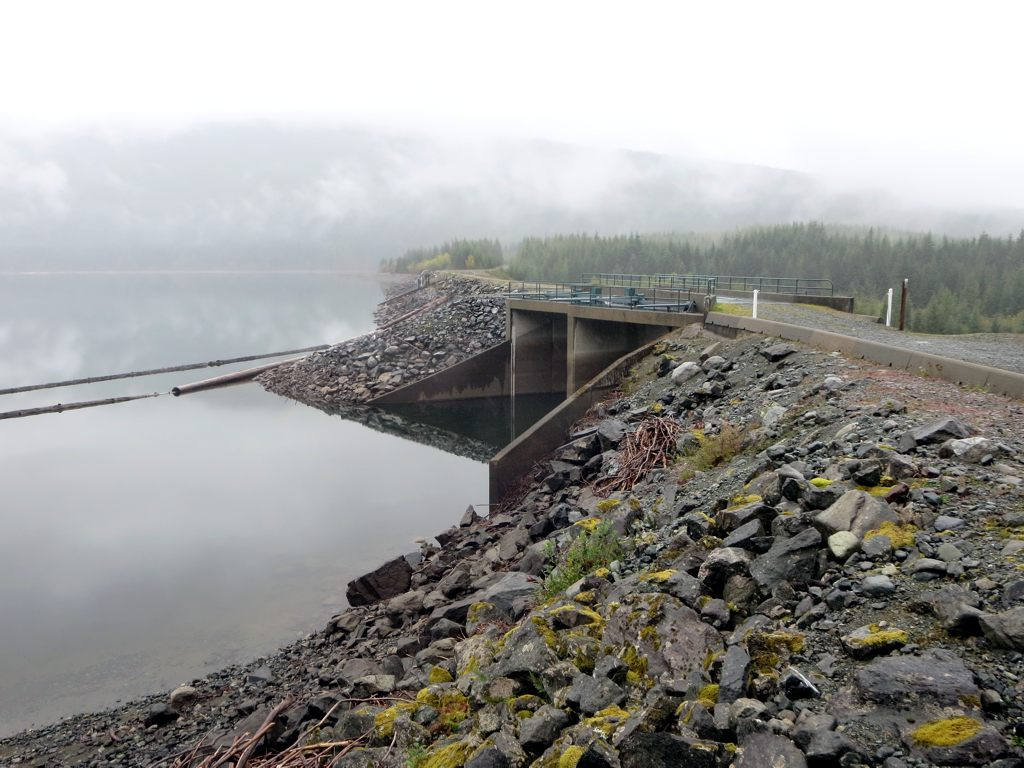
Jump Lake Dam

Jump Lake Dam is an earthen dam along the course of Jump Creek, which starts at Butler Peak and flows northward where it meets the South Nanaimo River at the same spot as east flowing Dunsmuir Creek. Jump Lake Dam was built in 1974 to create a stable source of drinking water for Nanaimo and area. It can hold 17,000,000 m^{3} (14,000 acre⋅ft) of water, which is enough to supply every home in Nanaimo for a year. Water levels in Jump Lake are regulated so that downstream South Fork Reservoir remains at full supply level all the time and other reservoirs downstream have a constant supply of water.

=== South Fork Dam ===
Farther down stream, along the South Nanaimo River, about where Whisky-jack Creek meets South Nanaimo River, is South Fork Reservoir. South Fork Reservoir was created in 1931 with the completion of South Fork Dam. The dam is 50.3 m (165 ft) wide and 30.5 m (100 ft) tall and is built of unreinforced concrete. The reservoir holds 2,000,000 m^{3} (1,600 acre⋅ft) of water and it is kept full as Nanaimo's water delivery system is gravity fed. Two pipelines, one 750 mm (30 in) and the other 1,200 mm (47 in) in diameter, carry water downstream to Nanaimo, where there are additional holding reservoirs. The 750 mm (30 in) pipeline was built in 1954 and has a capacity of 50,000 m^{3} (41 acre⋅ft) of water a day. The other pipeline was completed in 1993 and has a capacity of 190,000 m^{3} (150 acre⋅ft) a day. In 2000, South Fork Dam was upgraded to produce hydroelectricity for local uses.

There are nine balancing reservoirs located throughout the city to meet peak domestic demand. The first balancing reservoir was built at Lost Lake in Nanaimo's north end in 1969. That was followed by reservoirs at College Park and Rutherford Road. During the 1980s, additional reservoirs were built at Duke Point Industrial Park, Langara Drive, and Tanya Drive. More recently, another reservoir was added near Extension in 2010 and in 2014 the open reservoir on Nanaimo Lakes Road was replaced by a new reservoir and energy recovery facility.

== Parks and recreation ==
The Nanaimo River Regional Park is a regional park near the end of the river in the Regional District of Nanaimo. In 1999 and 2000, The Land Conservancy of British Columbia (TLC) purchased the last two remaining intact riparian zones on the lower Nanaimo River. The site contains two parcels totalling about 56 ha (140 acres) of old growth Douglas fir with undisturbed river bank. One parcel is 16.2 ha (40 acres) and the other is 40.5 ha (100 acres). TLC applied for creditor protection in 2013 and on 30 September 2015, 26 properties, including the two on the Nanaimo River, were transferred to the Nature Conservancy of Canada. Shortly thereafter, the Nature Conservancy of Canada transferred the two parcels over to the Nature Trust of British Columbia. Besides conservation, Nanaimo River Regional Park offers walking / cycling trails, swimming, and wildlife viewing.

The river has a notable canyon, which is the site of WildPlay Element Parks's bungee jumping operation. The bridge used for bungee jumping is North America's first purpose built, legal bridge for bungee jumping.

Upstream, and to the west of WildPlay Element Park, is a rock-climbing area with several rock climbs of varying difficulty.

Along the course of the river, there are many popular swimming holes. There are deep pools, underwater caves, waterfalls, rocky beaches, and strong currents.

In 1963, a ski hill and lodge were built on Green Mountain (49°03′24″N 124°20′32″W), south-west of Third Lake and south-east of Forth Lake. Green Mountain Ski Hill was run by volunteers and operated until 1984. In 1984, the lodge and T-bar were vandalised. It was deemed too expensive to repair and the ski hill was permanently closed.

On one of Nanaimo River's main tributaries, Haslam Creek, there's a suspension bridge across the creek that's part the Trans Canada Trail. The trail leads to Timberland Lake. Also along Haslam Creek are two golf courses, Cottonwood Golf Course and Rondalyn Resort. Rondalyn Resort is also an RV campground. Another campground just downstream of Rondalyn is Birds Nest Campground.

== Nanaimo River Fish Hatchery ==
From the Nanaimo River Fish Hatchery's inception in 1979 until 2004, it was operated by Community Futures Central Island. In 2004, the non-profit Nanaimo River Stewardship Society was formed and currently operates the facility relying heavily on volunteers and donations.

The annual hatchery production is as follows:

Fish species	Production
Nanaimo River fall chinook	450,000
Nanaimo River summer chinook	250,000
Chemainus River chinook	75,000
Coho fry	170,000
Coho smolts	80,000
Chum	500,00
Pinks	1,000,000
Total:	2,525,000

== Flora and fauna ==
The Nanaimo River watershed supports pockets of old growth Douglas fir forest. The Douglas fir forests are part of the Georgia-Puget Basin Ecoregion and were recently classified as the 65th of 77 most significant and threatened places in Canada.

A variety of animals, such as Vancouver Island marmots, cougars, wolves, golden eagles, and various species of deer call the mountains of the watershed home. The Nanaimo River is also regarded by anglers as one of the best steelhead rivers in the country.

== See also ==
- List of rivers of British Columbia
- List of protected areas of British Columbia
- Chase River
