= Nanaimo River climbing area =

The Nanaimo River climbing area is located near the city of Nanaimo, adjacent to the Nanaimo River. The rock is mainly sandstone and conglomerate. The crag is Sunny Side. This is aptly named as Sunny Side is located on the north side of the river. During the summer the water warms up to around 24–25 °C (75–77 °F), so the river is visited by swimmers, kayakers and fishermen.

== History ==
Bolted routes started being set during the late eighties / early nineties. Nanaimo River is not, and has never been, a developed or maintained park.

== Sunny Side ==
=== Getting there ===
Driving north past the Nanaimo Airport, take the first right off the #1 highway onto Nanaimo River Road. This road will pass under the highway, and cross over railroad tracks. Continue until major power lines pass over head. This is where you park. Walk under the power lines to the south. The trail will fork into three: the first right will take you to the top of the cliffs, the second right will take you down some steps to the bottom of the cliffs, and the final path continues to the left and takes you to the swimming area.

=== Climbs ===
There are several cliff faces on the Sunny Side. The First Cliffs are the first set of cliffs you pass when approaching from the stairs. The Upper Deck is the higher portion of the cliffs that can either be approached from the top via the first path turning off. The Lower Deck is directly underneath the Upper Deck, and can either be approached by a rappel, or by scrambling over rocks from an approach path between the first cliffs, and the Upper Deck.

==== First Cliffs ====
Climb name	Rating	Protection	Description
God is AFK	5.8	bolted	
Lineage	5.8	bolted	

==== Upper Deck ====
Climb name	Rating	Protection	First Ascent	Description
Bigger and Better	5.11b	6 bolts	Greg Soerensen	
Feeling Gravity's Pull	5.10a	bolted	Chris Gill	
Finger in the Goo	5.10b	bolted		
Green	5.8	bolted	Chris Gill	
Jamaica Jerk Off	5.7	bolted	Greg Soerensen	
New Shoes	5.11c	bolted	Chris Gill and Ian	
Bat Shit	5.10a	trad (gear to 2")		
Titanium Man	5.11b	10 bolts		
The Becky Route	5.9	7 bolts		
Psycho Babble	5.9	trad (gear to 1.5")		
Pseudo Placenta	5.11a	bolted		
Barking Burritto	5.10a	mixed (2 bolts + thin cams and nuts)		
Eyore	5.9	6 bolts		

==== Lower Deck ====
Climb name	Rating	Protection	First Ascent	Description
Bulgung Flank	5.9	bolted	Ryan Kurytnik	
Fluid Thrill	5.10b	bolted	Ryan Kurytnik	
Butterscotch Puddin'	5.8	trad (gear to 2")		
High Tide	5.11d	5 bolts	Ryan Kurytnik	
Lower Momentum	5.10b	4 bolts	Ryan Kurytnik	
Turbulence	5.11c	bolted	Ryan Kurytnik	has a runout start (see Glossary of climbing terms)
Wishbone	5.8	trad (gear to 1.5" & 1 )		
Dink Charmer	5.9	top rope or trad		Minimal placement opportunities for trad; top rope would be safer
Junkyard	5.12a	2 bolts		runout to the anchors
