= Cassidy, British Columbia =

Community in British Columbia, Canada

Cassidy
- Location of Cassidy in British Columbia Cassidy (British Columbia)
- Coordinates: 49°3′27″N 123°52′39″W
- Country: Canada
- Province: British Columbia
- Regional district: Nanaimo

Population (2008)
  - Total: 1,002
- Time zone: UTC−07:00 (PT)
- Area codes: 250, 778, 236, & 672
- Highways: Highway 1

Cassidy is an unincorporated community straddling Haslam Creek. near the east coast of southern Vancouver Island, British Columbia, Canada. The location on BC Highway 19 is about 98 kilometres (61 mi) by road north-west of Victoria, and 14 kilometres (9 mi) south of Nanaimo.

The area is served by the coast-spanning Island Highway, the Island Rail Corridor, and the Nanaimo Airport.

== Name origin ==
Thomas Cassidy farmed in the Oyster district from the 1870s. The homestead was called Cassidy's place or Tom Cassidy's. In 1884, his initial 24-hectare (60-acre) preemption was converted into a Crown grant. During the railway construction from 1884 to 1886, he supplied the camps near the Nanaimo River with milk and vegetables. By the early 1900s, the locality was known as Cassidy's Siding.

His son, Thomas William Cassidy, sold 211 hectares (522 acres) to the Department of National Defence in 1942 for a Royal Canadian Air Force glider pilot training facility. The site is now home to the Nanaimo Airport.

== Coalmine ==
In 1918, Granby Consolidated Mining, Smelting and Power Company began working the Douglas coal seam. However, the sandy overburden made mining difficult. At the peak of production in 1921 and 1922, 450 men worked each shift. In 1928, the mine had a total of 500 employees, and 200 worked each eight-hour shift, producing 1,000 tons. In 1932, the Granby mine ceased operation because of the coal seam exhausting, the rising popularity of oil, the dangerous condition of the mine, and the Great Depression.

Seven different mines operated in the vicinity from 1917 to 1953 producing over 2.5 million tonnes of coal.

== Early community ==
In 1919, the company established the settlement of Cassidy. The model town included 19 houses of various sizes connected to power, water, and sewer, with a provision for a further 50 residences. The tree lined streets had grass verges and sidewalks. A single men's concrete dormitory, accommodating workers in 76 rooms, had light, hot and cold water and steam heat. Equally, the mess house had all modern conveniences. The recreation ground facilitated a range of sports activities.

The town, which covered 40 hectares (100 acres), had paved streets, a department store and a theatre. In 1932, when the mine closed, residents abandoned their houses. In March 1936, the remnants of the town were auctioned and largely removed. By 1951, only a caretaker and skeletal concrete structures remained.

== Railway ==
From 1907 to 1908, a station briefly existed 2 kilometres (1.2 mi) south of Coburn. A decade later at Cassidy, a 4.8 km (3 mi) spur line connected to the E&N Railway, from where coal travelled by rail to Ladysmith. In 1919, the Cassidy train station opened, and was a flag stop when Via Rail on Vancouver Island ceased in 2011. Adjacent stops were about 12 kilometres (7 mi) south to Ladysmith, and 3 kilometres (2 mi) north to South Wellington. Immediately south of Vowels Rd, not even a signpost marked the flag stop location in its final years.

== Cassidy Hotel/Inn ==
Erected in 1914, the building was a bunkhouse for Dunsmuir coal surveyors and engineers. Becoming the community recreation centre, a liquor licence was subsequently issued in 1925. The 1953 paving of the Island Highway boosted business. Patronage waning, the inn was revived as a neighbourhood pub in 1983. In 2013, the building represented an Alaskan bar in the Superman movie Man of Steel. Facing a bleak future, the establishment closed about 2014. In 2016, after a demolition reprieve, fire gutted the vacant building on the south corner of Beck Rd.

== Later community ==
Logging revived the community throughout the 1940s and 1950s. The Cassidy Drive-In operated 1954–1992. Undergoing significant development since the 1970s, the Ray Collishaw Air Terminal serves Nanaimo. The residential area is a bedroom community for Nanaimo. Several commercial enterprises line the highway. There is a camping, RV park, and golf course to the west to on Haslam Creek called Rondalyn Resort. To the north, also on Haslam Creek, there's another campground called Birds Nest Campground. At Beck Rd are parking, a picnic area, and Cassidy Country Kitchen.

== Notable people ==
- Steven Smith (1989 – 2016) – downhill mountain biker
