= Cable Bay Trail =

Hiking trail in British Columbia, Canada

Coordinates: 49.1264°N 123.8277°W

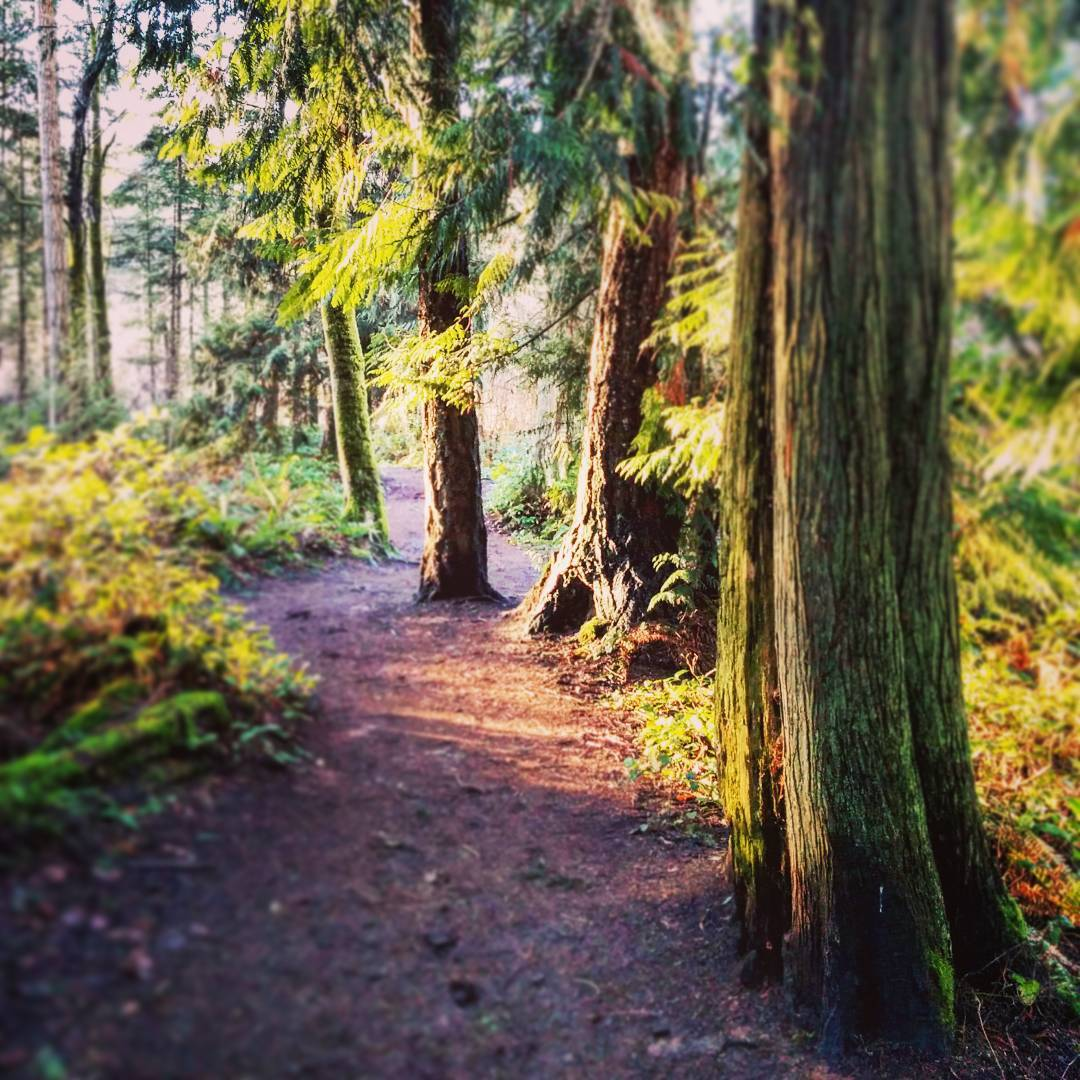
- Trail through the upper forest
- Length: 2 km (1.2 mi)
- Location: Cedar, British Columbia
- Trailheads: Nicola Road
- Use: Hiking
- Elevation gain/loss: 90m
- Highest point: 90m
- Lowest point: 0m
- Difficulty: Easy
- Sights: Beaches, old growth forest, birds and marine mammals
- Hazards: Moderately steep section of trail and slippery rocks

The Cable Bay Trail is a 2 km hiking trail located on Vancouver Island, British Columbia, Canada. The trail has been ranked among the top ten forest walks in the Vancouver Island Region.

The trail is accessed via Nicola Road in Cedar. The trail winds down to the oceanfront overlooking Gabriola Island through a coastal Douglas Fir forest, which leads down Joan Point Park, a 23-acre waterfront park which provides a vantage point overlooking Dodds Narrows. Dodds Narrows is a narrow tidal passage separating Vancouver Island from Mudge Island, which flows in opposing directions based on tidal flows. The narrows is a hot spot for marine activity and a popular marine passage between Nanaimo and the Southern Gulf Islands. Passage through Dodds Narrows is described in detail in Margaret Sharcott's 1957 book, Troller's Holiday.

The trail also passes through Garry Oak ecosystems, and features in genetic studies of endangered Garry Oak populations.

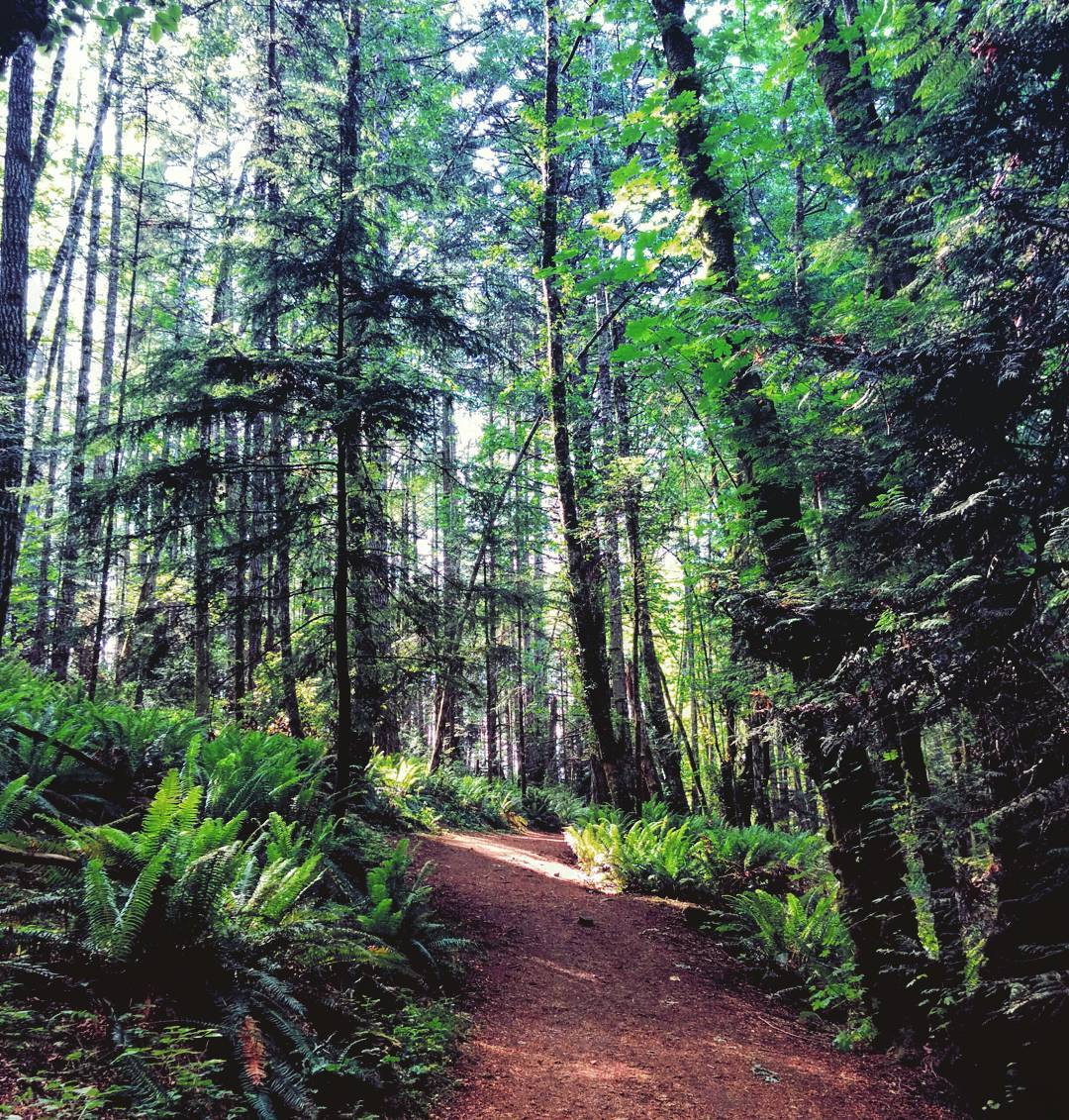
The Cable Bay Trail leading down through the forest

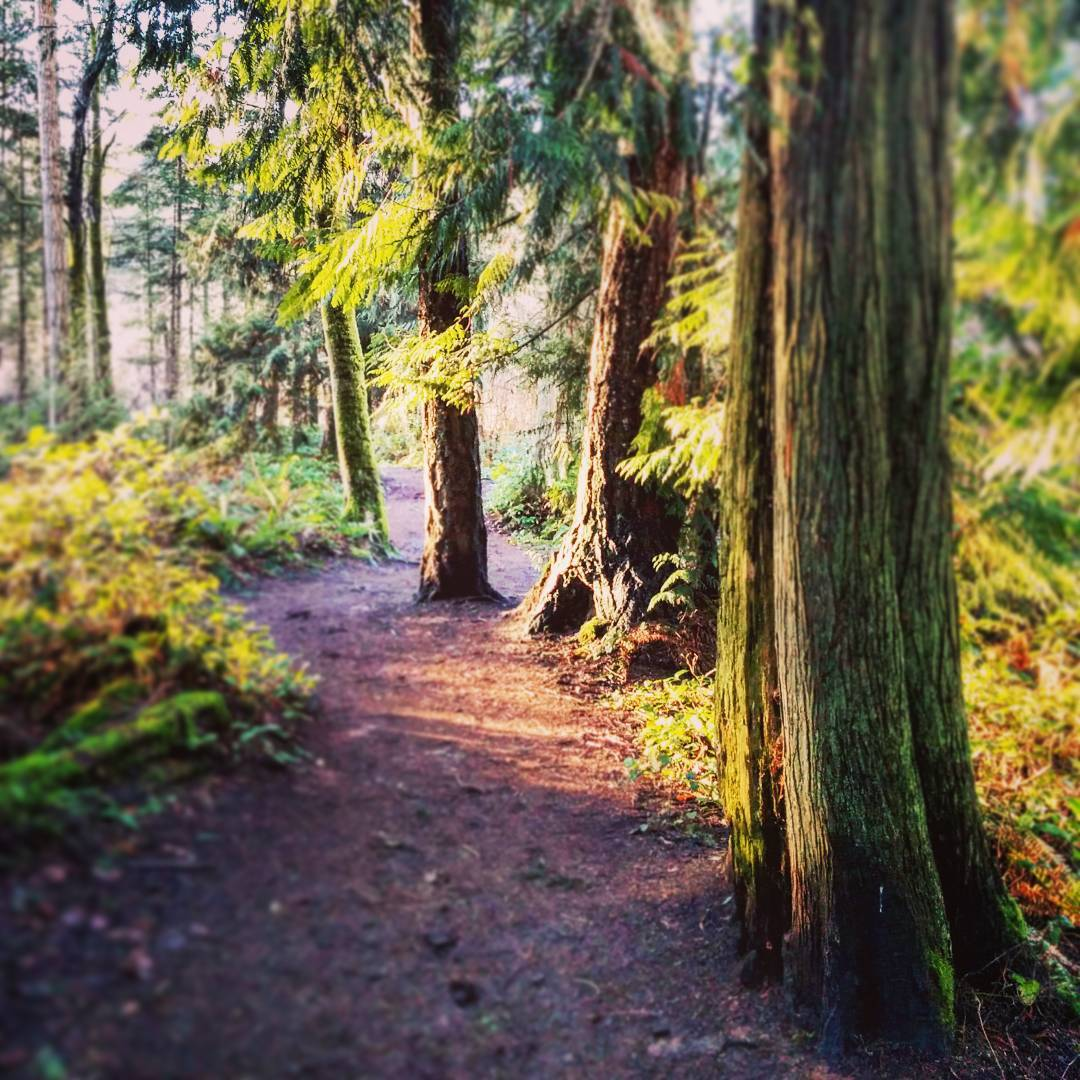
The trail leading through the woods
