= Morden Colliery Historic Provincial Park =

Historic provincial park in Nanaimo Regional District, British Columbia

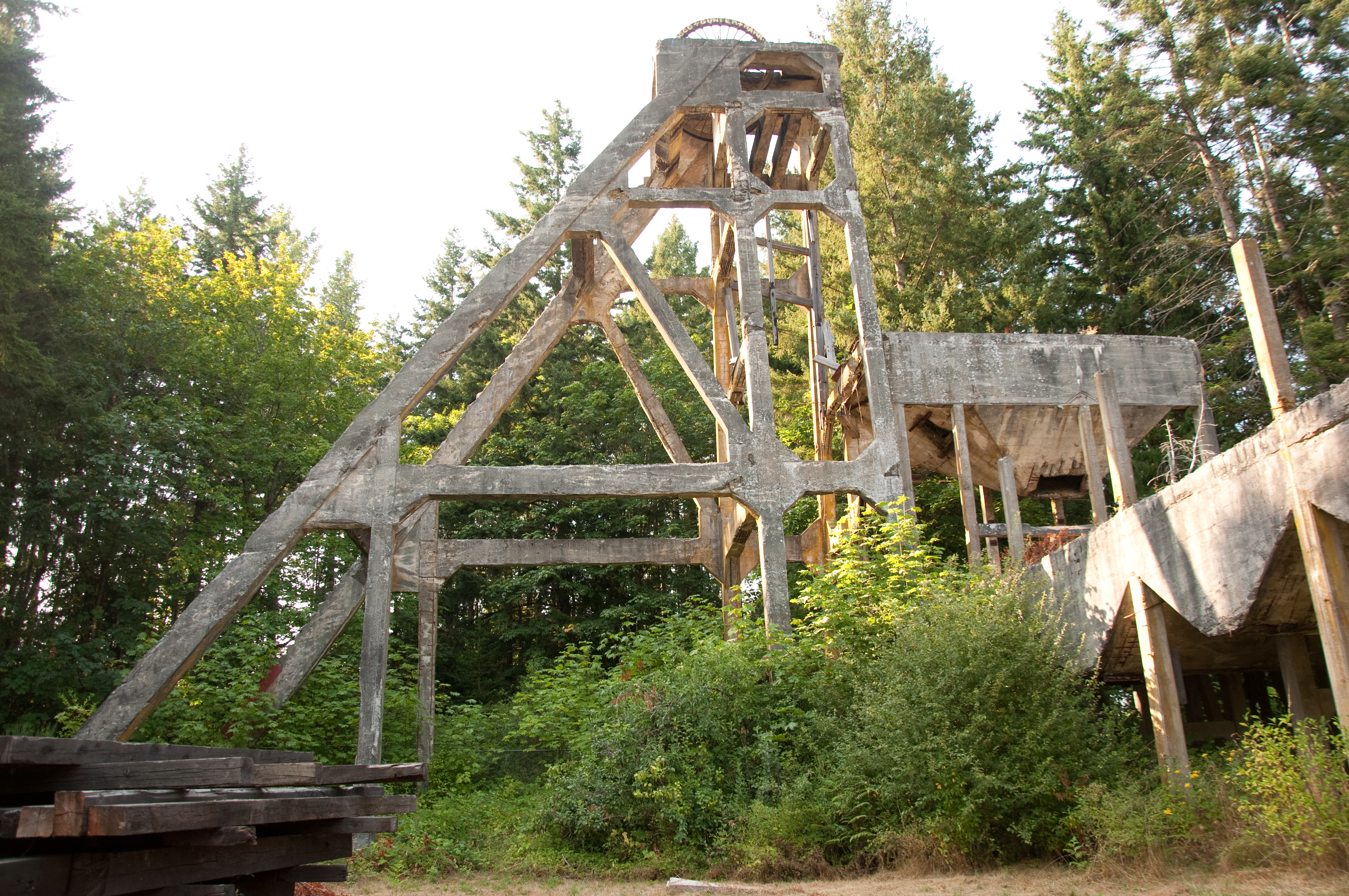
- Remains of headframe/tipple

- Location within Vancouver Island Location within British Columbia Location within Regional District of Nanaimo
- Interactive map of Morden Colliery Historic Provincial Park
- Location: Nanaimo Regional District, British Columbia
- Nearest city: Nanaimo
- Coordinates: 49°05′44″N 123°52′22″W
- Area: 4 ha (9.9 acres)
- Designation: Historic Provincial Park
- Established: 10 January 1972
- Governing body: BC Parks
- Website: BC Parks Morden Colliery

Morden Colliery Historic Provincial Park is a 4-hectare (9.9-acre) historic provincial park near the east coast of southern Vancouver Island, British Columbia. The location off BC Highway 19 is about 102 kilometres (63 mi) by road northwest of Victoria, and 10 kilometres (6 mi) south of Nanaimo.

== History ==
=== Railway ===
In 1909, the Pacific Coast Coal Mining Co. (PCCM) opened a standard-gauge railway line from Fiddick's Junction on the E&N Railway line to Boat Harbour for loading coal into the holds of vessels. The next year, the line extended westward to the Fiddick Colliery. In early 1915, 19 men drowned in the Fiddick mine disaster. Late the next year, all production ceased, and all workers transferred 2.6 kilometres (1.6 mi) southeast to the PCCM Morden Colliery.

=== Morden Colliery ===
On the existing PCCM Fiddick railway line, work commenced on the Morden mine shafts (nos. 3 and 4) in 1912, but the coal seam was not reached until a year later. A yearlong strike in 1913–1914 allowed the new shafts to flood. At this time, the 22.7-metre (74.5 ft) high concrete headframe was constructed. During 1915–1916, work in readying the mine continued. Production commenced in 1917. No. 4 was an air supply and escape shaft.

After being lifted up the no. 3 shaft, each one-ton capacity bucket was side pulled by a bull chain to enable dumping the coal into the tipple, and down a chute into a railway gondola car. A nine-hour shift could produce 1,500 tons. In 1919, extensive underground development work occurred. That year, a large water tank, 14 cottages, two 8-room residences, and a 32-person boarding house, were relocated from the abandoned Fiddick site. In 1921, the pit closed, and PCCM entered bankruptcy the following year.

In 1930, the Canadian Coal and Iron Co. rehabilitated the mine, but closed the same year. In 1935, sawmill equipment was sold, and 40 ore cars and 2 locomotives at the mine were sold for scrap. In 1980, Westland Resources spent $500,000 on exploratory drilling for coal on Morden property, no doubt outside the park boundaries.

=== Later community ===
Although the mine was abandoned, the adjacent settlement remained stable. Logging was prevalent throughout the 1940s and 1950s. The area, which is largely small holdings, soon became a bedroom community for Nanaimo.

=== Park profile ===
In 1972, recognized as a National Historic Site, and designated a provincial historic park, the day-use park remained undeveloped in subsequent years. In 2003, the Friends of Morden Mine (FOMM) organized to save the seven-storey-high headframe/tipple. After the structure continued to deteriorate behind a chain-link fence, the society was on the verge of giving up in 2015.

In 2019, securing a $1.4-million BC government grant, FOMM coordinated the restoration. Temporarily stabilizing the structure with 16 shipping containers, a technique adopted after the Christchurch earthquake, repairs were carried out. Apart from the Muddy, Illinois example, this structure is unique in North America.

== Trail ==
In 1995, the Regional District of Nanaimo began developing a trail eastward through the park along the former PCCM railway right-of-way to the Nanaimo River. Since that time, interpretative plaques have been added. In 2017, a cairn was erected to memorialize the three men who died at Morden, and the estimated 1,000 miners who died in Vancouver Island coal mines. Eventual plans are to bridge the river and continue the trail to Hemer Provincial Park.
