= Hemer Provincial Park =

Provincial park in British Columbia

- IUCN category II (national park)
- Location within Vancouver Island Location within British Columbia
- Interactive map of Hemer Provincial Park
- Location: Cedar Land District, British Columbia, Canada
- Nearest city: Nanaimo, BC
- Coordinates: 49°05′56″N 123°49′52″W
- Area: 109 ha (270 acres)
- Established: May 8, 1981
- Governing body: BC Parks

Hemer Provincial Park is a provincial park in British Columbia, Canada. It is located south of Nanaimo.
