= Snuneymuxw First Nation =

Aboriginal people from Vancouver Island

- Band No. 648
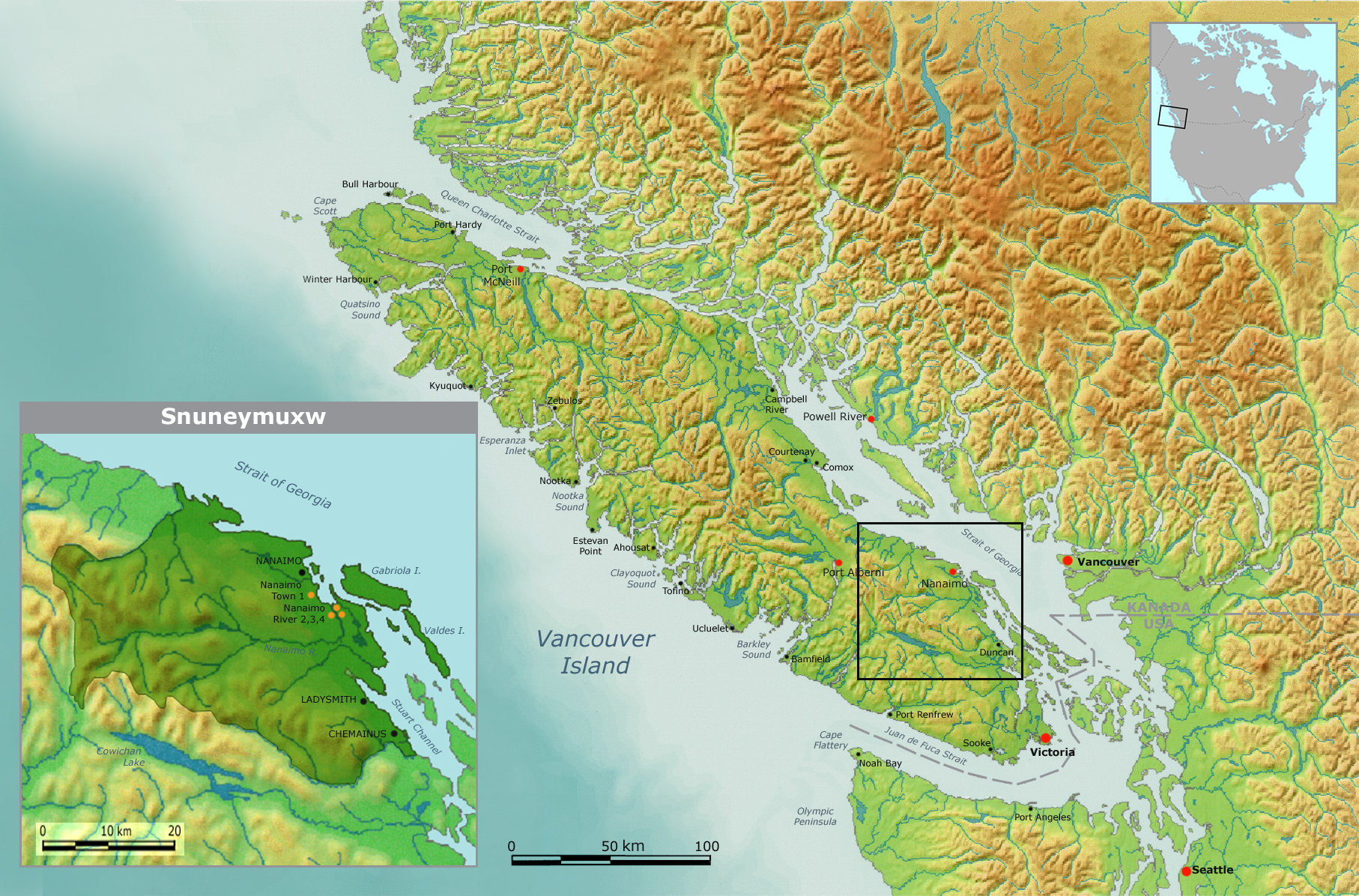
- People: Coast Salish
- Treaty: Douglas Treaties
- Headquarters: Nanaimo
- Province: British Columbia

Land
- Main reserve: Nanaimo River 3
- Land area: 2.6 km^{2} (1.0 sq mi)

Population (2024)
- On reserve: 576
- On other land: 146
- Off reserve: 1265
- Total population: 1987

Government
- Chief: Mike Wyse

Tribal Council
- Naut'sa mawt Tribal Council

Website
- www.snuneymuxw.ca

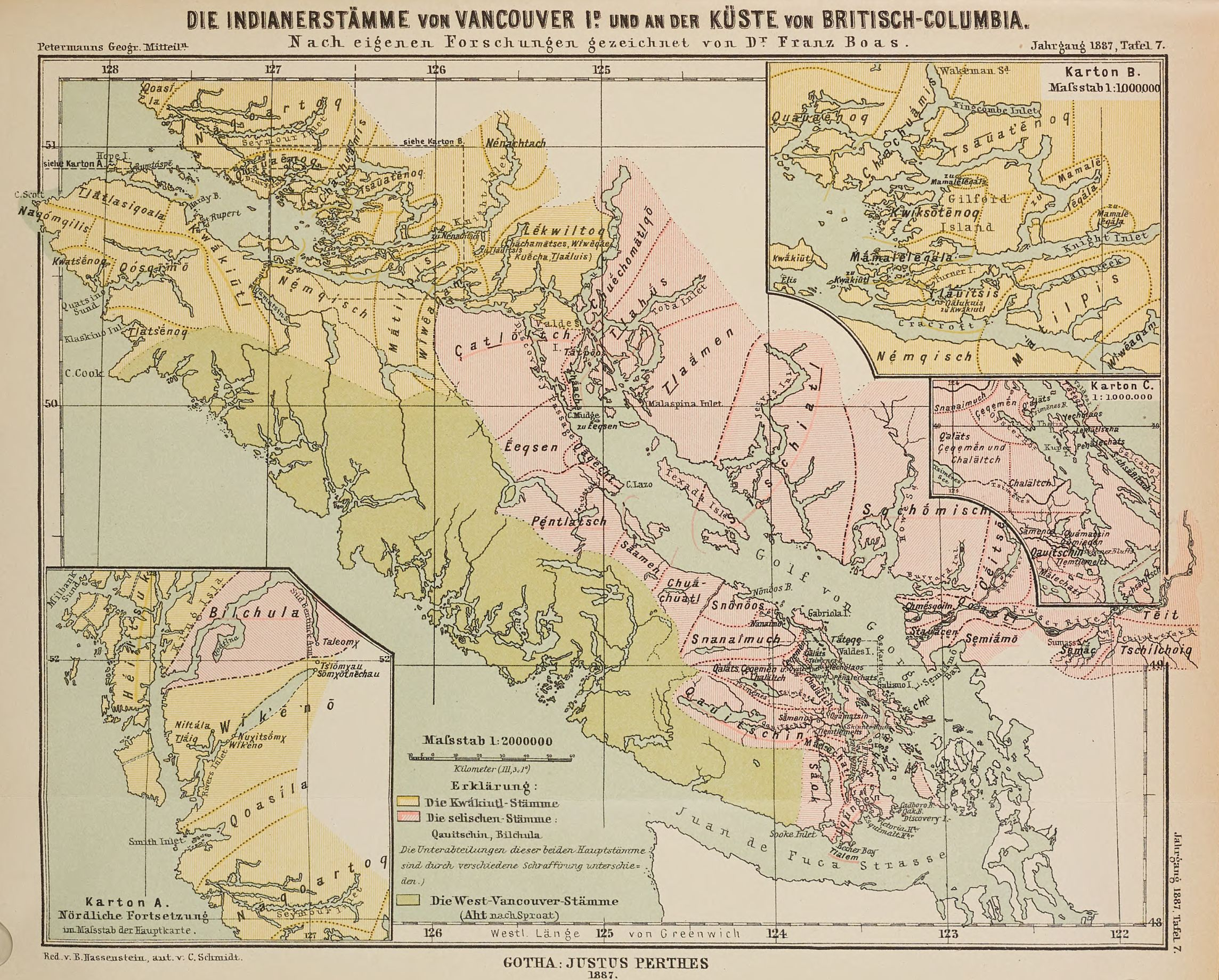
Dr. Franz Boas 1887 map showing Nanaimo territories

Snuneymuxw First Nation (pronounced [snʊˈneɪməxʷ]) is located in and around the city of Nanaimo on east-central Vancouver Island, British Columbia, Canada. The nation previously had also occupied territory along the Fraser River, in British Columbia.

Prior to European colonization of the Americas and the creation of Indian reserves in the nineteenth century, this people occupied a wide region of south-central Vancouver Island, where they had lived for more than 5,000 years. Snuneymuxw Territory extended to the Gulf Islands, and the Fraser River in the British Columbia; it was in the centre of Coast Salish territory. Their language is Hul’qumi’num.

Snuneymuxw First Nation operates Saysutshun (Newcastle Island Marine) Park.

== Language ==
The people of the SFN speak the Hul'q'umi'num dialect of Hul’q’umi’num’, Halq'eméylem, hən̓q̓əmin̓əm. This is a Coast Salish language, part of the Salishan language family.

According to the Snuneymuxw First Nation Language Needs Assessment report of January 2009, published by the First Peoples' Heritage Language & Culture Council (FPHLCC), of a total population of 1560 (with 550 on reserve and 1010 off-reserve), there were 25 people who spoke and understood the language fluently. Eleven of these persons were between the ages of 65–74, 13 were between the ages of 75–84, and one was 85 and over. There were 35 who understood and/or spoke the language somewhat. Four were between the ages of 25–44, 23 were between the ages of 45–54, and 8 were between the ages of 55–64. Some 25 people were learning the language. Of that group, 15 were between the ages of 15–19, 2 were between the ages of 25–44, 4 were between the ages of 45–54, and 4 were between the ages of 55–64.

The language assessment noted that the First Nation had four small reserves at the time. City water had been suspended in 1992 at one reserve because of contamination, and new infrastructure was not built for 20 years. This prevented development of the reserves for such needs as housing, and many people lived off-reserve.

== History ==
Archeological excavations have revealed that the Snuneymuxw had a winter village and burial site in present-day Departure Bay dating to about 3,500 year BP. In 2007 the remains of about 15 individuals were uncovered at the construction site of a future condo development owned by developer Bruce McLay. Madrone Environmental Services from Duncan, BC conducted an archaeological excavation of the site.

Eventually remains of more than 80 people were uncovered. When the late Chief Viola Wyse requested that B.C. Premier Gordon Campbell protect the site, the province purchased it. For a time the site remained "sad, forlorn and neglected", surrounded by a bent chain-link fence and covered in straggled patches of weeds.

In March 2013, as part of the provincial reconciliation agreement with First Nations, this site was transferred to the Snuneymuxw. Referring to this discovery,

Snuneymuxw spokeswoman Geraldine Manson said it is rare to find an undisturbed Snuneymuxw burial site in the Nanaimo area. She said while Snuneymuxw remains have been uncovered at other sites, including the Foundry site downtown [in 2006], they have mostly been disturbed by development activities in the past. Remains are known to have been scattered over large areas as a result.

— 2013

The site of the former Moby Dick Hotel, 1000 Stewart Ave, Nanaimo, was the location of a Snuneymuxw village of historical importance to the First Nation. It is situated at the narrowest point of Newcastle Channel, separating Newcastle Island from Nanaimo.

Former Snuneymuxw Chief White had plans to construct modest facilities on Newcastle Island to deliver new kinds of programming on Coast Salish culture, Newcastle Island's coal mining history, the CPR history, and the canneries history as part of a heritage tourist destination. Snuneymuxw First Nation will be collaborating with Waterfront Holdings Ltd. on current and future waterfront development on Stewart Avenue. The First Nation operates Newcastle Island Marine Provincial Park.

=== Nanaimo Indian Hospital ===
The Nanaimo Indian Hospital served Indian patients and was operated by the federal government of Canada on Snuneymuxw territory from 1946 to 1967. The system of state-run Indian hospitals was deeply intertwined with the institution of residential schools. Like the schools, the hospital system has been documented for having a history of physical and sexual abuse of Indigenous people.

In the summer of 2021, hundreds of potential unmarked graves were identified at the Kamloops Indian Residential School. Other First Nations began to undertake their own surveys of sites of local Indian schools.

In response, Steve Sxwithul'txw of Penelakut First Nation, carver Tom LaFortune, and educator Michele Mundy started a GoFundMe campaign to help First Nations on Vancouver Island conduct their own research around sites of former residential school and the Indian hospital. They will use current technology that does not disturb the ground. On 15 September 2021, the group gave Snuneymuxw First Nation CA$77,000, to help the First Nation conduct a search and to identify possible unmarked graves in and around the former grounds of the hospital.

== Territory and current land base ==
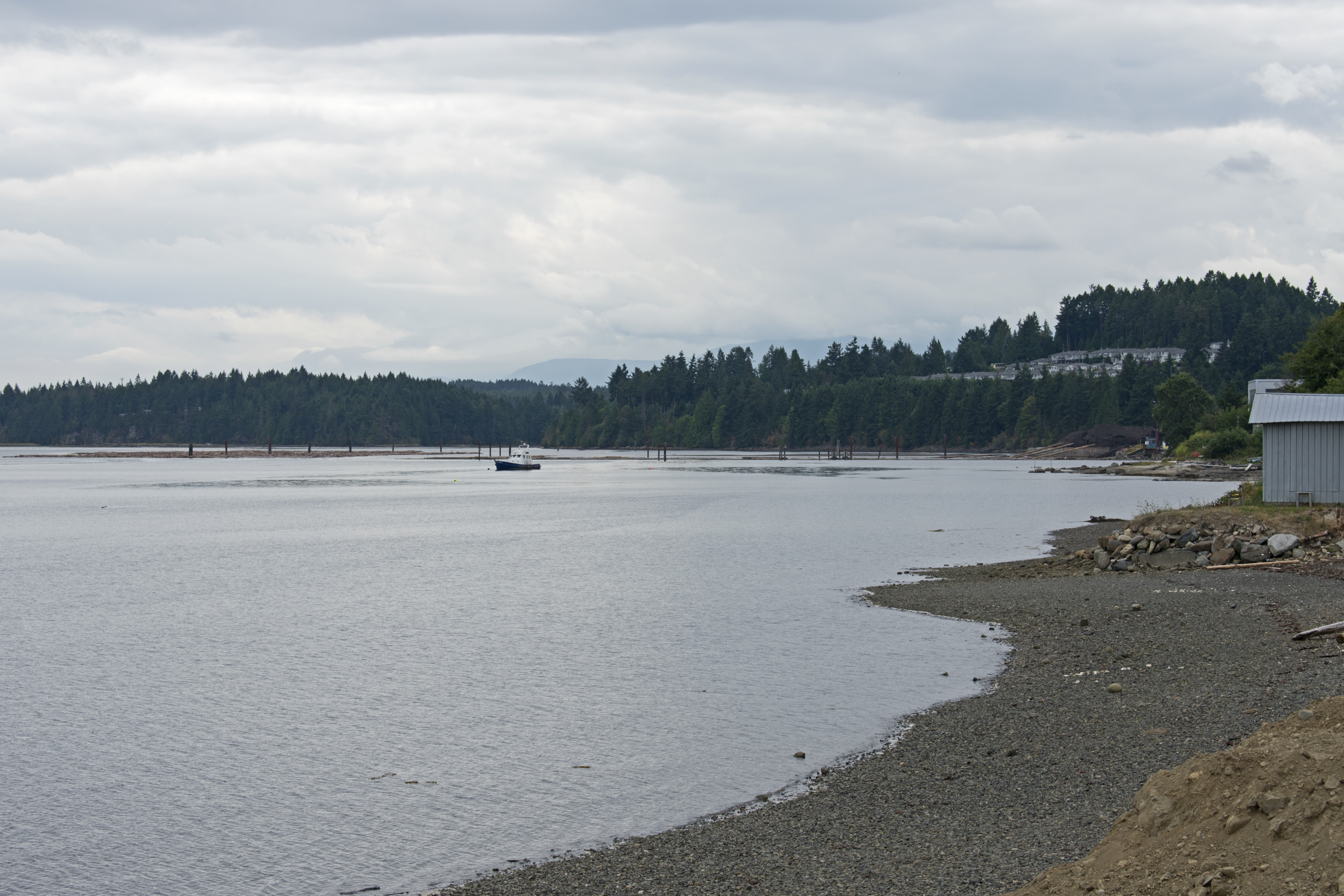
Nanaimo town 1

Snuneymuxw Territory on the eastern coast of Vancouver Island, the Gulf Islands, and the Fraser River in the British Columbia was in the centre of Coast Salish territory.

The band's traditional territory covers 980 km^{2} (380 sq mi). They share 1,040 km^{2} (400 sq mi) of non-exclusive traditional territory with other First Nations of Canada.

In March 2013 the Snuneymuxw First Nation received an additional 877 hectares of land, consisting of three parcels in the Mount Benson area, as part of a reconciliation agreement with the government. Ida Chong, B.C. aboriginal relations and reconciliation minister, announced at the Vancouver Island Conference Centre that the land was "intended to provide forestry-related economic opportunities to generate revenue and employment" for the SFN.

According to the AANRC Profiles, the Snuneymuxw First Nation, band number 648 had six very small reserves as of 2012. Before the March 2013 reconciliation addition, the Snuneymuxw total reserve land base had consisted of 266 hectares, with the community historically divided into four small, numbered reserves on the shores of Nanaimo Harbour and Nanaimo River, and two tiny reserves at Gabriola Island. On a per capita basis, the Snuneymuxw land base was the smallest reserve land base in British Columbia. In January 2013, two reserves at Nanaimo River were amalgamated into the third, and are now part of what is called the Nanaimo River Reserve. (See further information below.)

The small size and odd shapes and locations of these reserves are visible on the interactive map provided by Aboriginal Affairs and Northern Development Canada. Reserve 1, consisting of several city blocks, is between a railroad track and the main highway that goes through Nanaimo.

Three reserves were along the Nanaimo River: Reserve 2 on the east bank, and Reserves 3 and 4 on the west bank. The river and river banks are not reserve land. All three of these parcels are on the estuary and appear to be in a flood zone. These small reserves are bounded by the main Island Highway, Duke Point Highway and Cedar Road. Although surrounded by the city of Nanaimo, they were not fully provided with water and sewage infrastructure, which resulted in underdevelopment of this area.

1. Nanaimo town 1, also known as Reserve No. 1, (AANRC number 06815) is located in the Nanaimo District on Nanaimo Harbour adjacent to the city of Nanaimo and consists of 22.40 hectares (55.4 acres). There were 337 residents in 2011.
2. Nanaimo River 2, also known as Reserve No. 2 (AANRC number 06816), is located in the Cranberry District on the left bank of the Nanaimo River near its mouth and consists of 53.80 hectares (132.9 acres). There were 26 residents in 2011. It has been dissolved and amalgamated with Nanaimo River Reserve.
3. Nanaimo River 3, also known as Reserve No. 3 (AANRC number 06817), is located in the Cranberry District, point of Section 21, Range 1, and Sections 19 and 21 Range 7, near the mouth of the Nanaimo River, and consists of 108.30 hectares (267.6 acres). Statistics Canada provides a precise map. There were 81 residents in 2011. It has been dissolved and amalgamated with Nanaimo River Reserve.
4. Nanaimo River 4, also known as Reserve No. 4 (AANRC number 06818), is located in the Cranberry District, Sections 18 and 19, Range 8, 4 miles southwest of Nanaimo, on the east coast of Vancouver Island, and consists of 80.10 hectares (197.9 acres).

As of January 2013, Nanaimo River Reserve, with 287 residents, was listed as having undergone an amalgamation, absorbing Nanaimo River 2 and Nanaimo River 3, which were dissolved as separate reserves.

1. Gabriola Island 5 reserve (AANRC number 06819) is located in Nanaimo District, Section 1, on the west point at mouth of Degnen Bay, south of Gabriola Island and consists of 1 hectare (2.5 acres).
2. Ma-guala 6 (AANRC number 06820) is located in Nanaimo District. It is a small island in Degnen Bay on the south shore of Gabriola island and consists of 0.40 hectares (0.99 acres).

== Governance ==
Snuneymuxw First Nation is governed by an elected Chief and Council. On 2 December 2017, Michael James Wyse Sr. (Xum'silum) was elected chief of Snuneymuxw First Nation defeating incumbent Chief John Gordon (Gord) Wesley by 310 votes to 210 votes. Previously, on 7 December 2013, Chief John Gordon (Gord) Wesley was elected with 253 votes out of 499. Five Councillors were also elected for up to a four-year term. Elections are carried out in accordance with the Snuneymuxw First Nation Election Code (2007) & Regulations (2011).

== Demographics ==
The Snuneymuxw First Nation number is 648. The band's population is 1,973, and 70 percent of Snuneymuxw people live off-reserve.

== Treaty rights ==
According to their official website, the SFN "are one of the few First Nations in BC that has a pre-confederation treaty with the Crown." The Snuneymuxw have treaty rights pursuant to the Treaty of 1854, one of the Douglas Treaties. This was confirmed by the landmark R. v. White and Bob litigation of the early to mid-1960s, wherein the treaty was confirmed and enforced. Provincial jurisdiction was ousted.

In October 2012, Chief Doug White met with UN Special Rapporteur James Anaya. Chief White argued that the Canadian federal government "has consistently failed to honour the Treaty of 1854" and has repeatedly broken the Treaty of 1854 during land negotiations. Anaya observed that "based on his preliminary findings", treaty and aboriginal claims remain "persistently unresolved" throughout Canada". He noted that there is a heightened level of mistrust distrust "among aboriginal peoples toward government at both the federal and provincial levels."

In 1992, the Snuneymuxw First Nation filed the Thlap’qwum Specific Claim related to the loss of their 32-hectare reserve in downtown Nanaimo, saying that it was illegally taken by the crown in the 1880s. The claim was accepted by the Crown as valid in 2003. After negotiations, the two sides agreed to a settlement offer worth $49,148,121. In November 2016, the First Nation ratified a settlement agreement for the land. The nearly $50 million payment is the largest specific claim negotiated by a British Columbia first nation by a factor of 5. As part of the agreement, the nation can negotiate for an additional 32-hectare of land to be added to their reserve.

== Social and economic development ==
=== Water and Sewage Infrastructure ===
In 1992 groundwater contamination was found and the wells were closed on the Snuneymuxw First Nation Indian Reserve No. 2. For twenty years the community used water trucks to bring water to the community. In 2010 the city of Nanaimo announced plans for a new water treatment facility but had difficulty acquiring Crown land needed for the project. John Ruttan, Nanaimo Mayor acknowledged that without the assistance of Snuneymuxw First Nation Chief Doug White III in acquiring some Crown land, "it’s questionable whether we would have been able to achieve what we’ve done." The City of Nanaimo agreed to provide the water to Reserve 2 as part of "the overall agreement." The Snuneymuxw First Nation are paying $500,000 cost of the project. The new water infrastructure project will connect Reserve No. 2 to Nanaimo's water supply lines at 1125 Cedar Road to provide potable water.

I want everyone to know what this means to our people, what it means to me as the chief of the Snuneymuxw First Nation, the work of my council over so many years, to address what is a really critical need for our people for safe drinking water – for an effective, efficient supply of water... White said one reason so much of the reserve remains undeveloped is due to a lack of water and sewage infrastructure.

— Doug White III, Snuneymuxw First Nation Chief in Bush 2012

The city and First Nation established an innovative mentoring program to expand the benefits of the new water system. In November 2012 SFN workers began job shadowing City of Nanaimo CUPE Local 401 water crews members to learn foundational skills in maintaining quality water systems. CUPE's long-term goal is to expand this pilot project to First Nations communities across Vancouver Island. According to Blaine Gurrie, CUPE Local 401 President and member of the Vancouver Island Water Watch Coalition, CUPE is working to assist SFN employees in the following ways:

become familiar with the hands on day-to-day work involved in a municipality's regular water distribution maintenance programs including emergency repairs and the installation various components... With this model, First Nations communities can supply safe clean water in areas where they have been given the responsibility, but no other assistance from government other than funding.... We have proven by example this expertise can be imparted to manage public water systems, without the need for a private partner... CETA and Bill S-8 combined could prevent First Nations from building, owning and operating their own water and wastewater plants.... By not delivering the education to make their legislation work, the Federal government is opening the door wider to further water privatization.

— CUPE, 2013

=== Casino acquisitions ===
In December 2025, it was announced that the Snuneymuxw First Nation, through its wholly owned subsidiary Petroglyph Development Group, had entered into a definitive agreement to acquire Great Canadian Casino Vancouver in Coquitlam, British Columbia. The agreement represented the Nation’s fifth casino acquisition in the province within the 2024–2025 period, following earlier transactions involving other gaming properties.

== Justice system ==
Like other First Nations, the Snuneymuxw had a community system to regulate behavior based on restorative justice. They think it has elements that should be revived, for the sake of their people and culture.

I’d like to see our system come back. For the sake of our children, that has to come back. And we’ll be proud again like our ancestors, we helped one another, they respected one another. Our culture, our laws were still here when I was a kid and we were happy people. We have to work together. Same as our justice. The whole community’s got to work together before it’ll ever work... The Hereditary Chief was the leader and they had their own laws and justice. And when the white man came here they took them laws out. When you see people go wrong, our people had Elders that would heal that person and the white man way is punishing. They put him in jail. How did they come out? They come out a better criminal when they do come out of jail. And our way’s different, we heal people that go wrong.

— Snuneymuxw Elder Bill Seward, Carey

In 2006 226 First Nations members were imprisoned in the Nanaimo Correctional Centre (NCC), a provincial prison on SFN traditional territory. That represented 21.2% of the prison population. In British Columbia the percentage of indigenous prisoners was 20% in 2004–5.
