= List of provincial parks in British Columbia =

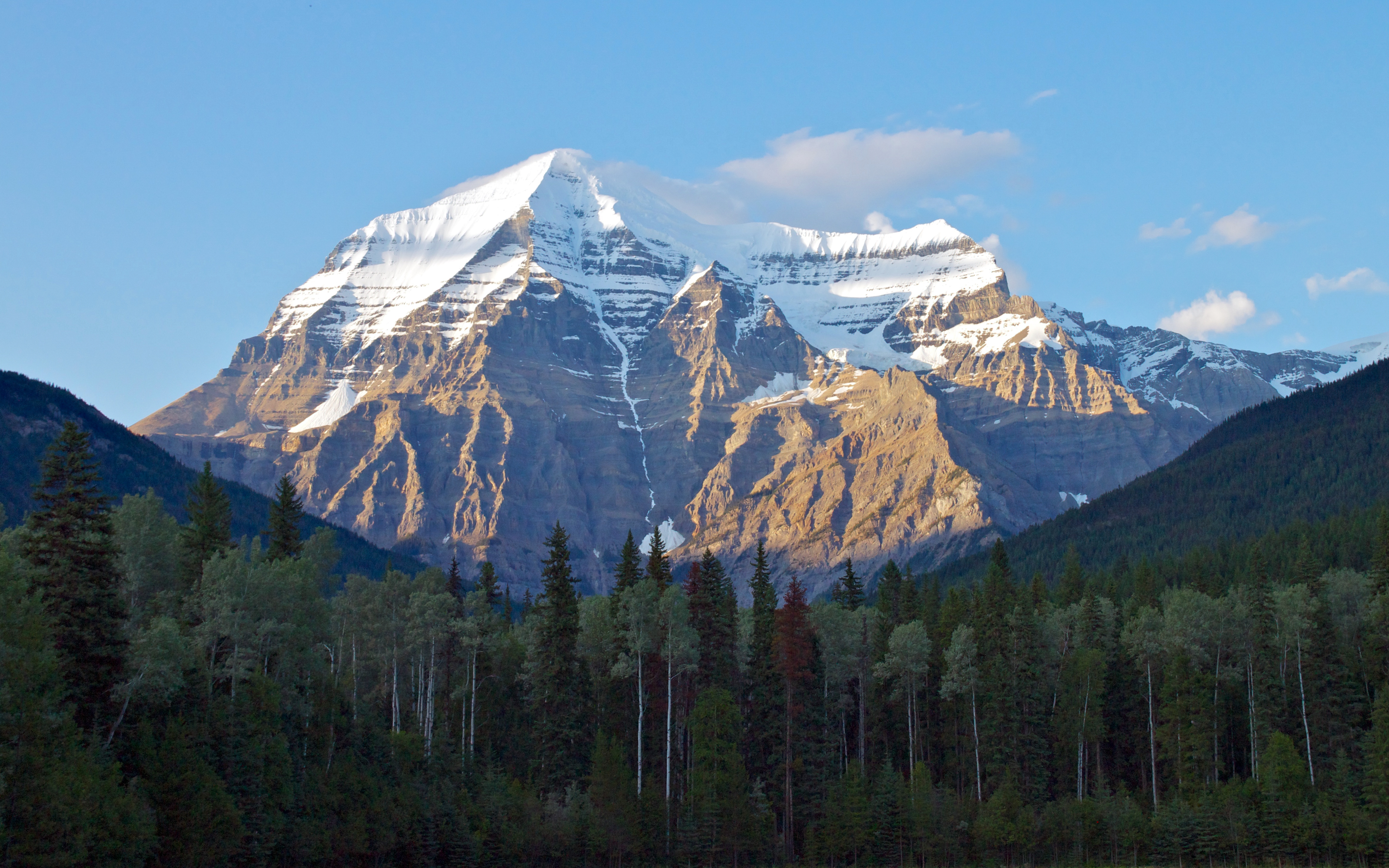
British Columbia Parks and Protected Areas System
Mount Robson Provincial Park
Statistics (June 2025)
Designation	Number	Area (ha)
Class A Parks	628	10,717,866
Class B Parks	2	3,778
Class C Parks	13	484
Conservancies	169	3,143,935
Ecological Reserves	148	160,418
Protected Areas	86	387,064
Recreation Areas	2	5,929
Total	1,048	14,419,474

The British Columbia Parks and Protected Areas System is the collection of physical properties owned or administered by BC Parks, an agency of the British Columbia Ministry of Environment and Climate Change Strategy. These protected areas are established by order-in-council under one of several different pieces of enabling legislation.

The system includes 644 provincial parks, two recreation areas, 156 conservancies, 84 protected areas, and 148 ecological reserves. Four provincial parks are designated UNESCO World Heritage Sites, while 24 provincial parks are designated UNESCO Biosphere Reserves.

== Provincial parks by regional district ==
The following articles list provincial parks of British Columbia by regional district.

- Alberni-Clayoquot
- Bulkley-Nechako
- Capital
- Cariboo
- Central Coast
- Central Kootenay
- Central Okanagan
- Columbia-Shuswap
- Comox Valley
- Cowichan Valley
- East Kootenay
- Fraser-Fort George
- Fraser Valley
- Kitimat-Stikine
- Kootenay Boundary
- Metro Vancouver
- Mount Waddington
- Nanaimo
- North Coast
- North Okanagan
- Northern Rockies
- Okanagan-Similkameen
- Peace River
- qathet
- Squamish-Lillooet
- Stikine Region
- Strathcona
- Sunshine Coast
- Thompson-Nicola

== List of provincial parks and protected areas ==
Please refer to the BC Parks website for lists of parks/protected areas and ecological reserves.

* UNESCO World Heritage Site
† UNESCO Biosphere Reserve

Park name	Type (Note: PP = Class A Provincial Park; PP* = Class B/C Provincial Park; RA = Recreation Area; C = Conservancy; PA = Protected Areas; ER = Ecological Reserve)	Regional District	Area		Established (Note: Year first established by order-in-council or by legislation; does not indicate designation changes or expansions.)	Location (drainage basin)
Park name	Type	Regional District	ha	acres	Established	Location (drainage basin)
Adams Lake Provincial Park	PP	Columbia-Shuswap	262	650	1996	North central (Fraser River–Thompson River)
Akamina-Kishinena Provincial Park	PP	East Kootenay	10,921	26,990	1995	Southeast (Columbia River–Kootenay River)
Alexandra Bridge Provincial Park	PP	Fraser Valley	51	130	1984	Southwest (Fraser River)
Aleza Lake Ecological Reserve	ER	Fraser-Fort George	269	660	1978	North central (Fraser River headwaters)
Alice Lake Provincial Park	PP	Squamish-Lillooet	411	1,020	1956	Southwest (South coast)
Allison Harbour Marine Provincial Park	PP	Mount Waddington	132	330	2008	Southwest (South coast)
Allison Lake Provincial Park	PP	Okanagan-Similkameen	21	52	1960	Southeast (Columbia River–Okanagan River)
Alty Conservancy	C	North Coast	8,463	20,910	2007	Northwest (North coast)
Ambrose Lake Ecological Reserve	ER	Sunshine Coast	295	730	1971	Southwest (South coast)
Anarchist Protected Area	PA	Okanagan-Similkameen	467	1,150	2001	Southeast (Columbia River–Okanagan River)
Ancient Forest/Chun T'oh Whudujut Provincial Park and Protected Area	PP, PA	Fraser-Fort George	11,875	29,340	2016	North central (Fraser River headwaters)
Anderson Bay Provincial Park	PP	qathet	35	86	2000	Vancouver Island (Texada–Lasqueti Islands)
Anderson Flats Provincial Park	PP	Kitimat-Stikine	99	240	2007	Northwest (Skeena River)
Anhluut'ukwsim Lax̱mihl Angwinga'asanskwhl Nisg̱a'a (Nisga'a Memorial Lava Bed Park)	PP	Kitimat-Stikine	17,717	43,780	1992	Northwest (Nass River)
Anne Vallee Ecological Reserve	ER	Mount Waddington	1,980	4,900	1971	Vancouver Island
Anstey-Hunakwa Provincial Park	PP, PA	Columbia-Shuswap	6,852	16,930	2001	North central (Fraser River–Thompson River)
Apodaca Provincial Park	PP	Metro Vancouver	12	30	1954	Southwest (South coast)
Arbutus Grove Provincial Park †	PP	Nanaimo	22	54	1966	Vancouver Island
Arctic Pacific Lakes Provincial Park	PP	Fraser-Fort George	13,887	34,320	2000	North central (Fraser River headwaters, Peace River)
Arrow Lakes Provincial Park	PP	Columbia-Shuswap	93	230	1981	Southeast (Columbia River)
Arrowstone Provincial Park	PP	Thompson-Nicola	6,153	15,200	1996	North central (Fraser River–Thompson River)
Artlish Caves Provincial Park	PP	Alberni-Clayoquot	285	700	1996	Vancouver Island
Atlin/Áa Tlein Téix'i Provincial Park	PP	Stikine	229,894	568,080	1973	Northwest (Yukon River, Taku River)
Atna River Provincial Park	PP	Bulkley-Nechako	21,092	52,120	2008	Northwest (Skeena River)
Babine Lake Marine Provincial Park	PP	Bulkley-Nechako	492	1,220	1993	Northwest (Skeena River)
Babine Mountains Provincial Park	PP	Bulkley-Nechako, Kitimat-Stikine	31,146	76,960	1984	Northwest (Skeena River)
Babine River Corridor Provincial Park	PP	Bulkley-Nechako	15,359	37,950	1999	Northwest (Skeena River)
Baeria Rocks Ecological Reserve	ER	Alberni-Clayoquot	140	350	1971	Vancouver Island
Ballingall Islets Ecological Reserve	ER	Capital	0.2	0.49	1963	Vancouver Island (Gulf Islands)
Bamberton Provincial Park	PP	Cowichan Valley	27	67	1960	Vancouver Island
Banana Island Provincial Park	PP	Thompson-Nicola	6	15	1996	North central (Fraser River–Thompson River)
Banks Nii Łuutiksm Conservancy	C	North Coast	19,121	47,250	2006	Northwest (North coast)
Baynes Island Ecological Reserve	ER	Squamish-Lillooet	71	180	1975	Southwest (South coast)
Bear Creek Provincial Park	PP	Central Okanagan	158	390	1981	Southeast (Columbia River–Okanagan River)
Bear Glacier Provincial Park	PP	Kitimat-Stikine	542	1,340	2000	Northwest (Nass River)
Bear Island Conservancy	C	Bulkley-Nechako	317	780	2008	Northwest (Skeena River)
Bearhole Lake Provincial Park and Protected Area	PP, PA	Peace River	17,460	43,100	2001	Northeast (Peace River)
Beatton Provincial Park	PP	Peace River	330	820	1934	Northeast (Peace River)
Beatton River Provincial Park	PP	Peace River	185	460	2000	Northeast (Peace River)
Beaumont Provincial Park	PP	Bulkley-Nechako	178	440	1960	North central (Fraser River–Nechako River)
Beaver Creek Provincial Park	PP*	Kootenay Boundary	89	220	1965	Southeast (Columbia River)
Beaver Point Provincial Park	PP	Capital	16	40	1949	Vancouver Island (Gulf Islands)
Beaver Valley Provincial Park	PP	Cariboo	767	1,900	2013	North central (Fraser River–Quesnel River)
Becher's Prairie Provincial Park	PP	Cariboo	125	310	2013	North central (Fraser River)
Bedard Aspen Provincial Park	PP	Thompson-Nicola	182	450	1996	North central (Fraser River–Thompson River)
Bednesti Lake Ecological Reserve	ER	Bulkley-Nechako	140	350	1978	North central (Fraser River–Nechako River)
Bella Coola Estuary Conservancy	C	Central Coast	269	660	2008	North central (Central Coast)
Bellhouse Provincial Park	PP	Capital	2.5	6.2	1964	Vancouver Island (Gulf Islands)
Beresford Island Ecological Reserve	ER	Mount Waddington	425	1,050	1971	Vancouver Island
Big Bar Lake Provincial Park	PP	Thompson-Nicola	368	910	1969	North central (Fraser River)
Big Basin Provincial Park	PP	Cariboo	998	2,470	2013	North central (Fraser River)
Big Bunsby Marine Provincial Park	PP	Strathcona	619	1,530	1996	Vancouver Island
Big Creek Ecological Reserve	ER	Cariboo	256	630	1990	North central (Fraser River–Chilcotin River)
Big Creek Provincial Park	PP	Cariboo	67,918	167,830	1995	North central (Fraser River–Chilcotin River)
Big White Mountain Ecological Reserve	ER	Kootenay Boundary	951	2,350	1972	Southeast (Columbia River–Kettle River)
Bijoux Falls Provincial Park	PP	Fraser-Fort George	30	74	1956	Northeast (Peace River)
Birkenhead Lake Provincial Park	PP	Squamish-Lillooet	10,439	25,800	1963	Southwest (Fraser River–Lillooet River)
Bishop Bay-Monkey Beach Conservancy	C	Kitimat-Stikine	3,374	8,340	2006	Northwest (North coast)
Bishop Bay-Monkey Beach Corridor Conservancy	C	Kitimat-Stikine	13	32	2007	Northwest (North coast)
Bishop River Provincial Park	PP	Strathcona	19,947	49,290	1997	Southwest (South Coast)
Blackcomb Glacier Provincial Park	PP	Squamish-Lillooet	250	620	1990	Southwest (Fraser River–Lillooet River)
Blackwater Creek Ecological Reserve	ER	Fraser-Fort George	292	720	1975	Northeast (Peace River)
Blanket Creek Provincial Park	PP	Columbia-Shuswap	318	790	1982	Southeast (Columbia River)
Bligh Island Marine Provincial Park	PP	Strathcona	4,455	11,010	1995	Vancouver Island
Blue Earth Lake Provincial Park	PP	Thompson-Nicola	689	1,700	1996	North central (Fraser River–Thompson River)
Blue River Black Spruce Provincial Park	PP	Thompson-Nicola	172	430	1996	North central (Fraser River–Thompson River)
Blue River Pine Provincial Park	PP	Thompson-Nicola	28	69	1996	North central (Fraser River–Thompson River)
Blue/Dease Rivers Ecological Reserve	ER		965	2,380	1975	
Bobtail Mountain Provincial Park	PP	Fraser-Fort George	1,360	3,400	2000	North central (Fraser River–Nechako River)
Bocock Peak Provincial Park	PP	Peace River	1,142	2,820	2000	Northeast (Peace River)
Bodega Ridge Provincial Park	PP	Capital	397	980	2001	Vancouver Island (Gulf Islands)
Bonaparte Provincial Park	PP	Thompson-Nicola	11,833	29,240	2004	North central (Fraser River–Thompson River)
Boothman's Oxbow Provincial Park	PP	Kootenay Boundary	43	110	2007	Southeast (Columbia River–Kettle River)
Border Lake Provincial Park	PP	Kitimat-Stikine	814	2,010	2001	Northwest (North coast)
Boulder Creek Provincial Park	PP	Kitimat-Stikine	53	130	2000	Northwest (Skeena River)
Boundary Creek Provincial Park	PP	Kootenay Boundary	2	4.9	1956	Southeast (Columbia River–Kettle River)
Bowen Island Ecological Reserve	ER	Metro Vancouver	399	990	1973	Southwest (South coast)
Bowron Lake Provincial Park	PP	Cariboo	139,700	345,000	1961	North central (Fraser River–Quesnel River, Fraser River headwaters)
Bowser Ecological Reserve	ER	Comox Valley, Nanaimo	113	280	1996	Vancouver Island
Boyle Point Provincial Park and Protected Area	PP, PA	Comox Valley	188	460	1989	Vancouver Island (Denman–Hornby Islands)
Brackendale Eagles Provincial Park	PP	Squamish-Lillooet	765	1,890	1999	Southwest (South coast)
Brandywine Falls Provincial Park	PP	Squamish-Lillooet	420	1,000	1973	Southwest (South coast)
Brent Mountain Protected Area	PA	Okanagan-Similkameen	4,344	10,730	2001	Southeast (Columbia River–Okanagan River)
Bridal Veil Falls Provincial Park	PP	Fraser Valley	33	82	1965	Southwest (Fraser River)
Bridge Lake Provincial Park	PP	Cariboo	405	1,000	1956	North central (Fraser River–Thompson River)
Bridge River Delta Provincial Park	PP	Squamish-Lillooet	992	2,450	2010	North central (Fraser River)
Brim River Hot Springs Protected Area	PA	Kitimat-Stikine	202	500	2005	Northwest (North coast)
Bromley Rock Provincial Park	PP	Okanagan-Similkameen	154	380	1956	Southeast (Columbia River–Okanagan River)
Browne Lake Ecological Reserve	ER	Central Okanagan	114	280	1973	Southeast (Columbia River–Okanagan River)
Browne Lake Provincial Park	PP	Central Okanagan	47	120	2004	Southeast (Columbia River–Okanagan River)
Broughton Archipelago Provincial Park	PP	Mount Waddington	11,751	29,040	1992	Southwest (South coast)
Broughton Archipelago Conservancy	C	Mount Waddington	4,111	10,160	2009	Southwest (South coast)
Buccaneer Bay Provincial Park	PP	Sunshine Coast	45	110	1989	Southwest (South coast)
Buck Hills Road Ecological Reserve	ER	North Okanagan	16	40	1971	North central (Fraser River–Thompson River)
Buckinghorse River Wayside Provincial Park	PP	Peace River	55	140	1970	Northeast (Liard River)
Bugaboo Provincial Park	PP	East Kootenay	13,646	33,720	1969	Southeast (Columbia River)
Bulkley Junction Provincial Park	PP	Kitimat-Stikine	169	420	1997	Northwest (Skeena River)
Bull Canyon Provincial Park	PP	Cariboo	343	850	1955	North central (Fraser River–Chilcotin River)
Burdwood Group Conservancy	C	Mount Waddington	121	300	2009	Southwest (South coast)
Burges James Gadsden Provincial Park	PP	Columbia-Shuswap	404	1,000	1965	Southeast (Columbia River)
Burgoyne Bay Provincial Park	PP	Capital	524	1,290	2004	Vancouver Island (Gulf Islands)
Burnie-Shea Provincial Park	PP	Bulkley-Nechako, Kitimat-Stikine	34,536	85,340	2008	Northwest (Skeena River)
Burns Lake Provincial Park	PP	Bulkley-Nechako	65	160	2001	North central (Fraser River–Nechako River)
Burnt Bridge Creek Conservancy	C	Central Coast	1,691	4,180	2008	North central (Central Coast)
Burnt Cabin Bog Ecological Reserve	ER	Bulkley-Nechako	670	1,700	2000	Northwest (Skeena River)
Buse Lake Protected Area	PA	Thompson-Nicola	228	560	2000	North central (Fraser River–Thompson River)
Butler Ridge Provincial Park	PP	Peace River	6,024	14,890	2000	Northeast (Peace River)
Byers/Conroy/Harvey/Sinnett Islands Ecological Reserve	ER	Kitimat-Stikine	11,923	29,460	1981	North central (Central Coast)
Caligata Lake Provincial Park	PP	Thompson-Nicola	153	380	1996	North central (Fraser River–Thompson River)
Call Lake Provincial Park	PP	Bulkley-Nechako	60	150	1999	Northwest (Skeena River)
Callaghan Conservancy	C	Squamish-Lillooet	8,081	19,970	2008	Southwest (South coast)
Callaghan Lake Provincial Park	PP	Squamish-Lillooet	2,691	6,650	1997	Southwest (South coast, Fraser River–Lillooet River)
Calvert Island Conservancy	C	Central Coast	18,558	45,860	2006	North central (Central Coast)
Campbell Brown (Kalamalka Lake) Ecological Reserve	ER	Central Okanagan, North Okanagan	104	260	1977	Southeast (Columbia River–Okanagan River)
Canim Beach Provincial Park	PP	Cariboo	8.2	20	1956	North central (Fraser River–Thompson River)
Canoe Islets Ecological Reserve	ER	Cowichan Valley	0.6	1.5	1971	Vancouver Island (Gulf Islands)
Cape Scott Provincial Park	PP	Mount Waddington	22,295	55,090	1973	Vancouver Island
Cariboo Mountains Provincial Park	PP	Cariboo	113,470	280,400	1995	North central (Fraser River–Quesnel River)
Cariboo Nature Provincial Park	PP	Cariboo	89	220	1965	North central (Fraser River)
Cariboo River Provincial Park	PP	Cariboo	3,211	7,930	1984	North central (Fraser River–Quesnel River)
Carmanah Walbran Provincial Park	PP	Cowichan Valley	16,365	40,440	1991	Vancouver Island
Carp Lake Provincial Park	PP	Fraser-Fort George	38,149	94,270	1973	Northeast (Peace River, Fraser River headwaters)
Carter Bay Conservancy	C	Kitimat-Stikine	462	1,140	2007	North central (Central Coast)
Cascade-Sutslem Conservancy	C	Central Coast	121,482	300,190	2006	North central (Central Coast)
Castle Rock Hoodoos Provincial Park	PP	Thompson-Nicola	16	40	1997	North central (Fraser River–Thompson River)
Catala Island Marine Provincial Park	PP	Strathcona	955	2,360	1995	Vancouver Island
Cathedral Provincial Park and Protected Area	PP, PA	Okanagan-Similkameen	33,430	82,600	1968	Southeast (Columbia River–Okanagan River)
Catherine Creek Ecological Reserve	ER	Kitimat-Stikine	45	110	2000	Northwest (Skeena River)
Catto Creek Conservancy	C	Mount Waddington	7,249	17,910	2008	Southwest (South coast)
Cecil Lake Ecological Reserve	ER	Peace River	130	320	1973	Northeast (Peace River)
Cedar Point Provincial Park	PP*	Cariboo	8	20	1962	North central (Fraser River–Quesnel River)
Cetan/Thurston Bay Conservancy	C	Strathcona	230	570	2007	Vancouver Island (Discovery Islands)
Champion Lakes Provincial Park	PP	Central Kootenay, Kootenay Boundary	1,452	3,590	1955	Southeast (Columbia River)
Charlie Cole Creek Ecological Reserve	ER	Stikine	199	490	1981	Northwest (Yukon River)
Charlie Lake Provincial Park	PP	Peace River	176	430	1964	Northeast (Peace River)
Chase Provincial Park	PP	Peace River	36,226	89,520	2001	Northeast (Peace River)
Chasm Ecological Reserve	ER	Thompson-Nicola	197	490	1975	North central (Fraser River–Thompson River)
Chasm Provincial Park	PP	Thompson-Nicola	3,145	7,770	1940	North central (Fraser River–Thompson River)
Checleset Bay Ecological Reserve	ER	Strathcona	33,389	82,510	1981	Vancouver Island
Chemainus River Provincial Park	PP	Cowichan Valley	119	290	1959	Vancouver Island
Chickens Neck Mountain Ecological Reserve	ER	Kitimat-Stikine	680	1,700	1975	
Chilako River Ecological Reserve	ER	Bulkley-Nechako	66	160	1977	North central (Fraser River–Nechako River)
Chilliwack River Ecological Reserve	ER	Fraser Valley	86	210	1980	Southwest (Fraser River)
Chilliwack River Provincial Park	PP	Fraser Valley	23	57	1961	Southwest (Fraser River)
Choquette Hot Springs Provincial Park	PP	Kitimat-Stikine	52	130	2001	Northwest (Stikine River)
Christina Lake Provincial Park	PP	Kootenay Boundary	6	15	1971	Southeast (Columbia River–Kettle River)
Chu Chua Cottonwood Provincial Park	PP	Thompson-Nicola	108	270	1996	North central (Fraser River–Thompson River)
Chukachida Protected Area	PA	Stikine	19,637	48,520	2001	Northwest (Stikine River)
Chunamon Creek Ecological Reserve	ER	Peace River	344	850	1981	Northeast (Peace River)
Churn Creek Protected Area	PA	Cariboo, Thompson-Nicola	36,747	90,800	1995	North central (Fraser River)
Cinema Bog Ecological Reserve	ER	Cariboo	72	180	1977	North central (Fraser River)
Č̓icy̓i Conservancy	C	Alberni-Clayoquot	9,269	22,900	2024	Vancouver Island
Cinnemousun Narrows Provincial Park	PP	Columbia-Shuswap	738	1,820	1956	North central (Fraser River–Thompson River)
Clanninick Creek Ecological Reserve	ER	Strathcona	60	150	1976	Vancouver Island
Claud Elliott Creek Ecological Reserve	ER	Mount Waddington	233	580	1989	Vancouver Island
Claud Elliott Lake Provincial Park	PP	Mount Waddington	328	810	1995	Vancouver Island
Clayhurst Ecological Reserve	ER	Peace River	400	990	1971	Northeast (Peace River)
Clayoquot Arm Provincial Park †	PP	Alberni-Clayoquot	3,491	8,630	1995	Vancouver Island
Clayoquot Plateau Provincial Park †	PP	Alberni-Clayoquot	3,132	7,740	1995	Vancouver Island
Clayton Falls Conservancy	C	Central Coast	5,047	12,470	2008	North central (Central Coast)
Cleland Island Ecological Reserve †	ER	Alberni-Clayoquot	7	17	1971	Vancouver Island
Clendinning Provincial Park	PP	Squamish-Lillooet, qathet	30,330	74,900	1996	Southwest (South coast)
Close-To-The-Edge Provincial Park and Protected Area	PP, PA	Fraser-Fort George	702	1,730	2000	North central (Fraser River headwaters)
Clyak Estuary Conservancy	C	Central Coast	356	880	2007	North central (Central Coast)
Codville Lagoon Conservancy	C	Central Coast	1,218	3,010	2008	North central (Central Coast)
Codville Lagoon Marine Provincial Park	PP	Central Coast	867	2,140	1992	North central (Central Coast)
Cody Caves Provincial Park	PP	Central Kootenay	49	120	1966	Southeast (Columbia River–Kootenay River)
Coldwater River Provincial Park	PP	Thompson-Nicola	69	170	1986	North central (Fraser River–Thompson River)
Collinson Point Provincial Park	PP	Capital	23.68	58.5	2004	Vancouver Island (Gulf Islands)
Columbia Lake Ecological Reserve	ER	East Kootenay	32	79	1971	Southeast (Columbia River)
Columbia Lake Provincial Park	PP	East Kootenay	290	720	1988	Southeast (Columbia River)
Comox Lake Bluffs Ecological Reserve	ER	Comox Valley	47	120	1996	Vancouver Island
Conkle Lake Provincial Park	PP	Kootenay Boundary	587	1,450	1973	Southeast (Columbia River–Kettle River)
Copeland Islands Marine Provincial Park	PP	qathet	423	1,050	1971	Vancouver Island (Discovery Islands)
Copper Johnny Provincial Park	PP	Thompson-Nicola	656	1,620	2013	North central (Fraser River)
Coquihalla Canyon Provincial Park	PP	Fraser Valley	159	390	1986	Southwest (Fraser River)
Coquihalla River Provincial Park	PP	Fraser Valley	103	250	1986	Southwest (Fraser River)
Coquihalla Summit Recreation Area	RA	Fraser Valley	5,750	14,200	1987	Southwest (Fraser River)
Cormorant Channel Marine Provincial Park	PP	Mount Waddington	775	1,920	1992	Vancouver Island
Cornwall Hills Provincial Park	PP	Thompson-Nicola	1,235	3,050	2004	North central (Fraser River–Thompson River)
Coste Rocks Provincial Park	PP	Kitimat-Stikine	29	72	2004	Northwest (North coast)
Cottonwood River Provincial Park	PP	Cariboo	66	160	1956	North central (Fraser River)
Cougar Canyon Ecological Reserve	ER	Central Okanagan, North Okanagan	553	1,370	1981	Southeast (Columbia River–Okanagan River)
Cowichan River Provincial Park	PP	Cowichan Valley	1,414	3,490	1995	Vancouver Island
Crab Lake Conservancy	C	Kitimat-Stikine	12,789	31,600	2006	Northwest (North coast)
Craig Headwaters Protected Area	PA	Kitimat-Stikine	7,101	17,550	2001	Northwest (Stikine River)
Cranstown Point Conservancy	C	Central Coast	95	230	2007	North central (Central Coast)
Crater Lake Provincial Park	PP	Thompson-Nicola	95	230	2013	North central (Fraser River–Thompson River)
Crooked River Provincial Park	PP	Fraser-Fort George	963	2,380	1965	Northeast (Peace River)
Crowsnest Provincial Park	PP	East Kootenay	46	110	1960	Southeast (Columbia River—Kootenay River)
Cultus Lake Provincial Park	PP	Fraser Valley	2,729	6,740	1948	Southwest (Fraser River)
Cummins Lakes Provincial Park and Protected Area	PP, PA	Columbia-Shuswap	21,988.5	54,335	1995	Southeast (Columbia River)
Cypress Provincial Park	PP	Metro Vancouver, Squamish-Lillooet	3,012	7,440	1975	Southwest (South coast)
Daawuuxusda Conservancy	C	North Coast	16,275	40,220	2008	Northwest (North coast–Haida Gwaii)
Dahl Lake Provincial Park	PP	Fraser-Fort George	1,583	3,910	1981	North central (Fraser River–Nechako River)
Dala-Kildala Rivers Estuaries Provincial Park	PP	Kitimat-Stikine	741	1,830	2004	Northwest (North coast)
Dall River Old Growth Provincial Park	PP	Stikine	642	1,590	1999	Northeast (Liard River)
Damaxyaa Heritage Site/Conservancy	C	North Coast	829	2,050	2008	Northwest (North coast–Haida Gwaii)
Damdochax Protected Area	PA	Stikine	8,129	20,090	2001	Northwest (Skeena River)
Dante's Inferno Provincial Park	PP	Cariboo	376	930	2013	North central (Fraser River–Chilcotin River)
Darke Lake Provincial Park	PP	Okanagan-Similkameen	1,470	3,600	1968	Southeast (Columbia River–Okanagan River)
Davis Lake Provincial Park	PP	Fraser Valley	192	470	1963	Southwest (Fraser River)
Dawley Passage Provincial Park †	PP	Alberni-Clayoquot	154	380	1995	Vancouver Island
Dead Man's Island Provincial Park	PP	Bulkley-Nechako	1	2.5	1933	North central (Fraser River–Nechako River)
Dean River Conservancy	C	Central Coast	56,096	138,620	2008	North central (Central Coast)
Dean River Corridor Conservancy	C	Central Coast	3,508	8,670	2008	North central (Central Coast)
Denetiah Provincial Park and Protected Area	PP, PA	Stikine	90,379	223,330	1999	Northeast (Liard River)
Denison-Bonneau Provincial Park	PP	North Okanagan	376	930	2008	North central (Fraser River–Thompson River)
Denman Island Park and Protected Area	PP, PA	Comox Valley	570.3	1,409	2013	Vancouver Island (Denman–Hornby Islands)
Desolation Sound Marine Provincial Park	PP	qathet	8,449	20,880	1973	Southwest (South coast)
Det San Ecological Reserve	ER	Bulkley-Nechako	5.8	14	2009	Northwest (Skeena River)
Dewdney and Glide Islands Ecological Reserve	ER	Kitimat-Stikine	3,696	9,130	1971	Northwest (North coast)
Diana Lake Provincial Park	PP	North Coast	233	580	1980	Northwest (North coast)
Dionisio Point Provincial Park	PP	Capital	141	350	1991	Vancouver Island (Gulf Islands)
Discovery Island Marine Provincial Park	PP	Capital	67	170	1972	Vancouver Island (Gulf Islands)
Dixie Cove Marine Provincial Park	PP	Strathcona	164	410	1996	Vancouver Island
Doc English Bluff Ecological Reserve	ER	Cariboo	52	130	1981	North central (Fraser River)
Donnely Lake Provincial Park	PP	Cariboo	814	2,010	2013	North central (Fraser River–Thompson River)
Downing Provincial Park	PP	Squamish-Lillooet, Thompson-Nicola	139	340	1970	North central (Fraser River)
Dragon Mountain Provincial Park	PP	Cariboo	1,773	4,380	2013	North central (Fraser River, Fraser River–Quesnel River)
Drewry Point Provincial Park	PP	Central Kootenay	26	64	1970	Southeast (Columbia River–Kootenay River)
Driftwood Canyon Provincial Park	PP	Bulkley-Nechako	23	57	1967	Northwest (Skeena River)
Drizzle Lake Ecological Reserve	ER	North Coast	837	2,070	1973	Northwest (North coast–Haida Gwaii)
Drumbeg Provincial Park	PP	Nanaimo	56	140	1971	Vancouver Island (Gulf Islands)
Dry Gulch Provincial Park	PP	East Kootenay	29	72	1956	Southeast (Columbia River)
Drywilliam Lake Ecological Reserve	ER	Bulkley-Nechako	94	230	1975	North central (Fraser River–Nechako River)
Duck Lake Protected Area	PA	Qathet	768	1,900	2001	Southwest (South coast)
Duffey Lake Provincial Park	PP	Squamish-Lillooet	4,048	10,000	1993	North central (Fraser River)
Duke of Edinburgh Ecological Reserve	ER	Mount Waddington	660	1,600	1988	North central (Central Coast)
Dune Za Keyih Provincial Park and Protected Area	PP, PA	Stikine	346,833	857,040	2001	Northeast (Liard River)
Dunn Peak Provincial Park	PA	Thompson-Nicola	19,547	48,300	1996	North central (Fraser River–Thompson River)
Duu Guusd Heritage Site/Conservancy	C	North Coast	227,712	562,690	2008	Northwest (North coast–Haida Gwaii)
Dzawadi/Klinaklini Estuary Conservancy	C	Mount Waddington	808	2,000	2007	Southwest (South coast)
Dzawadi/Upper Klinaklini River Conservancy	C	Cariboo, Mount Waddington	39,241	96,970	2008	Southwest (South coast)
Eagle Bay Provincial Park	PP	Kitimat-Stikine	262	650	2004	Northwest (North coast)
Eagle River Provincial Park	PP	Columbia-Shuswap	454	1,120	2008	North central (Fraser River–Thompson River)
Eakin Creek Canyon Provincial Park	PP	Thompson-Nicola	10	25	1996	North central (Fraser River–Thompson River)
Eakin Creek Floodplain Provincial Park	PP	Thompson-Nicola	123	300	1996	North central (Fraser River–Thompson River)
East Pine Provincial Park	PP	Peace River	14	35	1982	Northeast (Peace River)
East Redonda Island Ecological Reserve	ER	Strathcona	6,182	15,280	1971	Vancouver Island (Discovery Islands)
E. C. Manning Provincial Park	PP	Fraser Valley, Okanagan-Similkameen	83,671	206,760	1941	Southeast (Columbia River–Okanagan River, Skagit River)
Echo Bay Marine Provincial Park	PP	Mount Waddington	1.5	3.7	1971	Southwest (South coast)
Echo Lake Provincial Park	PP	North Okanagan	154	380	1956	North central (Fraser River–Thompson River)
Ecstall Headwaters Conservancy	C	Kitimat-Stikine, North Coast	13,109	32,390	2008	Northwest (Skeena River)
Ecstall-Sparkling Conservancy	C	North Coast	40,577	100,270	2008	Northwest (Skeena River)
Ecstall-Spoksuut Conservancy	C	North Coast	10,110	25,000	2008	Northwest (Skeena River)
Ed Bird-Estella Lakes Provincial Park	PP	Peace River	5,568	13,760	2001	Northeast (Peace River)
Edge Hills Provincial Park	PP	Squamish-Lillooet, Thompson-Nicola	11,850	29,300	1995	North central (Fraser River)
Ekwan Lake Protected Area	PA	Northern Rockies	1,892	4,680	2001	Northeast (Liard River)
Elephant Hill Provincial Park	PP	Thompson-Nicola	968	2,390	1996	North central (Fraser River–Thompson River)
Eleven Sisters Provincial Park	PP	Cariboo	3,052	7,540	2013	North central (Fraser River–Chilcotin River)
Elk Falls Provincial Park	PP, PA	Strathcona	1,071	2,650	1940	Vancouver Island
Elk Lakes Provincial Park	PP	East Kootenay	18,006	44,490	1973	Southeast (Columbia River–Kootenay River)
Elk Valley Provincial Park	PP	East Kootenay	81	200	1960	Southeast (Columbia River–Kootenay River)
Elko Provincial Park	PP*	East Kootenay	22	54	1958	Southeast (Columbia River–Kootenay River)
Ellerslie-Roscoe Conservancy	C	Central Coast	50,137	123,890	2008	North central (Central Coast)
Ellis Island Ecological Reserve	ER	Bulkley-Nechako	6.6	16	1991	North central (Fraser River–Nechako River)
Ellison Provincial Park	PP	North Okanagan	220	540	1962	Southeast (Columbia River–Okanagan River)
Emar Lakes Provincial Park	PP	Thompson-Nicola	1,618	4,000	1996	North central (Fraser River–Thompson River)
Emily Lake Conservancy	C	Central Coast	1,230	3,000	2007	North central (Central Coast)
Emory Creek Provincial Park	PP	Fraser Valley	29	72	1956	Southwest (Fraser River)
Enderby Cliffs Provincial Park	PP	North Okanagan	2,299	5,680	2006	North central (Fraser River–Thompson River)
Eneas Lakes Provincial Park	PP	Central Okanagan, Okanagan-Similkameen	1,036	2,560	1968	Southeast (Columbia River–Okanagan River)
English Lake Provincial Park	PP	Columbia-Shuswap	337	830	2004	North central (Fraser River–Thompson River)
Englishman River Falls Provincial Park †	PP	Nanaimo	97	240	1940	Vancouver Island
Entiako Provincial Park	PP	Bulkley-Nechako	126,023	311,410	1999	North central (Fraser River–Nechako River)
Epper Passage Provincial Park †	PP	Alberni-Clayoquot	328	810	1995	Vancouver Island
Epsom Provincial Park	PP	Thompson-Nicola	74	180	1997	North central (Fraser River–Thompson River)
Erg Mountain Provincial Park	PP	Fraser-Fort George	1,011	2,500	2000	North central (Fraser River headwaters)
Erie Creek Provincial Park	PP	Central Kootenay	15	37	1965	Southeast (Columbia River)
Eskers Provincial Park	PP	Fraser-Fort George	4,044	9,990	1987	North central (Fraser River–Nechako River)
Esté-tiwilh/Sigurd Creek Conservancy	C	Squamish-Lillooet	1,112	2,750	2008	Southwest (South coast)
Ethel F. Wilson Memorial Provincial Park	PP	Bulkley-Nechako	33	82	1953	Northwest (Skeena River)
Ethelda Bay - Tennant Island Conservancy	C	Kitimat-Stikine	61	150	2007	Northwest (North coast)
Europa Lake Conservancy	C	Kitimat-Stikine	8,940	22,100	2008	Northwest (North coast)
Evanoff Provincial Park	PP	Fraser-Fort George	1,473	3,640	2000	North central (Fraser River headwaters)
Evans Lake Ecological Reserve	ER	Central Kootenay	164	410	1972	Southeast (Columbia River–Kootenay River)
Eves Provincial Park	PP*	Cowichan Valley	18	44	1962	Vancouver Island
Exchamsiks River Provincial Park	PP	Kitimat-Stikine	20	49	1956	Northwest (Skeena River)
Ferry Island Provincial Park	PP*	Fraser Valley	29	72	1963	Southwest (Fraser River)
F.H. Barber Provincial Park	PP	Fraser Valley	8.5	21	1978	Southwest (Fraser River)
Field's Lease Ecological Reserve	ER	Okanagan-Similkameen	4.5	11	1972	Southeast (Columbia River–Okanagan River)
Fillongley Provincial Park	PP	Comox Valley	26	64	1954	Vancouver Island (Denman–Hornby Islands)
Finger-Tatuk Provincial Park	PP	Bulkley-Nechako	17,127	42,320	1999	North central (Fraser River–Nechako River)
Finlay-Russel Provincial Park and Protected Area	PP, PA	Peace River	121,771	300,900	2001	Northeast (Peace River)
Finn Creek Provincial Park	PP, PA	Thompson-Nicola	380	940	1996	North central (Fraser River–Thompson River)
Fintry Provincial Park and Protected Area	PP, PA	Central Okanagan	357	880	1996	Southeast (Columbia River–Okanagan River)
Fiordland Conservancy	C	Kitimat-Stikine	84,417	208,600	2006	North central (Central Coast)
Flat Lake Provincial Park	PP	Cariboo, Thompson-Nicola	4,275	10,560	1995	North central (Fraser River–Thompson River)
Flores Island Provincial Park †	PP	Alberni-Clayoquot	7,113	17,580	1995	Vancouver Island
Foch-Gilttoyees Provincial Park	PP, PA	Kitimat-Stikine	61,089	150,950	2004	Northwest (North coast)
Fort George Canyon Provincial Park	PP	Fraser-Fort George	178	440	2000	North central (Fraser River)
Fort Nelson River Ecological Reserve	ER	Northern Rockies	158	390	1975	Northeast (Liard River)
Forward Harbour/ƛ̓əx̌ʷəyəm Conservancy	C	Mount Waddington	306	760	2007	Southwest (South coast)
Fossli Provincial Park	PP	Alberni-Clayoquot	52	130	1974	Vancouver Island
Foster Arm Protected Area	PA	Fraser-Fort George	1,020	2,500	2001	Southeast (Columbia River)
Francis Point Ecological Reserve	ER	Sunshine Coast	17	42	2004	Southwest (South coast)
Francis Point Provincial Park	PP	Sunshine Coast	83	210	2004	Southwest (South coast)
François Lake Provincial Park	PP, PA	Bulkley-Nechako	7,214	17,830	1999	North central (Fraser River–Nechako River)
Fraser River Breaks Provincial Park	PP	Cariboo	883	2,180	2013	North central (Fraser River)
Fraser River Ecological Reserve	ER	Fraser Valley	177	440	1977	Southwest (Fraser River)
Fraser River Provincial Park	PP	Fraser-Fort George	4,899	12,110	2000	North central (Fraser River)
Fred Antoine Provincial Park	PP	Squamish-Lillooet	8,230	20,300	2010	North central (Fraser River)
French Bar Creek Provincial Park	PP	Thompson-Nicola	1,159	2,860	2010	North central (Fraser River)
French Beach Provincial Park	PP	Capital	55	140	1974	Vancouver Island
Gabriola Sands Provincial Park	PP	Nanaimo	6	15	1960	Vancouver Island (Gulf Islands)
Galiano Island Ecological Reserve	ER	Capital	25	62	1990	Vancouver Island (Gulf Islands)
Gamble Creek Ecological Reserve	ER	North Coast	969	2,390	1991	Northwest (Skeena River, North Coast)
Garden Bay Marine Provincial Park	PP	Sunshine Coast	163	400	1969	Southwest (South coast)
Garibaldi Provincial Park	PP	Fraser Valley, Squamish-Lillooet	188,661	466,190	1927	Southwest (South coast, Fraser River, Fraser River–Lillooet River)
Gerald Island Provincial Park †	PP	Nanaimo	12	30	2013	Vancouver Island (Gulf Islands)
Gibson Marine Provincial Park †	PP	Alberni-Clayoquot	143	350	1967	Vancouver Island
Gilnockie Creek Ecological Reserve	ER	East Kootenay	58	140	1981	Southeast (Columbia River–Kootenay River)
Gilnockie Provincial Park	PP	East Kootenay	2,842	7,020	1995	Southeast (Columbia River–Kootenay River)
Gilpin Grasslands Provincial Park	PP	Kootenay Boundary	912	2,250	2007	Southeast (Columbia River–Kettle River)
Gingietl Creek Ecological Reserve	ER	Kitimat-Stikine	2,873	7,100	1985	Northwest (Nass River)
Giscome Portage Trail Protected Area	PA	Fraser-Fort George	160	400	2001	North central (Fraser River headwaters)
Gitnadoiks River Provincial Park	PP	Kitimat-Stikine	57,698	142,570	1986	Northwest (Skeena River)
Gitxaala Nii Luutiksm/Kitkatla Conservancy	C	North Coast	29,539	72,990	2006	Northwest (North coast)
Gladstone Provincial Park	PP	Central Kootenay, Kootenay Boundary	39,387	97,330	1995	Southeast (Columbia River–Kettle River)
Gladys Lake Ecological Reserve	ER	Stikine	40,541	100,180	1975	Northwest (Stikine River)
Goat Cove Conservancy	C	Kitimat-Stikine	95	230	2007	North central (Central Coast)
Goat Range Provincial Park	PP	Central Kootenay	79,124	195,520	1995	Southeast (Columbia River–Kootenay River)
God's Pocket Marine Provincial Park	PP	Mount Waddington	2,036	5,030	1995	Vancouver Island
Goguka Creek Protected Area	PA	Northern Rockies	435	1,070	2001	Northeast (Liard River)
Gold Muchalat Provincial Park	PP	Strathcona	645	1,590	1996	Vancouver Island
Golden Ears Provincial Park	PP	Fraser Valley, Metro Vancouver	62,539	154,540	1967	Southwest (Fraser River)
Golden Gate/X̱áat Yádi Aani Conservancy	C	Stikine	5,981	14,780	2012	Northwest (Yukon River)
Goldpan Provincial Park	PP	Thompson-Nicola	5.6	14	1956	North central (Fraser River–Thompson River)
Goldstream Provincial Park	PP	Capital	477	1,180	1958	Vancouver Island
Goose Bay Conservancy	C	Central Coast	960	2,400	2007	North central (Central Coast)
Goosegrass Creek Ecological Reserve	ER	Columbia-Shuswap	2,699	6,670	1974	Southeast (Columbia River)
Gordon Bay Provincial Park	PP	Cowichan Valley	104	260	1969	Vancouver Island
Gowlland Tod Provincial Park	PP	Capital	1,280	3,200	1995	Vancouver Island
Graham-Laurier Provincial Park	PP	Peace River	99,982	247,060	1999	Northeast (Peace River)
Granby Provincial Park	PP	Central Kootenay, Kootenay Boundary, North Okanagan	41,156	101,700	1995	Southeast (Columbia River–Kettle River)
Grayling River Hot Springs Ecological Reserve	ER	Northern Rockies	1,421	3,510	2000	Northeast (Liard River)
Graystokes Protected Area	PP	Central Okanagan, North Okanagan	11,958	29,550	2001	Southeast (Columbia River–Okanagan River, Columbia River–Kettle River, Fraser River–Thompson River)
Great Glacier Provincial Park	PP	Kitimat-Stikine	9,313	23,010	2001	Northwest (Stikine River)
Green Inlet Marine Provincial Park	PP	Kitimat-Stikine	36.5	90	1992	North central (Central Coast)
Green Lake Provincial Park	PP	Cariboo, Thompson-Nicola	347	860	1975	North central (Fraser River–Thompson River)
Greenbush Lake Protected Area	PA	North Okanagan	2,820	7,000	2001	North central (Fraser River–Thompson River)
Greenstone Mountain Provincial Park	PP	Thompson-Nicola	124	310	1996	North central (Fraser River–Thompson River)
Grohman Narrows Provincial Park	PP	Central Kootenay	10	25	1981	Southeast (Columbia River–Kootenay River)
Gunboat Harbour Conservancy	C	North Coast	29	72	2008	Northwest (North coast)
Gwillim Lake Provincial Park	PP	Peace River	32,326	79,880	1981	Northeast (Peace River)
Gwyneth Lake Provincial Park	PP	Squamish-Lillooet	132	330	2010	North central (Fraser River)
Hai Lake-Mount Herman Provincial Park	PP	Kitimat-Stikine	323	800	2004	Northwest (Skeena River)
Hakai Lúxvbálís Conservancy	C	Central Coast	122,998	303,930	2008	North central (Central Coast)
Haley Lake Ecological Reserve	ER	Nanaimo	888	2,190	1987	Vancouver Island
Halkett Bay Marine Provincial Park	PP	Sunshine Coast	448	1,110	1988	Southwest (South coast)
Hamber Provincial Park *	PP	Columbia-Shuswap	25,137	62,110	1941	Southeast (Columbia River)
Hanna-Tintina Conservancy	C	Kitimat-Stikine	23,702	58,570	2013	Northwest (Nass River)
Harbour Dudgeon Lakes Provincial Park	PP	Thompson-Nicola	356	880	1996	North central (Fraser River–Thompson River)
Hardy Island Marine Provincial Park	PP	Sunshine Coast	14	35	1992	Southwest (South Coast)
Harmony Islands Marine Provincial Park	PP	Sunshine Coast	43	110	1992	Southwest (South Coast)
Harry Lake Aspen Provincial Park	PP	Thompson-Nicola	327	810	1996	North central (Fraser River–Thompson River)
Hay River Protected Area	PA	Northern Rockies	2,323	5,740	2001	Northeast (Hay River)
Haynes' Lease Ecological Reserve	ER	Okanagan-Similkameen	101	250	1980	Southeast (Columbia River–Okanagan River)
Heather Lake Ecological Reserve	ER	Fraser-Fort George	284	700	1978	
Heather-Dina Lakes Provincial Park	PP	Fraser-Fort George	5,786	14,300	2001	Northeast (Peace River)
Height of the Rockies Provincial Park	PP	East Kootenay	54,170	133,900	1995	Southeast (Columbia River–Kootenay River)
Helliwell Provincial Park	PP	Comox Valley	2,872	7,100	1966	Vancouver Island (Denman–Hornby Islands)
Hemer Provincial Park	PP	Nanaimo	109	270	1981	Vancouver Island
Herald Provincial Park	PP	Columbia-Shuswap	79	200	1975	North central (Fraser River–Thompson River)
Hesquiat Lake Provincial Park †	PP	Alberni-Clayoquot	62	150	1995	Vancouver Island
Hesquiat Peninsula Provincial Park †	PP	Alberni-Clayoquot	7,888	19,490	1995	Vancouver Island
High Lakes Basin Provincial Park	PP	Thompson-Nicola	570	1,400	1996	North central (Fraser River–Thompson River)
Hitchie Creek Provincial Park	PP	Alberni-Clayoquot	247	610	1995	Vancouver Island
Hole-in-the-Wall Provincial Park	PP	Peace River	137	340	2000	Northeast (Peace River)
Holliday Creek Arch Protected Area	PA	Fraser-Fort George	395	980	2001	North central (Fraser River headwaters)
Homathko Estuary Provincial Park	PP	Strathcona	450	1,100	1997	Southwest (South coast)
Homathko River-Tatlayoko Protected Area	PA	Cariboo, Strathcona	34,109	84,290	1996	Southwest (South coast)
Honeymoon Bay Ecological Reserve	ER	Cowichan Valley	7.5	19	1984	Vancouver Island
Horne Lake Caves Provincial Park	PP	Nanaimo	158	390	1971	Vancouver Island
Horneline Creek Provincial Park	PP	Stikine	298	740	1999	Northeast (Liard River)
Horsefly Lake Provincial Park	PP	Cariboo	186	460	1974	North central (Fraser River–Quesnel River, Fraser River headwaters)
Hotsprings-No Name Creek Conservancy	C	Central Coast	22,752	56,220	2008	North central (Central Coast)
Huchsduwachsdu Nuyem Jees/Kitlope Heritage Conservancy	C	Kitimat-Stikine	322,020	795,700	1996	North central (Central Coast)
Hudson Rocks Ecological Reserve	ER	Nanaimo	50	120	1996	Vancouver Island (Gulf Islands)
Hunwadi/Ahnuhati-Bald Conservancy	C	Mount Waddington	55,423	136,950	2006	Southwest (South coast)
Hyland River Provincial Park	PP	Stikine	34	84	1964	Northeast (Liard River)
Háthayim Marine Provincial Park	PP		1,291	3,190	1993	
Hənλəmdᶻi Məkola/Yorke Island Conservancy	C	Strathcona	39	96	2007	Vancouver Island
I7loqaw7/100 Lakes Plateau Conservancy	C	Squamish-Lillooet	1,030	2,500	2008	Southwest (Fraser River–Lillooet River, South coast)
Ilgachuz Range Ecological Reserve	ER	Cariboo	2,746	6,790	1975	North central (Fraser River, Central coast)
Indian Lake – Hitchcock Creek/Át Ch'îni Shà Conservancy	C	Stikine	60,619	149,790	2012	Northwest (Yukon River)
Inkaneep Provincial Park	PP	Okanagan-Similkameen	16	40	1956	Southeast (Columbia River–Okanagan River)
Inland Lake Provincial Park	PP	qathet	2,757	6,810	2000	Southwest (South coast)
Inonoaklin Provincial Park	PP*	Central Kootenay	12	30	1929	Southeast (Columbia River–Kootenay River)
Iskut River Hot Springs Provincial Park	PP	Kitimat-Stikine	6	15	2001	Northwest (Stikine River)
Itcha Ilgachuz Provincial Park	PP	Cariboo	109,063	269,500	1995	North central (Fraser River–Chilcotin River, Central coast)
Jackman Flats Provincial Park	PP	Fraser-Fort George	615	1,520	2000	North central (Fraser River headwaters)
Jackpine Remnant Provincial Park	PP	Northern Rockies	148	370	2001	Northeast (Liard River)
Jackson Narrows Marine Provincial Park	PP	Kitimat-Stikine	67	170	1992	North central (Central Coast)
James Chabot Provincial Park	PP	East Kootenay	14	35	1979	Southeast (Columbia River)
Jedediah Island Marine Provincial Park	PP	qathet	603	1,490	1995	Vancouver Island (Texada–Lasqueti Islands)
Jesse Falls Protected Area	PA	Kitimat-Stikine	32	79	2005	Northwest (North coast)
Jewel Lake Provincial Park	PP	Kootenay Boundary	49	120	1981	Southeast (Columbia River–Kettle River)
Jimsmith Lake Provincial Park	PP	East Kootenay	13.7	34	1956	Southeast (Columbia River–Kootenay River)
Joffre Lakes Provincial Park	PP	Squamish-Lillooet	1,487	3,670	1988	Southwest (Fraser River–Lillooet River)
Johnstone Creek Provincial Park	PP	Kootenay Boundary	38	94	1956	Southeast (Columbia River–Kettle River)
Juan de Fuca Provincial Park	PP	Capital	1,528	3,780	1996	Vancouver Island
Jump Across Conservancy	C	Central Coast	37,444	92,530	2008	North central (Central Coast)
Junction Sheep Range Provincial Park	PP	Cariboo	4,774	11,800	1995	North central (Fraser River, Fraser River–Chilcotin River)
Juniper Beach Provincial Park	PP	Thompson-Nicola	248	610	1989	North central (Fraser River–Thompson River)
Jáji7em and Kw'ulh Marine Provincial Park (Sandy Island Marine Park)	PP	Comox Valley	30	74	1966	Vancouver Island (Denman–Hornby Islands)
K'distsausk/Turtle Point Conservancy	C	Kitimat-Stikine	142	350	2007	Northwest (North coast)
K'lgaan/Klekane Conservancy	C	Kitimat-Stikine	18,272	45,150	2006	North central (Central coast)
Kakwa Provincial Park and Protected Area	PP, PA	Fraser-Fort George, Peace River	171,973	424,950	1987	Northeast (Peace River, Fraser River headwaters)
Kalamalka Lake Provincial Park and Protected Area	PP, PA	Central Okanagan, North Okanagan	3,218	7,950	1975	Southeast (Columbia River–Okanagan River)
Kamdis Heritage Site/Conservancy	C	North Coast	2,722	6,730	2008	Northwest (North coast–Haida Gwaii)
Katherine Tye Ecological Reserve	ER	Fraser Valley	3.1	7.7	1986	Southwest (Fraser River)
Kekuli Bay Provincial Park	PP	North Okanagan	57	140	1990	Southeast (Columbia River–Okanagan River)
Kennedy Island Conservancy	C	North Coast	4,970	12,300	2008	Northwest (North coast)
Kennedy Lake Provincial Park †	PP	Alberni-Clayoquot	241	600	1995	Vancouver Island
Kennedy River Bog Provincial Park †	PP	Alberni-Clayoquot	11	27	1995	Vancouver Island
Kentucky-Alleyne Provincial Park	PP	Thompson-Nicola	190	470	1981	North central (Fraser River–Thompson River)
Keremeos Columns Provincial Park	PP	Okanagan-Similkameen	20	49	1931	Southeast (Columbia River–Okanagan River)
Kettle River Recreation Area	RA	Kootenay Boundary	179	440	1972	Southeast (Columbia River–Kettle River)
Khtada Lake Conservancy	C	Kitimat-Stikine, North Coast	13,638	33,700	2008	Northwest (Skeena River)
Khutzeymateen Inlet Conservancy	C	Kitimat-Stikine, North Coast	12,947	31,990	2008	Northwest (North coast)
Khutzeymateen Inlet West Conservancy	C	North Coast	362	890	2008	Northwest (North coast)
Khutzeymateen Provincial Park	PP	North Coast	45,052	111,330	1994	Northwest (North coast)
Khyex Conservancy	C	North Coast	41,404	102,310	2008	Northwest (Skeena River)
Kianuko Provincial Park	PP	Central Kootenay	11,638	28,760	1995	Southeast (Columbia River–Kootenay River)
Kickininee Provincial Park	PP	Okanagan-Similkameen	48.76	120.5	1970	Southeast (Columbia River–Okanagan River)
Kiišḥniqʷus Conservancy	C	Alberni-Clayoquot	11,012	27,210	2024	Vancouver Island
Kikomun Creek Provincial Park	PP	East Kootenay	682	1,690	1972	Southeast (Columbia River–Kootenay River)
Kilbella Estuary Conservancy	C	Central Coast	376	930	2007	North central (Central Coast)
Kilby Provincial Park	PP	Fraser Valley	3	7.4	1973	Southwest (Fraser River)
Kimsquit Estuary Conservancy	C	Central Coast	126	310	2008	North central (Central Coast)
Kin Beach Provincial Park	PP*	Comox Valley	9	22	1966	Vancouver Island
Kinaskan Lake Provincial Park	PP	Kitimat-Stikine	1,800	4,400	1987	Northwest (Stikine River)
King George VI Provincial Park	PP	Kootenay Boundary	162	400	1937	Southeast (Columbia River)
Kingcome River/Atlatzi Ecological Reserve	ER	Mount Waddington	414	1,020	1972	Southwest (South coast)
Kingfisher Creek Ecological Reserve	ER	North Okanagan	1,495	3,690	1973	North central (Fraser River–Thompson River)
Kingfisher Creek Provincial Park	PP	Columbia-Shuswap	440	1,100	2001	North central (Fraser River–Thompson River)
Kiskatinaw Provincial Park	PP	Peace River	58	140	1962	Northeast (Peace River)
Kiskatinaw River Provincial Park	PP, PA	Peace River	154	380	2001	Northeast (Peace River)
Kitasoo Spirit Bear Conservancy	C	Kitimat-Stikine	102,875	254,210	2006	North central (Central Coast)
Kitimat River Provincial Park	PP	Kitimat-Stikine	57	140	2004	Northwest (North coast)
Kitson Island Marine Provincial Park	PP	North Coast	45	110	1993	Northwest (North coast)
Kitsumkalum Provincial Park	PP	Kitimat-Stikine	40	99	1947	Northwest (Skeena River)
Kitty Coleman Provincial Park	PP*	Comox Valley	10	25	1944	Vancouver Island
Kitwanga Mountain Provincial Park	PP	Kitimat-Stikine	720	1,800	1997	Northwest (Skeena River)
Klanawa River Ecological Reserve	ER	Alberni-Clayoquot	90	220	1996	Vancouver Island
Klaskish River Ecological Reserve	ER	Mount Waddington	132	330	1990	Vancouver Island
Kleanza Creek Provincial Park	PP	Kitimat-Stikine	216	530	1956	Northwest (Skeena River)
Klewnuggit Conservancy	C	North Coast	6,785	16,770	2008	Northwest (North coast)
Klewnuggit Inlet Marine Provincial Park	PP	North Coast	1,800	4,400	1993	Northwest (North coast)
Klin-se-za Provincial Park	PP	Peace River	2,689	6,640	2001	Northeast (Peace River)
Klua Lakes Protected Area	PA	Northern Rockies	28,018	69,230	2001	Northeast (Liard River)
Kluskoil Lake Provincial Park	PP	Cariboo	15,548	38,420	1995	North central (Fraser River)
K'mooda/Lowe-Gamble Conservancy	C	North Coast	14,454	35,720	2006	Northwest (North coast)
K'nabiyaaxl/Ashdown Conservancy	C	Kitimat-Stikine	727	1,800	2006	North central (Central Coast)
Koeye Conservancy	C	Central Coast	18,752	46,340	2006	North central (Central Coast)
Kokanee Creek Provincial Park	PP	Central Kootenay	260	640	1955	Southeast (Columbia River–Kootenay River)
Kokanee Glacier Provincial Park	PP	Central Kootenay	32,035	79,160	1922	Southeast (Columbia River–Kootenay River)
Koksilah River Provincial Park	PP	Cowichan Valley	230	570	1959	Vancouver Island
Kootenay Lake Provincial Park	PP	Central Kootenay	343	850	1987	Southeast (Columbia River–Kootenay River)
K'ootz/Khutze Conservancy	C	Kitimat-Stikine	34,168	84,430	2006	North central (Central Coast)
Kotcho Lake Ecological Reserve	ER	Northern Rockies	64	160	2000	Northeast (Hay River)
Kotcho Lake Village Provincial Park	PP	Northern Rockies	34	84	1999	Northeast (Hay River)
Ksgaxl/Stephens Island Conservancy	C	North Coast	14,018	34,640	2006	Northwest (North coast)
Ksi X'anmaas Conservancy	C	Kitimat-Stikine	33,581	82,980	2008	Northwest (North coast)
Ksi Xts'at'Kw/Stagoo Conservancy	C	Kitimat-Stikine	11,555	28,550	2006	Northwest (Nass River)
Kt'ii/Racey Conservancy	C	Kitimat-Stikine	1,261	3,120	2006	North central (Central Coast)
Ktisgaidz/MacDonald Bay Conservancy	C	Kitimat-Stikine	482	1,190	2007	Northwest (North coast)
Kts'mkta'ani/Union Lake Conservancy	C	North Coast	6,338	15,660	2008	Northwest (North coast)
Kunx̲alas Heritage Site/Conservancy	C	North Coast	15,718	38,840	2008	Northwest (North coast–Haida Gwaii)
K̲'uuna Gwaay Conservancy	C	North Coast	15,259	37,710	2008	Northwest (North coast–Haida Gwaii)
K'waal Conservancy	C	North Coast	3,300	8,200	2007	Northwest (North coast)
Kwadacha Wilderness Provincial Park	PP	Peace River	130,279	321,930	1973	Northeast (Peace River)
Kwatna Estuary Conservancy	C	Central Coast	330	820	2008	North central (Central Coast)
Kʷuḥaa Conservancy	C	Alberni-Clayoquot	1,916	4,730	2024	Vancouver Island
K'zuzált/Twin Two Conservancy	C	Squamish-Lillooet	2,095	5,180	2008	Southwest (Fraser River–Lillooet River)
Lac du Bois Grasslands Protected Area	PA	Thompson-Nicola	15,712	38,830	1996	North central (Fraser River–Thompson River)
Lac La Hache Provincial Park	PP	Cariboo	28	69	1956	North central (Fraser River)
Lac Le Jeune Provincial Park	PP	Thompson-Nicola	180	440	1956	North central (Fraser River–Thompson River)
Lady Douglas-Don Peninsula Conservancy	C	Central Coast	11,190	27,700	2007	North central (Central Coast)
Lakelse Lake Provincial Park	PP	Kitimat-Stikine	362	890	1956	Northwest (Skeena River)
Lakelse Lake Wetlands Provincial Park	PP	Kitimat-Stikine	1,214	3,000	2004	Northwest (Skeena River)
Lanz and Cox Islands Provincial Park	PP	Mount Waddington	5,556	13,730	1995	Vancouver Island
Larcom Lagoon Conservancy	C	Kitimat-Stikine	311	770	2007	Northwest (Nass River)
Lasqueti Island Ecological Reserve	ER	qathet	201	500	1971	Vancouver Island (Texada–Lasqueti Islands)
ȽÁU,WELṈEW̱/John Dean Provincial Park	PP	Capital	173	430	1921	Vancouver Island
Lava Forks Provincial Park	PP	Kitimat-Stikine	7,463	18,440	2001	Northwest (Stikine River)
Lawn Point Provincial Park	PP	Mount Waddington	594	1,470	1996	Vancouver Island
Lax Ka'gaas/Campania Conservancy	C	Kitimat-Stikine	20,504	50,670	2006	Northwest (North coast)
Lax Kul Nii Łuutiksm/Bonilla Conservancy	C	North Coast	1,584	3,910	2007	Northwest (North coast)
Lax Kwaxl/Dundas and Melville Islands Conservancy	C	North Coast	33,082	81,750	2008	Northwest (North coast)
Lax Kwil Dziidz/Fin Conservancy	C	Kitimat-Stikine	1,902	4,700	2006	Northwest (North coast)
Lepas Bay Ecological Reserve	ER	North Coast	1.5	3.7	1978	Northwest (North coast–Haida Gwaii)
Lew Creek Ecological Reserve	ER	Columbia-Shuswap	896	2,210	1972	Southeast (Columbia River—Kootenay River)
Liard River Corridor Provincial Park and Protected Area	PP, PA	Northern Rockies	179,710	444,100	1999	Northeast (Liard River)
Liard River Hot Springs Provincial Park	PP	Northern Rockies	1,082	2,670	1957	Northeast (Liard River)
Lily Pad Lake Ecological Reserve	ER	North Okanagan	101	250	1971	North central (Fraser River–Thompson River)
Little Andrews Bay Marine Provincial Park	PP	Bulkley-Nechako	102	250	1999	North central (Fraser River–Nechako River)
Little Qualicum Falls Provincial Park †	PP	Nanaimo	440	1,100	1940	Vancouver Island
Liumchen Ecological Reserve	ER	Fraser Valley	2,161	5,340	1998	Southwest (Fraser River)
Lockhart Beach Provincial Park	PP	Central Kootenay	8	20	1956 (Note: Park of same name existed 1933–1953)	Southeast (Columbia River–Kootenay River)
Lockhart Creek Provincial Park	PP	Central Kootenay	3,750	9,300	1995	Southeast (Columbia River–Kootenay River)
Lockhart-Gordon Conservancy	C	Central Coast	24,501	60,540	2007	North central (Central Coast)
Long Creek Provincial Park	PP	Cariboo	254	630	2013	North central (Fraser River–Quesnel River)
Long Island Conservancy	C	Bulkley-Nechako	850	2,100	2008	Northwest (Skeena River)
Loon Lake Provincial Park	PP	Thompson-Nicola	8.7	21	1956	North central (Fraser River–Thompson River)
Loveland Bay Provincial Park	PP	Strathcona	30	74	1989	Vancouver Island
Lowe Inlet Marine Provincial Park	PP	North Coast	765	1,890	1993	Northwest (North coast)
Lower Nimpkish Provincial Park	PP	Mount Waddington	200	490	1995	Vancouver Island
Lower Raush Protected Area	PA	Fraser-Fort George	1,279	3,160	2001	North central (Fraser River headwaters)
Lower Skeena River Provincial Park	PP	North Coast	582	1,440	2004	Northwest (Skeena River)
Lower Tsitika River Provincial Park	PP	Mount Waddington	3,745	9,250	1995	Vancouver Island
Lucy Islands Conservancy Area	C	North Coast	206	510	2008	Northwest (North coast)
Mabel Lake Provincial Park	PP	North Okanagan	193	480	1972	North central (Fraser River–Thompson River)
Machmell Conservancy	C	Central Coast	1,814	4,480	2007	North central (Central Coast)
Mackinnon Esker Ecological Reserve	ER	Fraser-Fort George	545	1,350	1972	Northeast (Peace River)
MacMillan Provincial Park †	PP	Nanaimo	301	740	1947	Vancouver Island
Mahoney Lake Ecological Reserve	ER	Okanagan-Similkameen	39	96	1972	Southeast (Columbia River–Okanagan River)
Mahpahkum-Ahkwuna/ Deserters-Walker Conservancy	C	Mount Waddington	7,369	18,210	2006	North central (Central Coast)
Main Lake Provincial Park	PP	Strathcona	3,530	8,700	1996	Vancouver Island (Discovery Islands)
Malaspina Provincial Park	PP	qathet	572	1,410	2001	Southwest (South coast)
Mansons Landing Provincial Park	PP	Strathcona	100	250	1974	Vancouver Island (Discovery Islands)
Manzanita Cove Conservancy	C	Kitimat-Stikine	62	150	2008	Northwest (North coast)
Nism̓aakqin Park †	PP, PA	Alberni-Clayoquot	2,720	6,700	1955	Vancouver Island
Mara Meadows Ecological Reserve	ER	North Okanagan	178	440	1972	North central (Fraser River–Thompson River)
Mara Meadows Provincial Park	PP	North Okanagan	212	520	2008	North central (Fraser River–Thompson River)
Mara Provincial Park	PP	North Okanagan	13	32	1958	North central (Fraser River–Thompson River)
Marble Canyon Provincial Park	PP	Squamish-Lillooet, Thompson-Nicola	2,544	6,290	1956	North central (Fraser River, Fraser River-Thompson River)
Marble Range Provincial Park	PP	Thompson-Nicola	19,236	47,530	1995	North central (Fraser River-Thompson River, Fraser River)
Marble River Provincial Park	PP	Mount Waddington	1,419	3,510	1995	Vancouver Island
Marl Creek Provincial Park	PP	Columbia-Shuswap	167	410	1961	Southeast (Columbia River)
Martha Creek Provincial Park	PP	Columbia-Shuswap	71	180	1993	Southeast (Columbia River)
Maxhamish Lake Provincial Park and Protected Area	PP, PA	Northern Rockies	27,516	67,990	1983	Northeast (Liard River)
Maxtaktsm'aa/Union Passage Conservancy	C	North Coast	2,519	6,220	2007	Northwest (North coast)
McConnell Lake Provincial Park	PP	Thompson-Nicola	102	250	1996	North central (Fraser River–Thompson River)
McDonald Creek Provincial Park	PP	Central Kootenay	468	1,160	1982	Southeast (Columbia River)
McQueen Creek Ecological Reserve	ER	Thompson-Nicola	35	86	1982	North central (Fraser River–Thompson River)
Megin River Ecological Reserve †	ER	Alberni-Clayoquot	54	130	1981	Vancouver Island
Mehatl Creek Provincial Park	PP	Fraser Valley	23,860	59,000	1997	North central (Fraser River)
Memory Island Provincial Park	PP	Cowichan Valley	0.9	2.2	1945	Vancouver Island
Meridian Road (Vanderhoof) Ecological Reserve	ER	Bulkley-Nechako	262	650	1977	North central (Fraser River–Nechako River)
Meziadin Lake Provincial Park	PP	Kitimat-Stikine	335	830	1987	Northwest (Nass River)
Milligan Hills Provincial Park	PP	Peace River	7,226	17,860	1999	Northeast (Hay River, Liard River)
Miracle Beach Provincial Park	PP	Comox Valley	137	340	1950	Vancouver Island
Misty Lake Ecological Reserve	ER	Mount Waddington	73	180	1996	Vancouver Island
Mitlenatch Island Nature Provincial Park	PP	Strathcona	155	380	1961	Vancouver Island (Discovery Islands)
Mkwal'ts Conservancy	C	Squamish-Lillooet	3,874	9,570	2010	Southwest (Fraser River–Lillooet River)
Moberly Lake Provincial Park	PP	Peace River	102	250	1966	Northeast (Peace River)
Moksgm'ol/Chapple–Cornwall Conservancy	C	Kitimat-Stikine	29,116	71,950	2006	North central (Central Coast)
Momich Lakes Provincial Park	PP	Thompson-Nicola	1,605	3,970	1996	North central (Fraser River–Thompson River)
Monarch Mountain/A Xée.g. Deiyi Conservancy	C	Stikine	424	1,050	2012	Northwest (Yukon River)
Monashee Provincial Park	PP	Central Kootenay, North Okanagan	22,722	56,150	1962	North central (Fraser River–Thompson River, Columbia River)
Monck Provincial Park	PP	Thompson-Nicola	118	290	1951	North central (Fraser River–Thompson River)
Monckton Nii Łuutiksm Conservancy	C	North Coast	24,775	61,220	2006	Northwest (North coast)
Monkman Provincial Park	PP	Fraser-Fort George, Peace River	62,867	155,350	1981	Northeast (Peace River, Fraser River headwaters)
Montague Harbour Marine Provincial Park	PP	Capital	102	250	1959	Vancouver Island (Gulf Islands)
Monte Creek Provincial Park	PP	Thompson-Nicola	3	7.4	1996	North central (Fraser River–Thompson River)
Monte Lake Provincial Park	PP	Thompson-Nicola	5	12	1956	North central (Fraser River–Thompson River)
Moore/McKenney/Whitmore Islands Ecological Reserve	ER	Kitimat-Stikine	206	510	1971	North central (Central Coast)
Moose Valley Provincial Park	PP	Cariboo	2,500	6,200	1995	North central (Fraser River)
Morden Colliery Historic Provincial Park	PP	Nanaimo	4	9.9	1972	Vancouver Island
Morice Lake Provincial Park	PP	Bulkley-Nechako	52,430	129,600	2008	Northwest (Skeena River)
Morice River Ecological Reserve	ER	Bulkley-Nechako	355	880	1977	Northwest (Skeena River)
Morrissey Provincial Park	PP	East Kootenay	4.5	11	1962	Southeast (Columbia River–Kootenay River)
Morton Lake Provincial Park	PP	Strathcona	74	180	1966	Vancouver Island
Mount Assiniboine Provincial Park *	PP	East Kootenay	39,013	96,400	1922	Southeast (Columbia River–Kootenay River)
Mount Blanchet Provincial Park	PP	Bulkley-Nechako	24,774	61,220	2001	North central (Fraser River–Nechako River)
Mount Derby Ecological Reserve	ER	Mount Waddington	557	1,380	1989	Vancouver Island
Mount Edziza Provincial Park	PP	Kitimat-Stikine	230,000	570,000	1972	Northwest (Stikine River)
Mount Elliott Ecological Reserve	ER	Mount Waddington	324	800	1989	Vancouver Island
Mount Elphinstone Provincial Park	PP	Sunshine Coast	141	350	2000	Southwest (South coast)
Mount Erskine Provincial Park	PP	Capital	107	260	2007	Vancouver Island (Gulf Islands)
Mount Fernie Provincial Park	PP	East Kootenay	259	640	1959	Southeast (Columbia River–Kootenay River)
Mount Geoffrey Escarpment Provincial Park	PP	Comox Valley	187	460	2004	Vancouver Island (Denman–Hornby Islands)
Mount Griffin Ecological Reserve	ER	Thompson-Nicola	1,249	3,090	1972	North central (Fraser River–Thompson River)
Mount Griffin Provincial Park	PP	Columbia-Shuswap, Thompson-Nicola	1,758	4,340	2001	North central (Fraser River–Thompson River)
Mount Maxwell Ecological Reserve	ER	Capital	418	1,030	1972	Vancouver Island (Gulf Islands)
Mount Maxwell Provincial Park	PP	Capital	231	570	1938	Vancouver Island (Gulf Islands)
Mount Minto/K'iyán Conservancy	C	Stikine	5,657	13,980	2012	Northwest (Yukon River)
Mount Pope Provincial Park	PP	Bulkley-Nechako	2,030	5,000	2001	North central (Fraser River–Nechako River)
Mount Richardson Provincial Park	PP	Sunshine Coast	1,000	2,500	1999	Southwest (South coast)
Mount Robson Provincial Park *	PP	Fraser-Fort George	225,285	556,690	1913	North central (Fraser River headwaters)
Mount Sabine Ecological Reserve	ER	East Kootenay	8	20	1971	Southeast (Columbia River)
Mount Savona Provincial Park	PP	Thompson-Nicola	382	940	1996	North central (Fraser River–Thompson River)
Mount Seymour Provincial Park	PP	Metro Vancouver	3,509	8,670	1936	Southwest (South coast)
Mount Terry Fox Provincial Park	PP	Fraser-Fort George	1,930	4,800	1982	North central (Fraser River headwaters)
Mount Tinsdale Ecological Reserve	ER	Cariboo	419	1,040	1975	North central (Fraser River–Quesnel River, Fraser River headwaters)
Mount Tuam Ecological Reserve	ER	Capital	362	890	1971	Vancouver Island (Gulf Islands)
Mount Tzuhalem Ecological Reserve	ER	Cowichan Valley	18	44	1984	Vancouver Island
Moyie Lake Provincial Park	PP	East Kootenay	90	220	1959	Southeast (Columbia River–Kootenay River)
Mud Lake Delta Provincial Park	PP	Thompson-Nicola	435	1,070	1996	North central (Fraser River–Thompson River)
Mudzenchoot Provincial Park	PP	Bulkley-Nechako	644	1,590	2001	Northeast (Peace River, Fraser River headwaters)
Muncho Lake Provincial Park	PP	Northern Rockies	88,420	218,500	1957	Northeast (Liard River)
M^{q}uqʷin/Brooks Peninsula Provincial Park	PP	Mount Waddington, Strathcona	39,936	98,680	1986	Vancouver Island
Murrin Provincial Park	PP	Squamish-Lillooet	32	79	1962	Southwest (South coast)
Muscovite Lakes Provincial Park	PP	Peace River	5,708	14,100	2001	Northeast (Peace River)
Myra-Bellevue Provincial Park	PP, PA	Central Okanagan, Kootenay Boundary	7,677	18,970	2001	Southeast (Columbia River–Okanagan River, Kettle River)
Nadina Mountain Provincial Park	PP	Bulkley-Nechako	2,789	6,890	2008	North central (Fraser River–Nechako River, Skeena River)
Nahatlatch Provincial Park and Protected Area	PP, PA	Fraser Valley	2,009	4,960	1999	North central (Fraser River)
Naikoon Provincial Park	PP	North Coast	69,071	170,680	1973	Northwest (North coast–Haida Gwaii)
Nairn Falls Provincial Park	PP	Squamish-Lillooet	170	420	1966	Southwest (Fraser River–Lillooet River)
Nakina – Inklin Rivers/Yáwu Yaa Conservancy	C	Stikine	167,259	413,310	2012	Northwest (Taku River, Yukon River)
Nakina – Inklin Rivers (Kuthai Area)/Yáwu Yaa Conservancy	C	Stikine	26,047	64,360	2012	Northwest (Taku River, Yukon River)
Nalbeelah Creek Wetlands Provincial Park	PP	Kitimat-Stikine	171	420	2004	Northwest (North coast)
Namu Conservancy	C	Central Coast	10,312	25,480	2008	North central (Central Coast)
Namu Corridor Conservancy	C	Central Coast	83	210	2008	North central (Central Coast)
Nancy Greene Provincial Park	PP	Kootenay Boundary	203	500	1972	Southeast (Columbia River)
Nang Xaldangaas Conservancy	C	North Coast	16,695	41,250	2008	Northwest (North coast–Haida Gwaii)
Narcosli Lake Ecological Reserve	ER	Cariboo	1,098	2,710	1973	North central (Fraser River)
Nation Lakes Provincial Park	PP	Bulkley-Nechako	19,398	47,930	2004	Northeast (Peace River)
Nazko Lake Provincial Park	PP	Cariboo	7,854	19,410	1955	North central (Fraser River)
Neʼāhʼ Conservancy	C	Stikine	233,304	576,510	2013	Northeast (Liard River)
Nechako Canyon Protected Area	PA	Bulkley-Nechako	1,246	3,080	2000	North central (Fraser River–Nechako River)
Nechako River Ecological Reserve	ER	Fraser-Fort George	133	330	1975	North central (Fraser River–Nechako River)
Neǧiƛ/Nekite Estuary Conservancy	C	Central Coast	481	1,190	2007	North central (Central Coast)
Nenikëkh / Nanika-Kidprice Provincial Park	PP	Bulkley-Nechako	17,006	42,020	2008	Northwest (Skeena River)
Netalzul Meadows Provincial Park	PP	Kitimat-Stikine	292	720	1999	Northwest (Skeena River)
Nickel Plate Provincial Park	PP	Okanagan-Similkameen	105	260	1938	Southeast (Columbia River–Okanagan River)
Nicolum River Provincial Park	PP	Fraser Valley	18	44	1956	Southwest (Fraser River)
Nilkitkwa Lake Provincial Park	PP	Bulkley-Nechako	10	25	1999	Northwest (Skeena River)
Nimpkish River Ecological Reserve	ER	Mount Waddington	19	47	1988	Vancouver Island
Nimpkish Lake Provincial Park	PP	Mount Waddington	3,949	9,760	1995	Vancouver Island
Ningunsaw River Ecological Reserve	ER	Kitimat-Stikine	2,372	5,860	1975	Northwest (Stikine River)
Ningunsaw Provincial Park	PP	Kitimat-Stikine	15,704	38,810	2001	Northwest (Stikine River)
Niskonlith Lake Provincial Park	PP	Thompson-Nicola	275	680	1975	North central (Fraser River–Thompson River)
Nitinat Lake Ecological Reserve	ER	Cowichan Valley	77	190	1974	Vancouver Island
Nitinat River Provincial Park	PP	Alberni-Clayoquot, Cowichan Valley	160	400	1996	Vancouver Island
Nlháxten/Cerise Creek Conservancy	C	Squamish-Lillooet	2,272	5,610	2008	North central (Fraser River)
Nooseseck Conservancy	C	Central Coast	1,603	3,960	2008	North central (Central Coast)
Norbury Lake Provincial Park	PP	East Kootenay	97	240	1958	Southeast (Columbia River–Kootenay River)
North Spit Conservancy	C	Bulkley-Nechako	19	47	2008	Northwest (Skeena River)
North Thompson Islands Provincial Park	PP	Thompson-Nicola	78	190	1996	North central (Fraser River–Thompson River)
North Thompson Oxbows East Provincial Park	PP	Thompson-Nicola	288	710	1996	North central (Fraser River–Thompson River)
North Thompson Oxbows Jensen Island Provincial Park	PP	Thompson-Nicola	30	74	1996	North central (Fraser River–Thompson River)
North Thompson Oxbows Manteau Provincial Park	PP	Thompson-Nicola	515	1,270	1996	North central (Fraser River–Thompson River)
North Thompson River Provincial Park	PP	Thompson-Nicola	126	310	1967	North central (Fraser River–Thompson River)
Northern Rocky Mountains Provincial Park	PP, PA	Northern Rockies	665,709	1,645,000	1999	Northeast (Liard River)
Nuchatlitz Provincial Park	PP	Strathcona	2,105	5,200	1996	Vancouver Island
Nuntsi Provincial Park	PP	Cariboo	20,570	50,800	1995	North central (Fraser River–Chilcotin River)
Oak Bay Islands Ecological Reserve	ER	Capital	232	570	2001	Vancouver Island (Gulf Islands)
Octopus Islands Marine Provincial Park	PP	Strathcona	862	2,130	1974	Vancouver Island (Discovery Islands)
Okanagan Lake Provincial Park	PP	Okanagan-Similkameen	90	220	1955	Southeast (Columbia River–Okanagan River)
Okanagan Mountain Provincial Park	PP	Okanagan-Similkameen	11,296	27,910	1973	Southeast (Columbia River–Okanagan River)
Okeover Arm Provincial Park	PP	qathet	4	9.9	2000	Southwest (South coast)
Old Man Lake Provincial Park	PP	Bulkley-Nechako	326	810	2008	Northwest (Skeena River)
Oliver Cove Marine Provincial Park	PP	Central Coast	62	150	1992	North central (Central Coast)
Omineca Provincial Park and Protected Area	PP, PA	Bulkley-Nechako, Peace River, Stikine	132,296	326,910	2001	Northeast (Peace River)
One Island Lake Provincial Park	PP	Peace River	61	150	1963	Northeast (Peace River)
Oregana Creek Provincial Park	PP	Thompson-Nicola	286	710	2010	North central (Fraser River–Thompson River)
Oregon Jack Provincial Park	PP	Thompson-Nicola	230	570	1996	North central (Fraser River–Thompson River)
Ospika Cones Ecological Reserve	ER	Peace River	1,282	3,170	2001	Northeast (Peace River)
Otter Lake Provincial Park	PP, PA	Okanagan-Similkameen	49	120	1963	Southeast (Columbia River–Okanagan River)
Outer Central Coast Islands Conservancy	C	Central Coast	14,839	36,670	2005	North central (Central Coast)
Owikeno Conservancy	C	Central Coast	70,569	174,380	2007	North central (Central Coast)
Owyacumish River Provincial Park	PP	Kitimat-Stikine	805	1,990	2004	Northwest (North coast)
Pa-aat Conservancy	C	North Coast	4,768	11,780	2008	Northwest (North coast)
Paarens Beach Provincial Park	PP	Bulkley-Nechako	50	120	1972	North central (Fraser River–Nechako River)
Painted Bluffs Provincial Park	PP	Thompson-Nicola	98	240	1996	North central (Fraser River–Nechako River)
Pałəmin/Estero Basin Conservancy	C	Strathcona	2,978	7,360	2007	Southwest (South coast)
Parker Lake Ecological Reserve	ER	Northern Rockies	259	640	1973	Northeast (Liard River)
Patsuk Creek Ecological Reserve	ER	Fraser-Fort George	438	1,080	1978	Northeast (Peace River)
Patterson Lake Provincial Park	PP	Cariboo	1,595	3,940	2013	North central (Fraser River–Chilcotin River)
Paul Lake Provincial Park	PP	Thompson-Nicola	728	1,800	1961	North central (Fraser River–Thompson River)
Peace Arch Provincial Park	PP	Metro Vancouver	9	22	1939	Southwest (South coast)
Peace River Corridor Provincial Park	PP	Peace River	2,014	4,980	2000	Northeast (Peace River)
Pennask Creek Provincial Park	PP	Thompson-Nicola	1,243	3,070	2001	North central (Fraser River–Thompson River)
Pennask Lake Provincial Park	PP	Thompson-Nicola	244	600	1974	North central (Fraser River–Thompson River)
Penrose Island Marine Provincial Park	PP	Central Coast	2,095	5,180	1992	North central (Central Coast)
Penrose-Ripon Conservancy	C	Central Coast	2,229	5,510	2007	North central (Central Coast)
Petroglyph Provincial Park	PP	Nanaimo	1.8	4.4	1948	Vancouver Island
Phillips Estuary/ʔNacinuxʷ Conservancy	C	Strathcona	1,461	3,610	2007	Southwest (South coast)
Pillar Provincial Park	PP	Thompson-Nicola	2.3	5.7	2004	North central (Fraser River–Thompson River)
Pilot Bay Provincial Park	PP	Central Kootenay	347	860	1964	Southeast (Columbia River–Kootenay River)
Pine Le Moray Provincial Park	PP	Fraser-Fort George, Peace River	43,245	106,860	2000	Northeast (Peace River)
Pinecone Burke Provincial Park	PP	Fraser Valley, Metro Vancouver, Squamish-Lillooet	38,000	94,000	1995	Southwest (Fraser River, South coast)
Pink Mountain Provincial Park	PP	Peace River	92	230	1999	Northeast (Peace River)
Pine River Breaks Provincial Park	PP	Peace River	614	1,520	2000	Northeast (Peace River)
Pinnacles Provincial Park	PP	Cariboo	124	310	1969	North central (Fraser River)
Pirates Cove Marine Provincial Park	PP	Nanaimo	32	79	1968	Vancouver Island (Gulf Islands)
Pitman River Protected Area	PA	Stikine	16,316	40,320	2001	Northwest (Stikine River)
Pitt Polder Ecological Reserve	ER	Metro Vancouver	88	220	1980	Southwest (Fraser River)
Plumper Cove Marine Provincial Park	PP	Sunshine Coast	66	160	1960	Southwest (South coast)
Polkinghorne Islands Conservancy	C	Mount Waddington	154	380	2009	Southwest (South coast)
Pooley Island Conservancy	C	Kitimat-Stikine	3,269	8,080	2006	North central (Central Coast)
Porcupine Meadows Provincial Park	PP	Thompson-Nicola	2,703	6,680	1996	North central (Fraser River–Thompson River)
Porpoise Bay Provincial Park	PP	Sunshine Coast	61	150	1971	Southwest (South coast)
Portage Brule Rapids Ecological Reserve and Protected Area	ER, PA	Northern Rockies	1,151	2,840	2000	Northeast (Liard River)
Porteau Cove Provincial Park	PP	Squamish-Lillooet	56	140	1981	Southwest (South coast)
Port Arthur Conservancy	C	Bulkley-Nechako	342	850	2008	Northwest (Skeena River)
Hisnit River Watershed Protected Area	PA	Strathcona	1,680	4,200	2011	Vancouver Island
Premier Lake Provincial Park	PP	East Kootenay	837	2,070	1940	Southeast (Columbia River–Kootenay River)
Princess Louisa Marine Provincial Park	PP	Sunshine Coast	964	2,380	1965	Southwest (South coast)
Pritchard Provincial Park	PP	Thompson-Nicola	43	110	1997	North central (Fraser River–Thompson River)
Prophet River Hotsprings Provincial Park	PP	Peace River	184	450	1999	Northeast (Liard River)
Prophet River Wayside Provincial Park	PP	Peace River	113	280	1977	Northeast (Liard River)
Prudhomme Lake Provincial Park	PP	North Coast	9	22	1964	Northwest (North coast)
Ptarmigan Creek Provincial Park and Protected Area	PP, PA	Fraser-Fort George	4,633	11,450	2000	North central (Fraser River headwaters)
Pukeashun Provincial Park	PP	Columbia-Shuswap	1,779	4,400	2001	North central (Fraser River–Thompson River)
Puntchesakut Lake Provincial Park	PP	Cariboo	38	94	1980	North central (Fraser River)
Punti Island Provincial Park	PP	Cariboo	12	30	2013	North central (Fraser River–Chilcotin River)
Purcell Wilderness Conservancy Provincial Park and Protected Area	PP, PA	Central Kootenay, East Kootenay	202,709	500,900	1974	Southeast (Columbia River–Kootenay River)
Purden Lake Provincial Park	PP	Fraser-Fort George	2,521	6,230	1971	North central (Fraser River headwaters)
Pure Lake Provincial Park	PP	North Coast	142	350	1981	Northwest (North coast–Haida Gwaii)
Pyramid Creek Falls Provincial Park	PP	Thompson-Nicola	12	30	1996	North central (Fraser River–Thompson River)
Q'altanaas/Aaltanhash Conservancy	C	Kitimat-Stikine	18,767	46,370	2006	North central (Central Coast)
Quatsino Provincial Park	PP	Mount Waddington	654	1,620	1995	Vancouver Island
Qudəs/Gillard-Jimmy Judd Island Conservancy	C	Strathcona	45	110	2007	Vancouver Island (Discovery Islands)
Quesnel Lake Provincial Park	PP	Cariboo	992	2,450	2013	North central (Fraser River–Quesnel River)
Qwalímak/Upper Birkenhead Conservancy	C	Squamish-Lillooet	4,888	12,080	2008	Southwest (Fraser River–Lillooet River)
Qwiquallaaq/Boat Bay Conservancy	C	Mount Waddington	1,375	3,400	2007	Southwest (South coast)
Race Rocks Ecological Reserve	ER	Capital	220	540	1980	Vancouver Island (Gulf Islands)
Raft Cove Provincial Park	PP	Mount Waddington	787	1,940	1990	Vancouver Island
Rainbow Alley Provincial Park	PP	Bulkley-Nechako	110	270	1999	Northwest (Skeena River)
Rainbow/Q'iwentem Provincial Park	PP	Cariboo	385	950	2013	North central (Fraser River–Thompson River)
Ram Creek Ecological Reserve	ER	East Kootenay	121	300	1971	Southeast (Columbia River–Kootenay River)
Raspberry Harbour Ecological Reserve	ER	Peace River	143	350	1978	Northeast (Peace River)
Rathtrevor Beach Provincial Park †	PP	Nanaimo	347	860	1967	Vancouver Island
Read Island Provincial Park	PP	Strathcona	637	1,570	1996	Vancouver Island (Discovery Islands)
Rearguard Falls Provincial Park	PP	Fraser-Fort George	46	110	1991	North central (Fraser River headwaters)
Rebecca Spit Marine Provincial Park	PP	Strathcona	148	370	1959	Vancouver Island (Discovery Islands)
Red Bluff Provincial Park	PP	Bulkley-Nechako	148	370	1978	Northwest (Skeena River)
Redbrush Provincial Park	PP	Cariboo	1,165	2,880	2013	North central (Fraser River–Chilcotin River)
Redfern-Keily Provincial Park	PP	Peace River	80,712	199,440	1999	Northeast (Liard River)
Rendezvous Island South Provincial Park	PP	Strathcona	164	410	1997	Vancouver Island (Discovery Islands)
Rescue Bay Conservancy	C	Kitimat-Stikine	221	550	2007	North central (Central Coast)
Restoration Bay Conservancy	C	Central Coast	826	2,040	2008	North central (Central Coast)
Roberts Creek Provincial Park	PP	Sunshine Coast	40	99	1947	Southwest (South Coast)
Roberts Memorial Provincial Park	PP	Nanaimo	14	35	1980	Vancouver Island
Robson Bight (Michael Bigg) Ecological Reserve	ER	Mount Waddington	1,715	4,240	1982	Vancouver Island
Roche Lake Provincial Park	PP	Thompson-Nicola	2,027	5,010	1996	North central (Fraser River–Thompson River)
Rock Bay Marine Provincial Park	PP	Strathcona	525	1,300	1995	Vancouver Island
Rolla Canyon Ecological Reserve	ER	Peace River	43	110	2000	Northeast (Peace River)
Rolley Lake Provincial Park	PP	Fraser Valley	115	280	1961	Southwest (Fraser River)
Roscoe Bay Provincial Park	PP	Strathcona	252	620	1989	Vancouver Island (Discovery Islands)
Rose Islets Ecological Reserve	ER	Cowichan Valley	0.8	2.0	1971	Vancouver Island (Gulf Islands)
Rose Spit Ecological Reserve	ER	North Coast	202	500	1971	Northwest (North coast–Haida Gwaii)
Rosebery Provincial Park	PP	Central Kootenay	32	79	1959	Southeast (Columbia River–Kootenay River)
Rosewall Creek Provincial Park	PP	Comox Valley	54	130	1956	Vancouver Island
Ross Lake Ecological Reserve	ER	Fraser Valley	64	160	1971	Southeast (Skagit River)
Ross Lake Provincial Park	PP	Kitimat-Stikine	307	760	1974	Northwest (Skeena River)
Rubyrock Lake Provincial Park	PP	Bulkley-Nechako	41,221	101,860	2001	North central (Fraser River–Nechako River)
Ruckle Provincial Park	PP	Capital	529	1,310	1974	Vancouver Island (Gulf Islands)
Rugged Point Marine Provincial Park	PP	Strathcona	349	860	1989	Vancouver Island
Ruth Lake Provincial Park	PP	Cariboo	30	74	1959	North central (Fraser River–Thompson River)
Ryan Provincial Park	PP	Central Kootenay	58	140	1959	Southeast (Columbia River–Kootenay River)
Sabine Channel Provincial Park	PP	qathet	2,254	5,570	2001	Vancouver Island (Texada–Lasqueti Islands)
Saltery Bay Provincial Park	PP	qathet	69	170	1962	Southwest (South coast)
San Juan Ridge Ecological Reserve	ER	Capital	96	240	1977	Vancouver Island
San Juan River Ecological Reserve	ER	Capital	191	470	1996	Vancouver Island
Sanctuary Bay Conservancy	C	Bulkley-Nechako	820	2,000	2008	Northwest (Skeena River)
Sand Point Conservancy	C	Bulkley-Nechako	11	27	2008	Northwest (Skeena River)
Sandwell Provincial Park	PP	Nanaimo	17	42	1988	Vancouver Island (Gulf Islands)
Santa Gertrudis-Boca del Infierno Provincial Park	PP	Strathcona	440	1,100	1996	Vancouver Island
Sargeant Bay Provincial Park	PP	Sunshine Coast	146	360	1990	Southwest (South coast)
Sartine Island Ecological Reserve	ER	Mount Waddington	1,091	2,700	1971	Vancouver Island
Sasquatch Provincial Park	PP	Fraser Valley	1,229	3,040	1968	Southwest (Fraser River)
Satellite Channel Ecological Reserve	ER	Capital	340	840	1975	Vancouver Island (Gulf Islands)
Say Nuth Khaw Yum Provincial Park (aka Indian Arm Park)	PP	Metro Vancouver	6,689	16,530	1995	Southwest (South coast)
Saysutshun (Newcastle Island Marine) Park	PP	Nanaimo	363	900	1961	Vancouver Island (Gulf Islands)
Scatter River Old Growth Provincial Park	PP	Northern Rockies	1,140	2,800	1999	Northeast (Liard River)
Schoen Lake Provincial Park	PP	Mount Waddington	8,775	21,680	1977	Vancouver Island
Schoolhouse Lake Provincial Park	PP	Cariboo	5,106	12,620	1995	North central (Fraser River–Thompson River)
Sechelt Inlets Marine Provincial Park	PP	Sunshine Coast	140	350	1980	Southwest (South coast)
Seeley Lake Provincial Park	PP	Kitimat-Stikine	24	59	1956	Northwest (Skeena River)
Seton Portage Historic Provincial Park	PP	Squamish-Lillooet	0.7	1.7	1972	North central (Fraser River)
Seven Sisters Provincial Park and Protected Area	PP, PA	Kitimat-Stikine	39,206	96,880	2000	Northwest (Skeena River)
Sɢ̲aay Taw Siiwaay K'adjuu Heritage Site/Conservancy	C	North Coast	597	1,480	2008	Northwest (North coast–Haida Gwaii)
Shannon Falls Provincial Park	PP	Squamish-Lillooet	86	210	1984	Southwest (South coast)
Shearwater Hot Springs Conservancy	C	Kitimat-Stikine	33	82	2007	North central (Central Coast)
Sheemahant Conservancy	C	Central Coast	1,015	2,510	2007	North central (Central Coast)
Shuswap Lake Provincial Park	PP	Columbia-Shuswap	154	380	1956	North central (Fraser River–Thompson River)
Shuswap Lake Marine Provincial Park	PP	Columbia-Shuswap	894	2,210	1980	North central (Fraser River–Thompson River)
Shuswap River Islands Provincial Park	PP	North Okanagan	185	460	2004	North central (Fraser River–Thompson River)
Sikanni Chief Canyon Provincial Park	PP, PA	Peace River	4,641	11,470	2001	Northeast (Liard River)
Sikanni Chief Falls Protected Area	PA	Peace River	606	1,500	2006	Northeast (Liard River)
Sikanni Chief River Ecological Reserve	ER	Peace River	2,173	5,370	1973	Northeast (Liard River)
Sikanni Old Growth Provincial Park	PP	Peace River	1,439	3,560	1999	Northeast (Liard River)
Silver Beach Provincial Park	PP	Columbia-Shuswap	130	320	1969	North central (Fraser River–Thompson River)
Silver Lake Provincial Park	PP	Fraser Valley	77	190	1964	Southwest (Fraser River)
Silver Star Provincial Park	PP*	North Okanagan	5,573	13,770	1940	North central (Fraser River–Thompson River, Columbia River–Okanagan River)
Simpson Lake East Conservancy	C	North Coast	54	130	2007	Northwest (North coast)
Simson Provincial Park	PP	Sunshine Coast	461	1,140	1986	Southwest (South coast)
Sir Alexander Mackenzie Provincial Park	PP	Central Coast	5.3	13	1926	North central (Central Coast)
Six Mile Hill Protected Area	PA	Thompson-Nicola	151	370	2001	North central (Fraser River–Thompson River)
Skagit River Cottonwoods Ecological Reserve	ER	Fraser Valley	69	170	1978	Southeast (Skagit River)
Skagit River Forest Ecological Reserve	ER	Fraser Valley	73	180	1971	Southeast (Skagit River)
Skagit River Rhododendrons Ecological Reserve	ER	Fraser Valley	70	170	1981	Southeast (Skagit River)
Skagit Valley Provincial Park	PP	Fraser Valley	27,964	69,100	1973	Southeast (Skagit River)
Skaha Bluffs Provincial Park	PP	Okanagan-Similkameen	489	1,210	2009	Southeast (Columbia River–Okanagan River)
Skeena Bank Conservancy	C	North Coast	2,594	6,410	2008	Northwest (Skeena River)
Skeena River Ecological Reserve	ER	Kitimat-Stikine	341	840	1975	Northwest (Skeena River)
Skihist Ecological Reserve	ER	Thompson-Nicola	40	99	1978	North central (Fraser River–Thompson River)
Skihist Provincial Park	PP	Thompson-Nicola	386	950	1956	North central (Fraser River–Thompson River)
Skookumchuk Narrows Provincial Park	PP	Sunshine Coast	123	300	1957	Southwest (South coast)
Skookumchuk Rapids Provincial Park	PP	North Okanagan	71	180	2004	North central (Fraser River–Thompson River)
Skwaha Lake Ecological Reserve	ER	Thompson-Nicola	849	2,100	1978	North central (Fraser River–Thompson River)
Sleeping Beauty Mountain Provincial Park	PP	Kitimat-Stikine	298	740	2004	Northwest (Skeena River)
Slim Creek Provincial Park	PP	Fraser-Fort George	506	1,250	2000	North central (Fraser River headwaters)
Small Inlet Marine Provincial Park	PP	Strathcona	878	2,170	1996	Vancouver Island (Discovery Islands)
Small River Caves Provincial Park	PP	Fraser-Fort George	1,818	4,490	2000	North central (Fraser River headwaters)
Smelt Bay Provincial Park	PP	Strathcona	20	49	1973	Vancouver Island (Discovery Islands)
Smithers Island Conservancy	C	Kitimat-Stikine	56	140	2007	North central (Central Coast)
Smith River Ecological Reserve	ER	Northern Rockies	1,390	3,400	1977	Northeast (Liard River)
Smith River Falls – Fort Halkett Provincial Park	PP, PA	Northern Rockies	254	630	2001	Northeast (Liard River)
Smuggler Cove Marine Provincial Park	PP	Sunshine Coast	185	460	1971	Southwest (South coast)
Snowy Protected Area	PA	Okanagan-Similkameen	25,889	63,970	2001	Southeast (Columbia River–Okanagan River)
Soap Lake Ecological Reserve	ER	Thompson-Nicola	884	2,180	1971	North central (Fraser River–Thompson River)
Solander Island Ecological Reserve	ER	Strathcona	10	25	1971	Vancouver Island
Sooke Mountain Provincial Park	PP*	Capital	450	1,100	1928	Vancouver Island
Sooke Potholes Provincial Park	PP	Capital	7.3	18	1972	Vancouver Island
South Chilcotin Mountains Provincial Park	PP	Squamish-Lillooet	56,796	140,350	2001	North central (Fraser River)
South Texada Island Provincial Park	PP	qathet	900	2,200	1997	Vancouver Island (Texada–Lasqueti Islands)
Sowchea Bay Provincial Park	PP	Bulkley-Nechako	13	32	1989	North central (Fraser River–Nechako River)
Spatsizi Headwaters Provincial Park	PP	Stikine	427	1,060	2001	Northwest (Stikine River)
Spatsizi Plateau Wilderness Provincial Park	PP	Kitimat-Stikine, Stikine	698,659	1,726,420	1975	Northwest (Stikine River)
Spectacle Lake Provincial Park	PP	Cowichan Valley	67	170	1963	Vancouver Island
Spider Lake Provincial Park †	PP	Nanaimo	65	160	1981	Vancouver Island
Spipiyus Provincial Park	PP	Sunshine Coast	2,979	7,360	1999	Southwest (South Coast)
Sproat Lake Provincial Park	PP	Alberni-Clayoquot	43	110	1966	Vancouver Island
Squitty Bay Provincial Park	PP	qathet	52	130	1988	Vancouver Island (Texada–Lasqueti Islands)
St. Mary's Alpine Provincial Park	PP	East Kootenay	9,146	22,600	1973	Southeast (Columbia River–Kootenay River)
Stagleap Provincial Park	PP	Central Kootenay	1,133	2,800	1964	Southeast (Columbia River, Columbia River–Kootenay River)
Stair Creek Conservancy	C	Kitimat-Stikine	932	2,300	2007	Northwest (North coast)
Stamp River Provincial Park	PP	Alberni-Clayoquot	327	810	1997	Vancouver Island
Stawamus Chief Provincial Park	PP, PA	Squamish-Lillooet	530	1,300	1997	Southwest (South coast)
Steelhead Provincial Park	PP	Thompson-Nicola	38	94	1993	North central (Fraser River–Thompson River)
Stein Valley Nlaka'pamux Heritage Park	PP	Thompson-Nicola	107,191	264,870	1995	North central (Fraser River)
Stemwinder Provincial Park	PP	Okanagan-Similkameen	3.6	8.9	1956	Southeast (Columbia River–Okanagan River)
Stikine River Provincial Park	PP	Kitimat-Stikine, Stikine	257,177	635,500	2001	Northwest (Stikine River)
Stone Mountain Provincial Park	PP	Northern Rockies	25,690	63,500	1957	Northeast (Liard River)
Stoyoma Creek Ecological Reserve	ER	Fraser Valley	71	180	1990	Southwest (Fraser River)
Strathcona Provincial Park (Note: Only the southwestern portion of Strathcona Provincial Park is included within Clayoquot Sound Biosphere Reserve.)	PP	Alberni-Clayoquot, Comox Valley, Strathcona	248,669	614,470	1911	Vancouver Island
Strathcona-Westmin Provincial Park	PP*	Strathcona	3,327	8,220	1989	Vancouver Island
Stuart Lake and Stuart Lake Marine Provincial Park	PP	Bulkley-Nechako	570	1,400	1971; 2001	North central (Fraser River–Nechako River)
Stuart River Provincial Park	PP	Bulkley-Nechako, Fraser-Fort George	20,948	51,760	1999	North central (Fraser River–Nechako River)
Sue Channel Provincial Park	PP	Kitimat-Stikine	209	520	2004	Northwest (North coast)
Sugarbowl-Grizzly Den Provincial Park and Protected Area	PP, PA	Fraser-Fort George	24,765	61,200	2000	North central (Fraser River headwaters)
Sukunka Falls Provincial Park	PP	Peace River	360	890	1981	Northeast (Peace River)
Sulphur Passage Provincial Park †	PP	Alberni-Clayoquot	2,232	5,520	1995	Vancouver Island
Summit Lake Provincial Park	PP*	Central Kootenay	5.8	14	1964	Southeast (Columbia River–Kootenay River)
Sunbeam Creek Ecological Reserve	ER	Fraser-Fort George	511	1,260	1972	North central (Fraser River headwaters)
Sun-Oka Beach Provincial Park	PP	Okanagan-Similkameen	30	74	1969	Southeast (Columbia River–Okanagan River)
Surge Narrows Provincial Park	PP	Strathcona	515	1,270	1996	Vancouver Island (Discovery Islands)
Sup̓itsaqtuʔis Conservancy	C	Alberni-Clayoquot	1,272	3,140	2024	Vancouver Island
Sustut Provincial Park and Protected Area	PP, PA	Stikine	77,279	190,960	2001	Northwest (Skeena River)
Sutherland River Provincial Park and Protected Area	PP, PA	Bulkley-Nechako	18,394	45,450	2001	Northwest (Skeena River)
Sutton Pass Ecological Reserve	ER	Alberni-Clayoquot	5	12	1978	Vancouver Island
Swan Creek Protected Area	PA	Kitimat-Stikine	266	660	2005	Northwest (Skeena River)
Swan Lake Provincial Park	PP	Peace River	82	200	1936	Northeast (Peace River)
Swan Lake/Kispiox River Provincial Park	PP	Kitimat-Stikine	62,255	153,840	1996	Northwest (Skeena River, Nass River)
sw̓iw̓s Provincial Park (Haynes Point)	PP	Okanagan-Similkameen	38	94	1939	Southeast (Columbia River–Okanagan River)
Sx̱ótsaqel/Chilliwack Lake Provincial Park	PP	Fraser Valley	9,258	22,880	1973	Southwest (Fraser River)
Sydney Inlet Provincial Park †	PP	Alberni-Clayoquot	2,774	6,850	1995	Vancouver Island
Syringa Provincial Park	PP	Central Kootenay	4,499	11,120	1968	Southeast (Columbia River)
Tā Ch'ilā Provincial Park	PP	Stikine	4,597	11,360	1965	Northeast (Liard River)
Tacheeda Lakes Ecological Reserve	ER	Fraser-Fort George	526	1,300	1972	Northeast (Peace River)
Tahsish-Kwois Provincial Park	PP	Strathcona	10,987	27,150	1995	Vancouver Island
Tahsish River Ecological Reserve	ER	Strathcona	87	210	1998	Vancouver Island
Takla Lake Ecological Reserve	ER	Bulkley-Nechako	240	590	1972	North central (Fraser River–Nechako River)
Takla Lake Marine Provincial Park	PP	Bulkley-Nechako	550	1,400	1993	North central (Fraser River–Nechako River)
Taku River/T'aḵú Téiú' Conservancy	C	Stikine	80,465	198,830	2012	Northwest (Taku River)
Tantalus Provincial Park	PP	Squamish-Lillooet	11,432	28,250	1998	Southwest (South coast)
Tarahne Provincial Park	PP*	Stikine	3.4	8.4	1974	Northwest (Yukon River)
Tatlatui Provincial Park	PP	Peace River	105,829	261,510	1973	Northeast (Peace River)
Tatshenshini-Alsek Provincial Park *	PP	Stikine	947,026	2,340,150	1993	Northwest (Alsek River)
Taweel Provincial Park	PP	Thompson-Nicola	4,393	10,860	1996	North central (Fraser River–Thompson River)
Taylor Arm Provincial Park	PP	Alberni-Clayoquot	71	180	1979	Vancouver Island
Taylor Landing Provincial Park	PP	Peace River	2.4	5.9	1978	Northeast (Peace River)
Teakerne Arm Provincial Park	PP	Strathcona	128	320	1989	Vancouver Island (Discovery Islands)
Ten Mile Lake Provincial Park	PP	Cariboo	343	850	1962	North central (Fraser River–Quesnel River)
Ten Mile Point Ecological Reserve	ER	Capital	15	37	1975	Vancouver Island
Tetrahedron Provincial Park	PP	Sunshine Coast	6,000	15,000	1995	Southwest (South Coast)
Thinahtea Protected Area	PA	Northern Rockies	20,379	50,360	2001	Northeast (Liard River)
Thorsen Creek Conservancy	C	Central Coast	8,504	21,010	2008	North central (Central Coast)
Three Sisters Lake Provincial Park	PP	Fraser-Fort George	968	2,390	2000	North central (Fraser River)
Thulme Falls Conservancy	C	North Coast	64	160	2008	Northwest (North coast)
Thunderbird's Nest (T'iitsk'in Paawats) Protected Area	PA	Alberni-Clayoquot	2,338	5,780	2011	Vancouver Island
Thunder Hill Provincial Park	PP	East Kootenay	44	110	1960	Southeast (Columbia River)
Thurston Bay Marine Provincial Park	PP	Strathcona	531	1,310	1970	Vancouver Island (Discovery Islands)
Titetown Provincial Park	PP	Cariboo	1,070	2,600	2013	North central (Fraser River)
Tlall Heritage Site/Conservancy	C	North Coast	16,231	40,110	2009	Northwest (North coast–Haida Gwaii)
ƛułp̓ic Conservancy	C	Alberni-Clayoquot	1,168	2,890	2024	Vancouver Island
Toad River Hot Springs Provincial Park	PP	Northern Rockies	423	1,050	1999	Northeast (Liard River)
Todagin South Slope Provincial Park	PP	Kitimat-Stikine	3,557	8,790	2001	Northwest (Stikine River)
Top of the World Provincial Park	PP	East Kootenay	8,790	21,700	1973	Southeast (Columbia River–Kootenay River)
Topley Landing Provincial Park	PP	Bulkley-Nechako	12	30	1964	Northwest (Skeena River)
Torkelsen Lake Ecological Reserve	ER	Bulkley-Nechako, Kitimat-Stikine	182	450	1975	Northwest (Skeena River)
Tow Hill Ecological Reserve	ER	North Coast	519	1,280	1971	Northwest (North coast–Haida Gwaii)
Tranquil Creek Provincial Park †	PP	Alberni-Clayoquot	298	740	1995	Vancouver Island
Tranquille Ecological Reserve	ER	Thompson-Nicola	235	580	1971	North central (Fraser River–Thompson River)
Trembleur Lake Provincial Park	PP	Bulkley-Nechako	57	140	2001	North central (Fraser River–Nechako River)
Trepanier Provincial Park	PP	Central Okanagan	2,884	7,130	2001	Southeast (Columbia River–Okanagan River)
Trial Islands Ecological Reserve	ER	Capital	14	35	1990	Vancouver Island (Gulf Islands)
Tribune Bay Provincial Park	PP	Comox Valley	95	230	1978	Vancouver Island (Denman–Hornby Islands)
Trout Creek Ecological Reserve	ER	Okanagan-Similkameen	75	190	1971	Southeast (Columbia River–Okanagan River)
Troup Passage Conservancy	C	Central Coast	2,617	6,470	2008	North central (Central Coast)
Tsa-Latĺ/Smokehouse Conservancy	C	Central Coast	37,886	93,620	2006	North central (Central Coast)
Tŝi ʔEẑɨsh Ecological Reserve	ER	Cariboo	72	180	1974	North central (Fraser River–Chilcotin River)
Tsʼilʔos Provincial Park	PP	Cariboo	233,240	576,300	1994	North central (Fraser River–Chilcotin River)
Tsintsunko Lakes Provincial Park	PP	Thompson-Nicola	353	870	1996	North central (Fraser River–Thompson River)
Tsitika Mountain Ecological Reserve	ER	Mount Waddington	554	1,370	1989	Vancouver Island
Tsitika River Ecological Reserve	ER	Mount Waddington	110	270	1989	Vancouver Island
Tsútswecw Provincial Park	PP	Columbia-Shuswap	1,073	2,650	1977	North central (Fraser River–Thompson River)
Tudyah Lake Provincial Park	PP	Fraser-Fort George	56	140	1981	Northeast (Peace River)
Tunkwa Provincial Park	PP	Thompson-Nicola	5,138	12,700	1996	North central (Fraser River–Thompson River)
Tutshi Lake/T'ooch' Áayi Conservancy	C	Stikine	19,640	48,500	2012	Northwest (Yukon River)
Tuya Mountains Provincial Park	PP	Stikine	18,001	44,480	2001	Northwest (Stikine River)
Tweedsmuir North Provincial Park and Protected Area	PP, PA	Bulkley-Nechako	446,107	1,102,350	1938	Northwest (Skeena River)
Tweedsmuir South Provincial Park	PP	Bulkley-Nechako, Cariboo, Central Coast, Mount Waddington	989,616	2,445,390	1938	North central (Central Coast, Fraser River–Nechako River)
Tyhee Lake Provincial Park	PP	Bulkley-Nechako	39	96	1956	Northwest (Skeena River)
Ugʷiwa'/Cape Caution Conservancy	C	Central Coast, Mount Waddington	25,685	63,470	2007	North central (Central Coast)
Ugʷiwa'/Cape Caution–Blunden Bay Conservancy	C	Central Coast	331	820	2007	North central (Central Coast)
Unaacuł-Ḥiłsyakƛis Conservancy	C	Alberni-Clayoquot	12,104	29,910	2024	Vancouver Island
Uncha Mountain Red Hills Provincial Park	PP	Bulkley-Nechako	9,421	23,280	2001	North central (Fraser River–Nechako River)
Union Passage Marine Provincial Park	PP	North Coast	1,446	3,570	1993	Northwest (North coast)
Upper Adams River Provincial Park	PP	Thompson-Nicola	5,868	14,500	1996	North central (Fraser River–Thompson River)
Upper Elaho Valley Conservancy	C	Squamish-Lillooet	10,253	25,340	2008	Southwest (South coast, Fraser River–Lillooet River)
Upper Gladys River/Watsíx Deiyi Conservancy	C	Stikine	56,358	139,260	2012	
Upper Kimsquit River Conservancy	C	Central Coast	10,588	26,160	2008	North central (Central Coast)
Upper Lillooet Provincial Park	PP	Squamish-Lillooet	19,996	49,410	1997	Southwest (Fraser River–Lillooet River)
Upper Raush Protected Area	PA	Fraser-Fort George	5,582	13,790	2001	North central (Fraser River headwaters)
Upper Rogers kólii7 Conservancy	C	Fraser Valley, Thompson-Nicola	3,605	8,910	2008	Southwest (Fraser River–Lillooet River)
Upper Seymour River Provincial Park	PP	Columbia-Shuswap	10,672	26,370	2001	North central (Fraser River–Thompson River)
Upper Shuswap River Ecological Reserve	ER	North Okanagan	90	220	1975	North central (Fraser River–Thompson River)
Upper Soo Conservancy	C	Squamish-Lillooet	11,306	27,940	2009	Southwest (Fraser River–Lillooet River)
Upper Violet Creek Provincial Park	PP	North Okanagan	123	300	2004	North central (Fraser River–Thompson River)
Valhalla Provincial Park	PP	Central Kootenay	50,060	123,700	1983	Southeast (Columbia River–Kootenay River)
Vance Creek Ecological Reserve	ER	North Okanagan	49	120	1972	North central (Fraser River–Thompson River)
Vargas Island Provincial Park †	PP	Alberni-Clayoquot	5,805	14,340	1995	Vancouver Island
Vaseux Lake Provincial Park	PP	Okanagan-Similkameen	11.5	28	1956	Southeast (Columbia River–Okanagan River)
Vaseux Protected Area	PA	Okanagan-Similkameen	2,015	4,980	2001	Southeast (Columbia River–Okanagan River)
Victor Lake Provincial Park	PP	Columbia-Shuswap	14.7	36	1961	North central (Fraser River–Thompson River)
Vladimir J. Krajina Ecological Reserve	ER	North Coast	9,174	22,670	1973	Northwest (North coast–Haida Gwaii)
Wahkash Point Conservancy	C	Mount Waddington	189	470	2007	Southwest (South coast)
Waʔuus Č̓aʔakm̓inḥ Conservancy	C	Alberni-Clayoquot	52	130	2024	Vancouver Island
Wakeman Estuary Conservancy	C	Mount Waddington	304	750	2008	Southwest (South coast)
Wakes Cove Provincial Park	PP	Cowichan Valley	205	510	2002	Vancouver Island (Gulf Islands)
Wales Harbour Conservancy	C	Kitimat-Stikine	666	1,650	2008	Northwest (North coast)
Walhachin Oxbows Provincial Park	PP	Thompson-Nicola	37	91	1997	North central (Fraser River–Thompson River)
Wallace Island Marine Provincial Park	PP	Capital	89	220	1990	Vancouver Island (Gulf Islands)
Walloper Lake Provincial Park	PP	Thompson-Nicola	55	140	1987	North central (Fraser River–Thompson River)
Walsh Cove Provincial Park	PP	Strathcona	85	210	1989	Vancouver Island (Discovery Islands)
Wanačas-Hiłḥuuʔis Conservancy	C	Alberni-Clayoquot	5,366	13,260	2024	Vancouver Island
Wap Creek Provincial Park	PP	North Okanagan	328	810	2008	North central (Fraser River–Thompson River)
Wapiti Lake Provincial Park	PP	Peace River	16,809	41,540	2000	Northeast (Peace River)
Wardner Provincial Park	PP	East Kootenay	4	9.9	1977	Southeast (Columbia River–Kootenay River)
Wasa Lake Provincial Park	PP	East Kootenay	154	380	1955	Southeast (Columbia River–Kootenay River)
W̓aw̓aƛ/Seymour Estuary Conservancy	C	Mount Waddington	326	810	2007	Southwest (South coast)
Weewanie Hot Springs Provincial Park	PP	Kitimat-Stikine	35	86	2004	Northwest (North coast)
Wells Gray Provincial Park	PP	Cariboo, Thompson-Nicola	541,516	1,338,120	1939	North central (Fraser River–Thompson River)
Wendle Provincial Park	PP*	Cariboo	259	640	1941	North central (Fraser River headwaters)
West Arm Provincial Park	PP	Central Kootenay	26,199	64,740	1995	Southeast (Columbia River–Kootenay River)
West Lake Provincial Park	PP	Fraser-Fort George	256	630	1981	North central (Fraser River–Nechako River)
West Shawnigan Lake Provincial Park	PP	Cowichan Valley	10	25	1979	Vancouver Island
West Twin Provincial Park and Protected Area	PP, PA	Fraser-Fort George	31,451	77,720	2000	North central (Fraser River headwaters)
Westwick Lake Ecological Reserve	ER	Cariboo	39	96	1972	North central (Fraser River)
Weymer Creek Provincial Park	PP	Strathcona	316	780	1996	Vancouver Island
Whaleboat Island Marine Provincial Park	PP	Cowichan Valley	11	27	1981	Vancouver Island (Gulf Islands)
Whipsaw Creek Ecological Reserve	ER	Okanagan-Similkameen	32	79	1971	Southeast (Columbia River–Okanagan River)
Whiskers Point Provincial Park	PP	Fraser-Fort George	116	290	1956	Northeast (Peace River)
White Lake Grasslands Protected Area	PA	Okanagan-Similkameen	3,741	9,240	2001	Southeast (Columbia River–Okanagan River)
White Lake Provincial Park	PP	Columbia-Shuswap	266	660	1965	North central (Fraser River–Thompson River)
White Pelican Provincial Park	PP	Cariboo	2,762	6,830	1971	North central (Fraser River–Chilcotin River)
White Ridge Provincial Park	PP	Strathcona	1,386	3,420	1995	Vancouver Island
White River Provincial Park	PP	Strathcona	72	180	1996	Vancouver Island
Whiteswan Lake Provincial Park	PP	East Kootenay	1,994	4,930	1978	Southeast (Columbia River–Kootenay River)
Williams Creek Ecological Reserve	ER	Kitimat-Stikine	699	1,730	1985	Northwest (Skeena River)
Wilkinson-Wright Bay Conservancy	C	Bulkley-Nechako	1,664	4,110	2008	Northwest (Skeena River)
Willison Creek – Nelson Lake/Sít' Héeni Conservancy	C	Stikine	10,300	25,000	2012	Northwest (Yukon River)
Windermere Lake Provincial Park	PP	East Kootenay	220	540	1999	Southeast (Columbia River)
Winter Inlet Conservancy	C	Kitimat-Stikine	30	74	2008	Northwest (North coast)
Wire Cache Provincial Park	PP	Thompson-Nicola	57	140	1996	North central (Fraser River–Thompson River)
Wistaria Provincial Park	PP	Bulkley-Nechako	40	99	1981	North central (Fraser River–Nechako River)
Wood Mountain Ski Provincial Park	PP*	Comox Valley	97	240	1966	Vancouver Island
Woodworth Lake Conservancy	C	North Coast	4,436	10,960	2008	Northwest (North coast)
Woodley Range Ecological Reserve	ER	Cowichan Valley	166	410	1996	Vancouver Island
Woss Lake Provincial Park	PP	Mount Waddington	6,634	16,390	1995	Vancouver Island
Wrinkly Face Provincial Park	PP	Central Okanagan	43	110	2004	Southeast (Columbia River–Okanagan River)
Xʷak̓ʷəʔnaxdəʔma/Stafford Estuary Conservancy	C	Strathcona	742	1,830	2007	Southwest (South coast)
Yaaguun G̱andlaay Heritage Site/Conservancy	C	North Coast	2,689	6,640	2008	Northwest (North coast–Haida Gwaii)
Yaaguun Suu Heritage Site/Conservancy	C	North Coast	7,970	19,700	2008	Northwest (North coast–Haida Gwaii)
Yahk Provincial Park	PP	Central Kootenay	11	27	1956	Southeast (Columbia River–Kootenay River)
Yale Garry Oak Ecological Reserve	ER	Fraser Valley	12	30	1998	Southwest (Fraser River)
Yalakom Provincial Park	PP	Squamish-Lillooet, Thompson-Nicola	8,941	22,090	2010	North central (Fraser River)
Yard Creek Provincial Park	PP	Columbia-Shuswap	175	430	1956	North central (Fraser River–Thompson River)
Yellow Point Bog Ecological Reserve	ER	Cowichan Valley	137	340	2004	Vancouver Island
Zumtela Bay Conservancy	C	North Coast	49	120	2008	Northwest (North coast)
ʔaʔukmin Conservancy	C	Alberni-Clayoquot	11,267	27,840	2024	Vancouver Island
ʔuuʔinmitis Conservancy	C	Alberni-Clayoquot	22,880	56,500	2024	Vancouver Island

== Former provincial parks ==
This list includes provincial parks that were cancelled. Provincial parks that were cancelled for the purpose of moving the land into a different provincial park are not included. While some provincial parks were deleted as they were deemed to be not suitable for park purposes, most of the parks were deleted so they could be transferred to a municipality or regional district to be local or regional parks. In 2004 several provincial parks were moved into the federal Gulf Islands National Park; likewise a few provincial parks were moved into the Pacific Rim National Park and Gwaii Haanas National Park when those federal parks were established.

Name of former park	Area	Date est'd	Date deleted	Location	Note
Alta Lake Wayside Park	0.8 hectares (2.0 acres)	1969	1976	Southwest (Lillooet)	Transferred to Resort Municipality of Whistler
Andy Bailey Provincial Park	196 hectares (480 acres)	1979	2004	Northeast (Liard River)	Transferred to Northern Rockies Regional Municipality, named changed from Jackfish Lake Recreation Area in 1982
Anthony Island Provincial Park	140 hectares (350 acres)	1957	1988	Northwest (North Coast)	Transferred to Gwaii Haanas National Park
Antlers Beach Provincial Park	8 hectares (20 acres)	1955	1991	Southeast (Okanagan)	Transferred to Regional District of Central Okanagan
Apex Mountain Park	140 hectares (350 acres)	1961	1980	Southeast (Similkameen)	Converted into a Recreation Area in 1980 and cancelled in 2001
Appledale Park		1959	1991	Southeast (Slocan River)	
Art Fraser (Fort Nelson Centennial) Park	5.2 hectares (13 acres)	1964	1986	Northeast (Liard River)	Transferred to Town of Fort Nelson
Barkerville Provincial Park	227 hectares (560 acres)	1959	2012	North central (Fraser River headwaters)	Re-designated as a "Provincial heritage property" under the Heritage Conservation Act and placed under the management of the Barkerville Heritage Trust
Beaumont Marine Park	34 hectares (84 acres)	1963	2004	Vancouver Island (Gulf Islands)	Transferred to Gulf Islands National Park Reserve
Beaver Harbour Park	40 hectares (99 acres)	1958	1970	Vancouver Island	Transferred to District of Port Hardy
Blenkin Memorial Park	16 hectares (40 acres)	1962	1989	Vancouver Island (Discovery Islands)	Transferred to Comox-Strathcona Regional District
Blessing's Grave Historic Park	0.5 hectares (1.2 acres)	1973	1988	North central (Fraser River headwaters)	Re-designated as a "Provincial heritage property" under the Heritage Conservation Act
Blue River Park	97 hectares (240 acres)	1962	1989	North central (Fraser River–Thompson River)	
Brentwood Bay Provincial Park		1938	1956	Vancouver Island (Saanich peninsula)	Transferred to District of Central Saanich
Bright Angel Park	22 hectares (54 acres)	1958	2016	Vancouver Island	Transferred to Cowichan Valley Regional District
Brilliant Terrace Park	121 ha (300 acres)	1959	1992	Southeast (Kootenay)	
Brothers Memorial Park	6 hectares (15 acres)	1951	1974	Southwest (South Coast)	Transferred to Village of Gibsons
Buck Lake Park	28 hectares (69 acres)	1963	1981	North central	
Cabbage Island Marine Provincial Park		1978	2004	Vancouver Island (Gulf Islands)	Transferred to Gulf Islands National Park Reserve
Canal Flats Provincial Park	6 hectares (15 acres)	1981	2010	Southeast (Columbia River)	Transferred to Village of Canal Flats, renamed Tilley Memorial Park
Cayoosh Park	4 hectares (9.9 acres)	1962	1986	North central (Fraser River)	
Celista Park	2 hectares (4.9 acres)	1958	1997	North central (Fraser River–Thompson River)	Management contracted to North Shuswap Community Association
Chaster Park	2 hectares (4.9 acres)	1970	1992	Southwest (South Coast)	Transferred to Sunshine Coast Regional District
China Creek Park	24 hectares (59 acres)	1967	1986	Vancouver Island	Transferred to Alberni-Clayoquot Regional District
Christie Memorial Provincial Park	3 hectares (7.4 acres)	1965	2013	Southeast (Okanagan)	Transferred to Regional District of Okanagan-Similkameen
Clinton Creek Park	0.6 hectares (1.5 acres)	1962	1964	North central (Fraser River)	Transferred to Village of Clinton
Colleymount Community Park	10.5 hectares (26 acres)	1955	1983	North central	
Columbia Village Historic Park	4.8 hectares (12 acres)	1972	1980	Southeast (Columbia River)	Transferred to Columbia-Shuswap Regional District
Cottonwood House Historic Park	10.7 hectares (26 acres)	1963	1999	North central (Fraser River headwaters)	Re-designated as a "Provincial heritage property" under the Heritage Conservation Act and placed under the management of the Barkerville Heritage Trust
Cottonwood Lake Park	8 hectares (20 acres)	1960	1982	Southeast (Kootenay)	Transferred to Regional District of Central Kootenay
Crescent Beach Provincial Park	99 hectares (240 acres)	1938	1953	Southwest (Lower Mainland)	Transferred to Municipality of Surrey
D'Arcy Island Marine Park	84 hectares (210 acres)	1967	2004	Vancouver Island (Gulf Islands)	Transferred to Gulf Islands National Park Reserve
Deadman Lake Provincial Park	1.8 hectares (4.4 acres)	1940	1983	Southeast (Okanagan)	Converted to a Recreation Area
Dutch Lake Park	0.7 hectares (1.7 acres)	1961	1978	North central (Fraser River–Thompson River)	Transferred to Thompson-Nicola Regional District, later incorporated into District of Clearwater
Elizabeth Lake Park	117 hectares (290 acres)	1962	1968	Southeast (Kootenay)	Transferred to City of Cranbrook
Elk River Provincial Park		1940	1976	Southeast (Kootenay)	Transferred to City of Fernie
Fort McLeod Historic Park	3 hectares (7.4 acres)	1971	1999	Northeast (Peace River)	Re-designated as a "Provincial heritage property" under the Heritage Conservation Act
Fort St. John Historic Park	2 hectares (4.9 acres)	1971	1988	Northeast (Peace River)	
Fort Steele Historic Park	150 hectares (370 acres)	1961	1988	Southeast (Kootenay)	Re-designated as a "Provincial heritage property" under the Heritage Conservation Act and placed under the management of The Friends of Fort Steele Society
Freeman King Park	20 hectares (49 acres)	1968	1981	Vancouver Island (Saanich peninsula)	Transferred to Capital Regional District, forms part of Francis/King Regional Park
Gardom Lake Park	24 hectares (59 acres)	1961	1997	North central (Fraser River–Thompson River)	
Gold River Park	31 hectares (77 acres)	1974	1986	Vancouver Island	
Golden Community Park		1952	1964	Southeast (Columbia River)	Transferred to Village of Golden, developed for various uses
Gun Lake Park	4.7 hectares (12 acres)	1963	1988	Southwest (Lillooet)	
Harwood (Shelter) Point Park	31 hectares (77 acres)	1959	1972	Vancouver Island (Texada–Lasqueti Islands)	Transferred to Powell River Regional District
Haslam Lake Park	16 hectares (40 acres)	1962	1972	Southwest (South coast)	Transferred to Powell River Regional District
Hirsch Creek Park		1958	1981	Northwest	Transferred to District of Kitimat
Helmcken Centennial Park	2.5 hectares (6.2 acres)	1958	1972	Vancouver Island (Saanich peninsula)	Transferred to Capital Regional District, later incorporated into Town of View Royal
Isle-de-Lis Marine Provincial Park		1978	2004	Vancouver Island (Gulf Islands)	Transferred to Gulf Islands National Park Reserve
Ivy Green Provincial Park	23 hectares (57 acres)	1949	1984	Vancouver Island (Cowichan Valley)	Transferred to the Stz'uminus First Nation
James Johnstone Park	1.7 hectares (4.2 acres)	1960	1987	Southeast (Kootenay)	Transferred to Regional District of Central Kootenay
Kalamoir Park		1959	1983	Southeast (Okanagan)	Transferred to Regional District of Central Okanagan
Kawkawa Lake Park	6.5 hectares (16 acres)	1966	1994	Southwest (Lower Mainland)	Transferred to District of Hope
Kelowna Provincial Park		1955	1961	Southeast (Okanagan)	Transferred to City of Kelowna
Kersey Lake Park	12.5 hectares (31 acres)	1969	1988	North central	
Kledo Creek Provincial Park	6 hectares (15 acres)	1963	2006	Northeast (Liard River)	The BC Ministry of the Environment deemed that the six-hectare park did "not add to the ecological or recreational portfolio of the BC Parks system" and therefore, returned it to the Ministry of Agriculture and Lands for administration.
Kuskonook Park	6 hectares (15 acres)	1961	1980	Southeast (Kootenay)	
Lakeview Park	70 ha (170 acres)	1959	1977	Vancouver Island (Cowichan Valley)	Transferred to Village of Lake Cowichan
Langford Centennial Park	2.7 ha (6.7 acres)	1961	1977	Vancouver Island (Saanich peninsula)	Transferred to Capital Regional District, later incorporated into City of Langford
Lardeau Provincial Park	11 ha (27 acres)	1958	1992	Southeast (Kootenay)	
Liard River Provincial Park	730,000 ha (1,800,000 acres)	1944	1949	Northeast (Liard River)	
Little Shuswap Lake Provincial Park	1.2 ha (3.0 acres)	1942	1970	North central (Shuswap)	Transferred to Village of Chase
Long Lake Provincial Park		1957	1977	Vancouver Island (Nanaimo)	
Manitou Provincial Park		1940	1983	Southeast (Okanagan)	Transferred to Regional District of Okanagan-Similkameen
Mara Point Park	3.9 ha (9.6 acres)	1962	2010	Southeast (Shuswap)	
Mara Recreation Provincial Park	6 hectares (15 acres)	1938	1956	Southeast (Shuswap)	
Matheson Lake Provincial Park	65 hectares (160 acres)	1956	1994	Vancouver Island	Transferred to Capital Regional District
McBride Community Park	28 hectares (69 acres)	1955	1976	North central (Fraser River headwaters)	Transferred to Village of McBride
Mcdonald Park	10 hectares (25 acres)	1948	2004	Vancouver Island (Saanich peninsula)	Transferred to Gulf Islands National Park Reserve
Meadowland Park	5.3 hectares (13 acres)	1958	1981	Southwest (Lower Mainland)	
Medicine Bowls Provincial Park	12 hectares (30 acres)	1940	1945	Vancouver Island (Comox Valley)	Transferred to City of Courtenay
Mission Beach Park	1.3 hectares (3.2 acres)	1962	1978	Southeast (Okanagan)	Transferred to City of Kelowna
Mission Flats Park	3.6 hectares (8.9 acres)	1967	1978	North central (Fraser River–Thompson River)	Transferred to City of Kamloops
Mollice Lake Park	39 hectares (96 acres)	1963	1983	North central (Fraser River–Nechako River)	
Moose Heights Park	50 hectares (120 acres)	1967	1991	North central (Fraser River)	
Mouat Provincial Park	23 ha (57 acres)	1961	1997	Vancouver Island (Salt Spring Island)	Transferred to Capital Regional District
Mount Bruce Provincial Park	194 hectares (480 acres)	1938	1955	Vancouver Island (Salt Spring Island)	
Myrtle Rocks Park	23 hectares (57 acres)	1968	1972	Southwest (South coast)	Transferred to Powell River Regional District
Nakusp Hot Springs Provincial Park		1925	1990	Southeast (Columbia River)	Transferred to Village of Nakusp
Nakusp Recreation Provincial Park	15.8 hectares (39 acres)	1931	1976	Southeast (Columbia River)	Transferred to Village of Nakusp
Nazko Community Park	8 hectares (20 acres)	1963	1981	North central (Fraser River)	
Newstead Park	0.08 hectares (0.20 acres)	1951	1972	Vancouver Island (Saanich peninsula)	Transferred to Capital Regional District, later incorporated into Town of View Royal
Oliver Provincial Park		1937	1959	Southeast (Okanagan)	Transferred to Village of Oliver
Oliver Lake Park	4.4 hectares (11 acres)	1960	1987	Northwest (Prince Rupert)	
Palm Beach Park	3.2 ha (7.9 acres)	1959	1972	Southwest (South coast)	Transferred to Powell River Regional District
Pass Creek Park	21 hectares (52 acres)	1961	1970	Southeast (Kootenay)	Transferred to Regional District of Central Kootenay
Peace Island Park	41 hectares (100 acres)	1964	1976	Northeast (Peace River)	Transferred to Village of Taylor
Pearse (Westwold) Park	1.3 hectares (3.2 acres)	1974	1992	North central (Fraser River–Thompson River)	
Pemberton Park	30 ha (74 acres)	1960	1983	Southwest (Lillooet)	Transferred to Village of Pemberton, renamed One Mile Lake Park
Princess Margaret Marine Provincial Park	194 ha (480 acres)	1967	2004	Vancouver Island (Gulf Islands)	Transferred to Gulf Islands National Park Reserve
Princeton Provincial Park		1928	1988	Southeast (Similkameen)	Transferred to Town of Princeton in 1992
Prior Centennial Provincial Park		1958	2004	Vancouver Island (Gulf Islands)	Transferred to Gulf Islands National Park Reserve
Racing River Wayside Park	71 hectares (180 acres)	1970	1988	Northeast (Liard River)	
Rock Creek Park		1963	?	Southeast (Kettle River)	
Roserim Creek Park	8.3 ha (21 acres)	1960	1985	North central (Fraser River–Thompson River)	
Rutland Community Park	2 hectares (4.9 acres)	1964	1978	Southeast (Okanagan)	Transferred to City of Kelowna
Salt Lake Provincial Park		1925	1988	Northwest (North Coast)	
Sicamous Beach Park	9.8 hectares (24 acres)	1961	1997	North central (Fraser River–Thompson River)	Transferred to District of Sicamous
Sidney Spit Marine Park	217 hectares (540 acres)	1961	2004	Vancouver Island (Gulf Islands)	Transferred to Gulf Islands National Park Reserve
Silver Creek Park	16 hectares (40 acres)	1959	1964	Southwest (Lower Mainland)	Transferred to District of Mission
Snootli Creek Park		1968	1985	North central (Central coast)	Transferred to Central Coast Regional District
Spencer Tuck Park	5.1 hectares (13 acres)	1962	1991	Northeast (Peace River)	Transferred to Peace River Regional District
Strombeck Provincial Park	0.3 hectares (0.74 acres)	1933	1981	Northwest (North Coast)	Transferred to federal government
Sudeten Provincial Park	5 hectares (12 acres)	1969	2006	Northeast (Peace River)	Management transferred to Tomslake & District Recreation Commission
Sumas Mountain Provincial Park	183 hectares (450 acres)	1965	2002	Southwest (Lower Mainland)	Transferred to Fraser Valley Regional District
Sunnybrae Provincial Park	24.8 hectares (61 acres)	1975	2006	North central (Fraser River–Thompson River)	Transferred to Columbia-Shuswap Regional District, converted from Recreation Area to Provincial Park in 1989
Sutherland Hills Park		1957	1991	Southeast (Okanagan)	Transferred to Regional District of Central Okanagan
sx̌ʷəx̌ʷnitkʷ (Okanagan Falls) Provincial Park	2.2 hectares (5.4 acres)	1956	2016	Southeast (Okanagan)	Transferred to Osoyoos Indian Band
Terrace Park	1.3 hectares (3.2 acres)	1958	1979	Northwest (Skeena)	Transferred to District of Terrace
Testalinda Provincial Park		1939	1957	Southeast (Okanagan)	
Tetsa River Provincial Park		1980	2004	Northeast (Liard River)	Transferred to Northern Rockies Regional Municipality
Thomas S. Francis Park	64 hectares (160 acres)	1960	1981	Vancouver Island (Saanich peninsula)	Transferred to Capital Regional District, forms part of Francis/King Regional Park
Truman Dagnus Locheed Provincial Park	7 hectares (17 acres)	1973	2013	Southeast (Okanagan)	
Wain Park		1958	1968	Vancouver Island (Saanich peninsula)	Transferred to District of North Saanich
Weaver Creek Park	73 hectares (180 acres)	1964	1983	Southwest (Lower Mainland)	
Westbank Provincial Park		1937	1984	Southeast (Okanagan)	
Westview Provincial Park		1931	1962	Southwest (South coast)	Transferred to District of Powell River
White Rock Provincial Park		1930	1946	Southwest (Lower Mainland)	Transferred to Municipality of Surrey
Wickaninnish Beach Park	125 hectares (310 acres)	1959	1971	Vancouver Island	Transferred to Pacific Rim National Park
Winter Cove Provincial Park	90 hectares (220 acres)	1979	2004	Vancouver Island (Gulf Islands)	Transferred to Gulf Islands National Park Reserve

== See also ==
- List of protected areas of British Columbia
- List of protected areas of Alberta
