= Shuswap River Islands Provincial Park =

Canadian provincial park

- IUCN category II (national park)
- Location within British Columbia
- Interactive map of Shuswap River Islands Provincial Park
- Location: British Columbia, Canada
- Nearest city: Salmon Arm
- Coordinates: 50°33′09″N 118°53′35″W
- Area: 1.85 km^{2} (0.71 sq mi)
- Established: May 17, 2004
- Governing body: BC Parks

Shuswap River Islands Provincial Park is a provincial park in British Columbia, Canada. The park was established as a result of the Okanagan-Shuswap Land and Resource Management Plan. Size: 1.85 km^{2}.
