= Milligan Hills Provincial Park =

Provincial park in British Columbia, Canada

- IUCN category II (national park)
- Location within British Columbia
- Interactive map of Milligan Hills Provincial Park
- Location: British Columbia, Canada
- Nearest city: Fort St. John
- Coordinates: 57°29′34″N 120°13′49″W
- Area: 72.26 km^{2} (27.90 sq mi)
- Established: June 28, 1999
- Governing body: BC Parks

Milligan Hills Provincial Park is a provincial park in British Columbia, Canada, located 150 km (93 mi) northeast of Fort St. John near the border with Alberta.
