= Taweel Provincial Park =

Provincial park in British Columbia

- IUCN category II (national park)
- Location within British Columbia
- Interactive map of Taweel Provincial Park
- Location: British Columbia, Canada
- Nearest city: Clearwater
- Coordinates: 51°38′33″N 120°21′46″W
- Area: 43.93 km^{2} (16.96 sq mi)
- Established: April 30, 1996
- Governing body: BC Parks

Taweel Provincial Park is a provincial park in British Columbia, Canada, located west of the town of Clearwater.
