= Buse Lake Protected Area =

Provincial park in British Columbia, Canada

- IUCN category III (natural monument or feature)
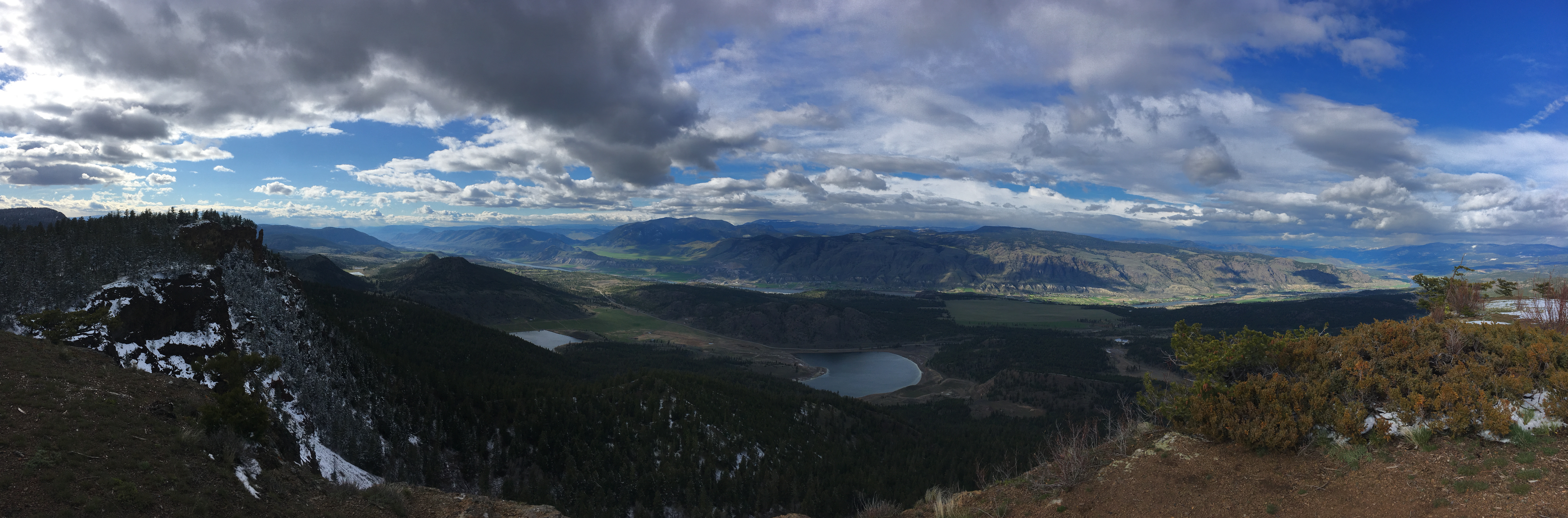
- Buse Lake Protected Area facing north

- Location within British Columbia
- Interactive map of Buse Lake Protected Area
- Location: Kamloops Division Yale Land District, British Columbia, Canada
- Nearest city: Kamloops, BC
- Coordinates: 50°36′53″N 120°01′49″W
- Area: 228 ha (560 acres)
- Established: January 25, 2001
- Governing body: BC Parks

Buse Lake Protected Area, informally known as Buse Lake Provincial Park, is a provincial park in British Columbia, Canada, 23 km east-southeast of Kamloops near Monte Creek. It was created in 2000 as part of the outcome of the Kamloops Landuse and Resource Management Plan (KLRMP) and is 228 hectares in size.
