= Sue Channel Provincial Park =

Provincial park in British Columbia, Canada

- IUCN category II (national park)
- Location within British Columbia
- Interactive map of Sue Channel Provincial Park
- Location: British Columbia, Canada
- Nearest city: Kitimat
- Coordinates: 53°43′37″N 128°50′56″W
- Area: 2.09 km^{2} (0.81 sq mi)
- Established: May 17, 2004
- Governing body: BC Parks

Sue Channel Provincial Park is a provincial park in British Columbia, Canada.
