= Loveland Bay Provincial Park =

Canadian provincial park

- IUCN category II (national park)
- Location within Vancouver Island Location within British Columbia
- Interactive map of Loveland Bay Provincial Park
- Location: British Columbia, Canada
- Nearest city: Campbell River
- Coordinates: 50°03′05″N 125°26′25″W
- Area: 0.3 km^{2} (0.12 sq mi)
- Established: November 21, 1966
- Governing body: BC Parks

Loveland Bay Provincial Park is a provincial park on Vancouver Island, British Columbia, Canada, located on the north side of Campbell Lake, just west of the city of Campbell River.
