= Roberts Memorial Provincial Park =

Provincial pak of British Columbia

- IUCN category II (national park)
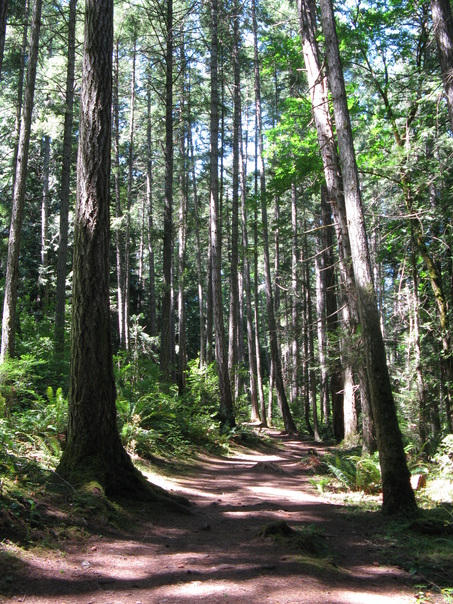
- Panoramic view

- Location within Vancouver Island Location within British Columbia
- Interactive map of Roberts Memorial Provincial Park
- Location: British Columbia, Canada
- Nearest city: Nanaimo
- Coordinates: 49°03′47″N 123°46′33″W
- Area: 0.14 km^{2} (0.054 sq mi)
- Established: May 22, 1980
- Governing body: BC Parks

Roberts Memorial Provincial Park is a 14 ha provincial park in British Columbia, Canada, located 15 km south of Nanaimo.

A cairn at the park head states, "Donated by May Vaughan Roberts in loving memory of her husband, O.D. Roberts and daughter, Joan Roberts Morgan. Established May 22, 1980".

== Gallery ==
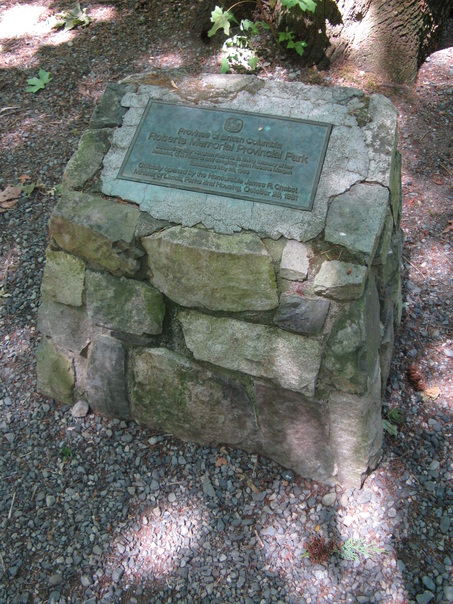
Cairn in Roberts Memorial Provincial Park
