= West Shawnigan Lake Provincial Park =

Provincial park in British Columbia, Canada

- IUCN category II (national park)
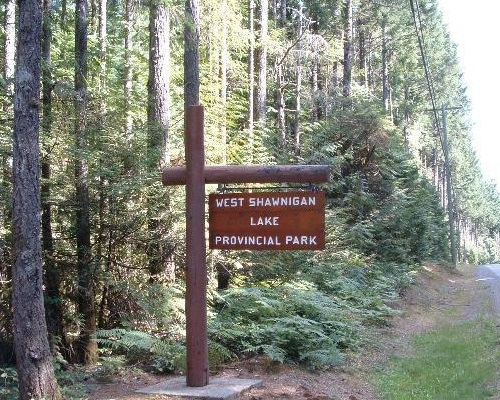
- Welcome sign of West Shawnigan Lake Provincial Park

- Location within Vancouver Island Location within British Columbia Location within Cowichan Valley Regional District
- Interactive map of West Shawnigan Lake Provincial Park
- Location: Cowichan Valley RD, British Columbia, Canada
- Coordinates: 48°38′27″N 123°39′05″W
- Area: 9.7 ha (24 acres)
- Established: February 23, 1979
- Governing body: BC Parks; Cowichan Valley Regional District

West Shawnigan Lake Provincial Park is a provincial park in British Columbia, Canada.
