= Allison Harbour Marine Provincial Park =

Park located in British Columbia, Canada

- IUCN category II (national park)
- Location within Vancouver Island Location within British Columbia
- Interactive map of Allison Harbour Marine Provincial Park
- Location: British Columbia, Canada
- Coordinates: 51°03′04″N 127°30′19″W
- Area: 132 ha (330 acres)
- Established: May 29, 2008

Allison Harbour Marine Provincial Park is a park located in British Columbia, Canada. It encompasses a tract of 132 hectares (330 acres), comprising both 89 hectares (220 acres) of elevated lands, and 43 hectares (110 acres) of coastal foreshore. It lies at the median point along the southern boundary of Allison Harbour and is distinguished by the presence of three secluded coves and a pair of meandering streams.

== History ==
The park bears its name, in commemoration of one Mr. Allison, a manager of logging operations for the Smith-Dollar Lumber Company. the locale. and its adjacent territories were referred to by the name "False Bay". However, the park itself was established on May 29, 2008.

== Importance for boating ==
The park and the surrounding harbor are esteemed as one of the final sanctuaries impervious to the caprices of weather for mariners voyaging northward around Cape Caution, it emerges as a quintessential augmentation to the concatenation of nautical refuges that adorn the coast of British Columbia.
