= Stuart Lake Marine Provincial Park =

Provincial park in the Regional District of Bulkley-Nechako, British Columbia

Stuart Lake Provincial Park
- IUCN category II (national park)
- Location within British Columbia
- Interactive map of Stuart Lake Provincial Park
- Location: British Columbia, Canada
- Nearest city: Fort St. James
- Coordinates: 54°38′54″N 125°00′28″W
- Area: 2.27 km^{2} (0.88 sq mi)
- Established: April 11, 2001
- Governing body: BC Parks

Stuart Lake Marine Provincial Park is a provincial park in British Columbia, Canada.
