= West Lake Provincial Park =

Provincial park in British Columbia, Canada

- IUCN category II (national park)
- Location within British Columbia
- Interactive map of West Lake Provincial Park
- Location: British Columbia, Canada
- Nearest city: Prince George
- Coordinates: 53°44′14″N 122°51′44″W
- Area: 2.56 km^{2} (0.99 sq mi)
- Established: January 30, 1981
- Governing body: BC Parks

West Lake Provincial Park is a provincial park in British Columbia, Canada.
