= Puntchesakut Lake Provincial Park =

Provincial park in British Columbia, Canada

- IUCN category II (national park)
- Location within British Columbia
- Interactive map of Puntchesakut Lake Provincial Park
- Location: British Columbia, Canada
- Nearest city: Quesnel
- Coordinates: 52°59′01″N 122°56′25″W
- Area: 0.38 km^{2} (0.15 sq mi)
- Established: July 26, 1980
- Governing body: BC Parks

Puntchesakut Lake Provincial Park is a provincial park in British Columbia, Canada. It is approximately 16.7m deep and has trout as the main fish source.
