= Morton Lake Provincial Park =

Provincial park in British Columbia, Canada

- IUCN category II (national park)
- Location within Vancouver Island Location within British Columbia
- Interactive map of Morton Lake Provincial Park
- Location: British Columbia, Canada
- Nearest city: Vernon
- Coordinates: 50°07′31″N 125°29′04″W
- Area: 0.74 km^{2} (0.29 sq mi)
- Established: November 28, 1966
- Governing body: BC Parks

Morton Lake Provincial Park is a provincial park in British Columbia, Canada, located on Vancouver Island northwest of the city of Campbell River.
