= List of provincial parks of the Okanagan =

The list of provincial parks of the Okanagan contains the provincial parks located within this geographic region of the province of British Columbia. It includes parks from the three regional districts of Central Okanagan, North Okanagan and Okanagan-Similkameen. These parks are administered by BC Parks under the jurisdiction of the Ministry of Environment and Climate Change Strategy.

== Parks ==
=== Central Okanagan ===
Name	Established	Commons category	Picture	Coordinates
Bear Creek Provincial Park	1988	Bear Creek Provincial Park		49.9306°N 119.521°W
Browne Lake Provincial Park	2004	Browne Lake Provincial Park		49.8242°N 119.198°W
Darke Lake Provincial Park	1968	Darke Lake		49.7333°N 119.867°W
Eneas Lakes Provincial Park	1968			49.75°N 119.933°W
Fintry Provincial Park and Protected Area	2001	Fintry Provincial Park and Protected Area		50.137777777778°N 119.51055555556°W
Myra-Bellevue Provincial Park	2001	Myra-Bellevue Provincial Park		49.78611111°N 119.3875°W
Okanagan Mountain Provincial Park	1973	Okanagan Mountain Provincial Park		49.7167°N 119.633°W
Trepanier Provincial Park	2001	Trepanier Provincial Park		49.914722222222°N 119.85777777778°W
Wrinkly Face Provincial Park	2004	Wrinkly Face Provincial Park		50.04°N 119.311°W

=== North Okanagan ===
Name	Established	Commons category	Picture	Coordinates
Echo Lake Provincial Park	1956			50.2025°N 118.709°W
Ellison Provincial Park	1962			50.1736°N 119.433°W
Kalamalka Lake Provincial Park and Protected Area	1975	Kalamalka Lake Provincial Park and Protected Area		50.2040726°N 119.2836779°W
Kekuli Bay Provincial Park	1990	Kekuli Bay Provincial Park		50.1838094°N 119.3421913°W
Mabel Lake Provincial Park	1972			50.4611°N 118.724°W
Mara Provincial Park	1958	Mara Provincial Park (BC)		50.7167°N 119.033°W
Monashee Provincial Park	1962			50.5167°N 118.25°W
Mount Griffin Provincial Park	2001			50.9317°N 118.563°W
Silver Star Provincial Park	1989			50.375°N 119.083°W
Truman Dagnus Locheed Provincial Park	1973			50.2214°N 119.375°W
Upper Violet Creek Provincial Park	2004			50.65°N 119.1°W

=== Okanagan-Similkameen ===
Name	Established	Commons category	Picture	Coordinates
Allison Lake Provincial Park	1960-07-26			49.6833°N 120.6°W
Bromley Rock Provincial Park	1956-03-10			49.4161°N 120.262°W
Cathedral Provincial Park	1968-05-02	Cathedral Provincial Park		49.076388888889°N 120.17916666667°W
Inkaneep Provincial Park	1956	Inkaneep Provincial Park		49.2264°N 119.542°W
Keremeos Columns Provincial Park	1931-07-31			49.2497°N 119.79°W
Kickininee Provincial Park	1970-03-08			49.55°N 119.633°W
Nickel Plate Provincial Park	1938	Nickel Plate Provincial Park		49.404°N 119.948°W
Okanagan Falls Provincial Park	1956-03-16			49.3331°N 119.586°W
Okanagan Lake Provincial Park	1955-12-29	Okanagan Lake Provincial Park		49.68333333°N 119.72222222°W
Otter Lake Provincial Park				49.5878°N 120.773°W
Skaha Bluffs Provincial Park	1955	Skaha Bluffs Provincial Park		49.4439856°N 119.5807855°W
Stemwinder Provincial Park	1956-03-06			49.371111111111°N 120.13666666667°W
Sun-Oka Beach Provincial Park	1969	Sun-Oka Beach Provincial Park		49.5672°N 119.637°W
Sẁiẁs Provincial Park	1939			49.0153°N 119.453°W
Vaseux Lake Provincial Park				49.3011°N 119.532°W
