= Okanagan =

Region of British Columbia, Canada

Okanagan Okanagan Valley
- Region of British Columbia
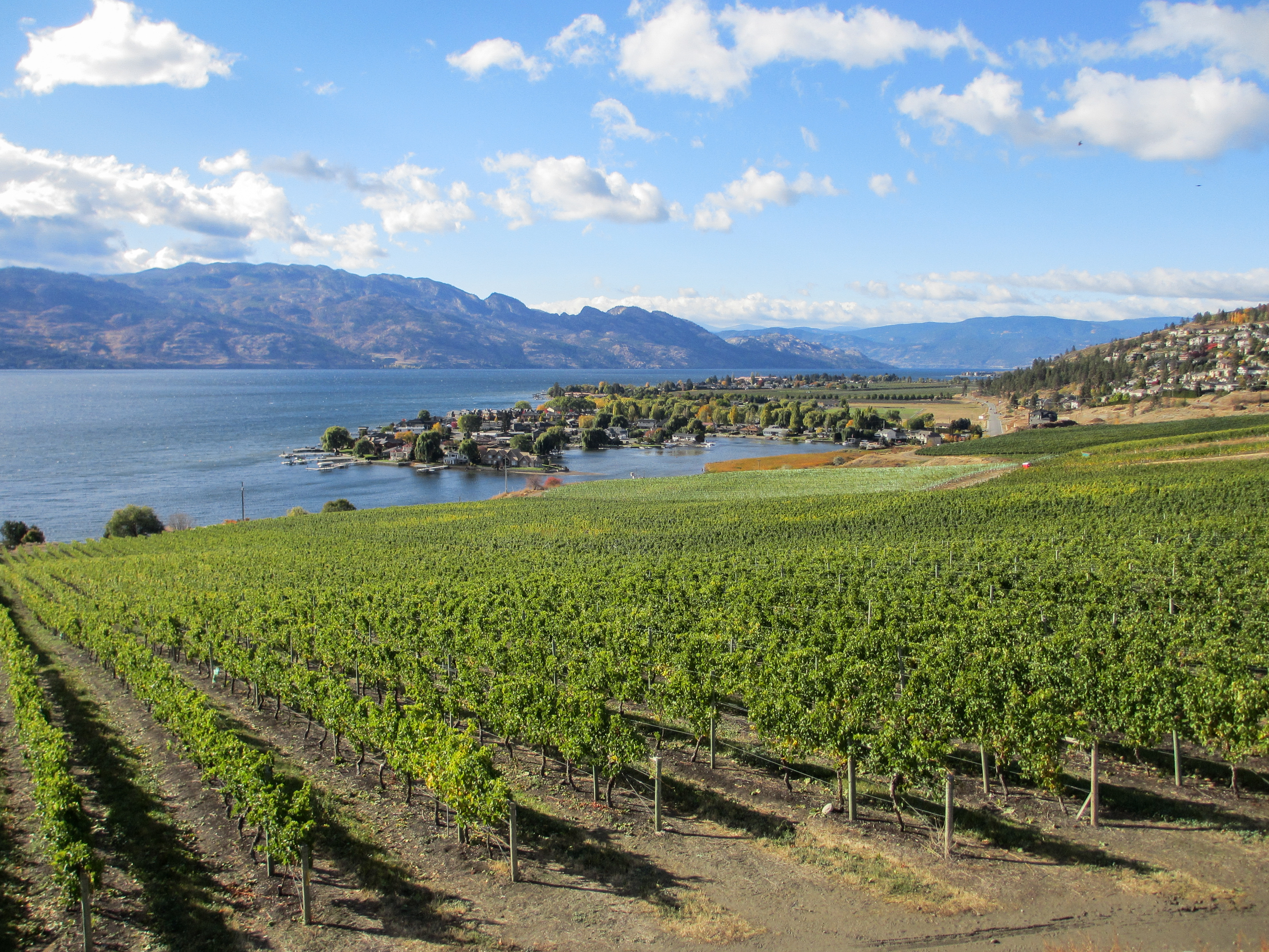
- Vineyards of the central Okanagan Valley

- Location of the Okanagan in British Columbia
- Coordinates: 49°44′52″N 119°43′02″W
- Country: Canada
- Province: British Columbia
- Principal cities: List: Kelowna; Vernon; Penticton; West Kelowna

Area
  - 3 Districts: 20,817 km^{2} (8,037 sq mi)

Population (2023)
  - Total: 439,852
  - Density: 21.1/km^{2} (55/sq mi)
- Time zone: UTC−08:00 (PST)
  - Summer (DST): UTC−07:00 (PDT)
- Postal code prefixes: V
- Area codes: 236, 672, 778, 250

The Okanagan (/ˌoʊkəˈnɑːɡən/ OH-kə-NAH-gən), also called the Okanagan Valley and sometimes the Okanagan Country, is a region in the Canadian province of British Columbia defined by the basin of Okanagan Lake and the Canadian portion of the Okanagan River. It is part of the Okanagan Country, extending into the United States as Okanogan County in north-central Washington. According to the 2016 Canadian census, the region's population is 362,258. The largest populated cities are Kelowna, Penticton, Vernon, and West Kelowna.

The region is known for its sunny climate, dry landscapes, lakeshore communities, and particular lifestyle. The economy is retirement- and commercial-recreation-based, with outdoor activities such as boating and watersports, skiing, and hiking. Agriculture has been focused primarily on fruit orchards, with a recent shift in focus to vineyards and wine.

The region stretches northwards via the Spallumcheen Valley to Sicamous in the Shuswap Country, and reaches south of the Canada–United States border, where it continues as Okanogan County. The Okanagan as a region is sometimes described as including the Boundary, Similkameen, and Shuswap regions, though this is because of proximity and historic and commercial ties with those areas.

== Etymology ==
The name is derived from the Okanagan-language place name ukʷnaqín. An alternative explanation from Washington is ‘People living where you can see the top’, ostensibly of Chopaka Peak in the Lower Similkameen.

== Geography ==
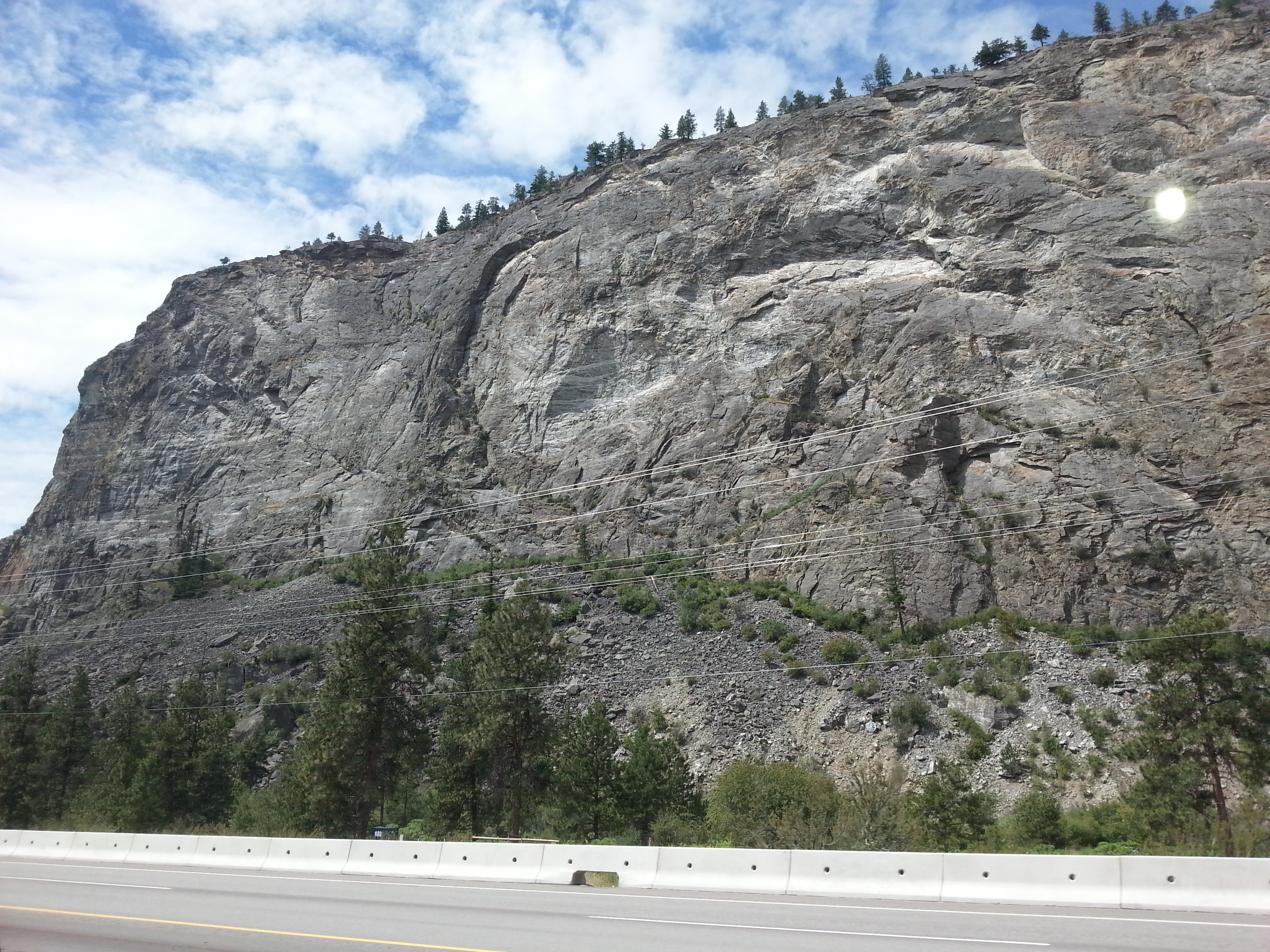
View of McIntyre Bluff from Highway 97

The area was occupied by Pleistocene glaciation, and a widespread mantle of glacial drift covers the underlying bedrock. At the end of the Pleistocene, marginal lakes formed along the sides of the melting ice lobe and streams deposited their loads in them as deltas and accumulations of silt. These accumulations now form the white cliffs that are particularly prominent along the southern end of Okanagan Lake.

Geographic features include:

- Kalamalka Lake
- Mabel Lake
- Mahoney Lake
- Mara Lake
- McIntyre Bluff
- Monashee Mountains
- Mount Boucherie
- Okanagan Highland
- Okanagan Lake
- Okanagan River
- Osoyoos Lake
- Shuswap River
- Skaha Lake
- Swan Lake
- Thompson Plateau
- Tuc-el-nuit Lake
- Vaseux Lake
- Wood Lake

=== Major highways ===
- Highway 97 (Okanagan Highway)
- Highway 3 (Crowsnest Highway)
- Highway 97C (Okanagan Connector)
- Highway 33
- Highway 6
- Highway 97A

=== Provincial parks ===
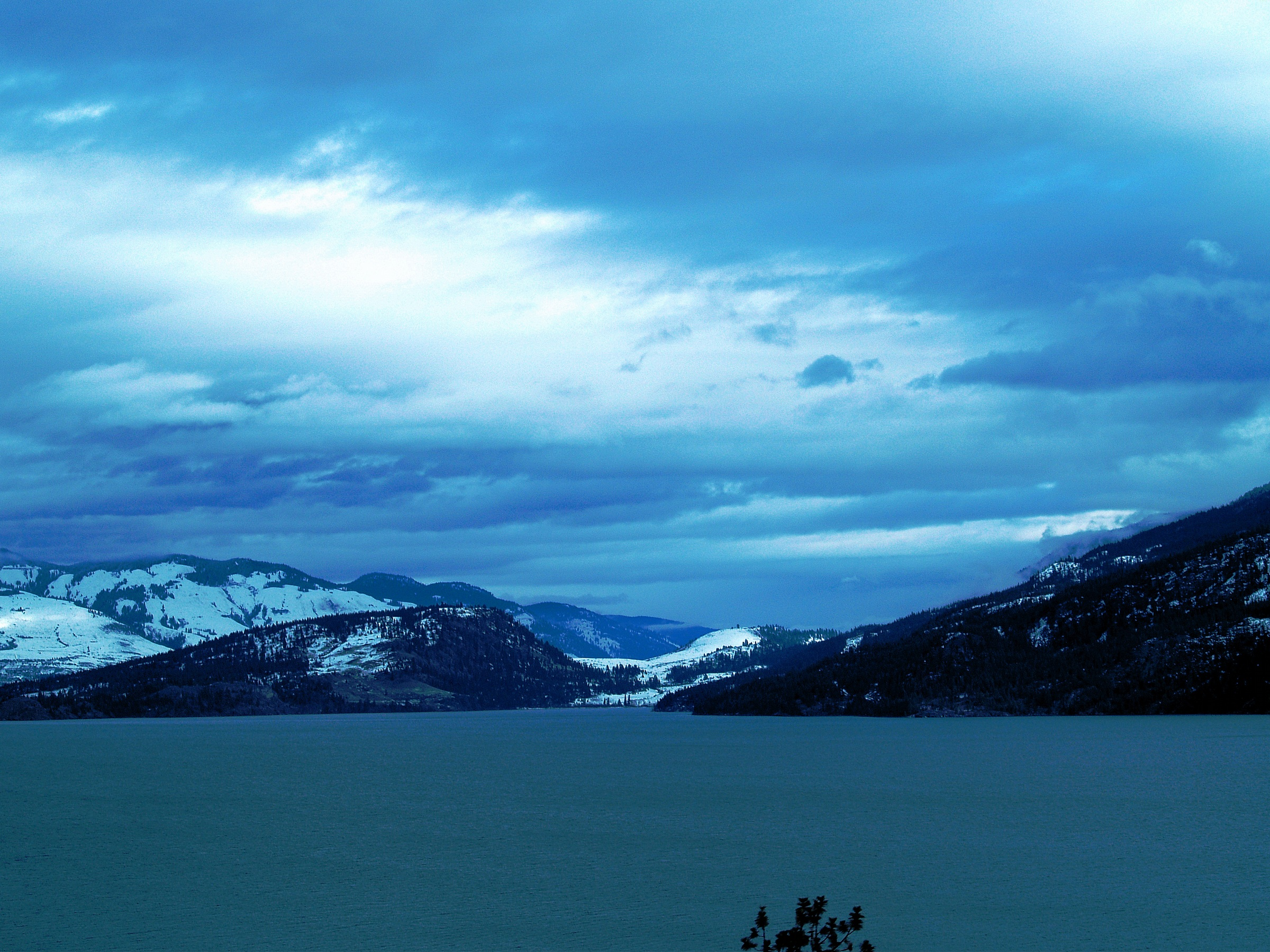
Kalmalka Lake Provincial Park

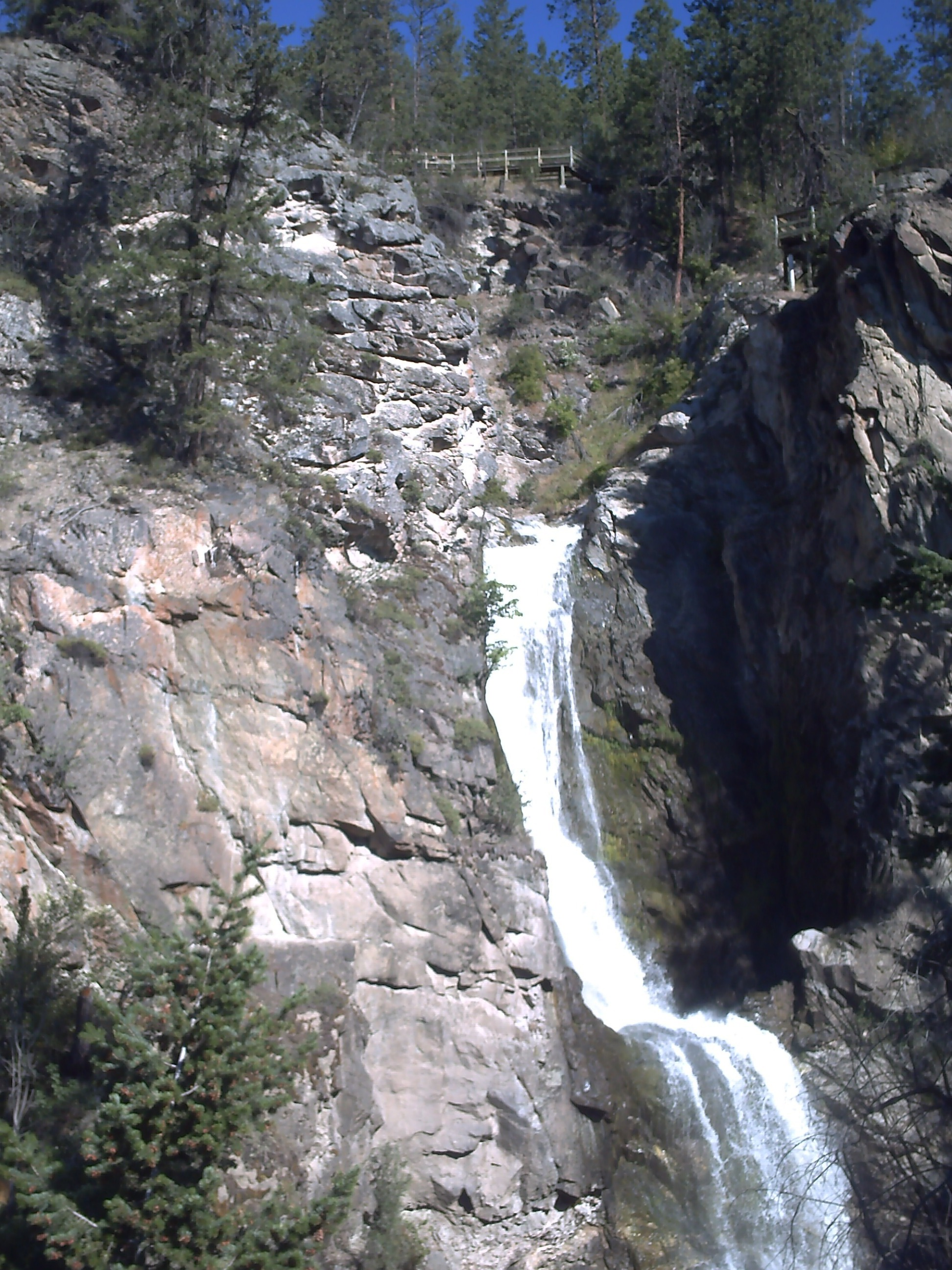
Fintry Provincial Park

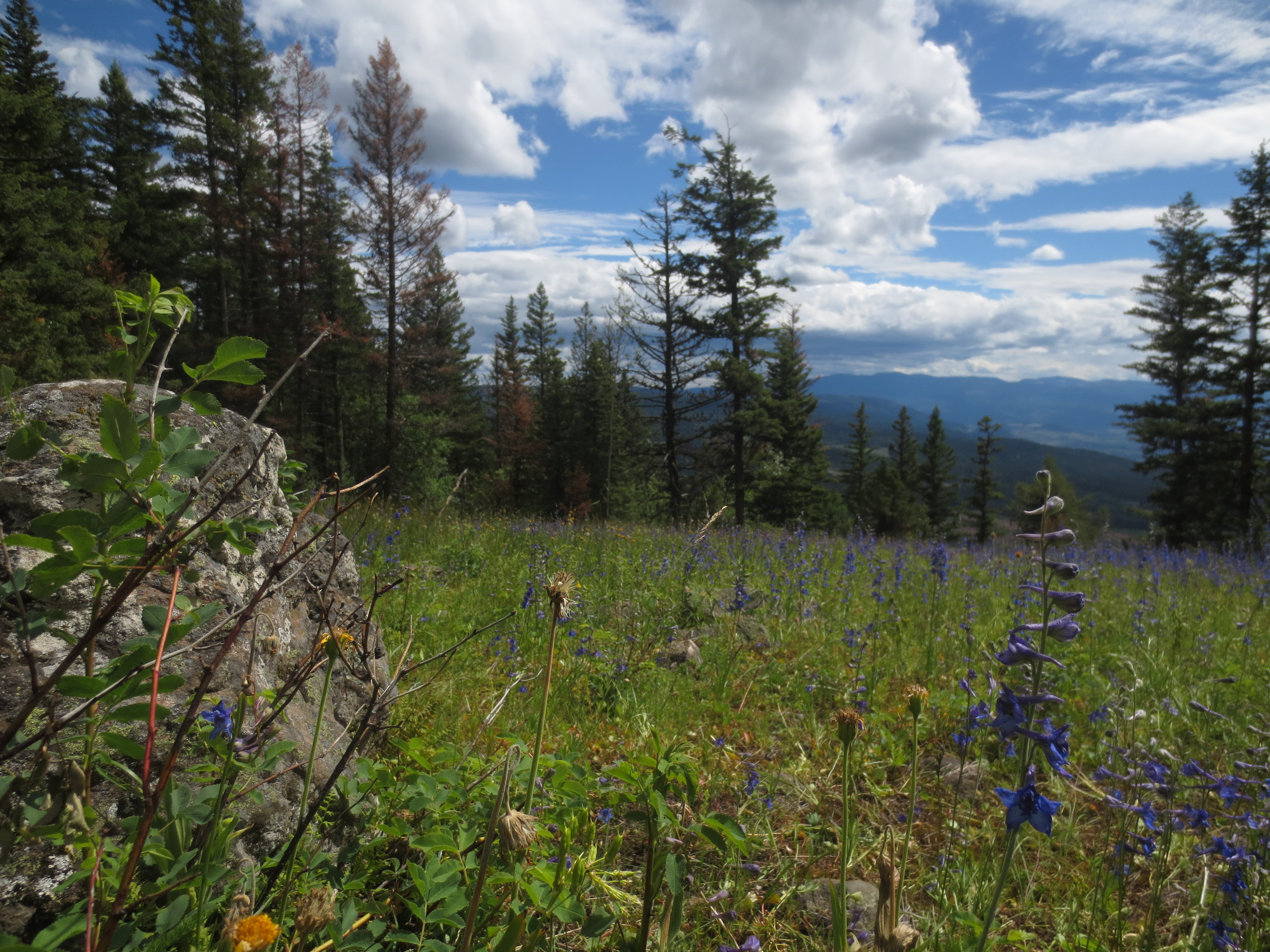
Wrinkly Face Provincial Park

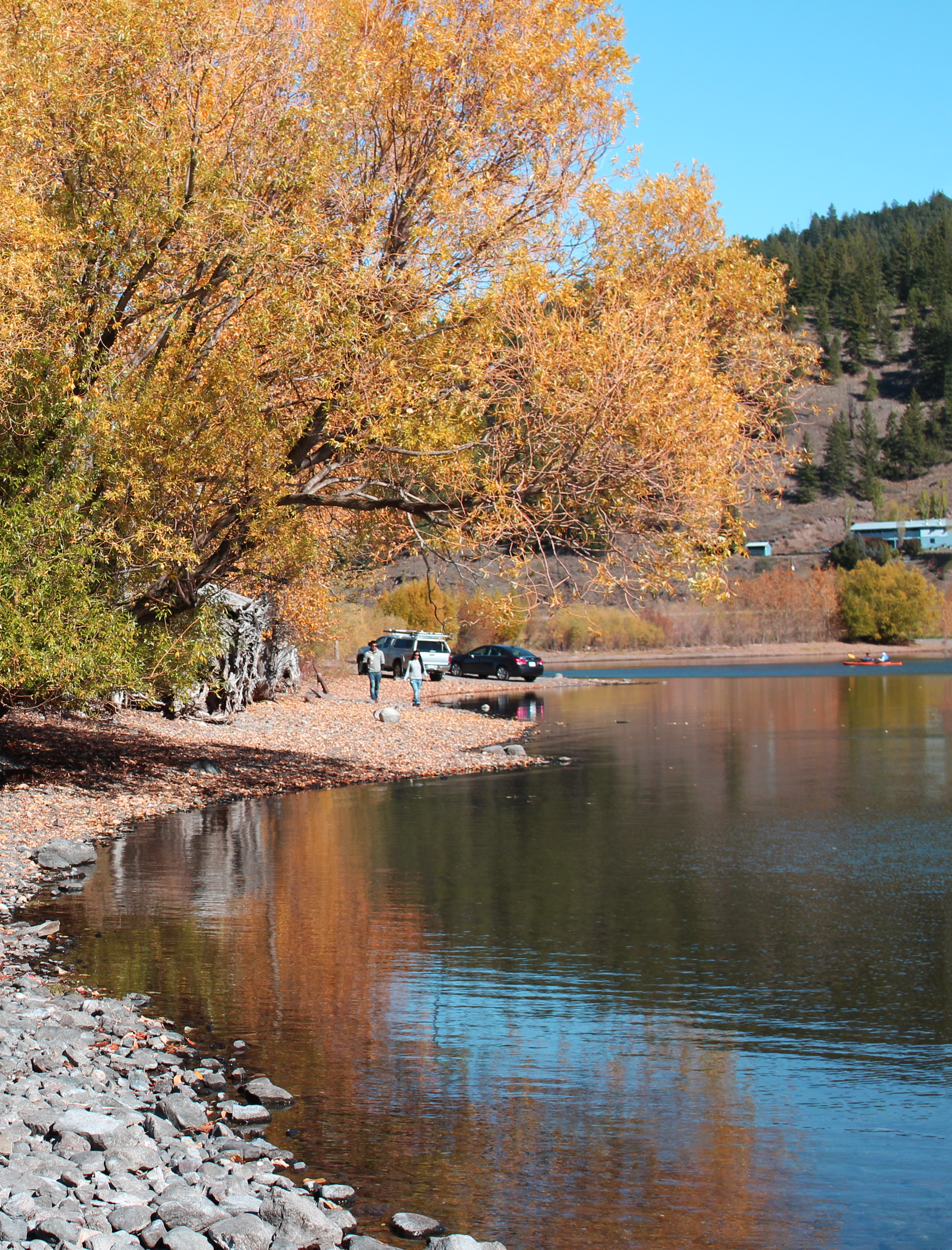
Bear Creek Provincial Park

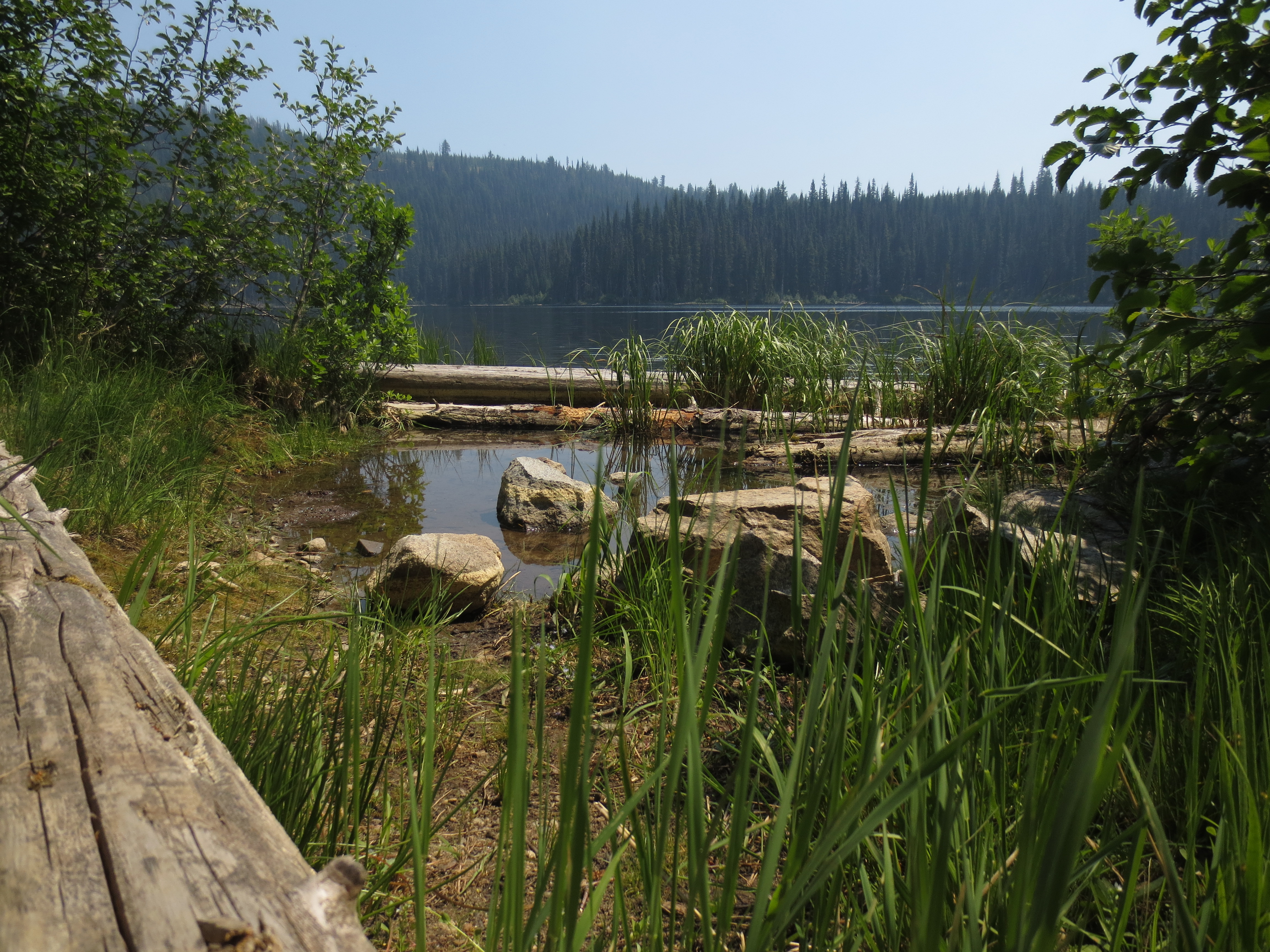
Trepanier Provincial Park

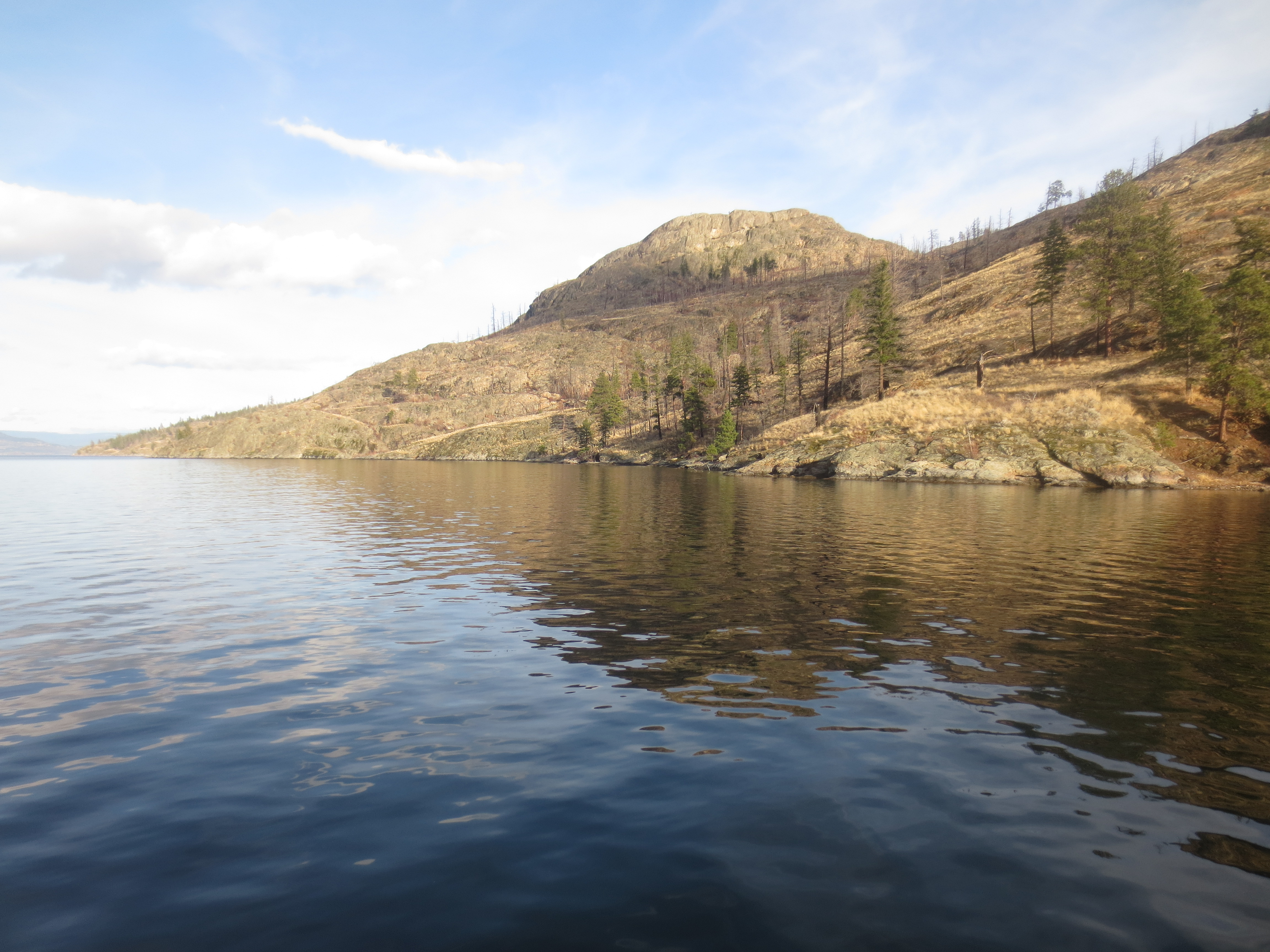
Okanagan Mountain Provincial Park

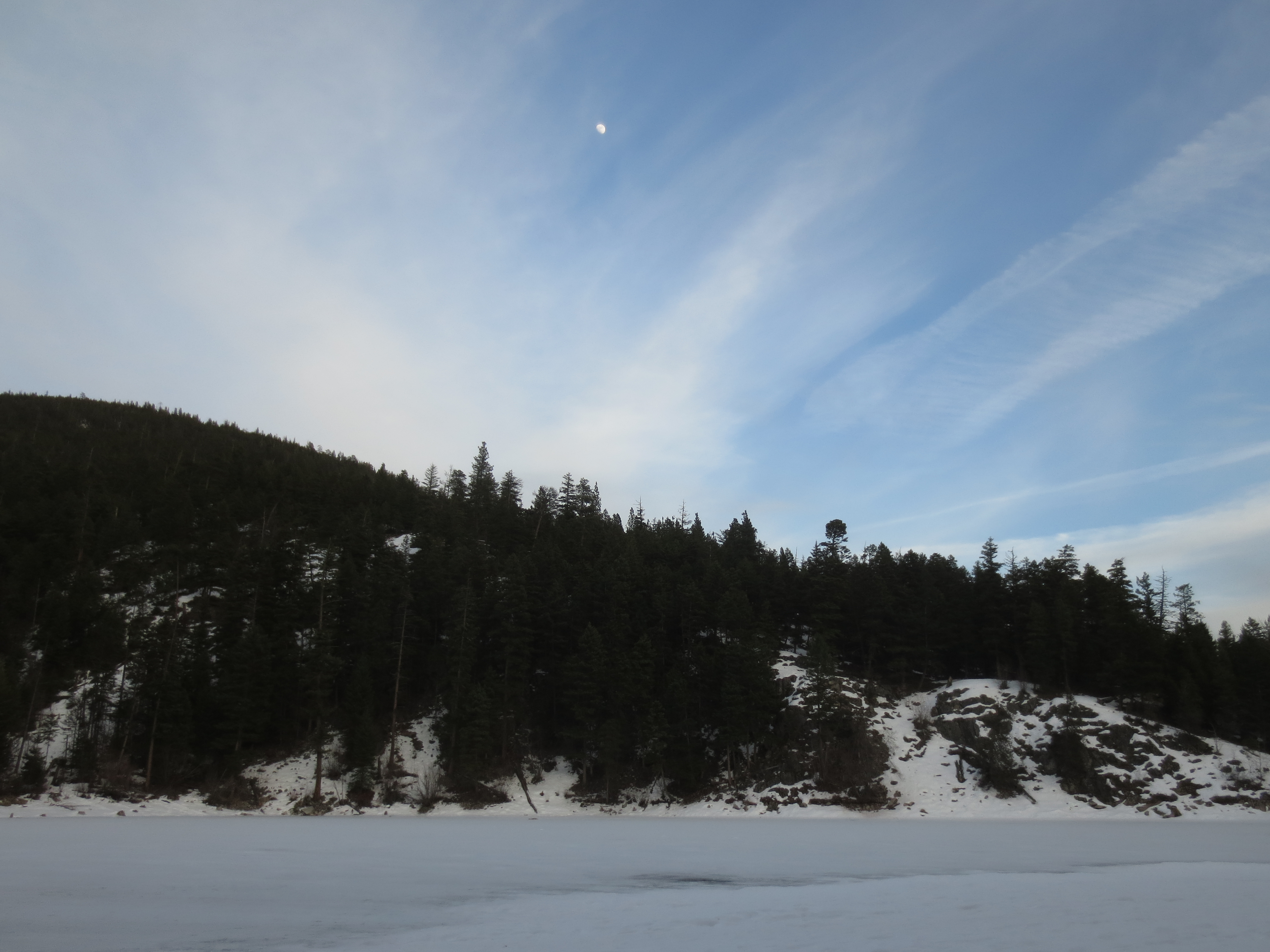
Darke Lake Provincial Park

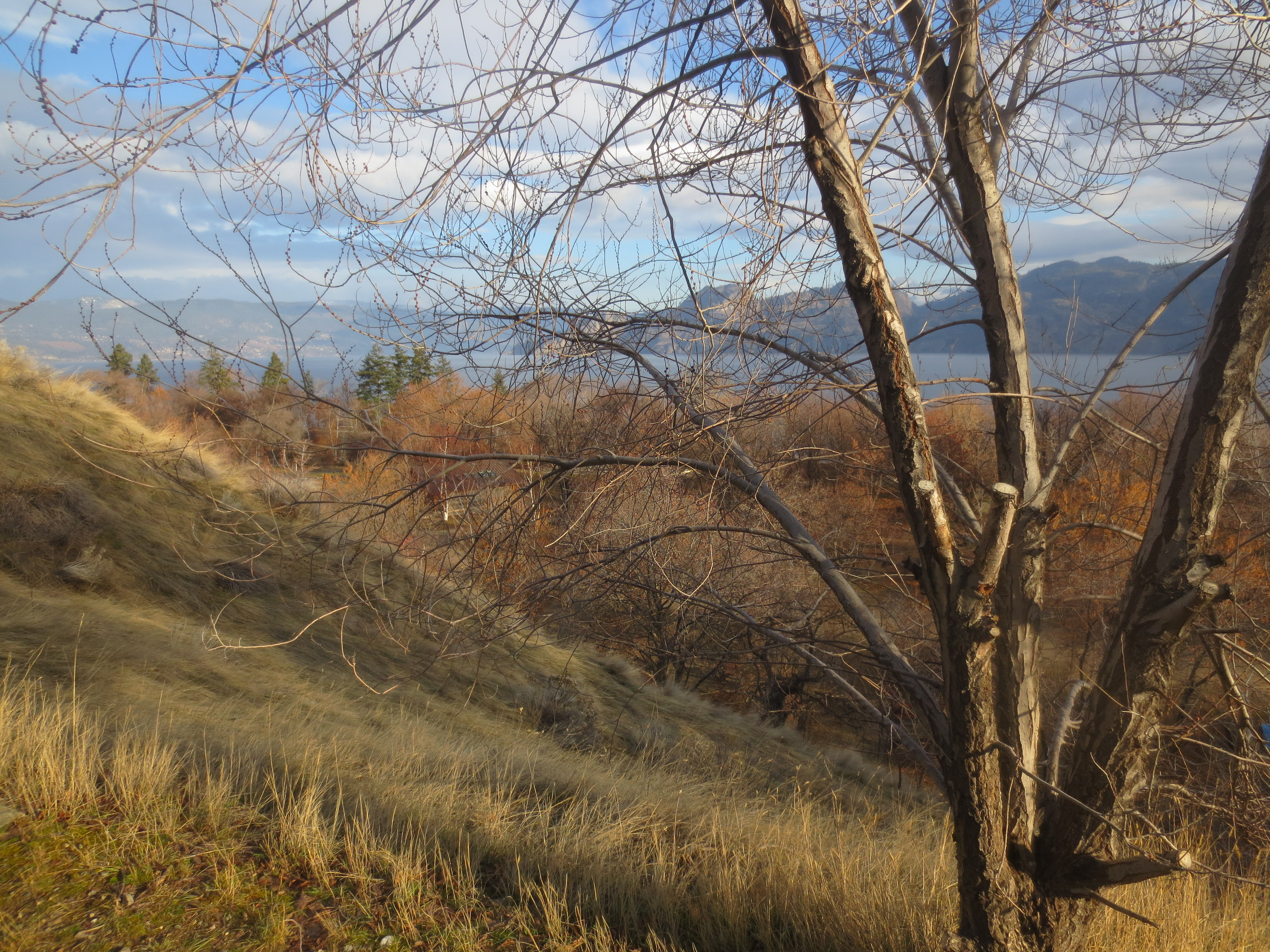
Okanagan Lake Provincial Park

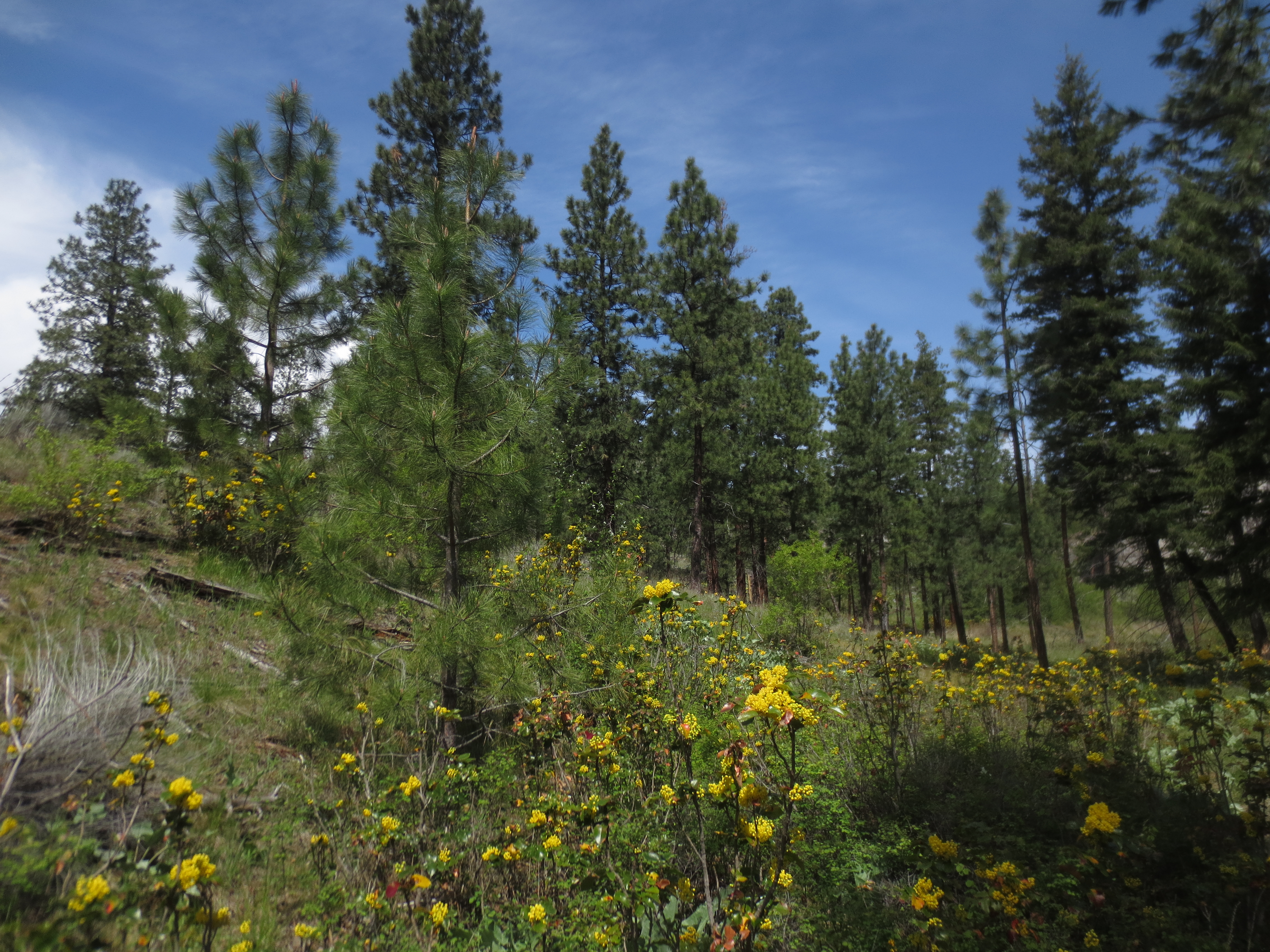
Skaha Bluffs Provincial Park

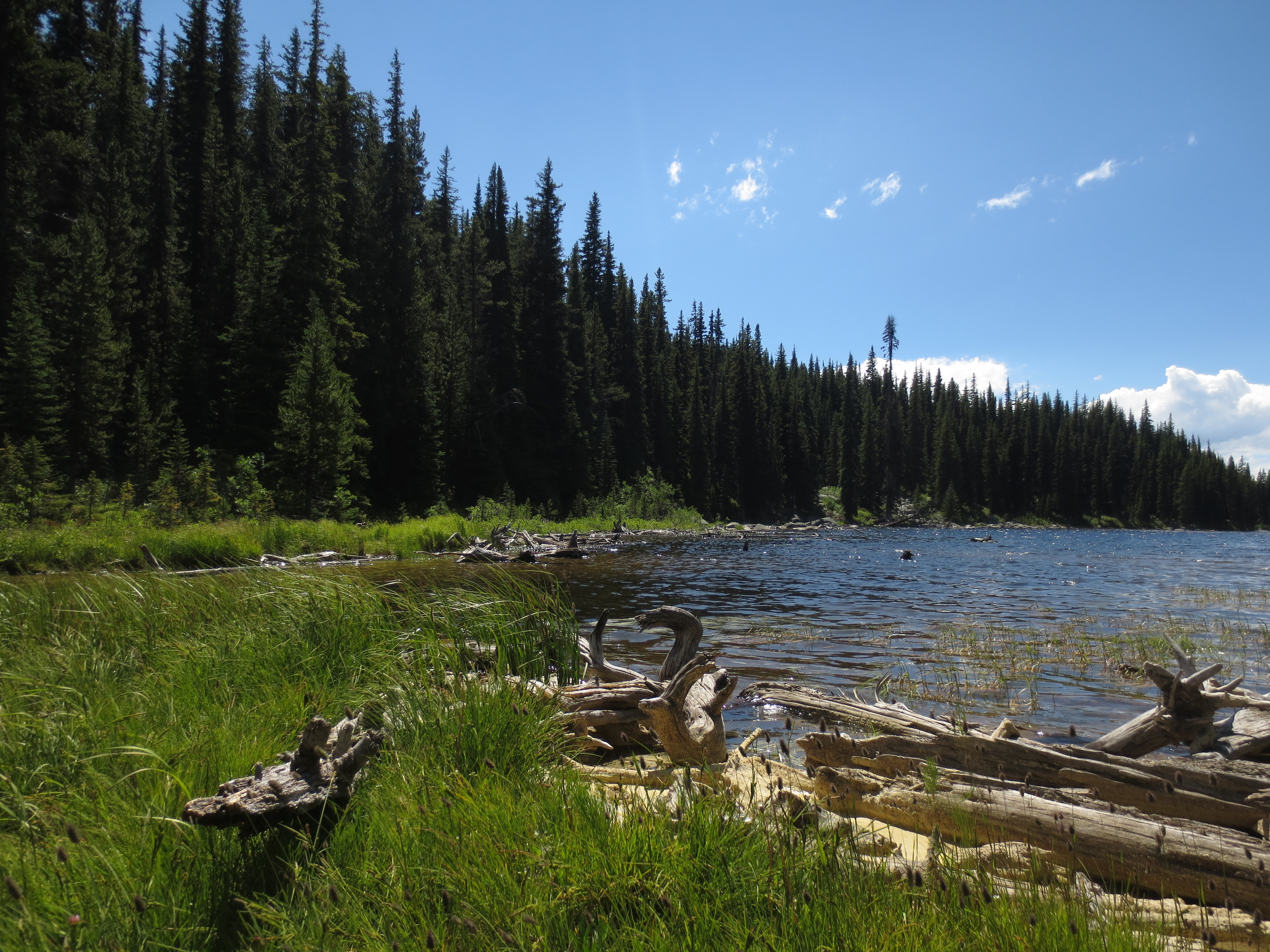
Nickel Plate Provincial Park

== Climate ==
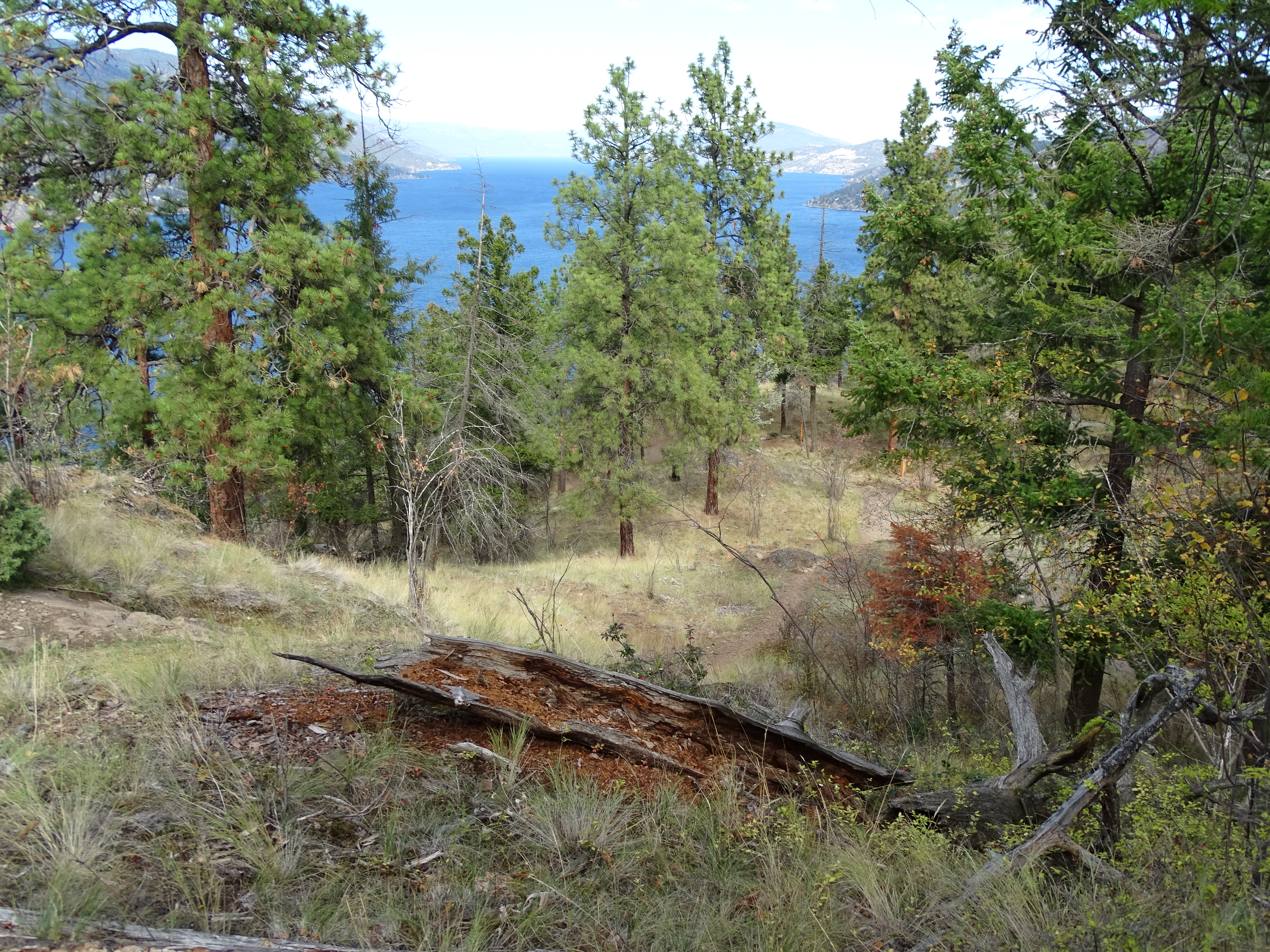
Dry forest of Knox Mountain Park, just north of Kelowna

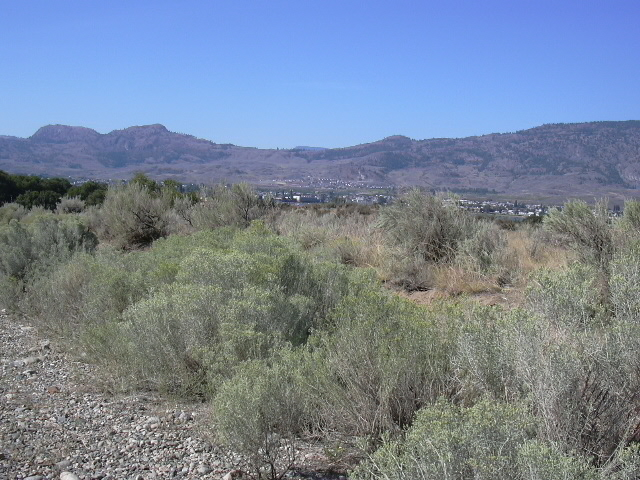
Semi-arid shrubland near Osoyoos

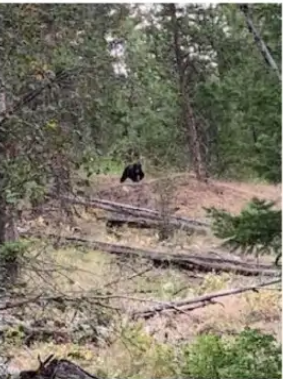
Pictured black bear in North Okanagan, 1982

The Okanagan has a mild, relatively dry climate that varies depending on latitude. Most of the Okanagan lies within the rain shadow of the Cascade Mountains to the southwest. Areas in the north end of the valley receive more precipitation and cooler temperatures than areas to the south. Generally, Kelowna is the transition zone between the drier south and the wetter north.

The Okanagan north of Kelowna has a humid continental climate (Köppen: Dfb) with warm, sometimes hot summers and cold winters with highs around freezing, though mild by Canadian standards. Precipitation is well distributed year round. Some regions of the Okanagan, most notably near Kelowna, border on an inland oceanic climate due to it having an average temperature slightly above −3.0 °C (26.6 °F) and below 0 °C (32 °F). Dry forests of ponderosa pine and low grasses dominate the valleys and mountains in this region.

The Okanagan south of Kelowna has a semi-arid climate (Köppen: Bsk) with hot, dry summers and cool winters. The average daytime temperature in this region is about 15.0 °C (59.0 °F), which is the warmest in Canada. The average annual precipitation in this region is also the second driest in Canada outside of the Arctic, the driest being the Thompson River Valley west of Kamloops. The southern Okanagan is dominated by northern reach of the Columbia Plateau ecoregion and is the only xeric shrubland ecosystem in Canada. Dry forests of ponderosa pine and low grasses can be found at higher elevations to the east. Despite being located in a xeric shrubland, areas near Osoyoos and Oliver claim to be part of Canada's only desert.

Between 2000 BCE and 1900 CE, the climate and vegetation of the Okanagan had changed little. But historical records from the Pacific Agrifood Research Station in Summerland indicate that the Okanagan climate warmed by about 1 °C between 1908 and 1994.

== History ==
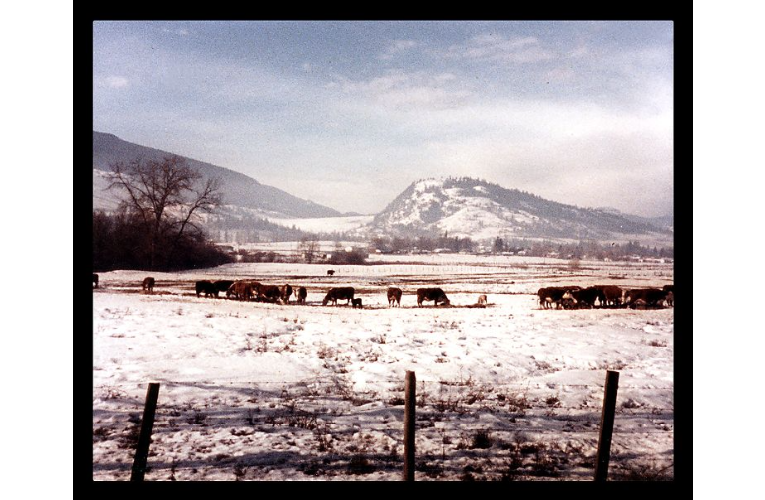
Coldstream Ranch in 1986.

The Okanagan Valley is home to the Syilx, commonly known as the Okanagan people, an Interior Salish people who live in the valley from the head of Okanagan Lake downstream to near the river's confluence with the Columbia River in present-day Washington, as well as in the neighbouring Similkameen Valley and the Upper Nicola to the north of that, though the whole of their traditional territory encompasses the entire Columbia River watershed and includes areas east of the Okanogan River in Washington, i.e. the Colville Reservation. At the height of Okanagan culture, about 3000 years ago, it is estimated that 12,000 people lived in this valley and surrounding areas. The Okanagan people employed an adaptive strategy, moving within traditional areas throughout the year to fish, hunt, or collect food, while in the winter months, they lived in semi-permanent villages of kekulis, a type of pithouse. Today the member bands of the Okanagan Nation Alliance are sovereign nations, with vibrant natural resource and tourism based economies. Their annual August gathering near Vernon is a celebration of the continuance of Syilx life and culture.

In 1811, the first non-natives came to the Okanagan Valley, in the form of a fur trading expedition voyaging north out of Fort Okanogan, a Pacific Fur Company outpost at the confluence of the Okanogan and Columbia Rivers. Within fifteen years, fur traders established, known as the Brigade Trail via the Cariboo Plateau and Thompson Country to Fort Kamloops and through the Okanagan, from Fort Alexandria at the southern end of the New Caledonia fur district in the Central Interior to the north, to Fort Vancouver, the HBC's headquarters in the Columbia Department, for passing furs between New Caledonia and the Columbia River for shipment to the Pacific. The trade route lasted until 1846, when the Oregon Treaty laid down the border between British North America and the United States west of the Rocky Mountains on the 49th parallel. The new border cut across the valley, bisecting Osoyoos Lake. To avoid paying tariffs, British traders forged a newer route that bypassed Fort Okanogan via the Fraser Canyon from Spuzzum up over the Cascade Mountains, then via the Nicola, Coldwater and Fraser rivers to Fort Langley instead of to Fort Vancouver, which had come into being in American territory. The Okanagan Valley did not see many more outsiders for a decade afterward.

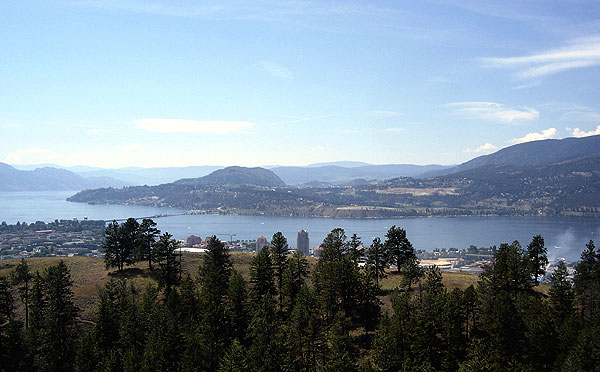
View of the Okanagan Valley from the hills above Kelowna

In 1859, the first European settlement was established when Father Charles Pandosy led the making of an Oblate mission at Okanagan Mission, now a neighbourhood of Kelowna. The Fraser Canyon Gold Rush of 1858 eventually encouraged more settlement as some prospectors from the United States took the Okanagan Trail route on their way to the Fraser Canyon, although at the height of the rush the American adventurers who used the route did not settle because of outright hostilities from the Syilx, whom a few of the parties traversing the trail had harassed and brutalized. A few staked claims around the South Okanagan and Similkameen valleys and found gold and copper in places, with another trail from Fort Hope to newer goldfields at Rock Creek and Wild Horse Creek in the East Kootenay, skirting the US border and crossing Osoyoos Lake at Osoyoos, a customs post and also the location of the gold commissioner's office. The Dewdney Trail, surveyed and built by Edgar Dewdney, was constructed to prevent trade in the region from going north-south instead of remaining firmly under British control, and also for military mobility purposes should the need arise. In the decades after the gold rushes, ranchers, mostly on military land grants, settled on Okanagan Lake; notable ones included the Coldstream Ranch near Vernon, the Ellis Ranch, which formed the basis of the City of Penticton once subdivided, and the Richter Ranch, which continues in operation today, in the mountains between the Town of Oliver and the Village of Keremeos in the Similkameen.

A mining industry began in the southern Okanagan region, with Fairview, now an empty benchland on the western side of Oliver, the best-known and largest of the boomtowns created in the later part of the 19th century. More farmers, as well as a small service industry, came to meet the miners' needs.

Fruit production is a hallmark of the Okanagan Valley today, but the industry began with difficulty. Commercial orcharding of apples was first tried there in 1892, but a series of setbacks prevented the major success of commercial fruit crops until the 1920s. In 1936, the grower-owned BC Tree Fruits Cooperative was established to store, package, and sell Okanagan fruit.

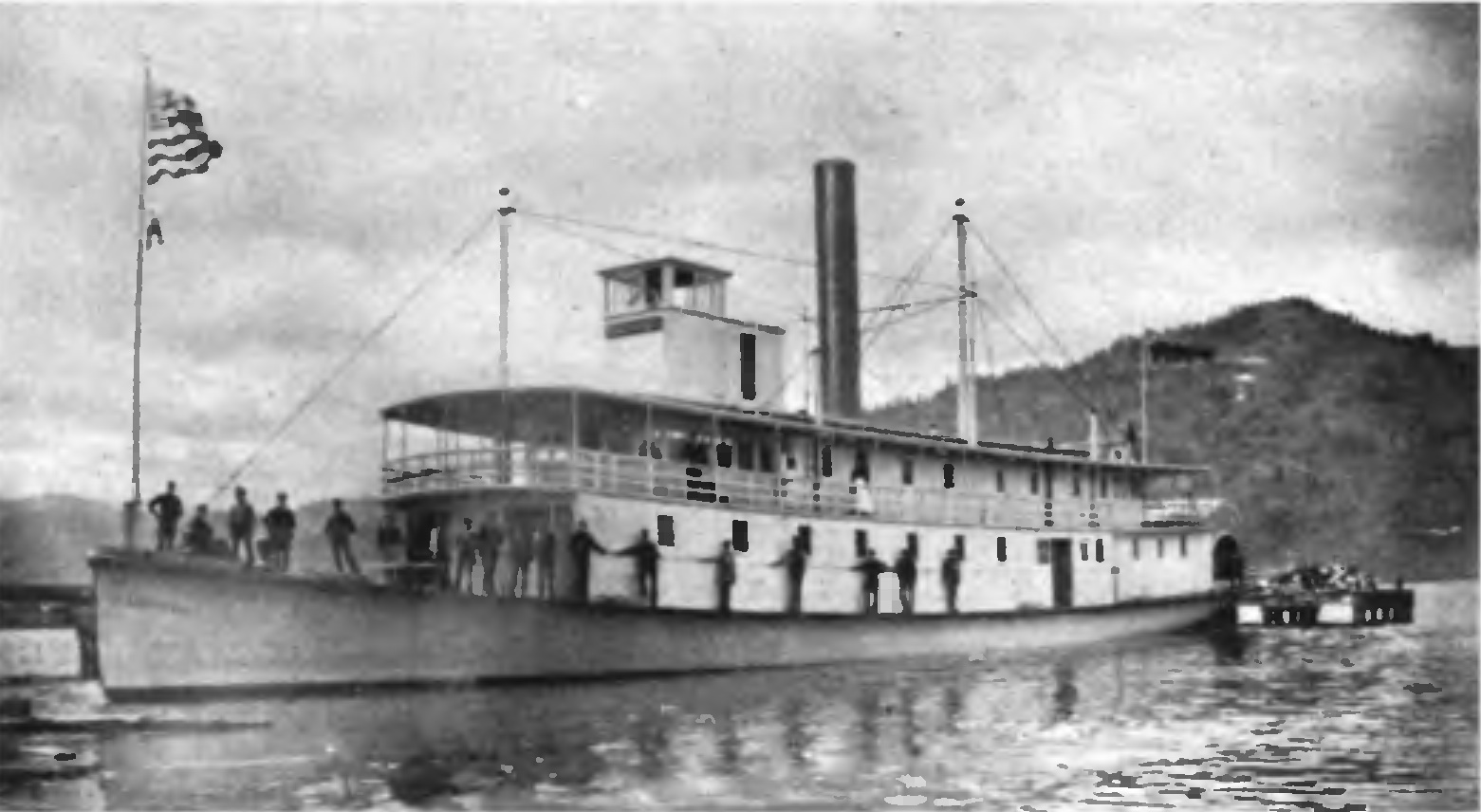
SS Aberdeen

Until the 1930s, the demand for shipping fruit and other goods drove a need for ongoing operations of the sternwheeler steamboats that serviced Okanagan Lake, operated by a subsidiary of the Canadian Pacific Railway, linking the Southern Mainline with the original transcontinental mainline at Sicamous: the SS Aberdeen from 1886, the SS Sicamous and SS Naramata from 1914, and others. The Sicamous and Naramata survive as a tourist attraction on Okanagan Beach on the north side of Penticton, the Sicamous serving both as a museum and also an event facility. Other steamboats operated on Skaha Lake to the south of that city. The club lounge and wheelhouse, without any keel or hull, of the SS Okanagan are in the same park as the Sicamous and Naramata.

While the last half-century has grown several resource-based enterprises in the region, primarily forestry, mining played an important role in earlier times. Favoured by its sunny climate, lakes, and winery attractions, the valley has become a popular destination for vacationers and retirees. The area also attracts seasonal fruit-picking labourers, primarily from Quebec and Mexico.

== Demographics ==
The region's population was 403,950 as of the 2021 Canadian census. The three regional districts within the Okanagan and their populations were Central Okanagan (222,162), North Okanagan (91,610) and Okanagan-Similkameen (90,178).

The statistical figures below are based on the 2011 Canadian census, 2021 Canadian census, and the British Columbia Ministry of Communities, Sport and Cultural Development.

=== Municipalities ===
Municipalities in the Okanagan
Name	Type	Regional district	Population (2021)	Area (2011)	Density (2021) (Pop./km^{2})	Incorporated
Armstrong	City	North Okanagan	5,323	5.24 km^{2} (2.0 sq mi)	1020	1913
Coldstream	District	North Okanagan	11,171	67.25 km^{2} (26.0 sq mi)	167.8	1906
Enderby	City	North Okanagan	3,028	4.26 km^{2} (1.6 sq mi)	710.4	1905
Kelowna	City	Central Okanagan	144,576	211.82 km^{2} (81.8 sq mi)	682.4	1905
Keremeos	Village	Okanagan-Similkameen	1,608	2.09 km^{2} (0.8 sq mi)	769.4	1956
Lake Country	District	Central Okanagan	15,817	122.19 km^{2} (47.2 sq mi)	129.5	1995
Lumby	Village	North Okanagan	2,063	5.27 km^{2} (2.0 sq mi)	347.7	1955
Oliver	Town	Okanagan-Similkameen	5,094	4.88 km^{2} (1.9 sq mi)	927.9	1945
Okanagan Falls	District	Okanagan-Similkameen	2,266	3.8174 km^{2} (1.5 sq mi)	1.4739	2026
Osoyoos	Town	Okanagan-Similkameen	5,556	8.76 km^{2} (3.4 sq mi)	660.7	1946
Peachland	District	Central Okanagan	5,789	15.75 km^{2} (6.1 sq mi)	359.6	1909
Penticton	City	Okanagan-Similkameen	36,885	42.10 km^{2} (16.3 sq mi)	857.3	1908
Princeton	Town	Okanagan-Similkameen	2,894	59.28 km^{2} (22.9 sq mi)	48.8	1951
Spallumcheen	District	North Okanagan	5,307	255.77 km^{2} (98.8 sq mi)	20.8	1892
Summerland	District	Okanagan-Similkameen	12,042	74.06 km^{2} (28.6 sq mi)	162.6	1906
Vernon	City	North Okanagan	44,519	95.76 km^{2} (37.0 sq mi)	461.7	1892
West Kelowna	City	Central Okanagan	36,078	123.51 km^{2} (47.7 sq mi)	295.5	2007

Statistics Canada. 2017. Armstrong, CY [Census subdivision], British Columbia and Okanagan, RD [Census division], British Columbia (table). Census Profile. 2016 Census. Statistics Canada Catalogue no. 98-316-X2016001. Ottawa. Released February 8, 2017. https://www12.statcan.gc.ca/census-recensement/2016/dp-pd/prof/index.cfm?Lang=E (accessed April 16, 2017).

=== Designated places ===
Designated places in the Okanagan
Name	Regional district	Population (2011)	Area (2011)	Density (2011) (Pop./km^{2})
Kaleden	Okanagan-Similkameen	1,224	4.32 km^{2} (1.7 sq mi)	283.6
Naramata	Okanagan-Similkameen	1,647	7.99 km^{2} (3.1 sq mi)	206.2
Olalla	Okanagan-Similkameen	401	0.49 km^{2} (0.2 sq mi)	826.3

=== Unincorporated communities ===
==== North Okanagan ====
- Cherryville
- Grindrod
- Lavington

==== Central Okanagan ====
- Carr's Landing (part of Lake Country)
- Okanagan Centre (part of Lake Country)
- Okanagan Mission (part of Kelowna)
- Oyama (part of Lake Country)
- Lakeview Heights (part of West Kelowna)
- Rutland (part of Kelowna)
- Westbank (part of West Kelowna)
- Winfield (part of Lake Country)

==== South Okanagan ====
- Faulder
- Fairview (part of Oliver)
- Shingle Creek
- Okanagan Falls

=== Indian reserves ===
The Indian reserves of the Okanagan first peoples also form identifiable communities:

- Osoyoos Indian Band
- Penticton Indian Band
- Westbank First Nation (Kelowna)
- Okanagan Indian Band (Vernon)

The Osoyoos and Westbank Indian Reserves have large non-native populations because of band-governed residential and commercial development on their lands. The Osoyoos Indian Reserve leases large swathes of land to commercial vineyard developments and is where 40% of wine grapes used in the Okanagan come from.

=== Ghost towns ===
- Yankee Flats

== Sport ==
Ice hockey is a popular sport in the region, with WHL team Kelowna Rockets playing in the region's most populated city. The Jr. A teams are the Vernon Vipers, West Kelowna Warriors and the Penticton Vees of the BCHL. Penticton were the 2012 national Jr. A champions, after they ousted the Woodstock Slammers for the title. Jr. B sides Kelowna Chiefs, Sicamous Eagles, Summerland Steam, Osoyoos Coyotes and North Okanagan Knights play in the KIJHL, Osoyoos having won the 2010/11 KIJHL season. Penticton and Summerland are both home to NHL defenceman Duncan Keith.

The area has hosted multiple junior hockey championships, including the Memorial Cup in Kelowna in 2004 and RBC Cup in Vernon in 1990 (then called the Centennial Cup) and 2014.

Kelowna is home to junior Canadian football team Okanagan Sun, and Jr. Baseball team Kelowna Falcons, including the UBC Okanagan Heat university program.

== Agriculture ==
The continued growth and operation of the agricultural industry in the Okanagan depends on the employment of temporary migrant workers. In 2009, 3,000 Mexican migrant labourers worked in the Okanagan.

== See also ==
- Okanagan Basin Water Board
- Okanagan Country
- Sunshine tax
