= Swan Lake (Okanagan) =

Lake in Vernon, British Columbia, Canada

- Location within British Columbia
- Location: Osoyoos Division Yale Land District, Southern Interior of British Columbia
- Coordinates: 50°19′12″N 119°15′24″W
- Primary inflows: BX Creek
- Primary outflows: BX Creek
- Basin countries: Canada
- Max. length: 5.0 km (3.1 mi)
- Max. width: 1.16 km (0.72 mi)
- Surface area: 412.8 ha (1,020 acres)
- Shore length^{1}: 11.5 km (7.1 mi)
- Surface elevation: 390 m (1,280 ft)
- Settlements: Vernon, BC
- ^{1} Shore length is not a well-defined measure.

Swan Lake is a lake in the Osoyoos Division Yale Land District within the Southern Interior of British Columbia, Canada.

== Geographical context ==
The lake is just east of the north end of Okanagan Lake, between Vernon and Armstrong.

== See also ==
- List of lakes of British Columbia
