= Echo Lake Provincial Park =

Provincial park in British Columbia

- IUCN category II (national park)
- Location within British Columbia
- Interactive map of Echo Lake Provincial Park
- Location: Osoyoos Division Yale Land District, British Columbia, Canada
- Nearest city: Vernon, BC
- Coordinates: 50°12′10″N 118°42′28″W
- Area: 154 ha (380 acres)
- Established: 27 April 1956
- Governing body: BC Parks

Echo Lake Provincial Park is a provincial park in British Columbia, Canada, located south-east of Lumby in the Okanagan Highlands, to the south of BC Highway 6.

== See also ==
- List of British Columbia Provincial Parks
