= Kalamalka Lake Provincial Park and Protected Area =

Provincial park in Coldstream, British Columbia, Canada

Kalamalka Lake Provincial Park
- IUCN category II (national park)
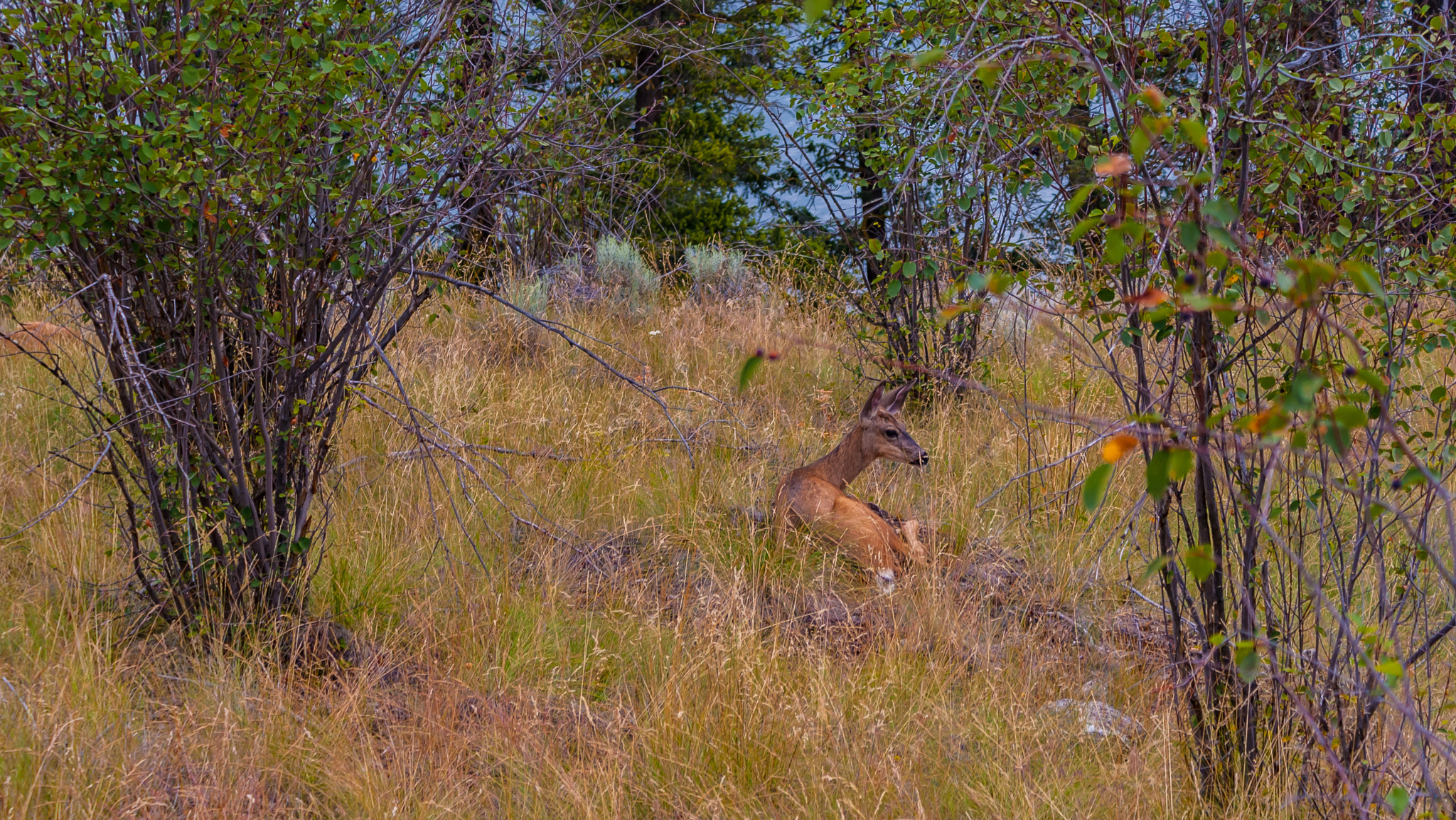
- Deer at Kalamalka Lake

- Location within British Columbia
- Interactive map of Kalamalka Lake Provincial Park
- Location: Osoyoos Division Yale Land District, British Columbia, Canada
- Nearest city: Vernon, BC
- Coordinates: 50°10′59″N 119°15′44″W
- Area: 978 ha (2,420 acres)
- Established: September 11, 1975
- Governing body: BC Parks
- Website: bcparks.ca/kalamalka-lake-park/

Kalamalka Lake Provincial Park and Protected Area is a provincial park in Coldstream, British Columbia, Canada. Located within the Okanagan region, the park encompasses a land area of about 978 hectares (2,420 acres) of pristine natural areas in the North Okanagan Regional District. Kalamalka Lake Provincial Park and Protected Area adopted its current name from Kalamalka Lake, for which it is located on its shore. During the process of entering summer, calcium carbonate forms crystals that reflect sunlight and create the vivid blue and green colours. Temperature changes in the fall and the spring sometimes create ribbons of deep blue colour in the lake, seen from the park.

The park is a preserved remnant of the natural grasslands that once stretched from Vernon to Osoyoos. There are several forests and cross-country ski trails available throughout the year, along with two archaeological sites. Mammals include coyote, deer, black bear, Columbian ground squirrel, marmot, mink, bobcat and red fox.
