= Kickininee Provincial Park =

Provincial park in British Columbia, Canada

- IUCN category II (national park)
- Location within British Columbia
- Interactive map of Kickininee Provincial Park
- Location: British Columbia, Canada
- Nearest city: Summerland
- Coordinates: 49°32′34″N 119°37′45″W
- Area: 0.48 km^{2} (0.19 sq mi)
- Established: March 8, 1970
- Governing body: BC Parks

Kickininee Provincial Park is a provincial park in British Columbia, Canada, located just south of the town of Summerland in that province's Okanagan region. Originally established in 1970 with approximately seven acres (28,000 m^{2}) of upland and 113.5 acres (0.459 km^{2}) of foreshore, the park today comprises approximately 48.76 ha.
