= Coldstream Ranch =

Farm in the Okanagan, British Columbia

Coordinates: 50°13′23″N 119°11′40″W

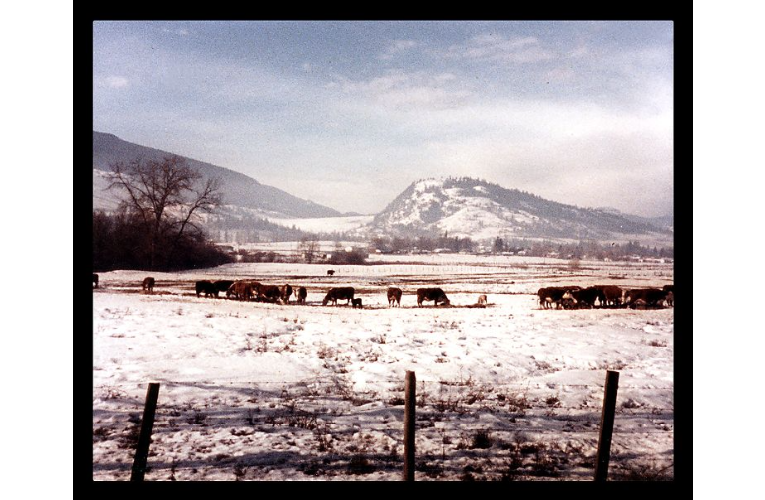
Cattle grazing in the pasture of Cold stream Ranch, 1986

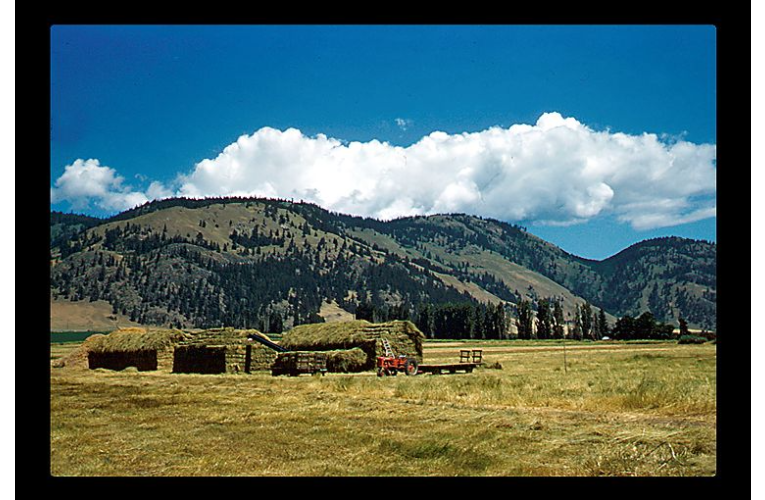
1954 photo of the ranch

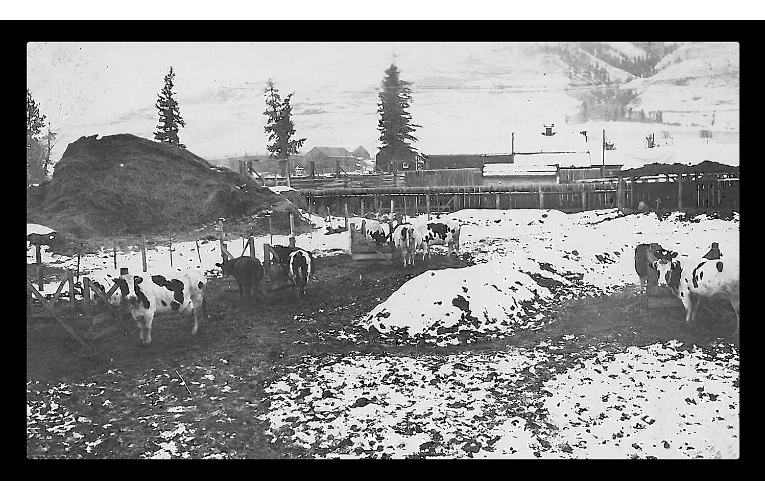
Milk cows in 1919

Coldstream Ranch is a landmark agricultural estate and one of the oldest continuously operating ranches in British Columbia, Canada. Located in the District of Coldstream, just southeast of Vernon, the ranch encompasses a vast expanse of the northern Okanagan Valley. Established in the mid-19th century, it served as the catalyst for the region’s development, transitioning from a frontier cattle outpost to the birthplace of the Okanagan's commercial fruit industry.

== History ==
The ranch’s history began in 1863 when Captain Charles Frederick Houghton, a retired British Army officer, settled in the valley on a military land grant. Houghton named the property "Coldstream" after the cold water springs that fed the local creek. Within a few years, Houghton traded the acreage to brothers Forbes and Charles Vernon, who arrived from England to seek their fortune. Under the Vernons’ stewardship, the ranch grew into a massive enterprise exceeding 13,000 acres. They introduced a grist mill and established essential irrigation works that would later define the valley’s geography. Forbes Vernon eventually became a prominent provincial politician, and the nearby settlement was renamed in his honor upon its incorporation.

In 1891, the ranch entered its most influential era when it was purchased by Lord Aberdeen (the 7th Earl of Aberdeen and future Governor General of Canada) and his wife, Lady Aberdeen. The couple envisioned the Okanagan as a premier agricultural destination and invested heavily in infrastructure to support commercial orcharding. They oversaw the planting of tens of thousands of apple, pear, and cherry trees and commissioned the construction of the Grey Canal, an ambitious irrigation system that diverted water from the mountains to the arid valley floor. To encourage settlement, the Aberdeens subdivided portions of the ranch into small holdings, attracting a wave of British immigrants.

During World War II, the ranch’s role shifted from purely agricultural to strategic. Large sections of the property were utilized by the Canadian military for training maneuvers. To support the thousands of soldiers stationed there, permanent facilities were constructed, including a Social Hall and extensive mess kitchens. Following the war, the ranch returned to private agricultural production. It underwent several ownership changes throughout the mid-20th century, though it remained a dominant force in the local cattle industry, eventually being purchased in 1994 by local businessman Keith Balcaen.

=== Present day ===
Today, Coldstream Ranch remains a working family-run enterprise under the Balcaen family, balancing its historical roots with modern industrial scale. Spanning roughly 9,000 to 12,000 acres, the ranch is a primary producer of beef and forage crops. It operates a significant cow-calf program and grows massive quantities of silage corn and cereals. In 2017, the ranch diversified further by selling 700 acres to Vegpro International, which established a large-scale salad green operation on the site, integrating high-tech hydroponic-style outdoor farming into the ranch’s footprint.

In the 21st century, the ranch has become a leader in ecological management and wildfire mitigation. Through partnerships with environmental programs, the ranch utilizes targeted grazing to manage forest fuels and employs drone technology for the restoration of soil and native grasses. While much of the land remains private, the ranch continues to shape the community through land conservation; in 2021, the Regional District of North Okanagan acquired a portion of the ranchlands to ensure the preservation of local biodiversity and the creation of public recreation trails.
