= Eneas Lakes Provincial Park =

Provincial park in British Columbia, Canada

- IUCN category II (national park)
- Location within British Columbia
- Interactive map of Eneas Lakes Provincial Park
- Location: Osoyoos Division Yale Land District, British Columbia, Canada
- Nearest city: Peachland, BC
- Coordinates: 49°45′19″N 119°56′10″W
- Area: 1,036 ha (2,560 acres)
- Established: May 21, 1968
- Governing body: BC Parks

Eneas Lakes Provincial Park is a provincial park in British Columbia, Canada, west of the town of Peachland, to the south of Peachland Creek. The park is about 1036 ha. in size and was established in 1968. The Eneas Lakes lie at the head of Finlay Creek.
