= Yankee Flats =

Coordinates: 50°31′N 119°22′W

Yankee Flats is a ghost town located in the Okanagan region of British Columbia. The town is situated on the west side of the Salmon River.
