= Ellison Provincial Park =

Provincial park in British Columbia, Canada

- IUCN category II (national park)
- The beach at Ellison Provincial Park

- Location within British Columbia
- Interactive map of Ellison Provincial Park
- Location: Osoyoos Division Yale Land District, British Columbia, Canada
- Nearest city: Vernon, BC
- Coordinates: 50°10′30″N 119°25′59″W
- Area: 219 ha (540 acres)
- Established: May 12, 1988
- Governing body: BC Parks

Ellison Provincial Park is a provincial park in British Columbia, Canada, located on the east side of Okanagan Lake to the south of the city of Vernon. The park contains approximately 219 hectares (2.19 km^{2}) of land, 200 ha. of it upland, 19 ha. of it foreshore.

== Name origin ==
The park is named for Price Ellison (1852–1932), who emigrated to British Columbia in 1876 from Manchester, settling in this area and engaging in stock raising and wheat growing. A provincial MLA from 1898 to 1916, he was appointed to cabinet posts in the government of Sir Richard McBride – Commissioner of Lands, 1909, and Minister of Finance and Agriculture, 1910.
