= Keremeos Columns Provincial Park =

Provincial park in British Columbia, Canada

- IUCN category III (natural monument or feature)
- Location within British Columbia
- Interactive map of Keremeos Columns Provincial Park
- Location: British Columbia, Canada
- Nearest city: Keremeos
- Coordinates: 49°14′58″N 119°47′23″W
- Area: 0.2 km^{2} (0.077 sq mi)
- Established: July 31, 1931
- Governing body: BC Parks
- Website: bcparks.ca/keremeos-columns-park/

Keremeos Columns Park is a provincial park in British Columbia, Canada. Established in 1931, the park covers a total area of 20 hectares (49 acres).
