= Stemwinder Provincial Park =

Provincial park in British Columbia, Canada

- IUCN category II (national park)
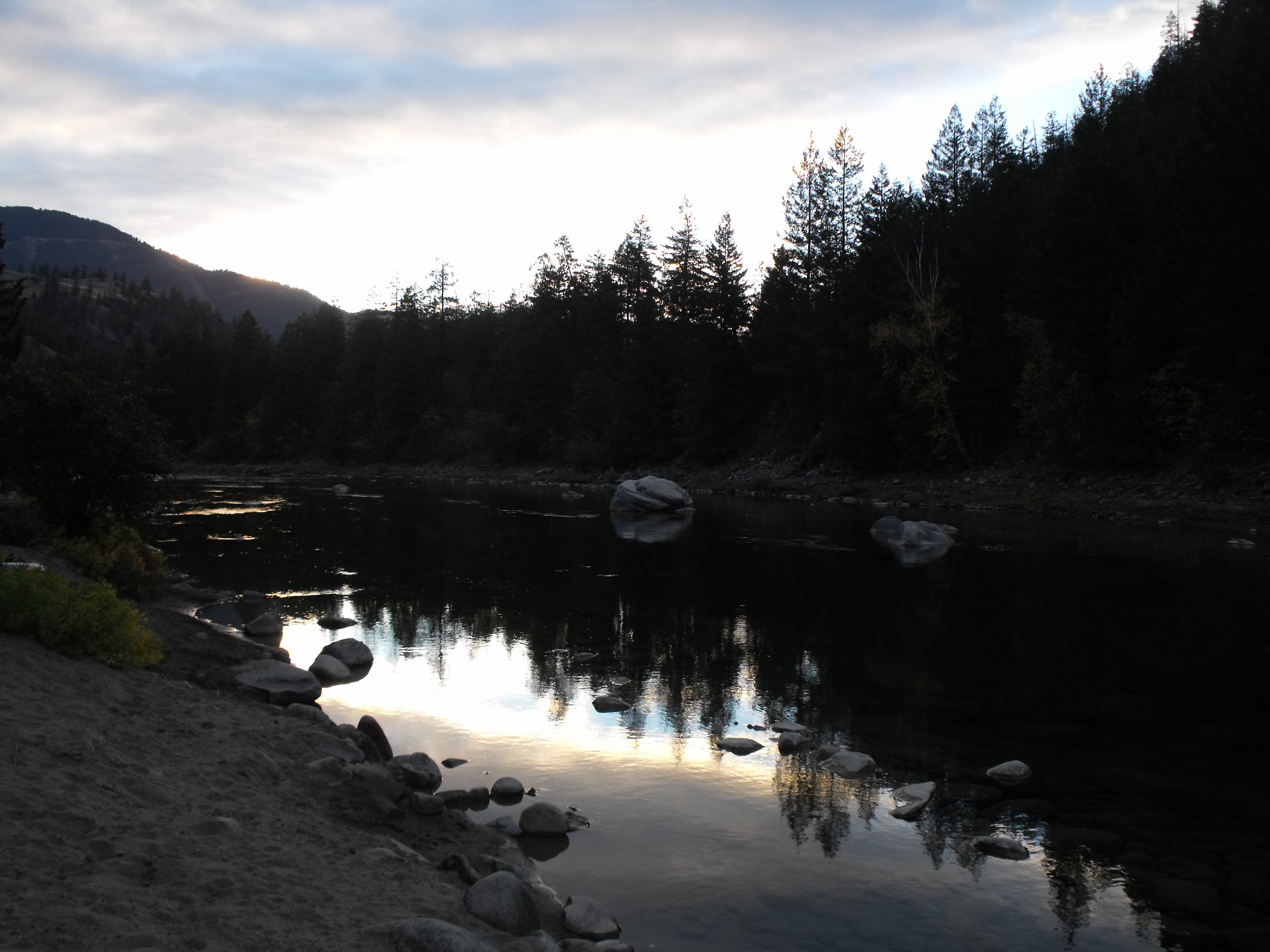
- Panoramic view

- Location within British Columbia
- Interactive map of Stemwinder Provincial Park
- Location: British Columbia, Canada
- Nearest city: Keremeos
- Coordinates: 49°22′15″N 120°08′11″W
- Area: 0.03 km^{2} (0.012 sq mi)
- Established: March 6, 1956; 70 years ago
- Governing body: BC Parks

Stemwinder Provincial Park is a provincial park located just west of Hedley in British Columbia, Canada. The park is 4 hectares (9.9 acres) in size, and provides public access to the Similkameen River.

Documented archaeological sites in the form of rock artifacts and depressions of former pit houses, so-called "pithouses", of the Similkameen (a group of the Okanagan) indicate an early settlement by First Nations and suggest a trading camp here.
