= Truman Dagnus Locheed Park =

Former provincial park in British Columbia, Canada

Coordinates: 50°13′17″N 119°22′30″W

Truman Dagnus Locheed Provincial Park is a former provincial park in British Columbia, Canada, located on the northeast side of Okanagan Lake to the southwest of the city of Vernon. It was transferred to ownership by the town of Vernon in March 2013.
