= Upper Violet Creek Provincial Park =

Canadian provincial park

- IUCN category II (national park)
- Location within British Columbia
- Interactive map of Upper Violet Creek Provincial Park
- Location: British Columbia, Canada
- Nearest city: Salmon Arm
- Coordinates: 50°39′21″N 119°05′52″W
- Governing body: BC Parks

Upper Violet Creek Provincial Park is a provincial park in British Columbia, Canada.
