= Darke Lake Provincial Park =

Provincial park in British Columbia, Canada

Darke Lake Park
- IUCN category II (national park)
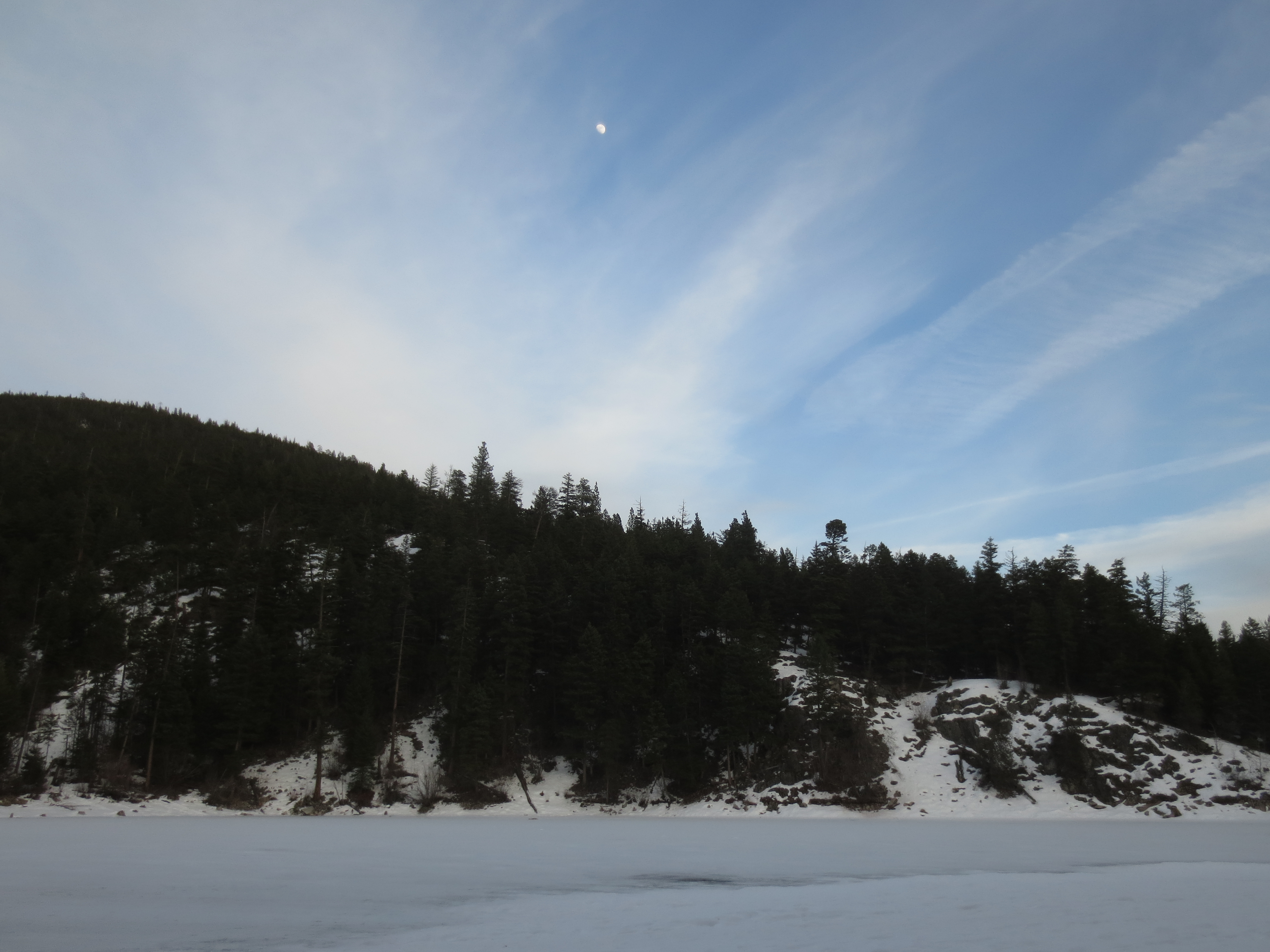
- Moon rises over Darke Lake Provincial Park on a Late Winter Evening

- Location within British Columbia
- Interactive map of Darke Lake Park
- Location: Canada
- Coordinates: 49°44′00″N 119°52′00″W
- Area: 1,470 ha (5.7 sq mi)
- Established: 1968
- Governing body: BC Parks

Darke Lake Provincial Park is a provincial park in British Columbia, Canada located west of Okanagan Lake, southwest of the town of Peachland in that province's Okanagan region. The park is approximately 1,470 hectares (3,600 acres) in size and was established in 1968 as a provincial park Darke Lake, also mapped historically as Fish Lake, is northwest of Summerland and is named after Silas Robert Darke, an early settler in the 1890s. In 1941 Howard Clark bought Fish Lake from Clyde Stewart. He was a hunting and fishing guide that ran the camp, as well as raised four children with his wife Hazel. The children were Betty, Roger, Dale & Audrey. In 1959 he sold it to Jake and Betty Enns.

== Images ==
Overlooking Driftwood on a Late Winter Evening at Darke Lake
