= Sun-Oka Beach Provincial Park =

Provincial park in British Columbia, Canada

Sun-Oka Beach
- IUCN category II (national park)
- Mouth of Trout Creek during winter
- Location within British Columbia
- Interactive map of Sun-Oka Beach
- Location: British Columbia, Canada
- Coordinates: 49°33′49″N 119°37′52″W
- Area: 30 ha (74 acres)
- Established: 1969
- Operator: BC Parks

Sun-Oka Beach Provincial Park is a provincial park in British Columbia, Canada. Established as Claybanks Beach Park in 1969, the park covers a total area of 30 hectares, the park also conserves 558m of shoreline and 100m of Okanagan Lake foreshore.

== Conservation ==
A small portion of rare old growth cottonwood riparian habitat adjacent to Trout Creek is protected. The cottonwoods and associated wetland thickets provide food and shelter for a variety of birds, insects and small mammals. Birds seen in the area include the northern oriole, warbling vireos and the Lewis's woodpecker.
