= Skaha Bluffs Provincial Park =

Provincial park in British Columbia, Canada

Skaha Bluffs Park
- Aerial view of the South End of Sun Valley at Skaha Bluffs Park
- Location within British Columbia
- Interactive map of Skaha Bluffs Park
- Location: Canada
- Coordinates: 49°26′45″N 119°33′40″W
- Area: 489 ha (1,210 acres)
- Established: 1955
- Website: bcparks.ca/skaha-bluffs-park/

Skaha Bluffs Provincial Park is a provincial park in British Columbia, Canada. Skaha Bluffs lies within the asserted territory of the Okanagan Nation Alliance. World-class climbing opportunities are found at Skaha Bluffs, recreational climbing has been occurring in the area since the 1980s.

== History ==
The greater land area holds tremendous spiritual and cultural significance to the Okanagan Nation. The park was created by the Protected Areas of British Columbia Amendment Act, 2009 with 179 ha of land adjacent to Skaha Lake, south of Penticton. The Protected Areas of British Columbia Amendment Act, 2010 added more land to the park, making it a total of 489 ha.

== Images ==
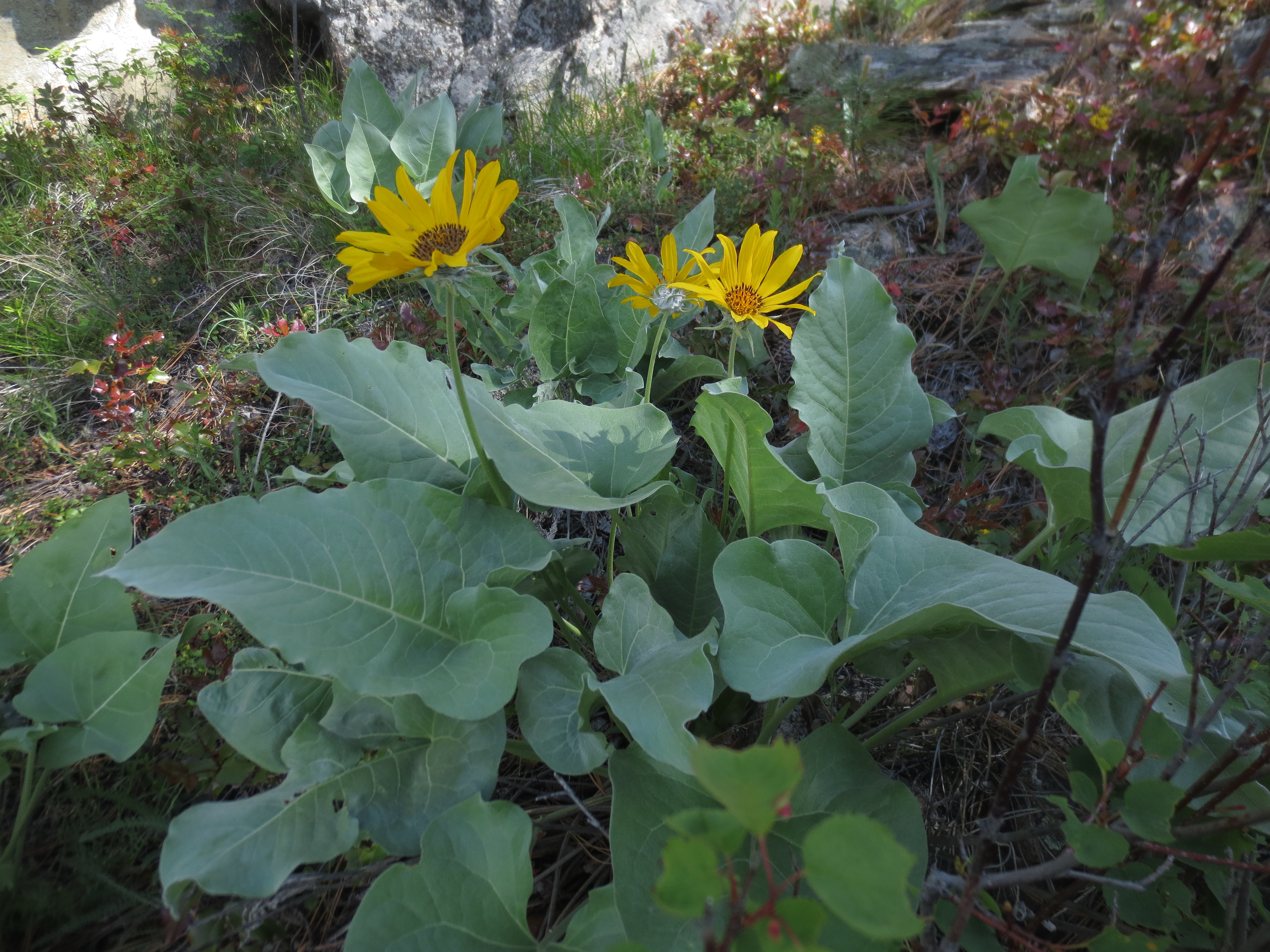
Okanagan Sunflowers in Skaha Bluffs Park

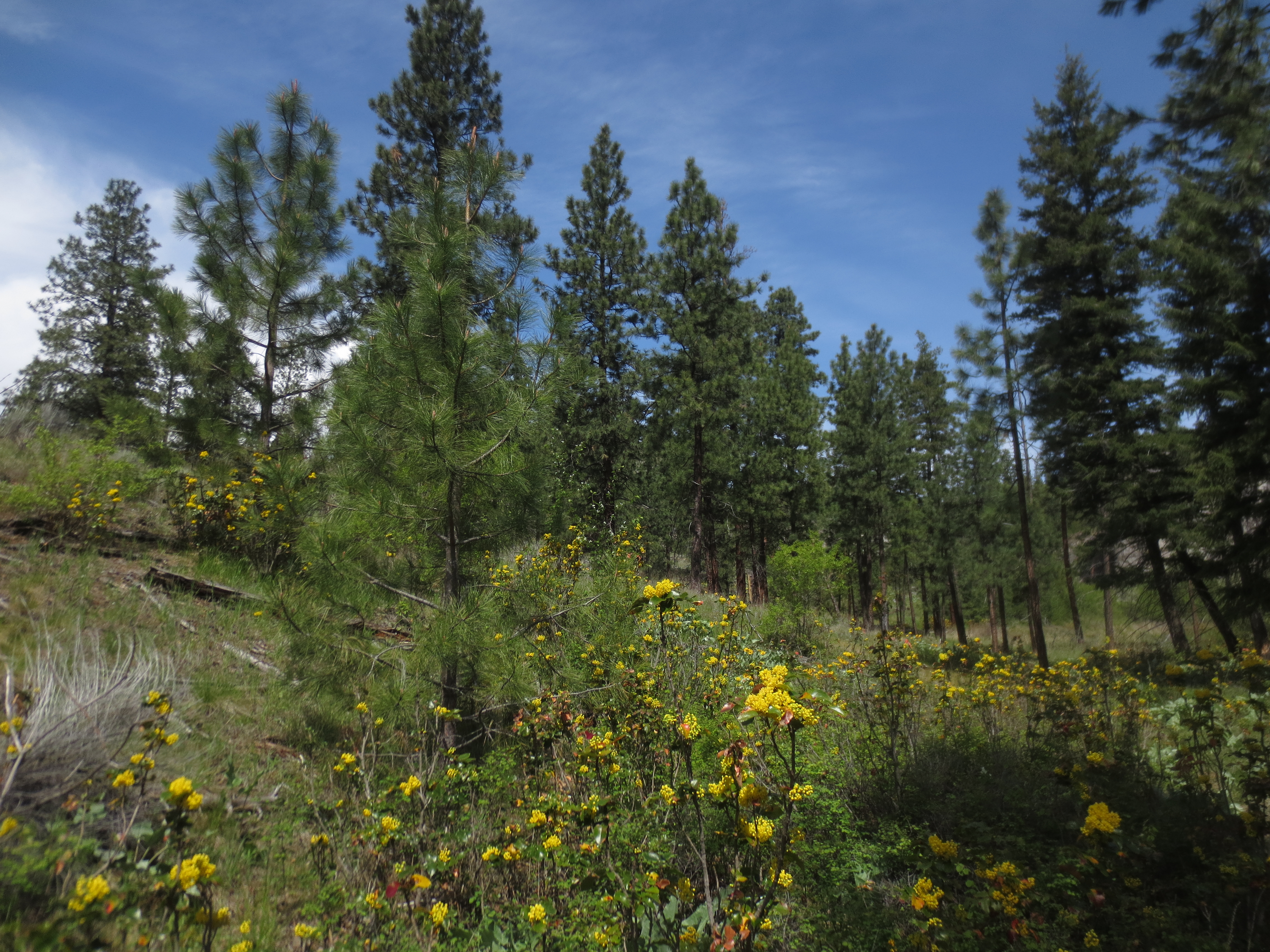
Oregon Grape flowering in the shade of Ponderosa Pines at Skaha Bluffs Park

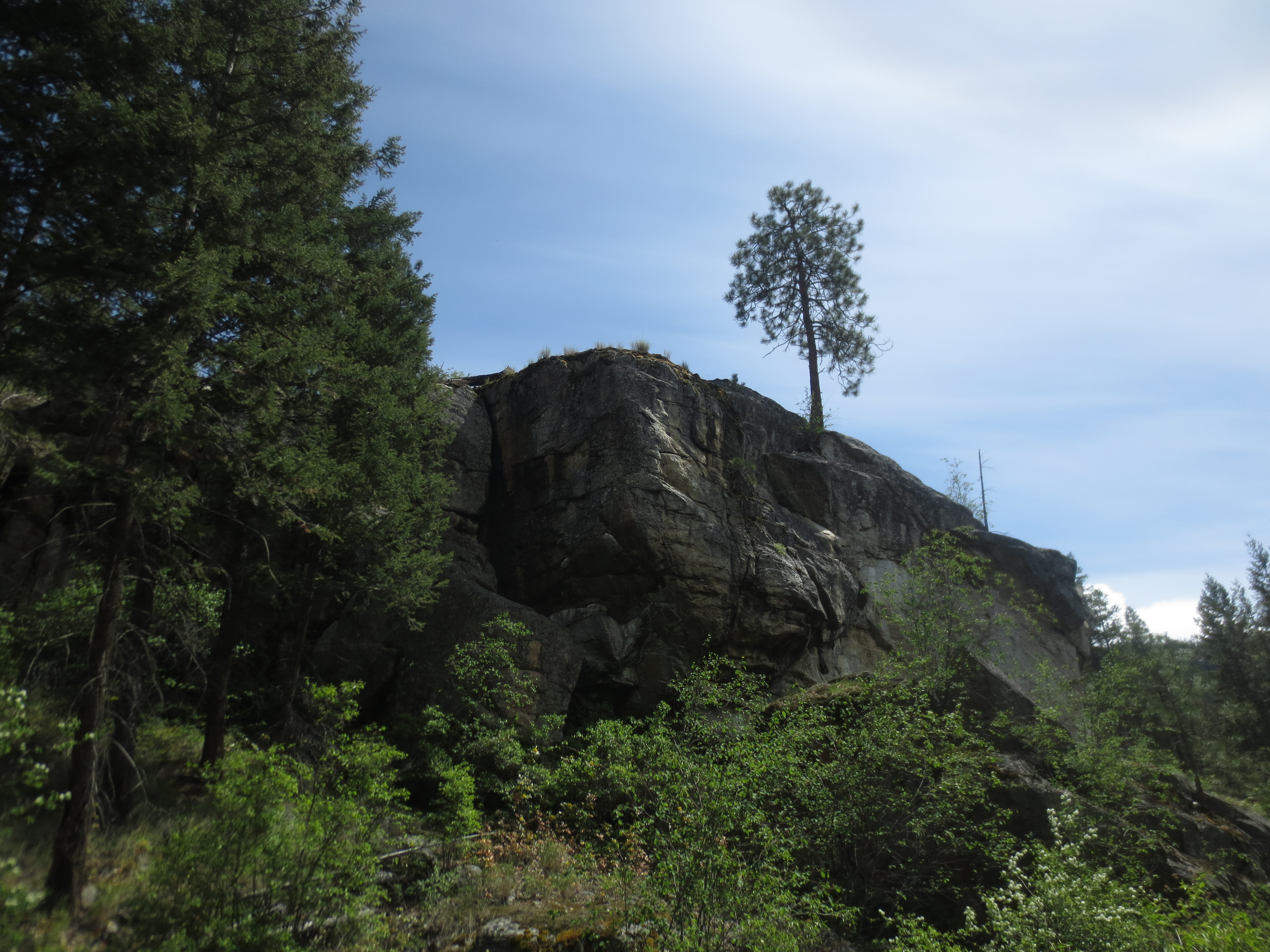
Maverick Ponderosa Pine atop an outcrop in Skaha Bluffs Provincial Park
