= Wrinkly Face Provincial Park =

Canadian provincial park

- IUCN category II (national park)
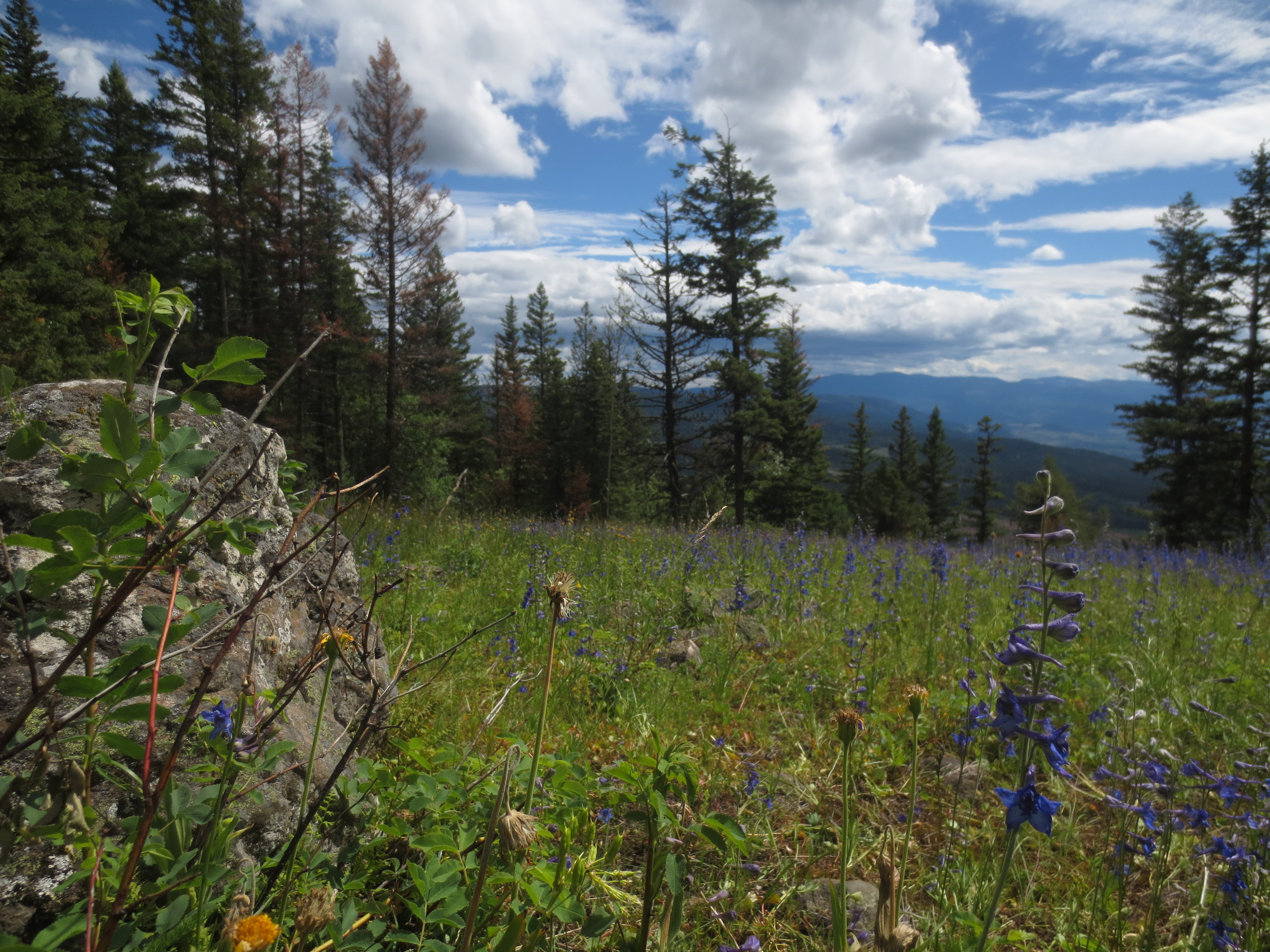
- Field of Wildflowers in Wrinkly Face Provincial Park

- Location within British Columbia Location within Regional District of Central Okanagan
- Interactive map of Wrinkly Face Provincial Park
- Location: Central Okanagan, British Columbia, Canada
- Nearest city: Kelowna, Canada
- Coordinates: 50°2′24″N 119°18′38″W
- Area: 43 ha (110 acres)
- Established: 20 May 2004
- Governing body: BC Parks
- Website: Wrinkly Face Provincial Park

Wrinkly Face Provincial Park is a provincial park 16 kilometres north of Winfield in British Columbia, Canada. Access to the park is limited, and there are no motorized vehicles allowed inside its boundaries. The name of the park, Wrinkly Face, refers to the appearance of the basalt cliffs that are located in it.

== History ==
Wrinkly Face Park was established on May 20, 2004. It was established to protect its meadows, which are sensitive and unique in their makeup, along with the Douglas fir trees.

For thousands of years, the area in and around Wrinkly Face has been home to the Syilx First Nations.

== Geography ==
The park is 43 hectares in size. It encompasses a southern-facing cliff along with a series of dry meadows above the cliff and wetter meadows below. These meadows are exceptionally fragile. The cliff edge provides views of Okanagan Lake and the land toward Kelowna. The High Rim Trail passes through the park along the upper edge of the cliff.

== Conservation ==
The primary role of Wrinkly Face Park is to protect the series of dry meadows at the top of the cliff and the wetter meadows at its base, along with the interior Douglas fir forest. The dry, seasonally-wet, diverse meadows are extremely fragile.

Five red/blue-listed vascular plants are known to occur including red-listed Obscure Cryptantha (Cryptantha ambigua) and Needleleaved Navarretia (Navarretia intertexta) and blue-listed Northern Linanthus (Linanthus septentrionalis), False-mermaid (Floerkea proserpinacoides) and Awned Cyperus (Cyperus squarrosus).

== Recreation ==
Wrinkly Face Park provides low-impact recreational opportunities, such as hiking or horseback riding, for nature study and contains part of the regionally-significant 50 km long High Rim Trail.

Rock climbing is also possible here, with upwards of 21 established climbs on basalt cliffs.

== Gallery ==
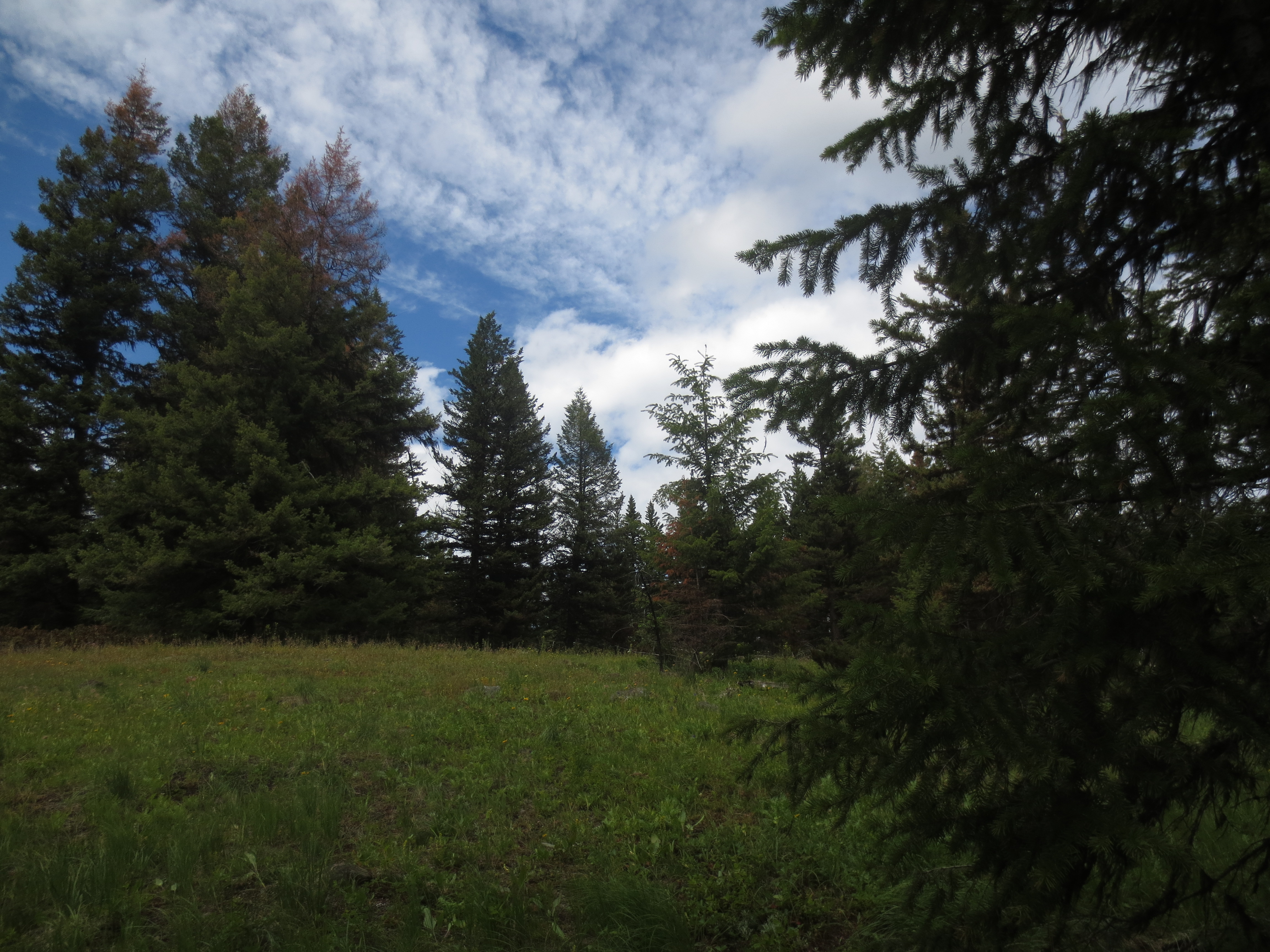
Spruce grove

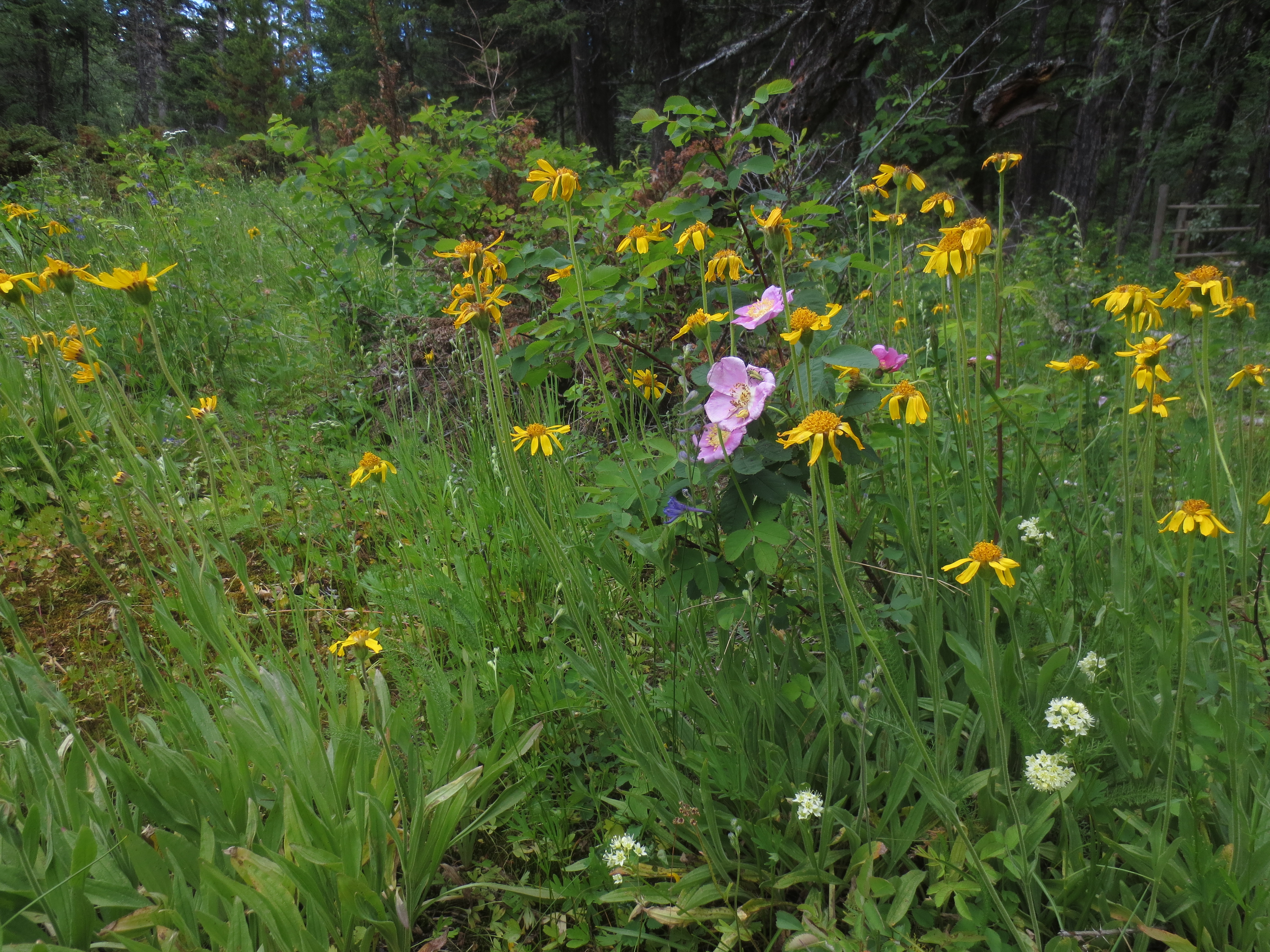
Summer wildflowers

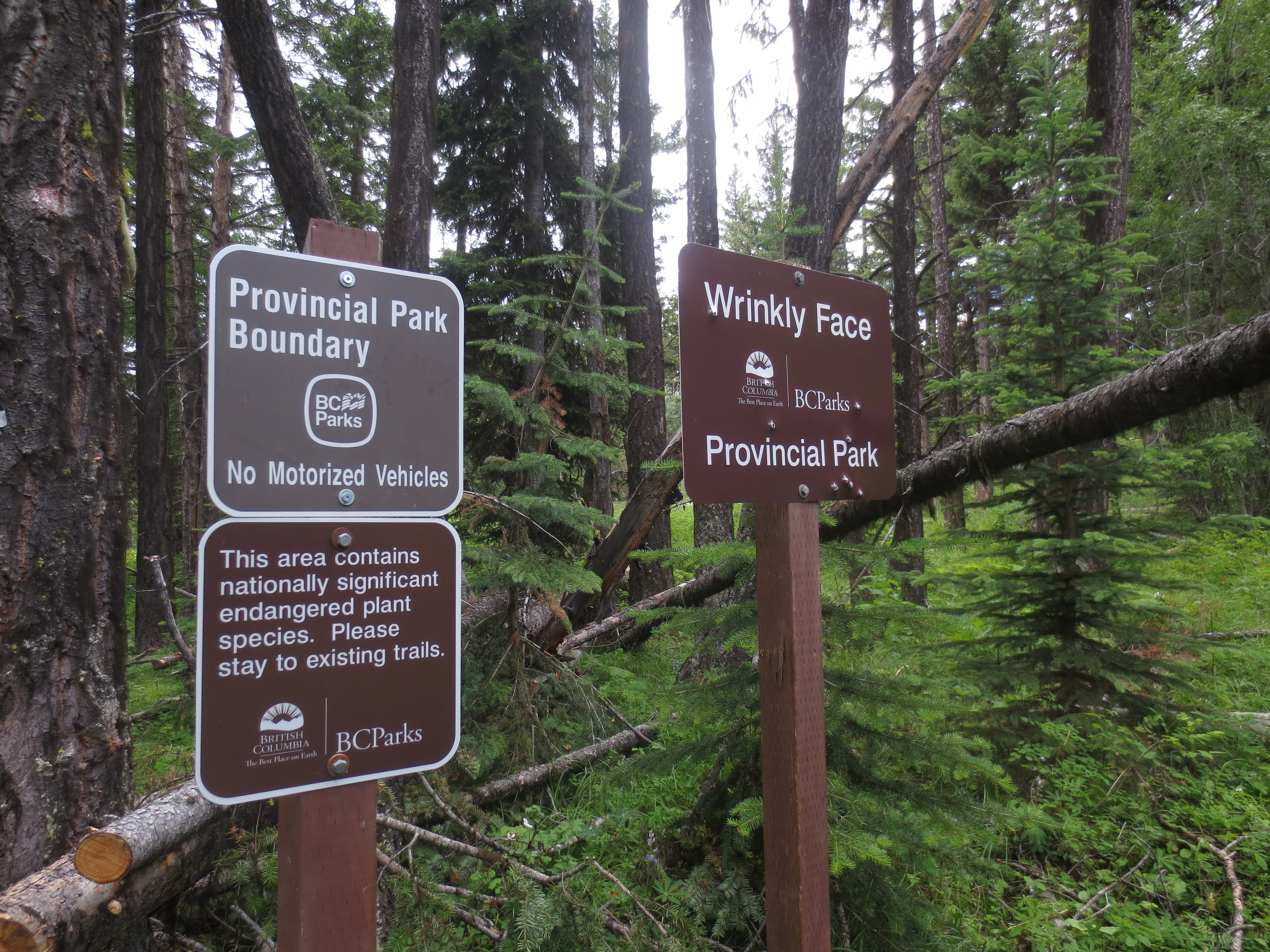
Southern boundary signs

Wildflowers video clip

== See also ==
- List of British Columbia Provincial Parks
- List of Canadian provincial parks
