= Okanagan Lake Provincial Park =

Provincial park in British Columbia, Canada

Okanagan Lake Park
- IUCN category II (national park)
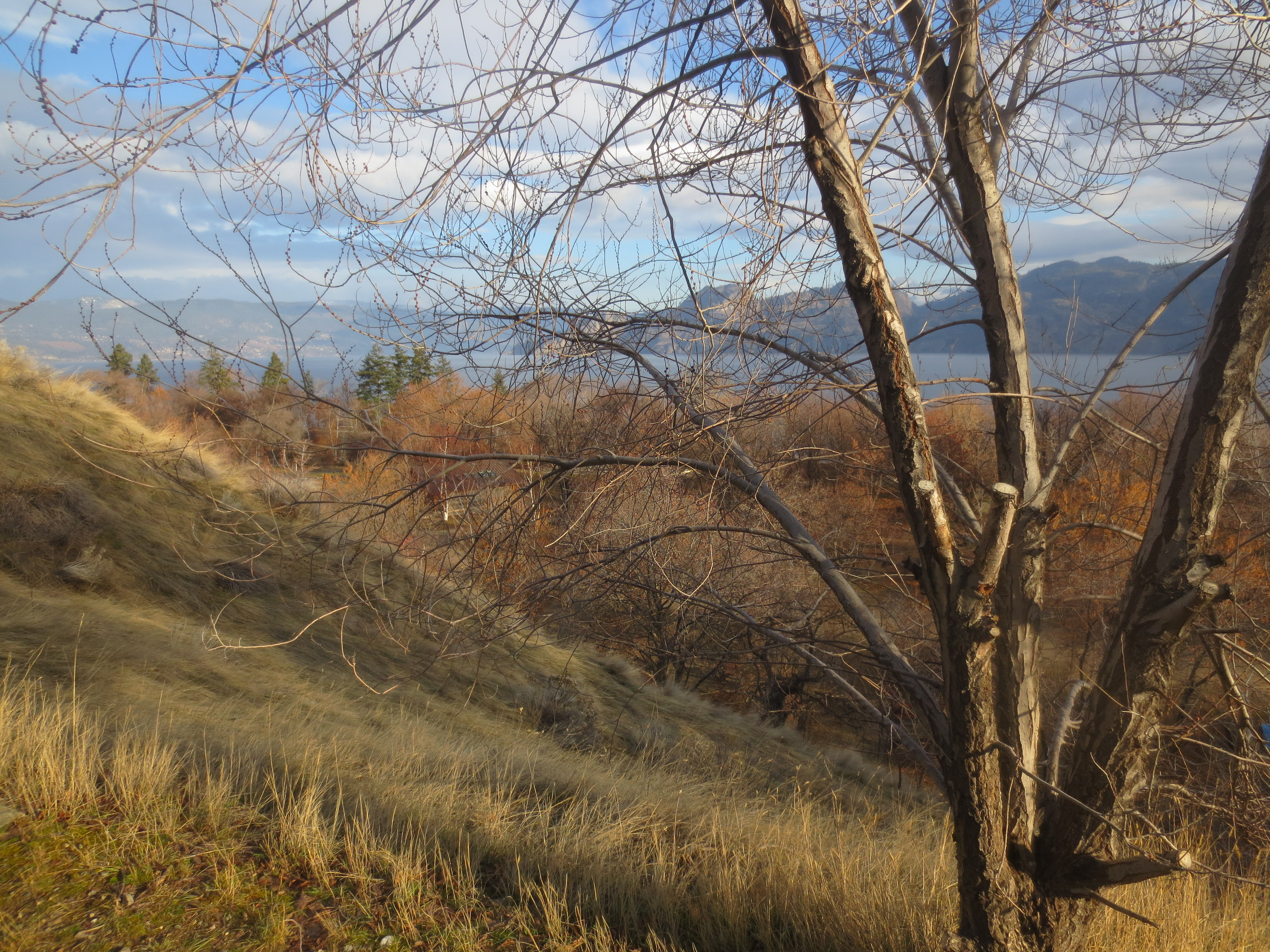
- Winter morning at Okanagan Lake Provincial Park

- Location within British Columbia
- Interactive map of Okanagan Lake Park
- Location: Canada
- Coordinates: 49°41′11″N 119°43′37″W
- Area: 98 ha (240 acres)
- Established: 1955
- Visitors: 177,514 (in 2017-18)
- Operator: BC Parks

Okanagan Lake Provincial Park is a provincial park in British Columbia, Canada. Established in 1955, the park covers a total area of 98 hectares (240 acres).

== History ==
Okanagan Lake Provincial Park is not only known for its native flora but for the successful introduction of non-native flora. A few years after its creation, thousands of non-native trees were planted in the park, especially in barren slopes. The saplings have grown into large trees, filling the area between the highway and the lake, and providing a haven to several bird species.

== Flora ==
This area is a mix of grasslands, which are usually in the lower sections, and forests of ponderosa pine and Douglas fir that cover the upper sections of the park. Wildflowers such as chocolate lily and the Columbia lily also grow here.

== Fauna ==
Many colonies of Columbian ground squirrel inhabit the park. There are also the docile and harmless gopher snakes, which often appear near the hiking trails. There is also a good population of bats in the park. There are also amphibian species here, such as the western toad and western painted turtle. The park's birdlife is also rich with birds such as cedar waxwings, quail, northern shafted flickers, western meadowlarks, hummingbirds and the Lewis's woodpecker.

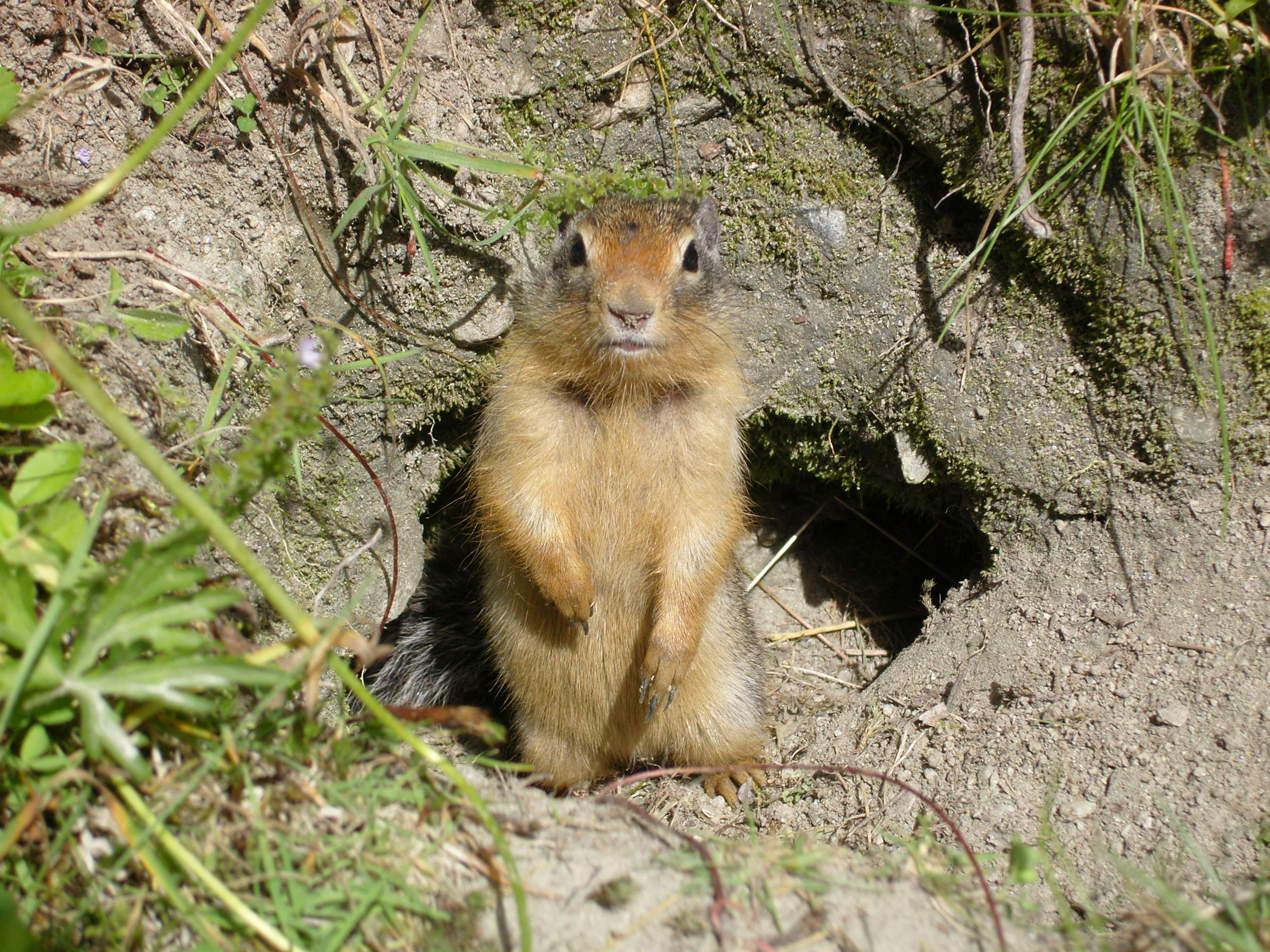
A Columbian ground squirrel, one of the park's residents.

== Gallery ==
Winter morning on the South Beach
