= Trepanier Provincial Park =

Provincial park in British Columbia, Canada

Trepanier Park
- IUCN category II (national park)
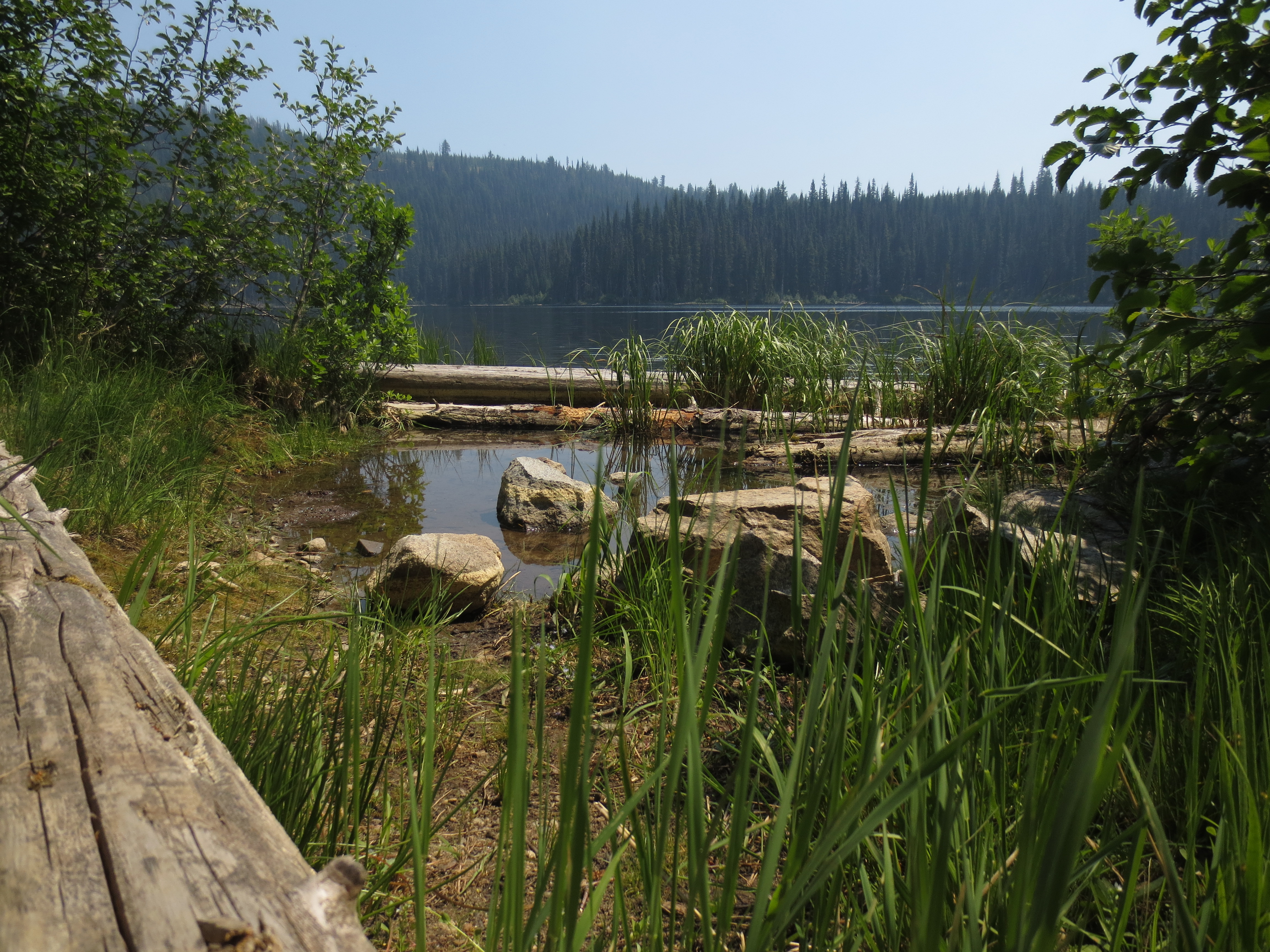
- Summer Afternoon at the Edge of Cameron Lake

- Location within British Columbia Location within Regional District of Central Okanagan
- Interactive map of Trepanier Park
- Location: Central Okanagan, British Columbia, Canada
- Nearest city: West Kelowna
- Coordinates: 49°54′53″N 119°51′28″W
- Area: 2,884 ha (11.14 sq mi)
- Established: 2001
- Governing body: BC Parks

Trepanier Provincial Park is a provincial park in British Columbia, Canada. This 2,884-hectare (11.14 sq mi) park is roughly 24 km west of Kelowna.

Trepanier Provincial Park was established on April 18, 2001, to protect important water, biodiversity and recreation values, including the Trepanier Creek drainage. The park includes the Cameron Lake area which is a small fishing lake pleasantly surrounded by mature forest and regenerating stands. The north and west shorelines have been regenerating after a 1970 wildfire and salvage logging.

== Images ==
Traversing Wetlands in Trepanier Provincial Park

Descending through the Haze of Distant Fires to Cameron Lake's Wetlands
