= Nickel Plate Provincial Park =

Provincial park in British Columbia, Canada

Nickel Plate Park
- IUCN category II (national park)
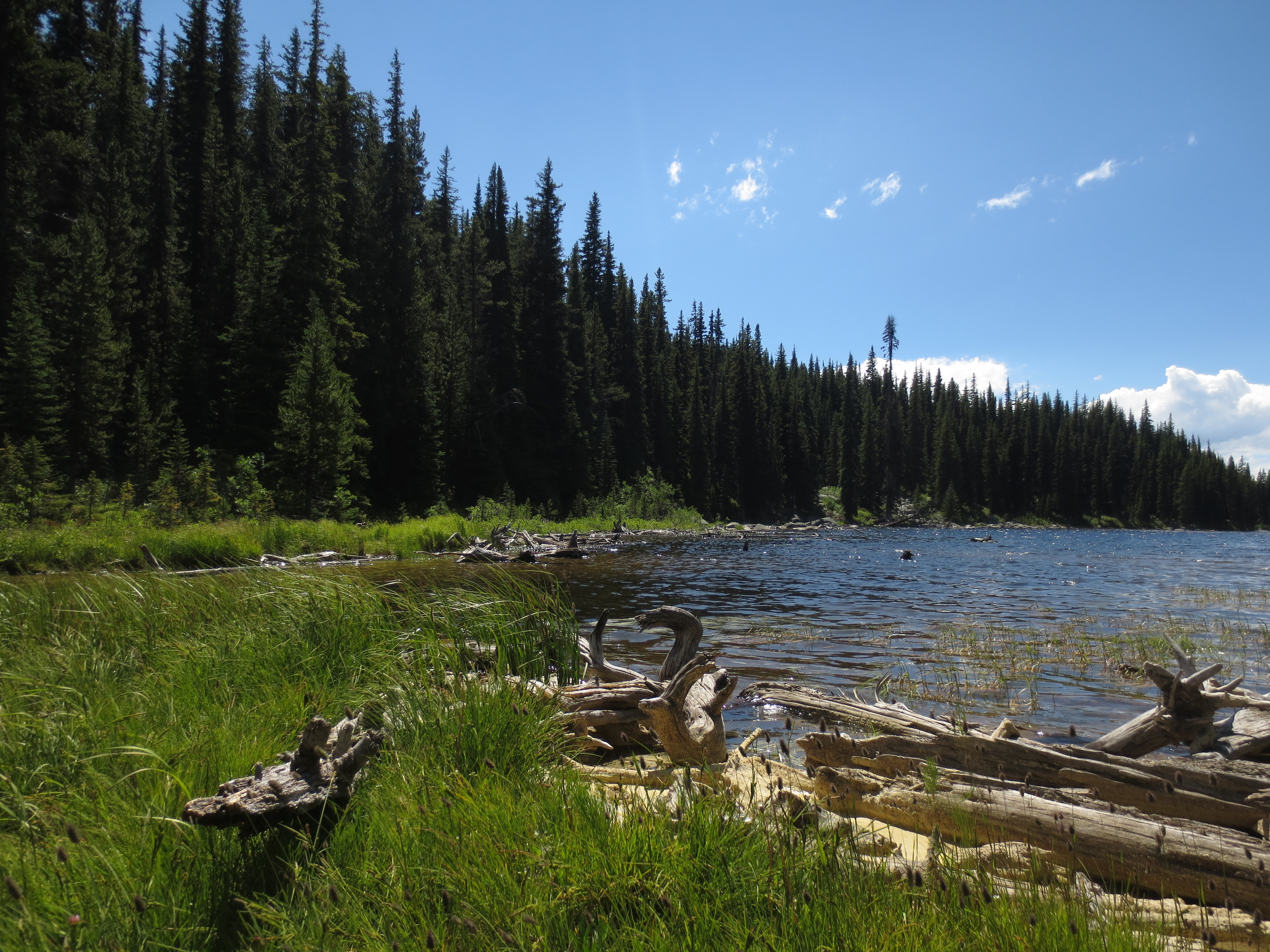
- Summer Afternoon in Nickel Plate Park

- Location within British Columbia
- Interactive map of Nickel Plate Park
- Location: Okanagan-Similkameen, British Columbia, Canada
- Coordinates: 49°24′17″N 119°56′52″W
- Area: 105 ha (260 acres)
- Established: 1938
- Operator: BC Parks

Nickel Plate Provincial Park is a provincial park in British Columbia, Canada. Formerly known as Clearwater Park, it is located in the Similkameen District at the northeast corner of Nickel Plate Lake. The park is also 29km northeast of Hedley near the Apex Ski Resort.

Campers can be found on the lake's sandy beaches and are expected to practice "no trace" camping. Boat access to the lake is available by a rough gravel boat launch at the north end of the dam. In addition, the Nickel Plate Nordic Centre in Nickel Plate Provincial Park features 39km of groomed and track-set trails.

The park has recreational activities including hiking, fishing, paddling, canoeing and kayaking as well as winter recreation.

The nearby regions & towns:

- Hedley
- Penticton
- Summerland
- Keremeos

== Images ==
The wind playing with grasses by a stream in Nickel Plate Park.webm

== See also ==
- List of British Columbia Provincial Parks
- List of Canadian provincial parks
