= Osoyoos Division Yale Land District =

Land district in British Columbia, Canada

Coordinates: 50.0459°N 119.1000°W

Osoyoos Division Yale Land District is one of the 59 land districts of British Columbia, Canada, which are the underlying cadastral divisions of that province. All land titles and surveys use the Land District system as the primary point of reference, and entries in BC Names for placenames and geographical objects are so listed.

Yale Land District and its four divisions (Yale, Similkameen, Osoyoos and Kamloops Divisions) were created with the rest of those on Mainland British Columbia via the Lands Act of the Colony of British Columbia in 1860. The British Columbia government's BC Names system, a subdivision of GeoBC, defines a land district as "a territorial division with legally defined boundaries for administrative purposes"

It also comments that "Yale Land District" is an incomplete descriptor, and that it is only a loose term, as the four subdivisions are all treated as Land Districts in their own right.

== Description ==
Yale Land District entails all the lands between New Westminster Land District to the west, Lillooet Land District and Cariboo Land District to the north, and Kootenay Land District to the east.

The Osoyoos Division mostly coincides with the region known as the Okanagan, while the other three correspond to the geographic regions of the province under those same names.

== Political boundaries ==
The original electoral districts (also known as "ridings") of British Columbia were based on land district boundaries. The original federal Yale riding and provincial Yale riding corresponded to the whole of this land district; later subdivisions of those large ridings were defined by the Similkameen, Boundary, Kamloops and Osoyoos Divisions.

== See also ==
- Cassiar (disambiguation)
- List of Land Districts of British Columbia
