= Bellhouse Provincial Park =

Provincial park in British Columbia, Canada

- IUCN category II (national park)
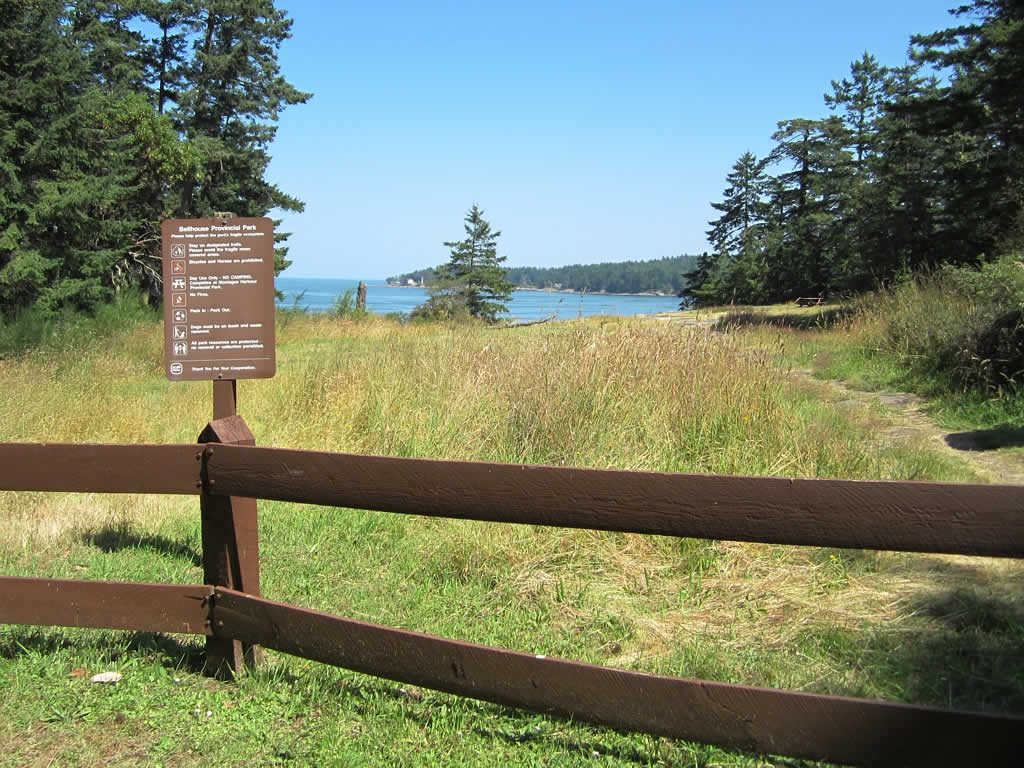

- Location within Vancouver Island Location within British Columbia
- Interactive map of Bellhouse Provincial Park
- Location: Cowichan Land District, British Columbia, Canada
- Nearest city: Duncan, BC
- Coordinates: 48°52′21″N 123°18′45″W
- Area: 2.5 ha (6.2 acres)
- Established: August 21, 1964
- Governing body: BC Parks
- Website: bcparks.ca/bellhouse-park/

Bellhouse Provincial Park is a provincial park in the southern Gulf Islands of British Columbia, Canada. It is located in the Sturdies Bay area of southeastern Galiano Island. It is on land donated by Thorney Bellhouse in 1964, and is noted for its spring wildflowers, notably fawn lilies and chocolate lilies, as well as views of snow-capped mountains and abundant marine life.
