= Montague Harbour Marine Provincial Park =

Provincial park in British Columbia, Canada

- IUCN category II (national park)
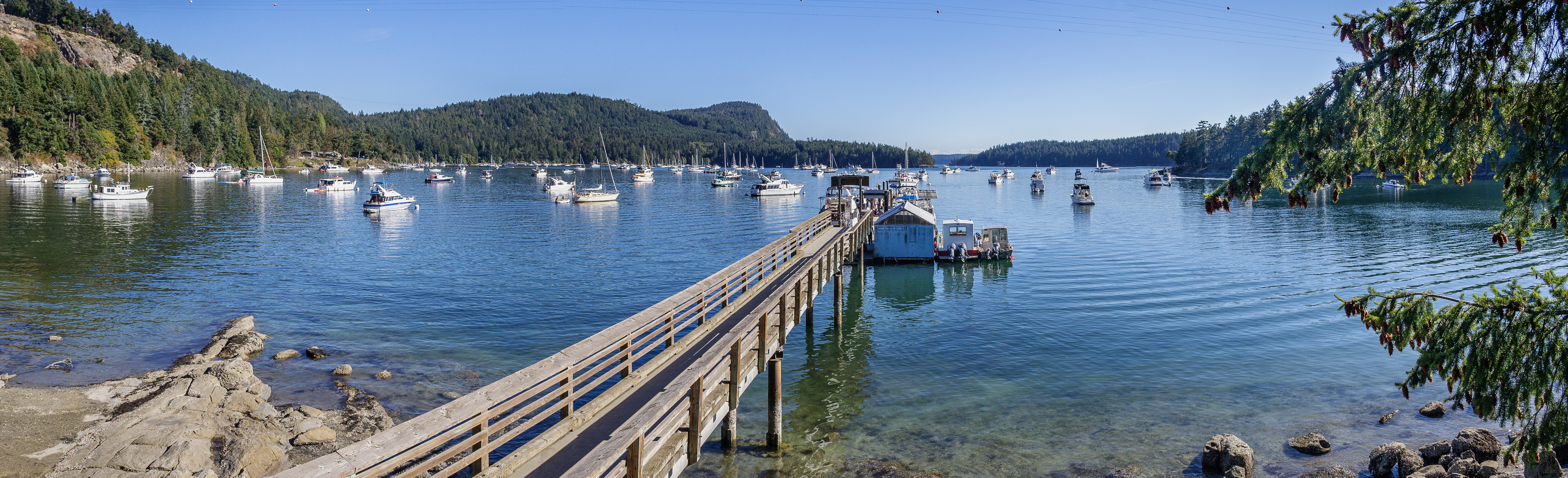
- Panoramic view

- Location within British Columbia
- Interactive map of Montague Harbour Marine Provincial Park
- Location: British Columbia, Canada
- Nearest city: Duncan
- Coordinates: 48°54′02″N 123°24′18″W
- Area: 1.02 km^{2} (0.39 sq mi)
- Established: March 6, 1959
- Governing body: BC Parks
- Website: bcparks.ca/montague-harbour-marine-park/

Montague Harbour Marine Provincial Park is a provincial park in British Columbia, Canada, located on Galiano Island, one of the Gulf Islands off BC's South Coast in Canada. It is accessible by BC Ferries from Swartz Bay on Vancouver Island or Tsawwassen on the Mainland. The Island's ferry terminal is at Sturdies Bay, about 6 km (3.7 mi) from Montague.

== Gallery ==
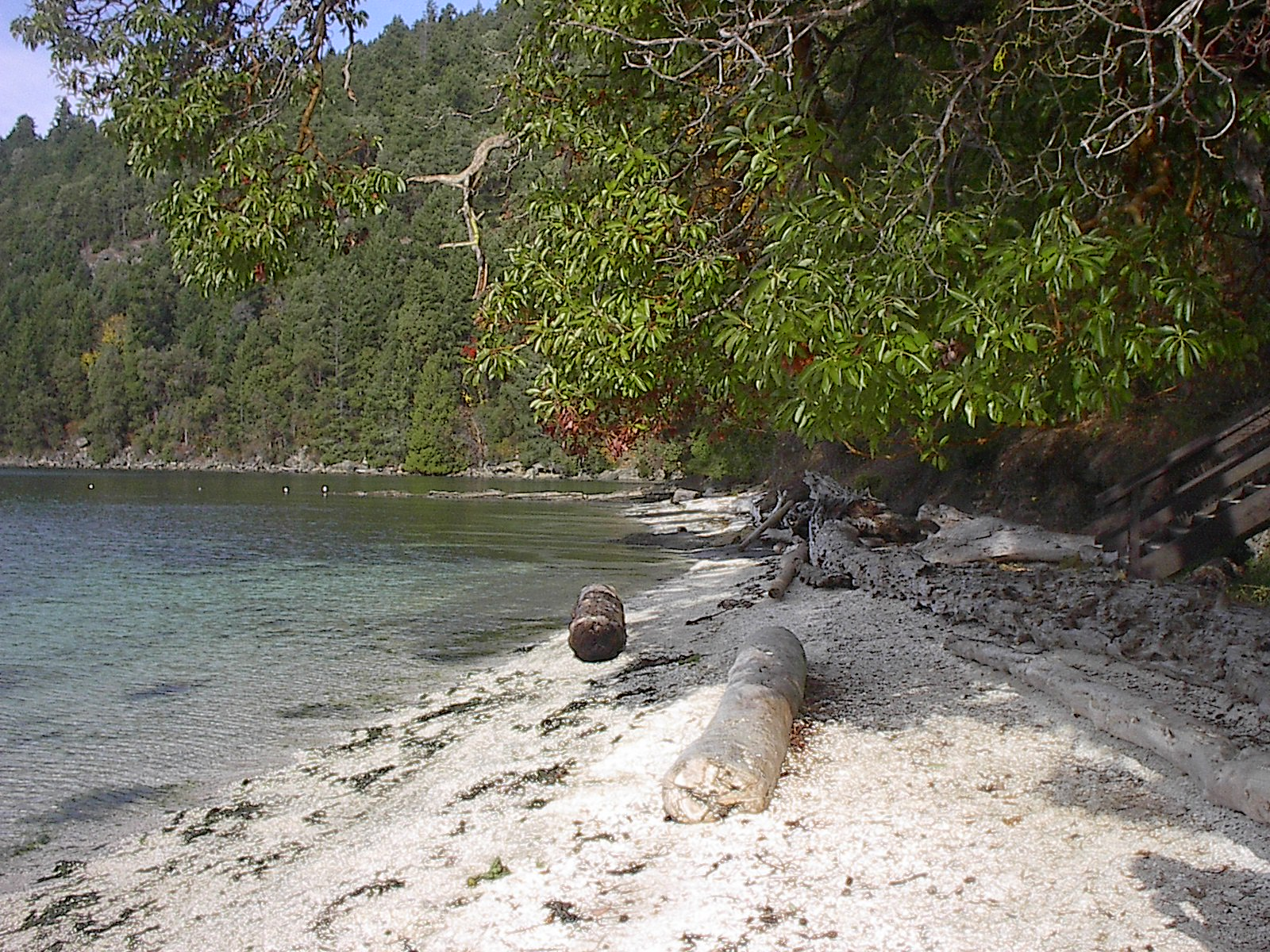
Arbutus menziesii, giant specimen, Montague Harbour Marine Provincial Marine Park

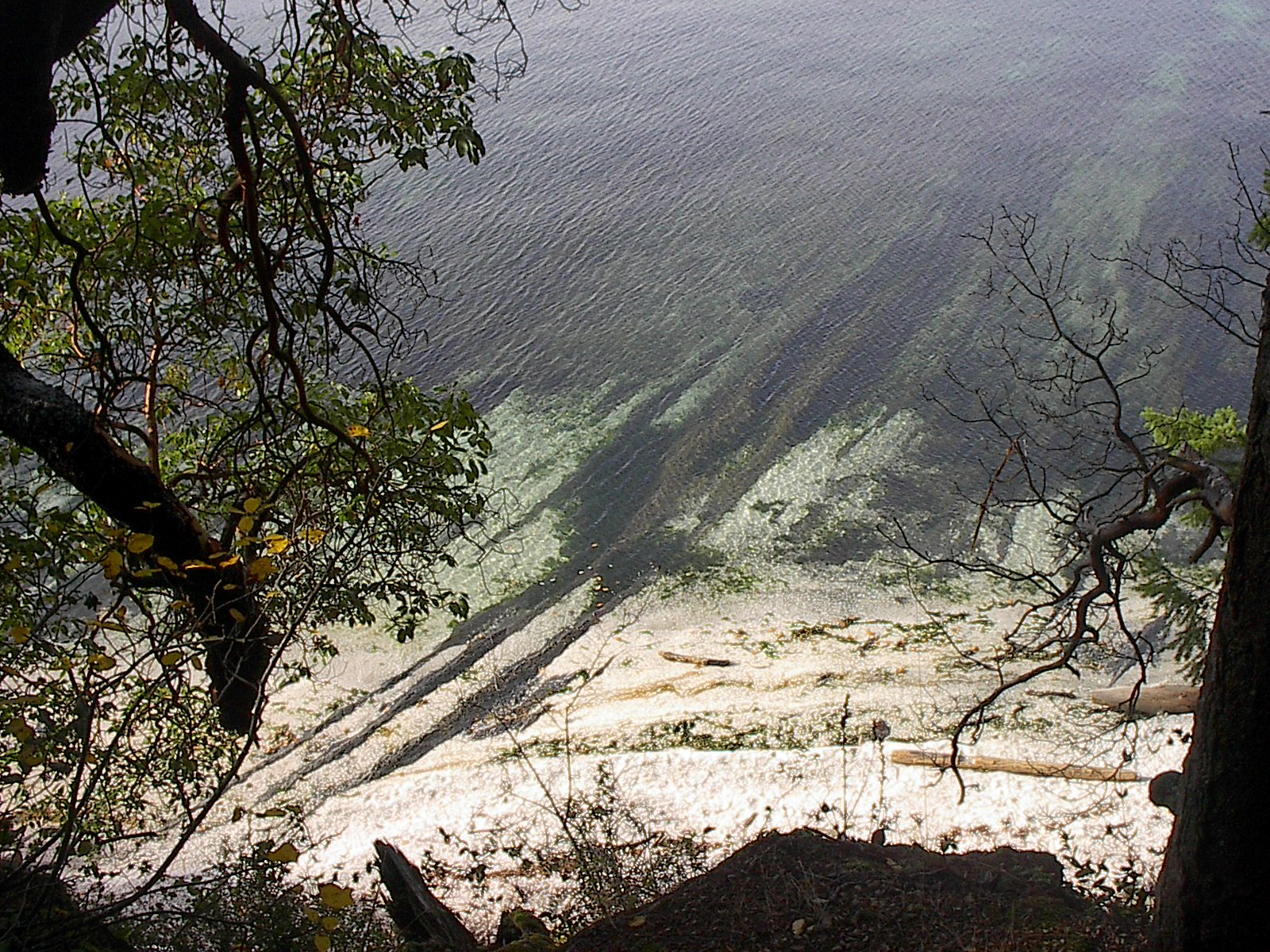
Looking down into reef, Montague Harbour Provincial Marine Park

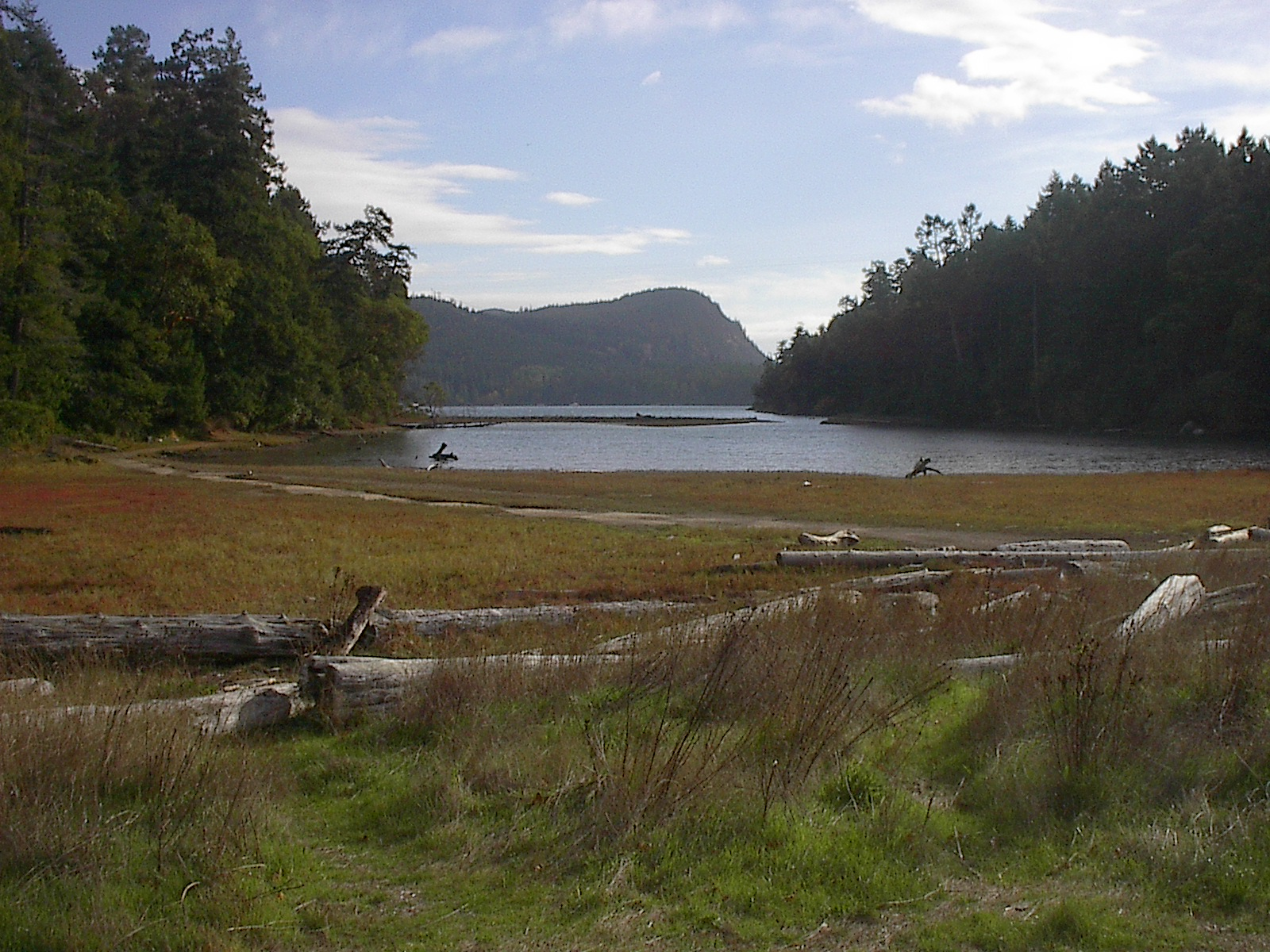
Montague Harbour Provincial Marine Park, tidal lagoon with view of Mt. Sutil

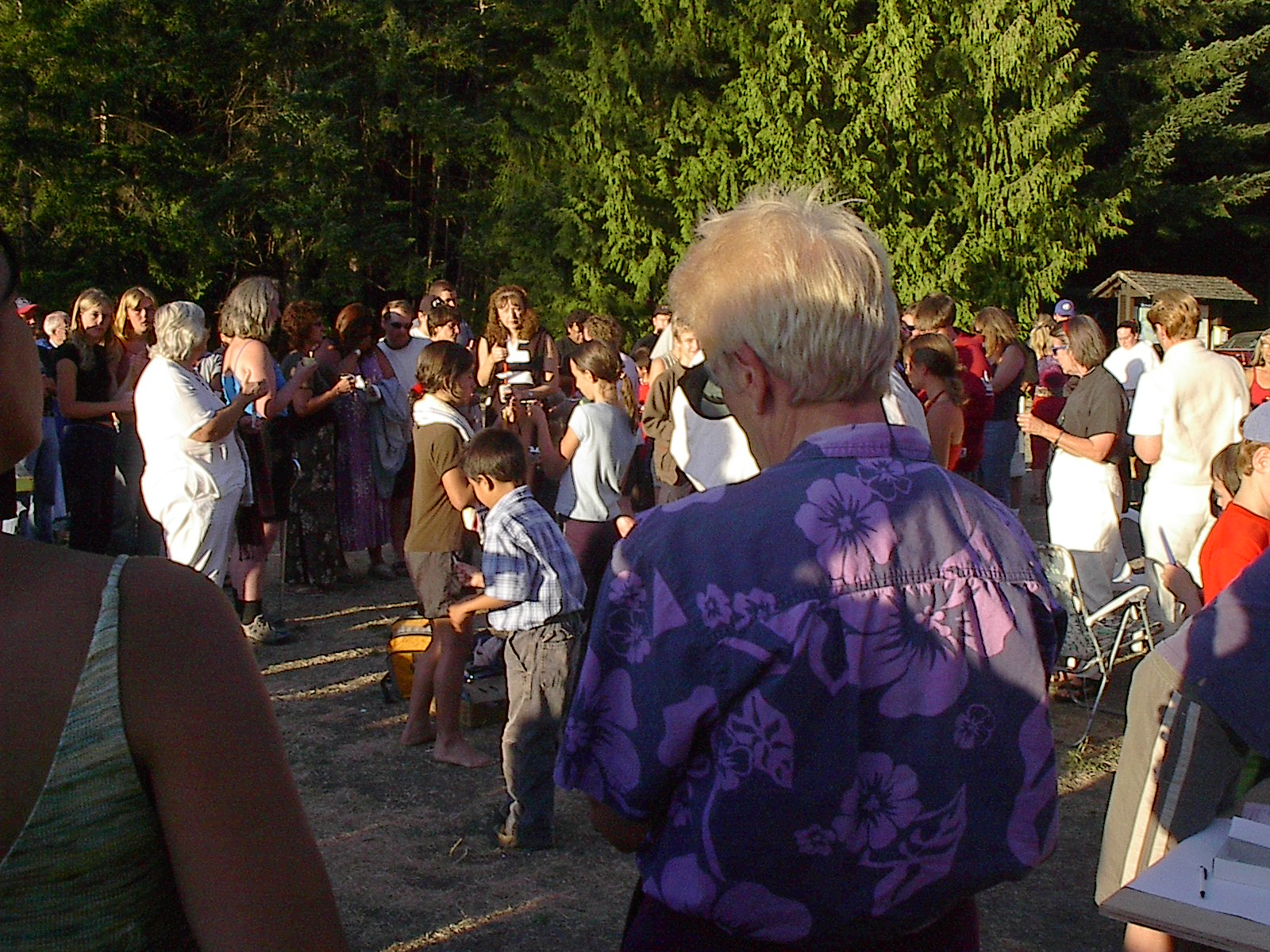
Memorial for Victims of the "Cap Rouge II" Shipwreck at Montague Park

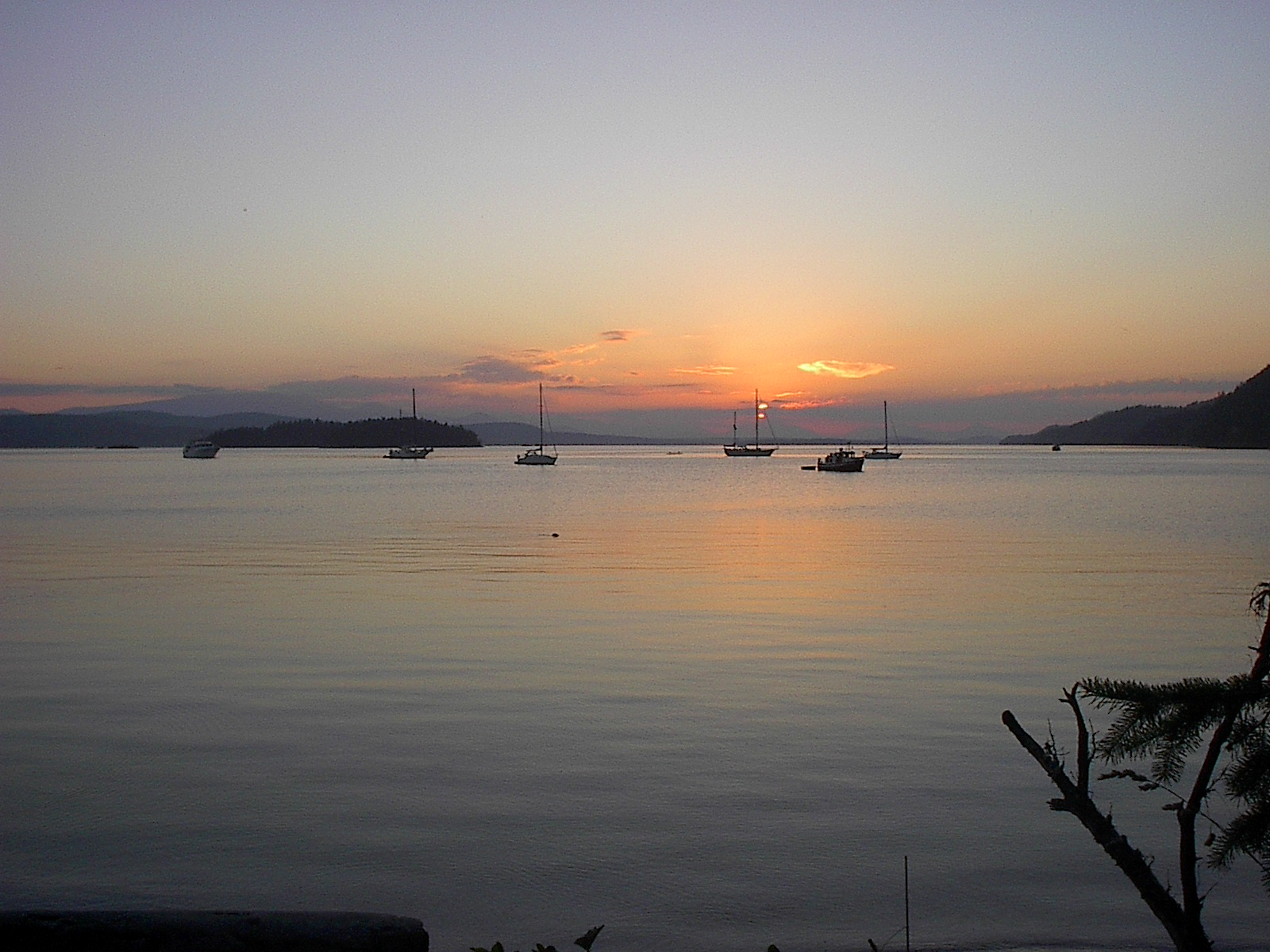
Sunset, Montague Harbour Marine Provincial Marine Park

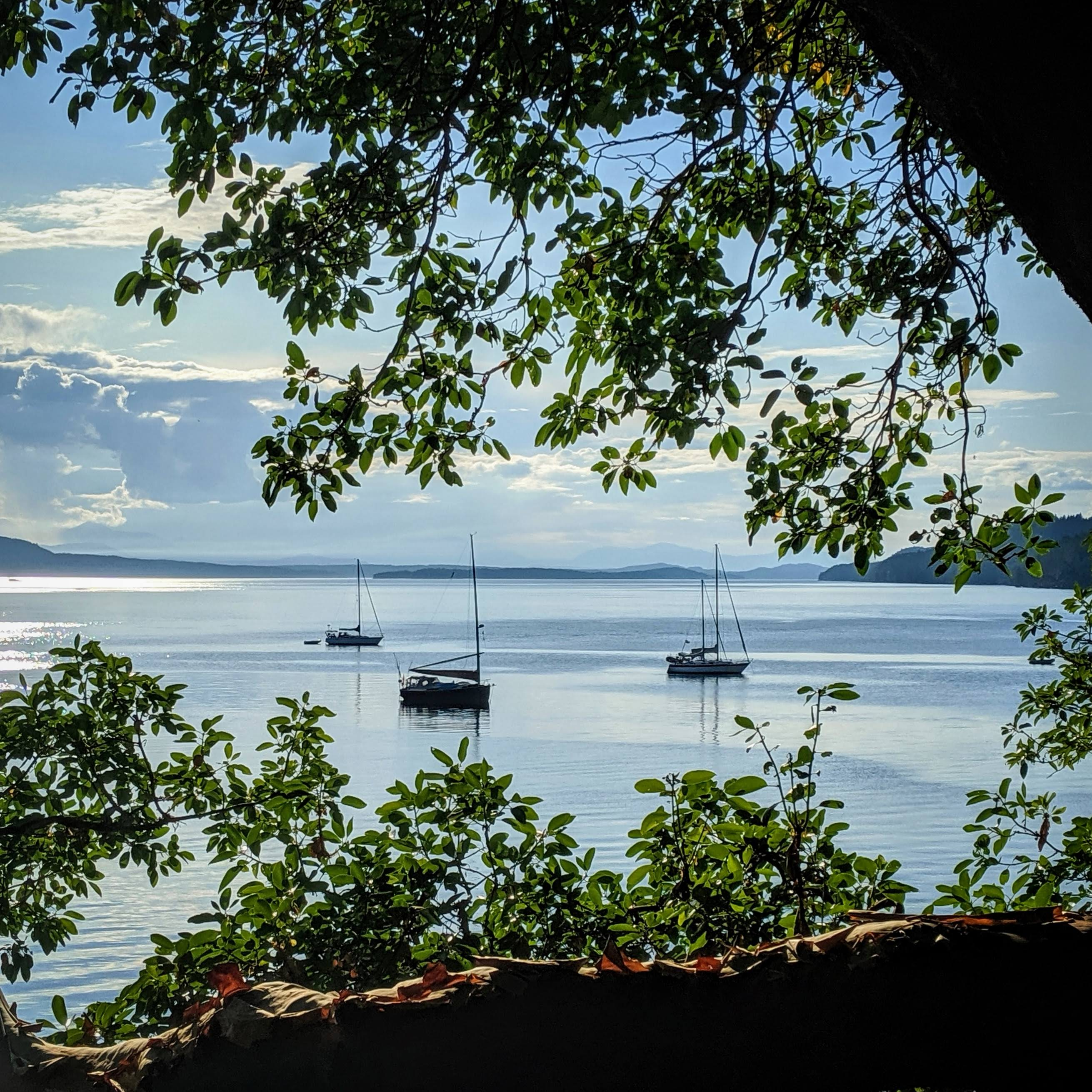
