= Dionisio Point Provincial Park =

Provincial park on Galiano Island in British Columbia, Canada

- IUCN category II (national park)
- Location within Vancouver Island Location within British Columbia
- Interactive map of Dionisio Point Provincial Park
- Location: Cowichan Land District, British Columbia, Canada
- Nearest city: Ladysmith, BC
- Coordinates: 49°00′24″N 123°34′29″W
- Area: 142 ha (350 acres)
- Established: July 31, 1991
- Governing body: BC Parks
- Website: bcparks.ca/dionisio-point-park/

Dionisio Point Provincial Park is a marine-accessed provincial park campground in the southern Gulf Islands of British Columbia, Canada. It is located at the northwestern tip of Galiano Island, across Porlier Pass from Valdes Island.

The park name originates from the arrival of Captain Dionisio Alcalá Galiano on ship Sutil to the Gulf Islands in 1792.

Shell middens and berms in the park indicate human use for at least 3,000 years prior to present day. The park also contains fenced archaeological sites of the Penelakut First Nation.

== Images ==
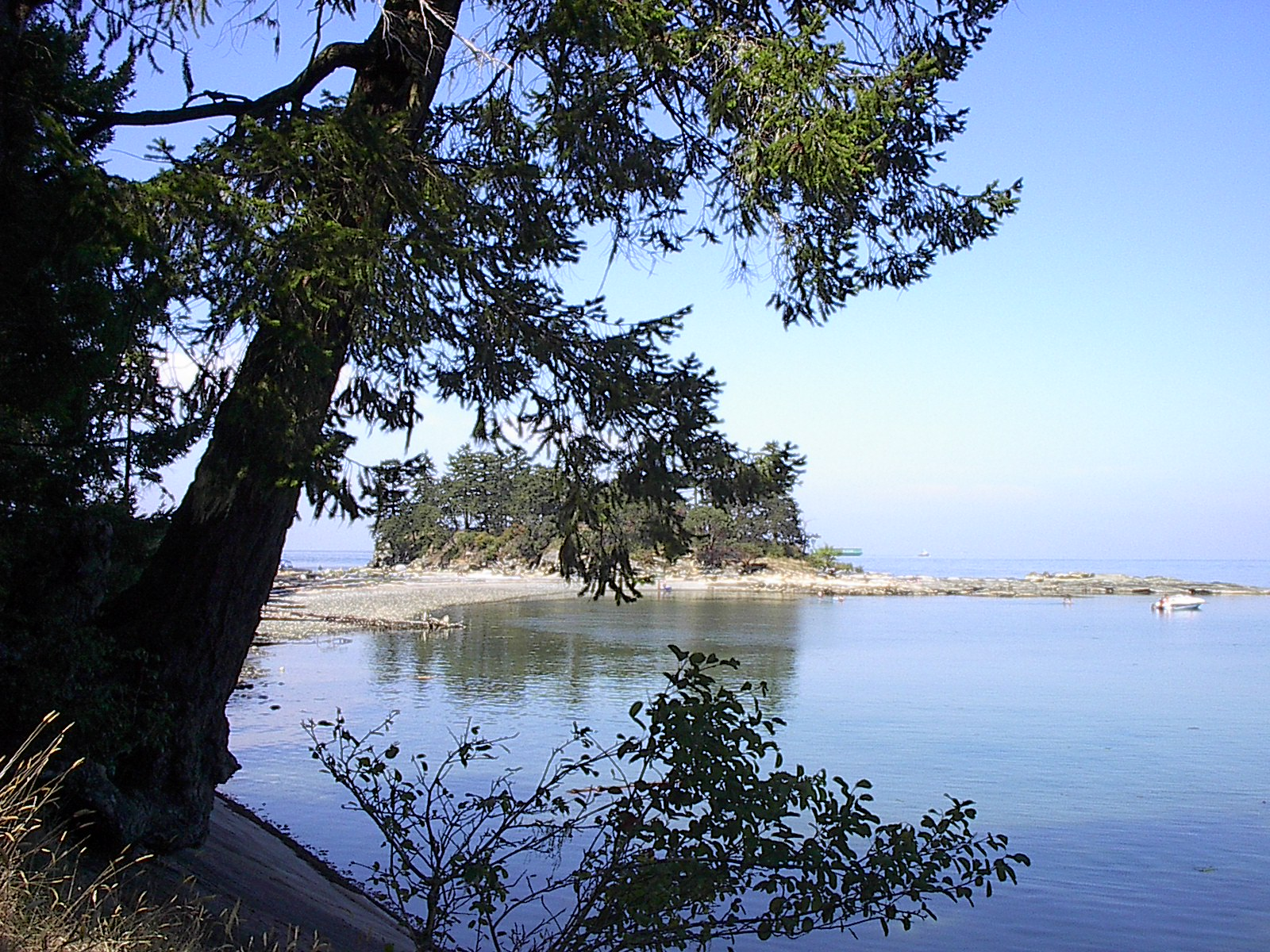
A view of Dionisio Point

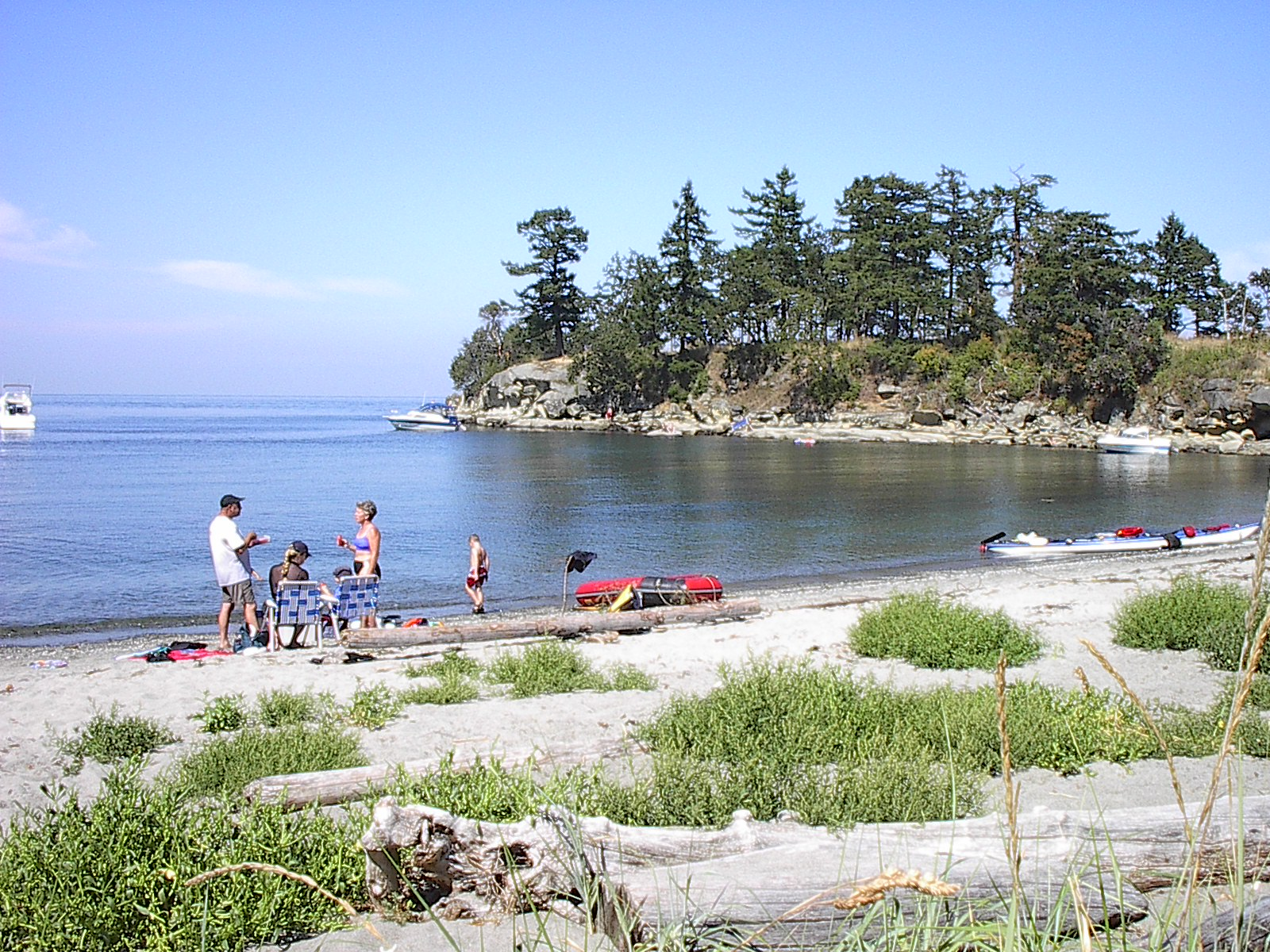
A picnic on the beach

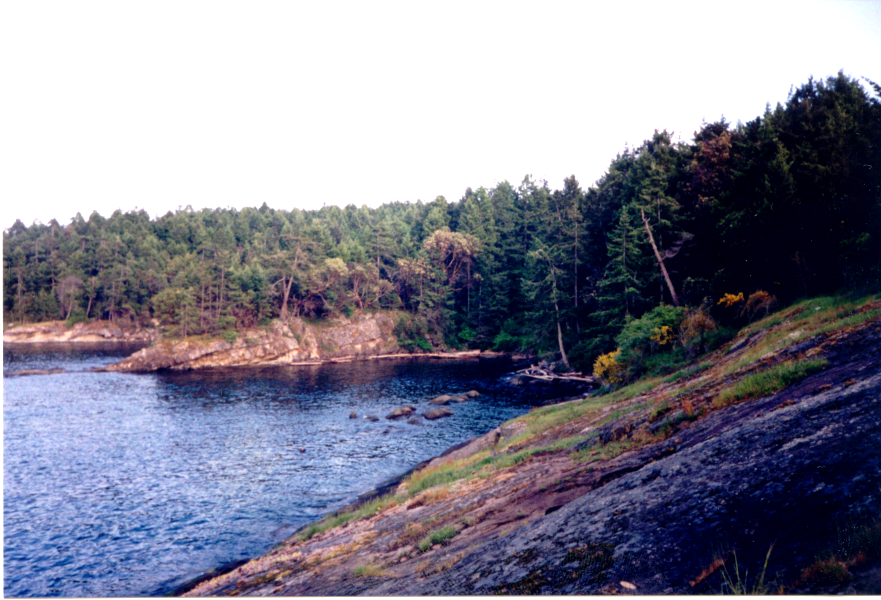
Porlier Pass cliffs

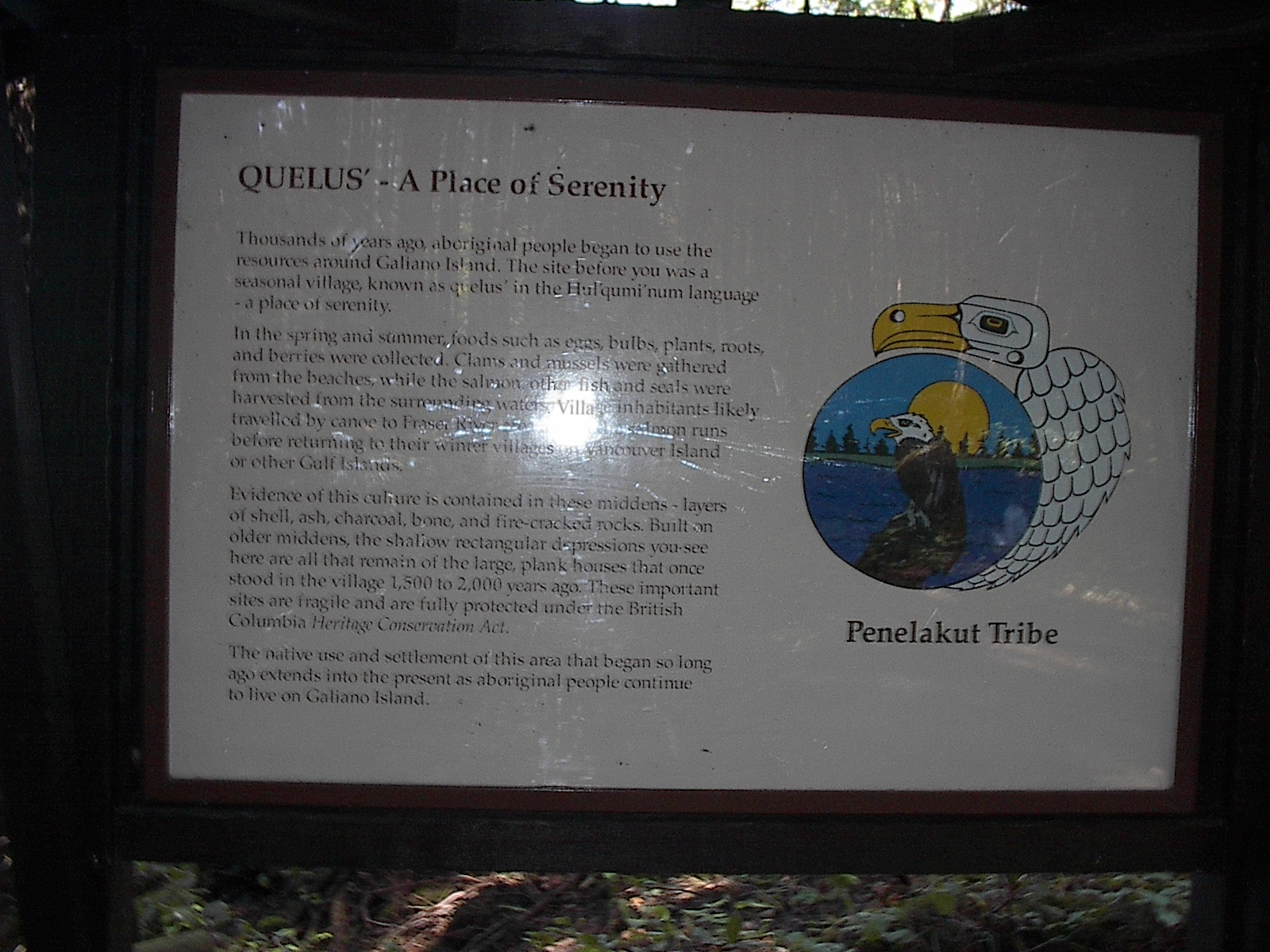
Penelakut information sign
