= Bodega Ridge Provincial Park =

Provincial park on Galiano Island in British Columbia, Canada

- IUCN category II (national park)
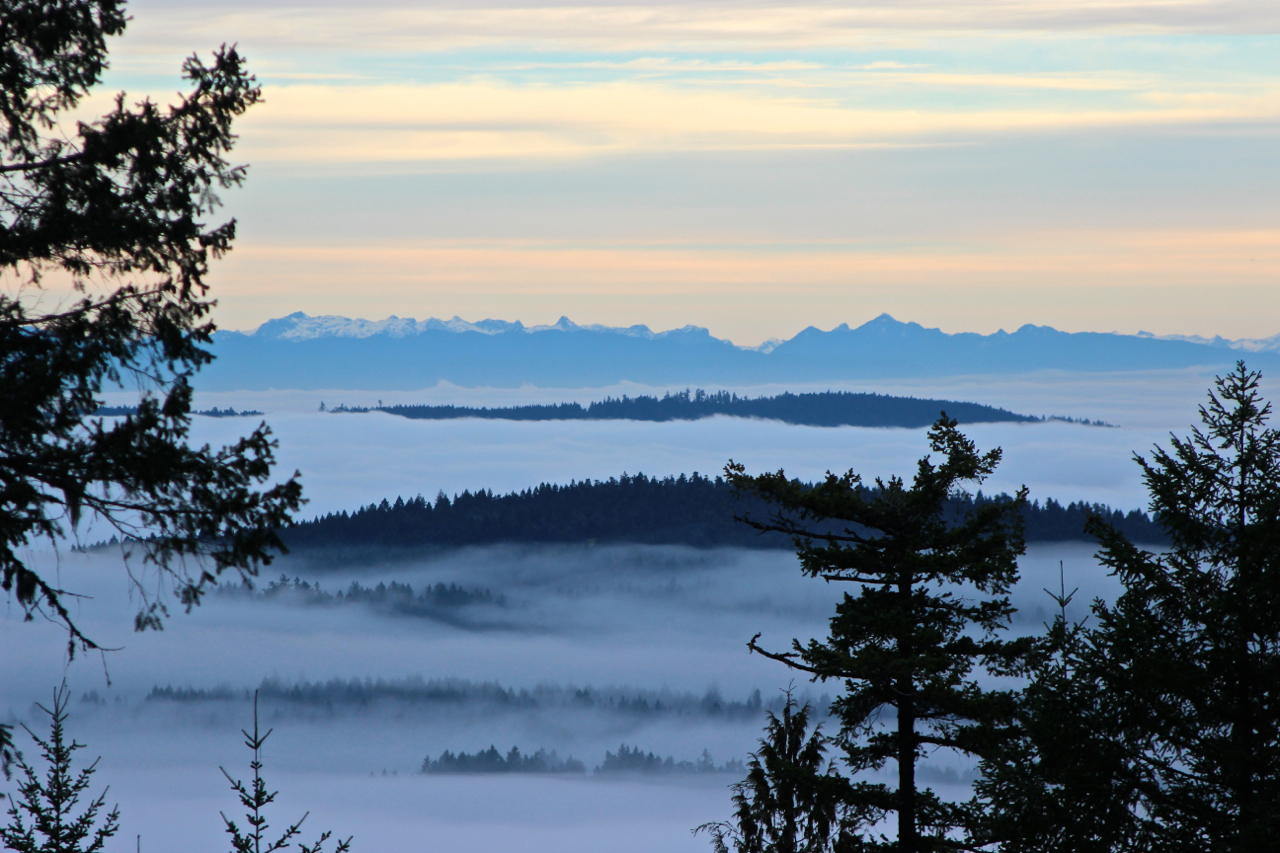
- Saltspring and Vancouver Islands seen from Bodega Ridge

- Location within Vancouver Island Location within British Columbia
- Interactive map of Bodega Ridge Provincial Park
- Location: Cowichan Land District, British Columbia, Canada
- Nearest city: Ladysmith, BC
- Coordinates: 48°57′27″N 123°32′03″W
- Area: 397 ha (980 acres)
- Established: April 11, 2001
- Governing body: BC Parks

Bodega Ridge Provincial Park is a provincial park in British Columbia, Canada. It is on Galiano Island, which lies between Vancouver and Vancouver Island, and comprises 233 hectares (580 acres). The park's high cliffs are home to bald eagles, peregrine falcons, and turkey vultures.

The park was preserved as a result of a long fund-raising campaign from 1991 to 1995, which eventually gained the support of the Nature Conservancy of Canada. In recent years it has received donations from adjacent landowners, and has nearly doubled in size.

== Gallery ==
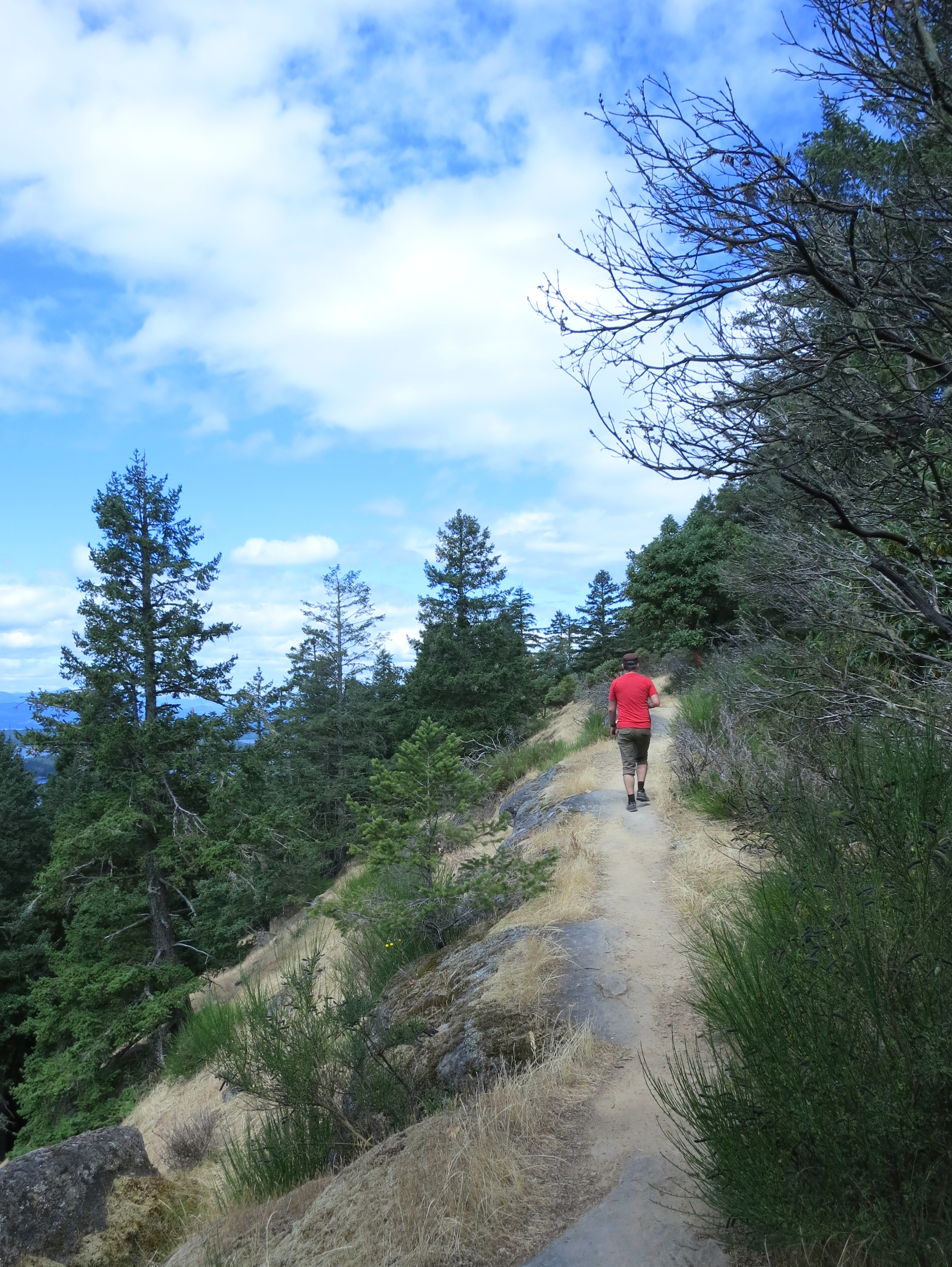
A hiker on Bodega Ridge

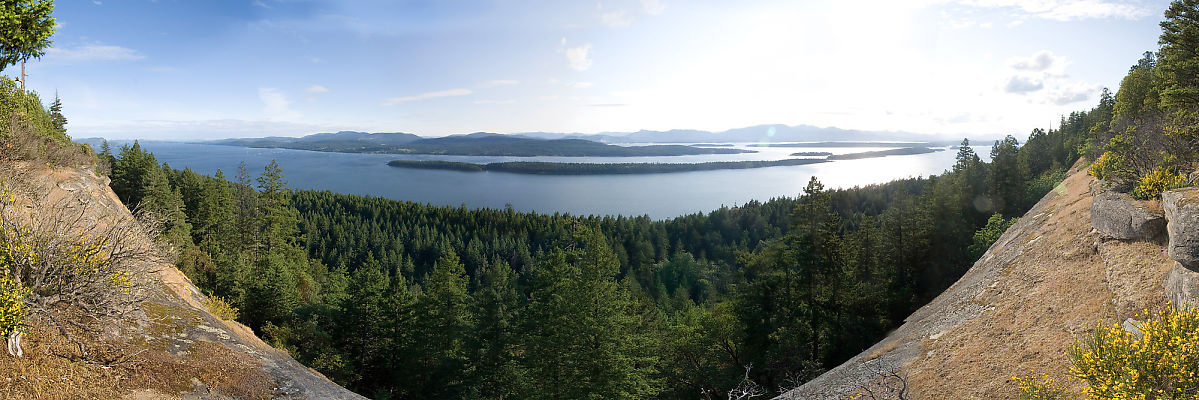
A panoramic view from the ridge

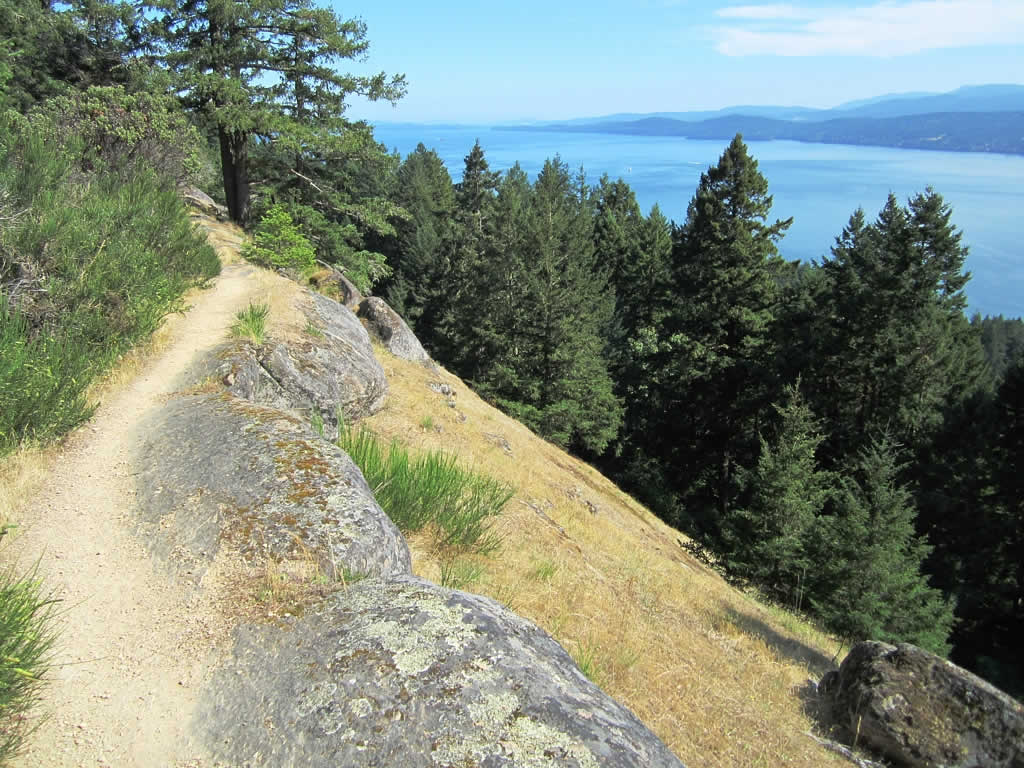
Hiking trail on Bodega Ridge

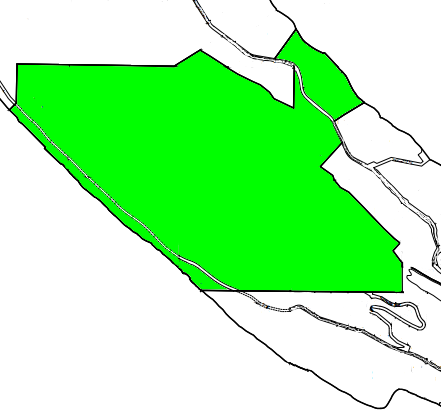
A map of Bodega Ridge Provincial Park, as enlarged by recent donations

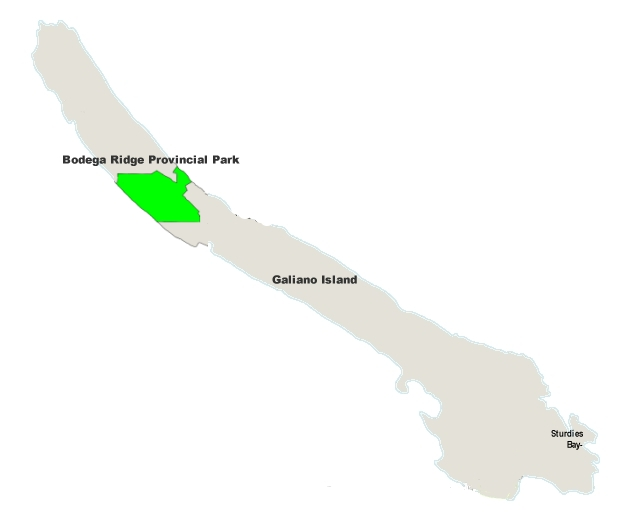
Galiano Island, showing location of Bodega Ridge Park
