= Collinson Point Provincial Park =

Provincial park in British Columbia, Canada

- IUCN category III (natural monument or feature)
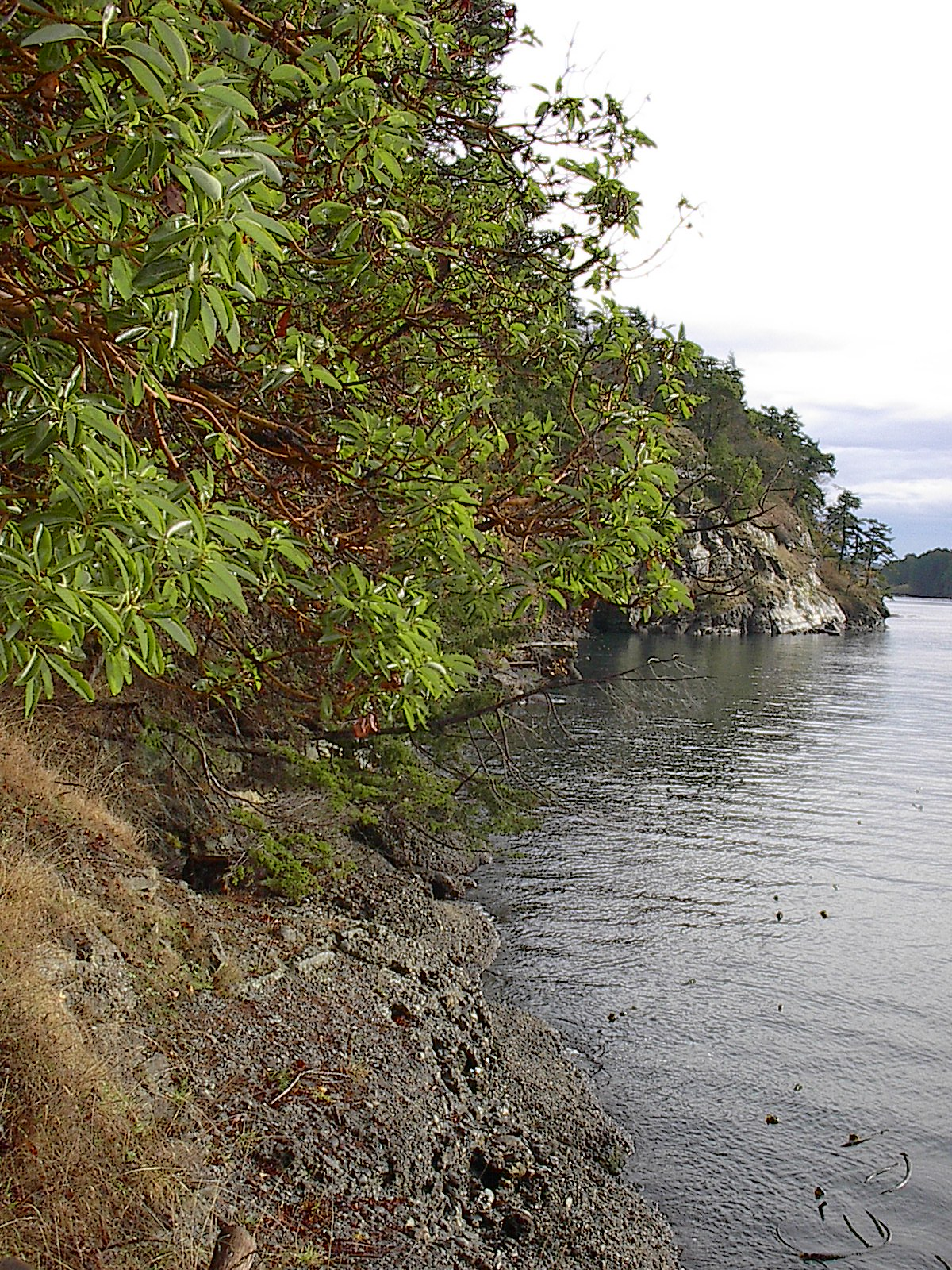

- Location within Vancouver Island Location within British Columbia
- Interactive map of Collinson Point Provincial Park
- Location: Galiano Island, British Columbia, Canada
- Coordinates: 48°51′42″N 123°21′42″W
- Area: 23.68 hectares (58.5 acres)
- Designation: Provincial Park
- Created: 2004
- Governing body: BC Parks
- Website: Collinson Point Provincial Park

Collinson Point Provincial Park is a provincial park on Galiano Island, British Columbia, Canada. It is located between Mount Galiano and the western approaches to Active Pass. The area is 23.68 hectares (58.5 acres), with approximately 500 metres of waterfront.

The park shares a long common border with Mount Galiano Community Park, of which it is an extension. Most of the remaining boundary is constituted by the shoreline.

== History ==
The park was established in 2004, by acquisition from a private owner. Prior to 1988, the property had belonged to the forest company MacMillan Bloedel as part of its Galiano holdings, which itself had previously belonged to the Vancouver Coal Mining and Land Company (who acquired the land by colonial grant). MacMillan Bloedel built the Phillimore Point Trail which passes through the Park.

== Geology ==
The main feature is soft sandstone of the Upper Cretaceous Nanaimo Group, frequently exposed, otherwise with a thin overburden of podzolic soil. The sandstone is distinguished by its flowing, rounded forms; these appear to be volcanic bubbles but are actually the result of erosion by weathering. There are also areas of shale. The topography is steep, with occasional small plateaux; the park is basically the sheer southern slope of Mount Galiano.

== Ecology ==
=== Flora ===
The vegetation is typical of south-facing slopes in the Coastal Douglas-fir zone, intergrading with Garry Oak and Arbutus. Western Red Cedar (Thuja plicata) is abundant in the areas shaded by cliffs, and grassland is present in coastal areas. The grasslands and open woodlands have an abundance of wildflowers typical of this zone, notably fairy slipper (Calypso bulbosa) and Collinsia parviflora.

=== Fauna ===
The turbulent waters of Active Pass are a major source of food for marine life. Seals can be found here, as well as bald eagles and cormorants. Because the park is part of an integral forest area, upland wildlife is also abundant, notably black-tailed deer and sooty grouse.

== Tourism ==
The easiest public access is by a trail that starts at the Mt. Galiano parking lot near the end of Active Pass Drive. The Galiano Trails Society has an agreement with the private property owner the trail crosses to allow public access to the park. The trail is signposted. There are no campsites or other facilities. Another approach is by kayak, and this is quite popular.

== Gallery ==
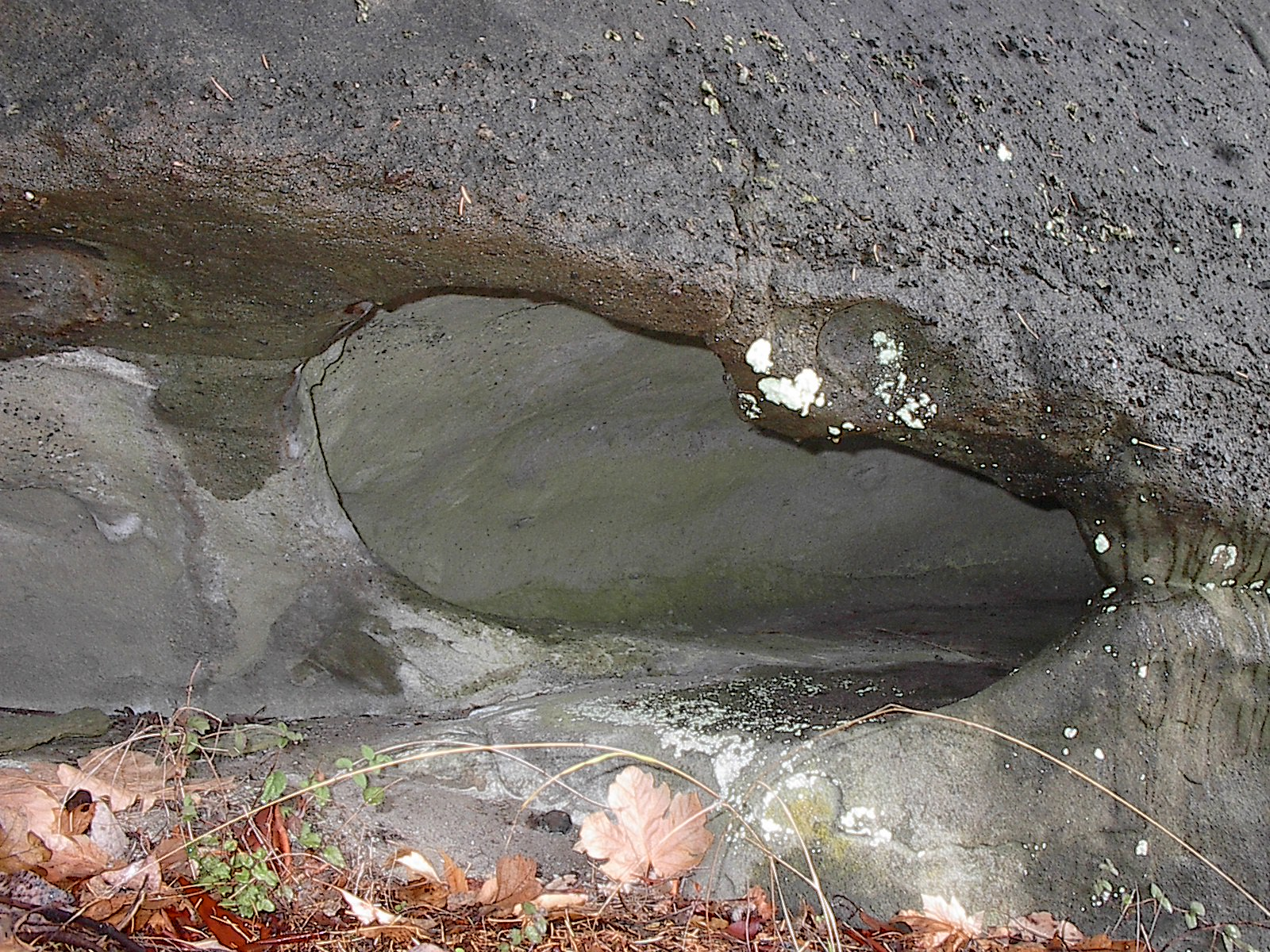
A cave in the park

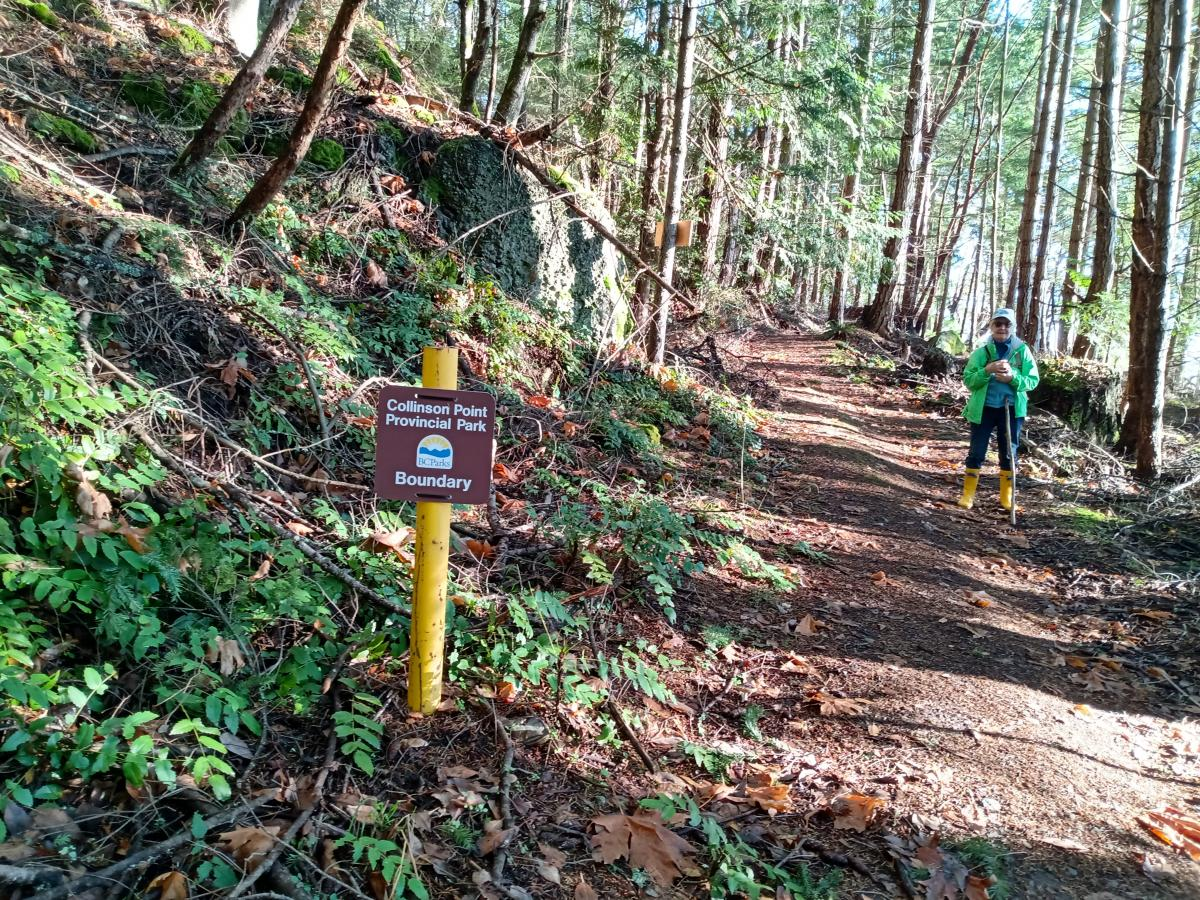
A sign at the park boundary

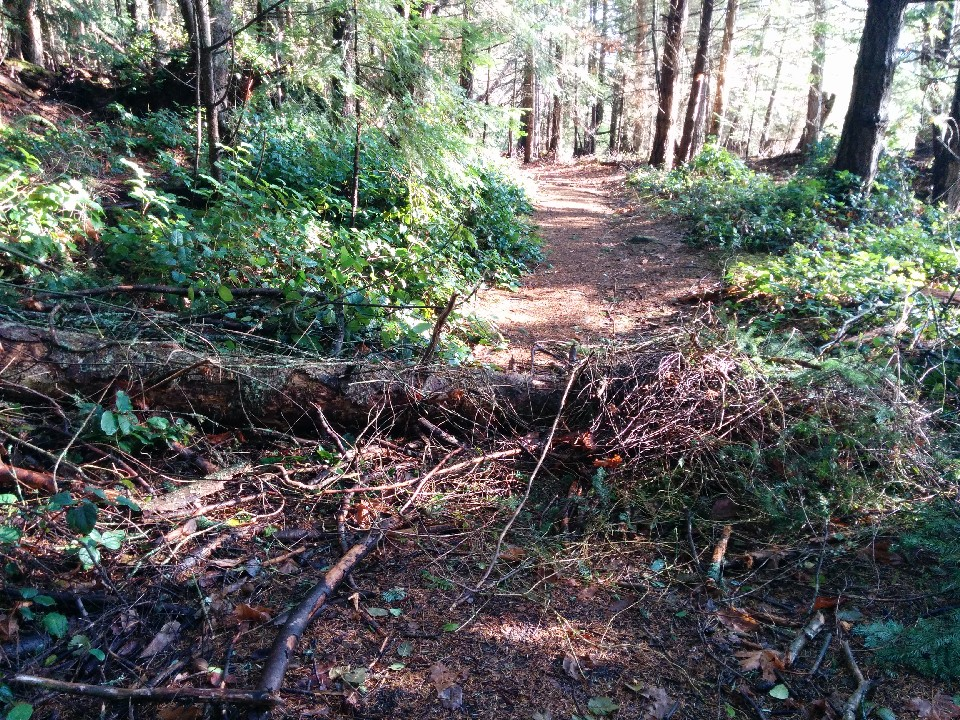
A scene along the Collinson Point Trail

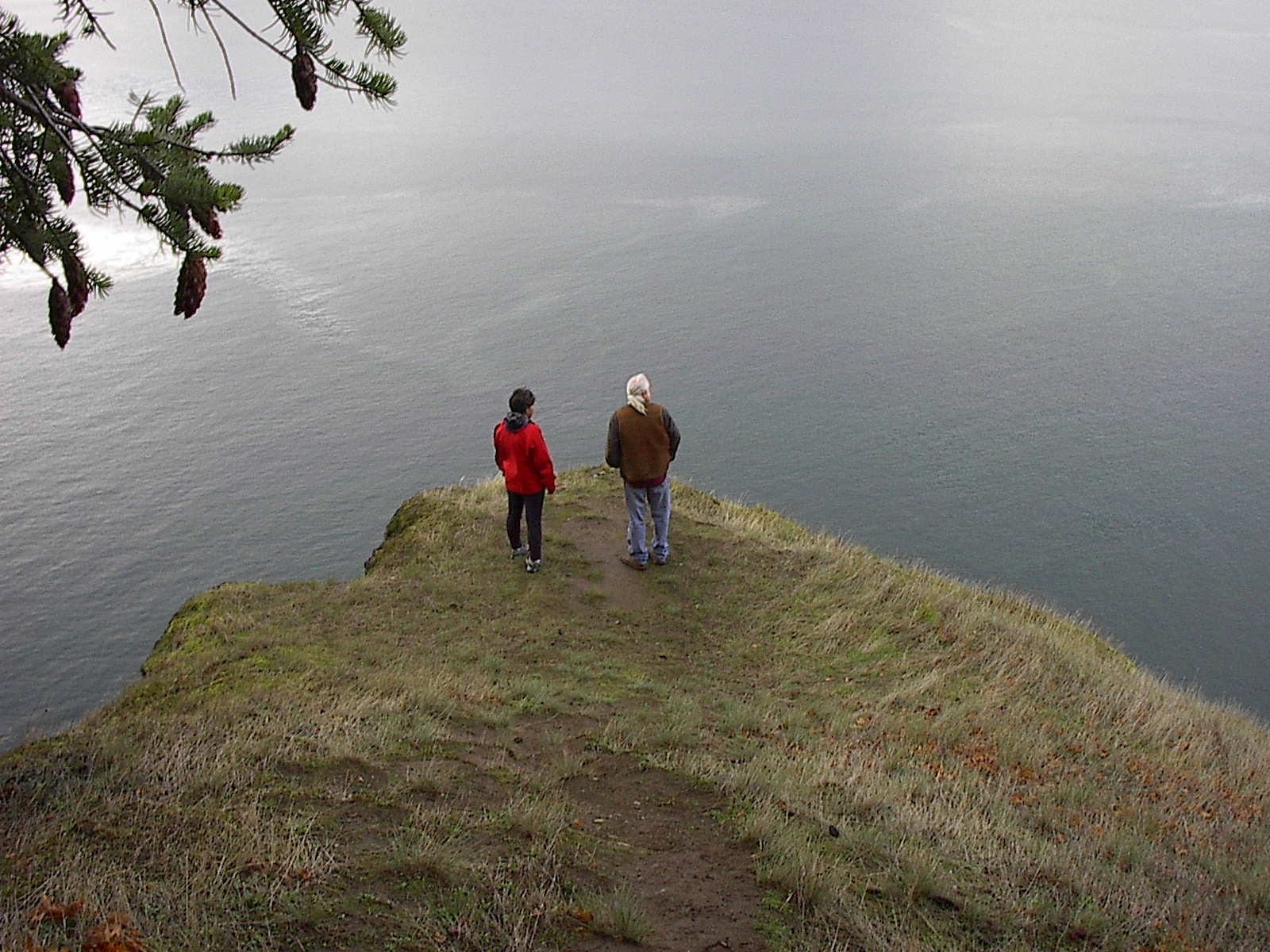
Two onlookers at a viewpoint in the park

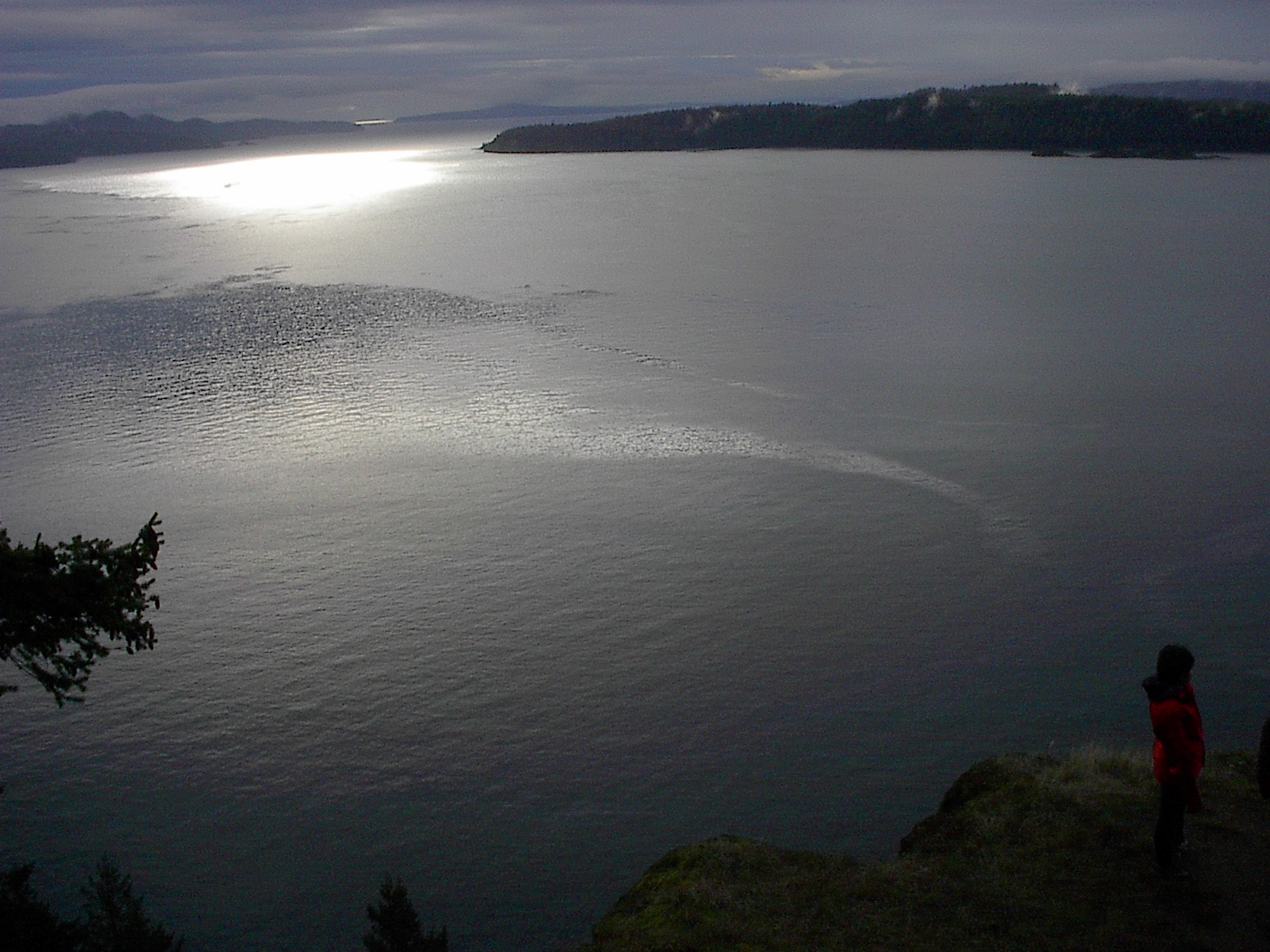
The view toward Victoria, British Columbia from Collinson Point

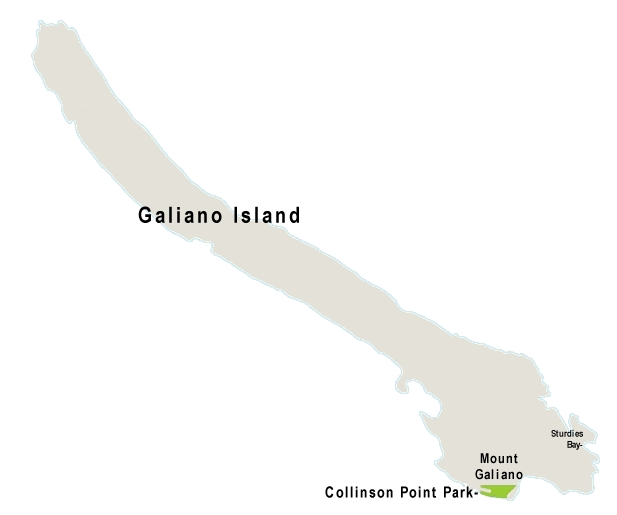
Location of Collinson Point Provincial Park on Galiano Island

== See also ==
- BC Parks: Collinson Point Park
