= Galiano Island =

Galiano Island Swiikw (Halkomelem)
- Island
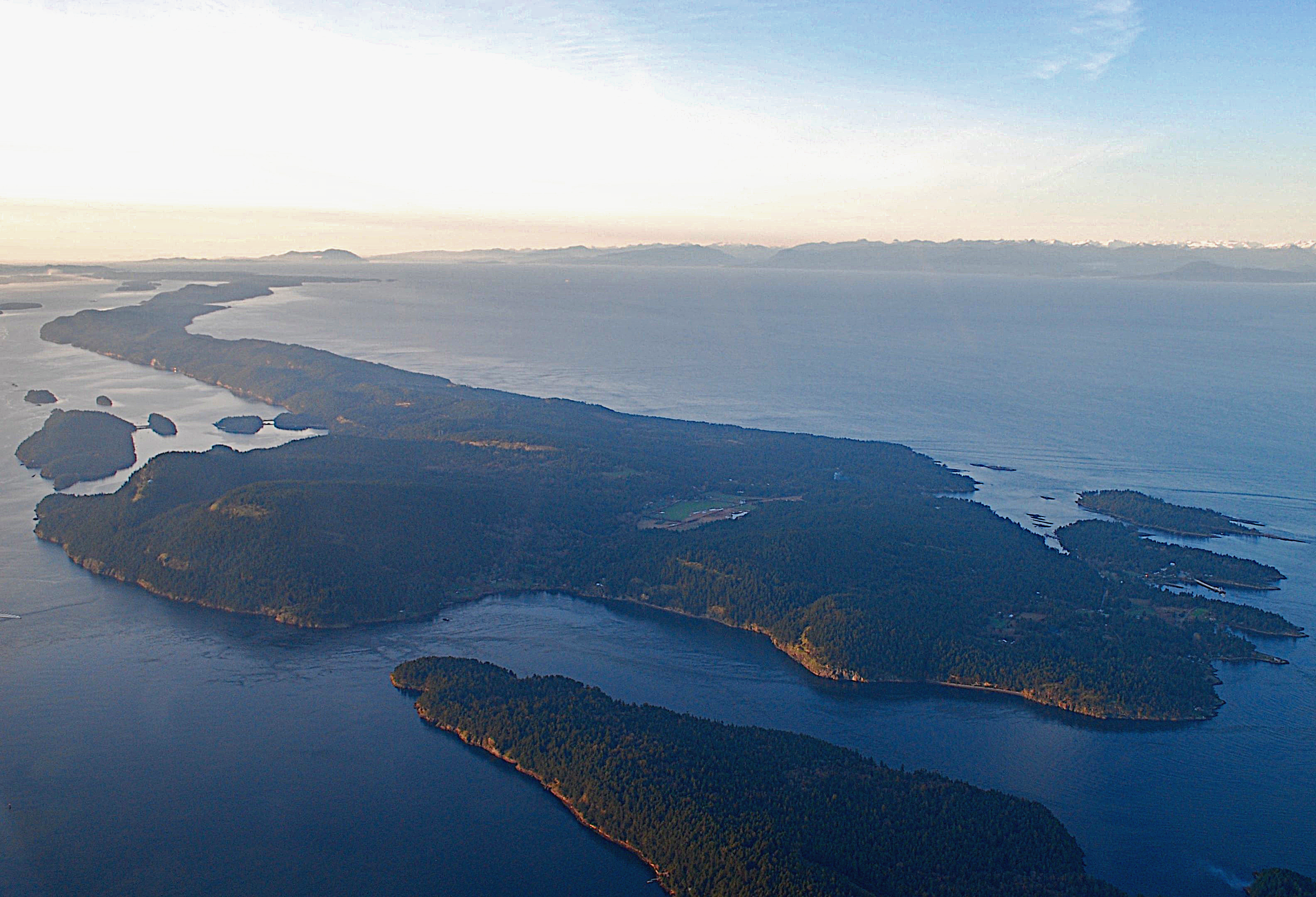
- Galiano Island and the Salish Sea

- Map of Galiano and surrounding islands
- Coordinates: 48°55′23″N 123°26′19″W
- Country: Canada
- Province: British Columbia
- Region: Southern Gulf Islands
- Regional District: Capital Regional District
- Islands Trust: Galiano Island Local Trust Area

Government
  - MP: Elizabeth May (Green)
  - MLA: Emily Lowan (Green)

Area
  - Land: 60.15 km^{2} (23.22 sq mi)

Population
  - Total: 1,396
  - Density: 23.2/km^{2} (60/sq mi)
- Time zone: UTC−08:00 (PST)
  - Summer (DST): UTC−07:00 (PDT)
- Postal Code: V0N 1P0
- Area code: 250

Galiano Island (Halkomelem: Swiikw) is one of the Southern Gulf Islands located between Vancouver Island and the Lower Mainland of British Columbia, Canada. Located on the west side of the Strait of Georgia, the island is bordered by Mayne Island to the southeast, Salt Spring Island to the west, and Valdes Island to the northwest. Galiano is part of the Capital Regional District Electoral Area G, and has a permanent population of 1,396 inhabitants as of 2021.

Galiano takes its name from Spanish explorer Dionisio Alcalá Galiano, who explored the area in 1792.

== History ==
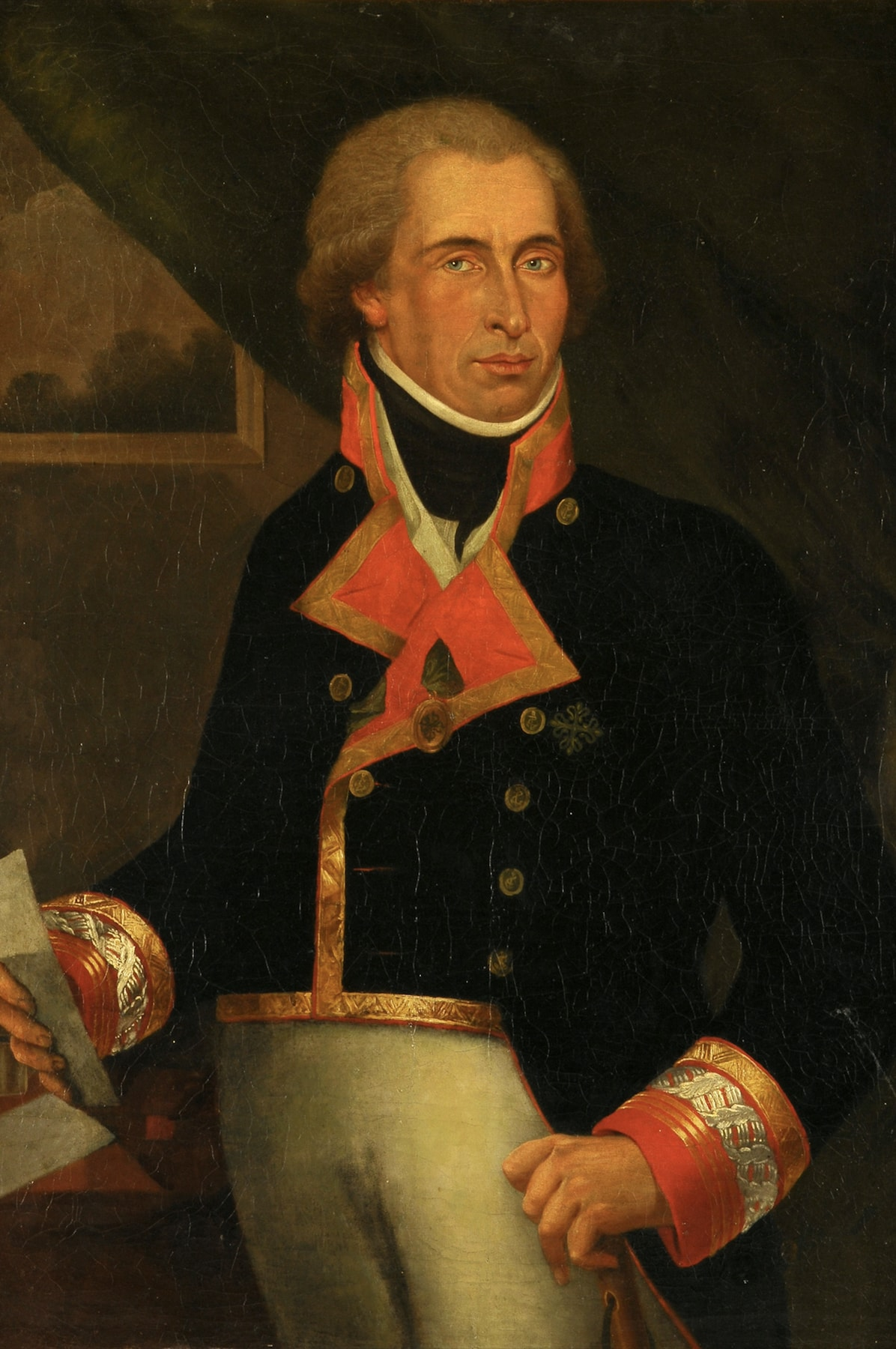
Dionisio Alcalá Galiano (1760–1805)

Before the arrival of Europeans, Galiano Island was long inhabited by Indigenous peoples from the Penelakut First Nation and other Coast Salish peoples. Midden pits at Montague Harbour suggest at least 3,000 years of habitation, with one study dating the earliest signs of permanent occupation in the island's proximities to over 5000 years ago. A complex culture, heavily reliant on the native cedar trees, flourished on the island. In the late 1770s, the smallpox epidemic reached the Coast Salish region, reducing the region's population by as much as 30%. Subsequent outbreaks would reduce the First Nations population even further. By the time Captain Galiano arrived in the area in the late 18th century, the First Nations population had been significantly reduced.

By the 19th century, with European colonization of North America well underway, the area around Galiano remained relatively undisturbed. However, when news of the discovery of gold on the British Columbia mainland reached San Francisco in 1858, nearby Victoria became an important port for miners on their way to the Fraser Canyon gold fields. Due to increased interest in the area from white settlers, the Royal Navy hydrographer Captain George Henry Richards was tasked with mapping the Southern Gulf Islands in 1859, and decided to name the island in honour of the Spanish navigator who had visited the region 67 years prior.

In the early years of European settlement, the island's primary industries were fishing and logging. Poor soil on the island limited the development of widespread agriculture found on other Gulf Islands, such as nearby Salt Spring. Early settlement included a pioneer farming community on the shores of "Plumper Pass" (later renamed Active Pass). Other settlers, such as Scotty Georgeson (a Shetland Islander from Walls), also held land and had family on Galiano in this period.

Galiano Island population
Year	Pop.	±%
1950	425	—
1981	669	+57.4%
1986	755	+12.9%
1991	909	+20.4%
1996	999	+9.9%
2001	1,071	+7.2%
2006	1,258	+17.5%
2011	1,138	−9.5%
2016	1,066	−6.3%
2021	1,396	+31.0%
Source: Statistics Canada

Beginning in the 1870s, a small number of Asian immigrants, particularly Japanese, also settled in the area due to its abundant fish stocks and timber. These Japanese immigrants, primarily from Wakayama Prefecture, brought with them methods of charcoal production, whose evidence can still be found on the island today. Many of these Japanese settlers continued to operate salteries on the north end of the island until the outbreak of war with Japan.

Following the confederation of British Columbia into Canada in 1871 and the completion of the Canadian Pacific Railway in 1885, the nearby Lower Mainland experienced rapid population growth. By 1928, this had grown to the point where the small community on Galiano had expanded sufficiently to construct the Galiano Community Hall, which remains in use today. In the 1960s logging rights for much of the island were given to MacMillan Bloedel for resource extraction. Many environmentally conscious residents objected to the widespread logging, leading to many disputes including MacMillan Bloedel Ltd. v. Galiano Island Trust Committee in 1995. Environmentalism and the 1960s counter-culture continue to influence the culture of the island to this day heavily. In 2011, the riding of Saanich—Gulf Islands, to which Galiano is a part, elected Canada's first Green member of parliament, Elizabeth May.

As of the 21st century, logging on the island has all but halted, replaced by industries such as tourism and a local art scene.

== Geography ==
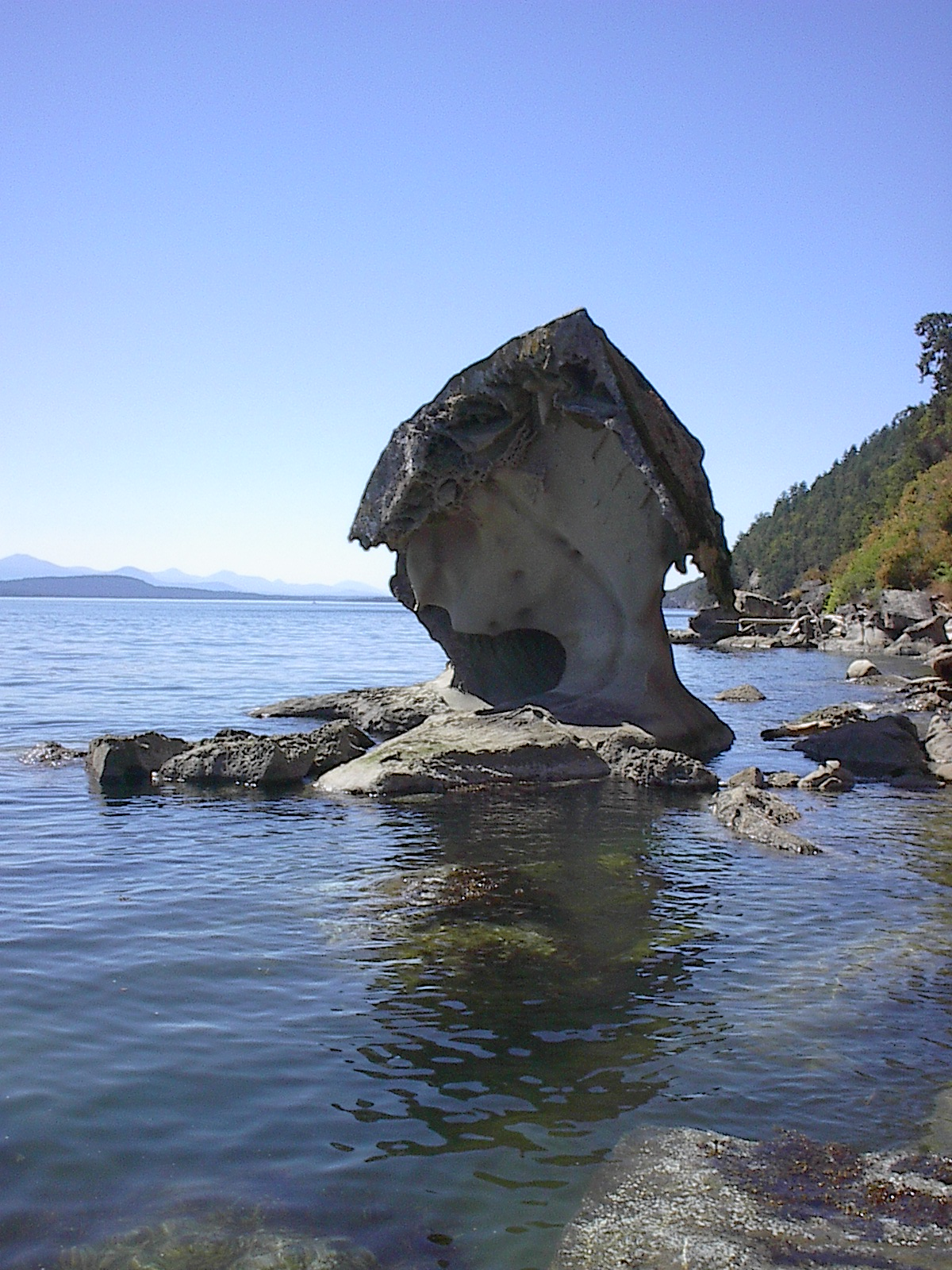
Sandstone formation on the west coast of Galiano

Located on the western edge of the Salish Sea, Galiano is a long, narrow island, 27.5 km (17.1 mi) long and 1.6 km (0.99 mi) wide at its narrowest point.

Mount Galiano is Galiano's highest point, rising 314 m (1,030 ft) above sea level. The summit provides hikers with views over the Gulf Islands, the United States San Juan Islands and the distant mainland mountains as well. Just west of Mount Galiano is Sutil Mountain, an Ecological Reserve 290 m (950 ft) above sea level, named after Captain Galiano's flagship.

The western coast of the island (facing Trincomali Channel) is characterized by its unique sandstone formations and caves.

The northern end of the island is home to Porlier Pass, which divides Galiano and Valdez Island. One of the more dangerous passes in the Gulf Islands, currents can reach up to 10 knots at maximum flood, and many whirlpools and overfalls are known to form.

=== Climate ===
The climate of Galiano Island is classified as warm-summer Mediterranean climate (Csb) under the Köppen climate classification system, characterized by cool, wet winters and warm, dry summers. Similar to the other Gulf Islands, the rain shadow effect of the Olympic and Vancouver Island mountains, and the moderating effects of the ocean are the dominant influences on Galiano Island's climate. Galiano Island experiences an annual moisture deficit from mid-June to early October due to the combined effects of seasonal dry, sunny, and warm weather. This deficit can often lead to drought in areas of recent clearcuts and to an extreme forest fire hazard in the summer months.

Climate data for Galiano Island
Month	Jan	Feb	Mar	Apr	May	Jun	Jul	Aug	Sep	Oct	Nov	Dec	Year
Mean daily maximum °C (°F)	6.3 (43.3)	8.1 (46.6)	10.1 (50.2)	13.0 (55.4)	16.4 (61.5)	19.4 (66.9)	21.9 (71.4)	21.8 (71.2)	18.8 (65.8)	13.9 (57.0)	9.5 (49.1)	6.6 (43.9)	13.8 (56.9)
Daily mean °C (°F)	3.4 (38.1)	4.6 (40.3)	6.1 (43.0)	8.5 (47.3)	11.5 (52.7)	14.5 (58.1)	16.5 (61.7)	16.4 (61.5)	13.8 (56.8)	9.8 (49.6)	6.2 (43.2)	3.7 (38.7)	9.6 (49.3)
Mean daily minimum °C (°F)	0.5 (32.9)	1.1 (34.0)	2.1 (35.8)	4.1 (39.4)	6.7 (44.1)	9.6 (49.3)	11.2 (52.2)	11.1 (52.0)	8.9 (48.0)	5.8 (42.4)	2.9 (37.2)	0.9 (33.6)	5.4 (41.7)
Average precipitation mm (inches)	153 (6.0)	112 (4.4)	90 (3.5)	59 (2.3)	45 (1.8)	36 (1.4)	24 (0.9)	29 (1.1)	47 (1.9)	98 (3.9)	165 (6.5)	162 (6.4)	1,020 (40.1)
Source: Climate-Data

== Ecology ==
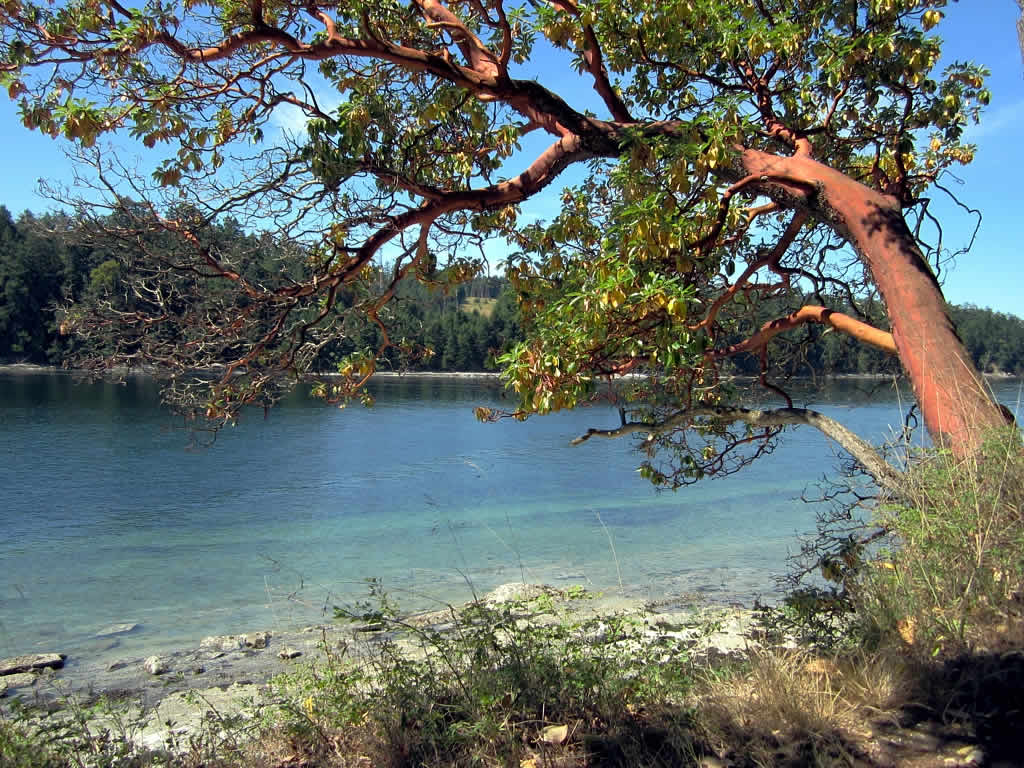
Arbutus tree in Montague Provincial Park

Due to its mild climate and position at the confluence of two distinct tidal systems, Galiano Island is home to a wide variety of fauna and flora that scientists have extensively studied. In a 2022 article published as the first volume in a 5-part overview of the island's biodiversity, researchers reported "over 4000 taxa recorded to date, including avian, freshwater, marine and terrestrial species".

In a primary flight path for migrating birds, Galiano has hundreds of bird species, such as bald eagles, herons and cormorants. Off its shores are resident and transient populations of orcas, harbor seals, otters, and sea lions, as well as many other varieties of sea life, including at least 214 species of molluscs, 86 species of crustaceans, 82 species of ray-finned or cartilagenous fish, 41 species of echinoderms, 40 species of sea sponges, 77 species of cnidarians, six species of ribbon worms and four species of ctenophores. The island is also home to a large population of deer.

Of the 19 reef complexes mapped throughout the Salish Sea, the waters off Galiano Island are home to one of the most extensive ones, with large populations of cloud sponges and Heterochone calyx being recorded, as well as a high diversity of marine animal species.

Many native tree species, such as arbutus trees, western red cedar, and Coast Douglas-fir thrive on the island and can be found in abundance. While most of the island has been logged in the years since European settlement, limited old-growth forests still exist, for example, on the southern side of Bluffs Park.

== Transportation ==
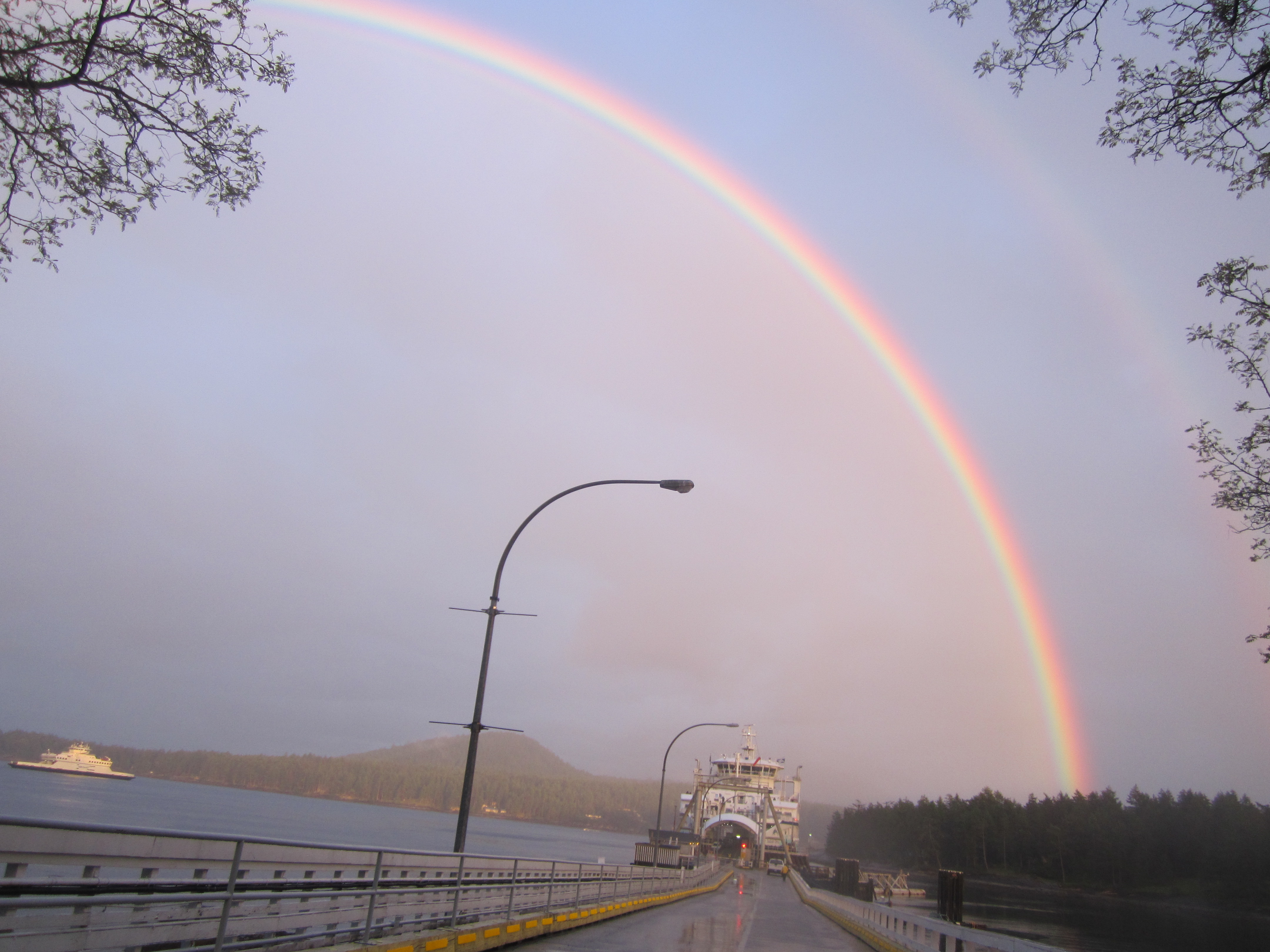
Sturdies Bay, the BC Ferries terminal

Galiano Island is accessible by vehicle via the BC Ferries terminal at Sturdies Bay, located on Active Pass. Vehicle and passenger ferry service runs from Tsawwassen (Vancouver) on the mainland and Swartz Bay (Victoria) on Vancouver Island most days of the year. Additionally, numerous inter-island ferries connect the Gulf Islands, which are scheduled less frequently.

Galiano Island Community Transportation Society provides local bus transit, and currently only runs on Saturdays.

Moorage is available at several public wharves for boat traffic: Sturdies Bay (walking distance to the village), Montague Harbour, Whalers Bay, Retreat Cove, and Spanish Hills. Private moorage is available at Montague Harbour Marina and the Galiano Oceanfront Inn (Sturdies Bay). Limited water taxi service to nearby islands, such as Salt Spring, is also available out of Sturdies Bay and Montague Harbour. In the summer, Gulf Islands Water Taxi takes people from Galiano's Sturdies Bay (beside the village) dock to Salt Saltspring Island for the Saturday Market in Ganges.

Daily, regularly scheduled floatplane service is offered from the Vancouver International Water Airport through Seair Seaplanes to Montague Harbour. There is charter service floatplane service from Seattle through Kenmore Air, either through Seattle-Tacoma International Airport, Kenmore Air Harbor, and Seattle Lake Union.

Once on the island, most areas can be accessed by paved road; however, some logging roads remain in use in the less-traveled sections of the island.

== Parks ==
Galiano is home to many popular public parks, such as Montague Harbour and Dionisio, as well as privately owned parks, such as Tapovan Peace Park.

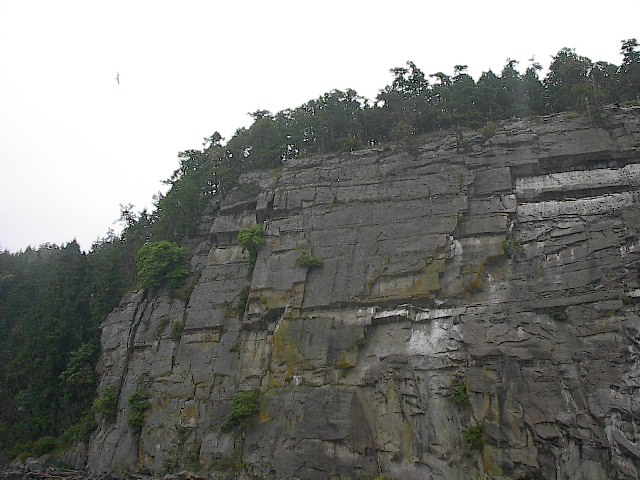
Islands Trust Cormorant Sanctuary

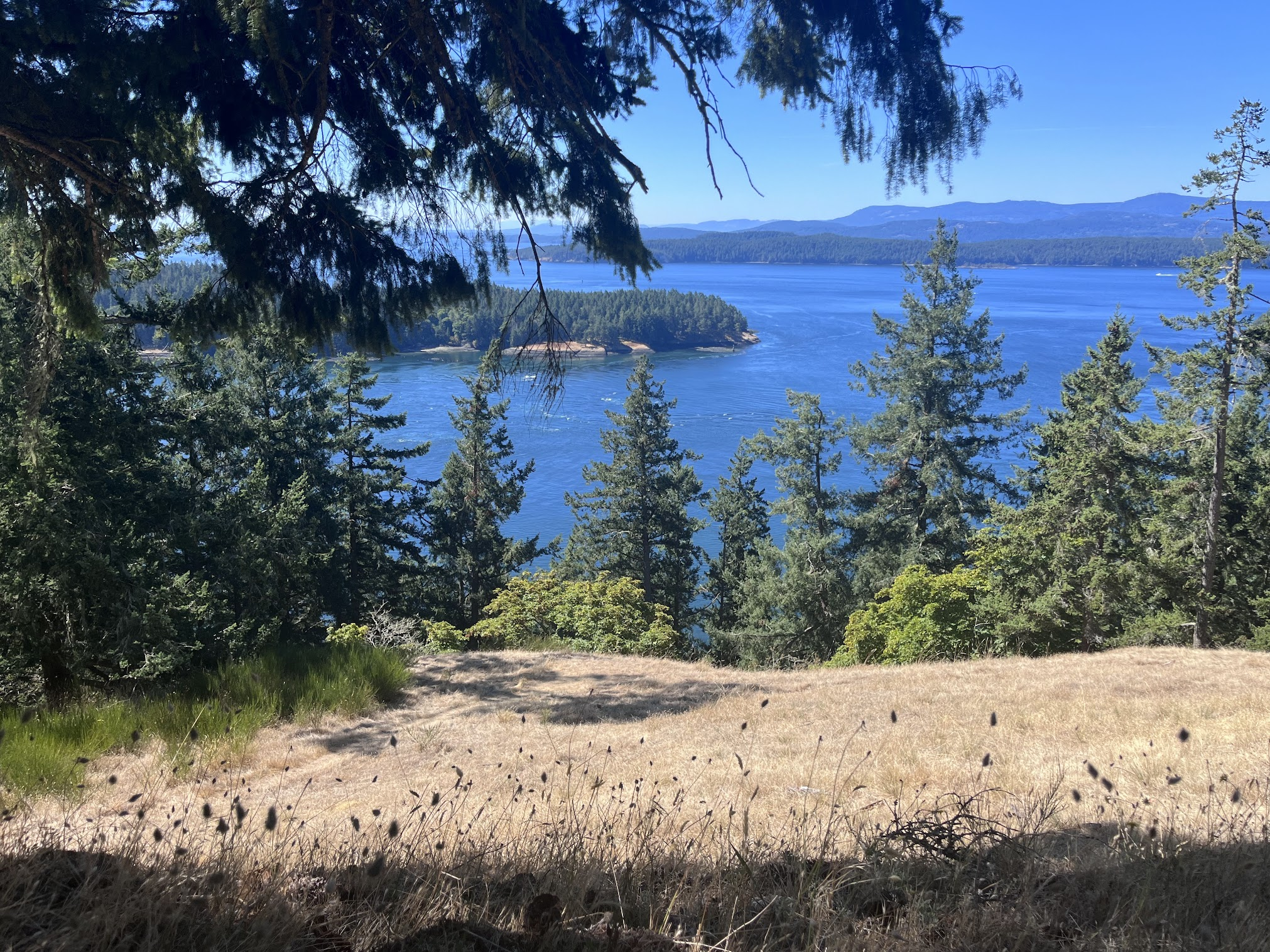
Bluffs Park Lookout

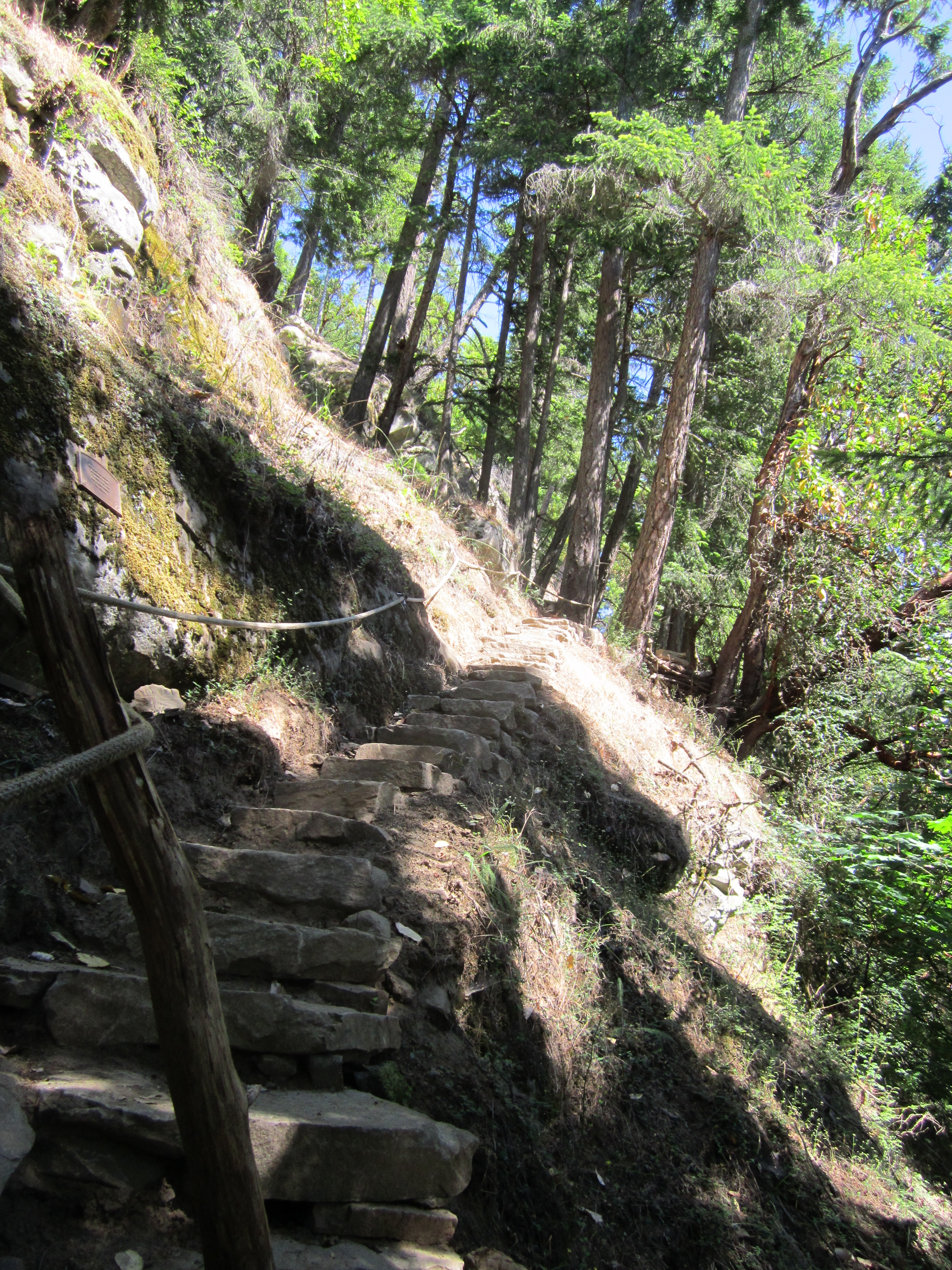
Stairway to Heaven, Tapovan Peace Park

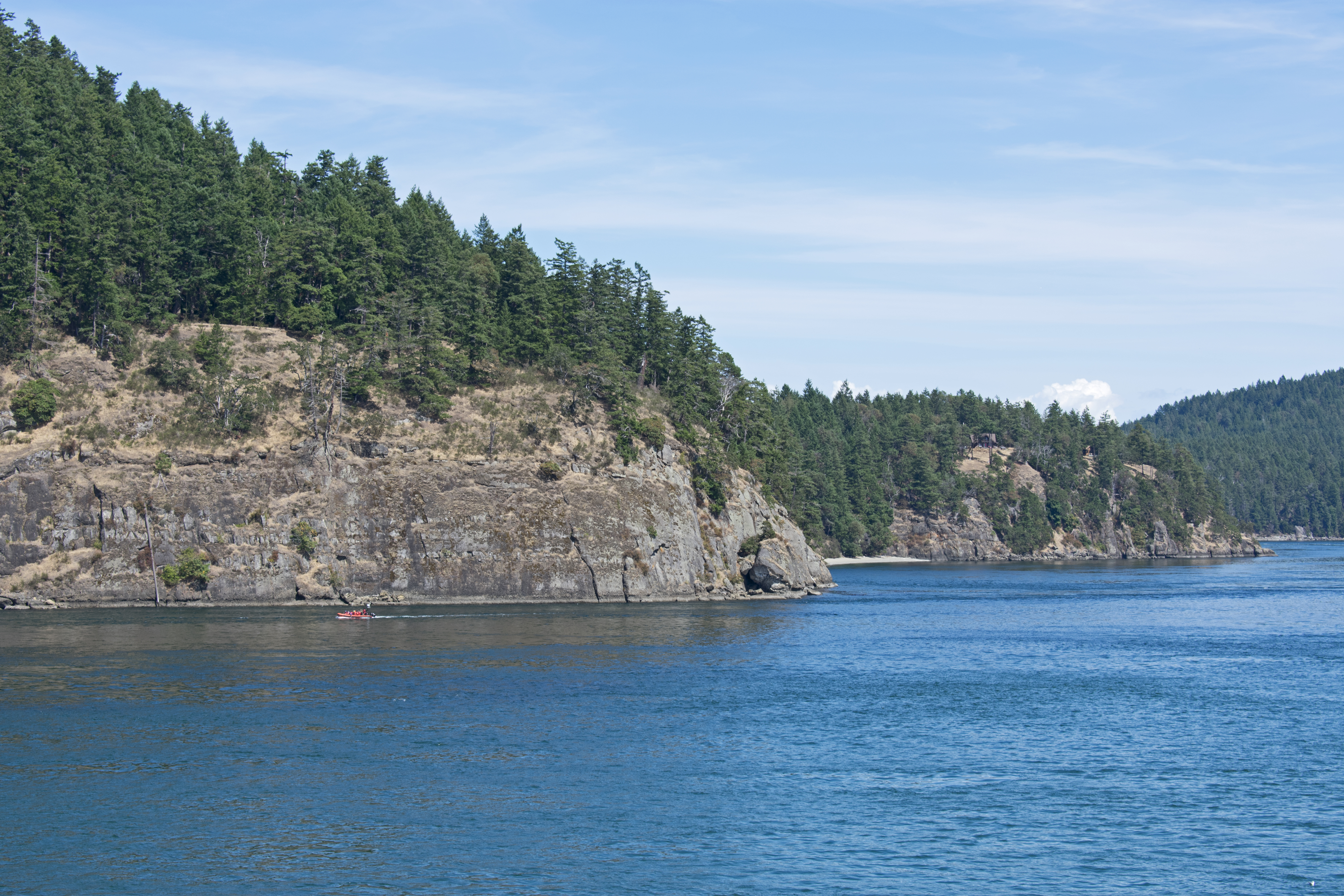
Matthews Point Park

- Montague Harbour Marine Provincial Park is one of the most popular parks in the Gulf Islands. Its Shell Beach is west-facing, with worn shells covering the entire expanse instead of sand. For thousands of years, it was the site of a Coast Salish midden. Montague Harbour is popular with the recreational boating community; the harbour is often crowded with yachts and sailboats during the warmer months of June, July, and August. The park's mooring buoys are in limited supply and cannot be reserved, but the harbour is well sheltered if one chooses to anchor. A marina with moorage, a gas dock, several small stores, and a restaurant (summer only) is located at the southern end of the harbour. A public dock is near the marina.
- Dionisio Point Provincial Park is a marine access only, rugged natural park at the north end of the island with beaches that the local islanders call Coon Bay. It has a shoreline with sandstone formations, a sandy beach for swimming, tidal pools, colourful wildflowers, and forests.
- Bellhouse Provincial Park is notable for spring wildflowers and its views of marine life and snow-capped mountains.
- Bluffs Park is Galiano's oldest wilderness park, established by community subscription in 1948. With 130 ha (320 acres), it extends far inland into virgin forest, as well as having high cliffs and a long sandy beach. It inspired Caroline Shaw to compose "The Evergreen". "One day in January 2020, I took a walk in an evergreen forest on Swiikw (Galiano Island), British Columbia, Canada. I found myself slowing down. My steps were shorter, less frequent. I stopped trying to get to my destination with any real intention or speed. Eventually I stopped moving altogether. I looked, and listened, and felt and smelled and breathed. Like a thousand thousand creatures before me there, some of them also human, I paused and wondered and thought, "There is wisdom in these trees." It's been said before, in ways more eloquent and complex than my little story here. Still."
- Mount Galiano is Galiano's highest point. It rises 314 m (1,030 ft) above sea level. The top offers hikers views of the Gulf Islands, the U.S. San Juan Islands, and distant mainland mountains.
- Mount Sutil, in the southeastern part of the island, is an Ecological Reserve 290 m (950 ft) above sea level, named after Captain Galiano's flagship.
- Collinson Point Provincial Park is the shoreline of Mount Galiano, and is important in protecting the marine life of the approaches to Active Pass.
- Bodega Ridge Provincial Park consists of a ridge that rises over 240 m (790 ft) above sea level, with views over many of the Gulf Islands' hundreds of islands and islets and beyond to the mountains of the Olympic Peninsula. High cliffs are home to raptors like peregrine falcons and bald eagles, as well as trees like cedars and Douglas fir.
- Tapovan, Sri Chinmoy Peace Park is a 200-acre privately owned park, opened in 2013, honouring Sri Chinmoy (1931–2007). It features many hiking trails named by the word "peace", each in a different language, and a stairway ascending the high cliff.
- Matthews Point Park is a 25 ha (62 acres) Capital Regional District Park that preserves over a kilometre of waterfront on Active Pass, of which 300 metres are broad sandy beach. It was named after a pioneer family whose descendants in England later contributed towards the Park purchase. There is also a hiking loop along the clifftops. It adjoins and is connected to Bluffs Park.
- The Trincomali Nature Sanctuary is an area of sheer cliffs that has been set aside by the Islands Trust for the preservation of double-crested cormorants and peregrine falcons, among other species.

== Government ==
Government bodies that oversee the island include Federal, Provincial, and the Capital Regional District, as well as the Islands Trust, whose mandate is to establish land-use bylaws to "preserve and protect" the island, most notably in terms of development. For most of the 20th century, roughly half of the land on Galiano was owned by the logging firm MacMillan Bloedel. As a result, Galiano was not as extensively developed as neighbouring islands. When the firm sold its holdings on Galiano, debate about development issues sharpened, and the Islands Trust set minimum lot sizes to limit development.

Local elections are held every three years to determine the island's two Trustees.

There is one Indian reserve on the island, Galiano Indian Reserve No. 9, located at the northern tip, operating under the Penelakut administration.

== Tourism ==
Due to Galiano's limited development, tourism on the island has remained both limited and sustainable. There are two proper hotels and several cabin resorts, as well as cottage rentals, or camping at one of two parks, the Montague and Dionisio (water access only) Provincial Park Campsites. Known as the "Foodie Island", there are many restaurants to choose from year-round. Activities on Galiano Island include hiking, boating, spa treatments, kayaking, visiting art galleries, golfing, exploring beaches, watching orcas from shore, as well as frequent musical events and island festivals.

== Infrastructure ==
The powerline HVDC Vancouver Island crosses Galiano Island in a southwesterly direction as an overhead powerline section, which ends at a cable terminal on Parker Island.

== Notable people ==
- Jennifer Abbott, Canadian director and editor
- Iona Campagnolo, former Lieutenant Governor of British Columbia
- Christy Clark, former premier of British Columbia
- Marie Clements, Métis playwright, performer, director, producer, and screenwriter
- John Collins, bassist for The New Pornographers
- Brett Gaylor, documentary filmmaker
- Jeffrey Rath, Alberta separatist
- Velcrow Ripper, filmmaker and co-founder of the Gulf Islands Film and Television School
- Jane Rule, American-born Canadian writer
- Catriona Sandilands, scholar of environmental humanities
- Sanjay Seran, vocalist for Delhi 2 Dublin
- Duncan Smith, DJ
- Dylan Akio Smith, Canadian movie director and video game developer
- Audrey Thomas, novelist and short story writer

== Gallery ==
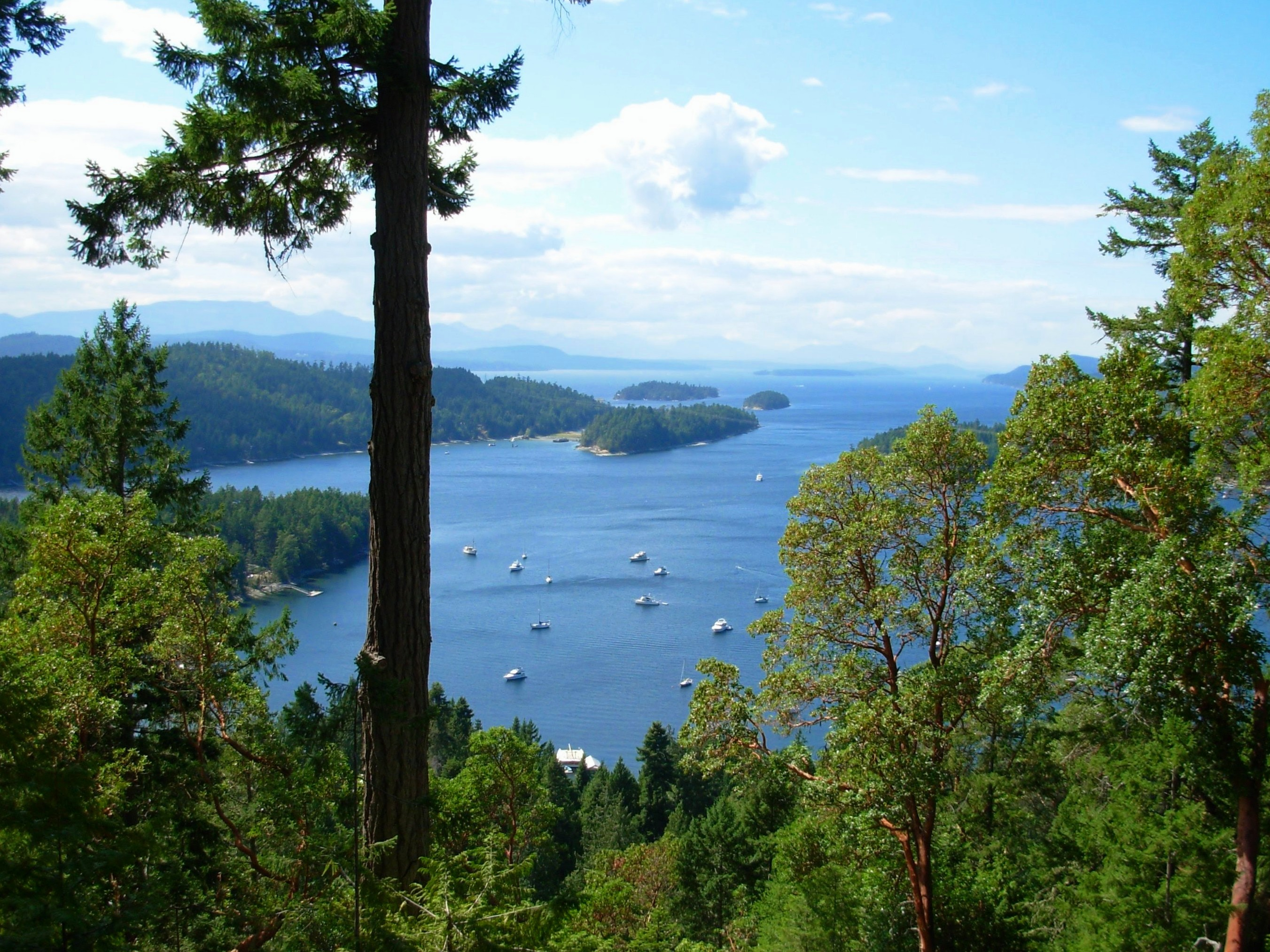
Montague Harbour

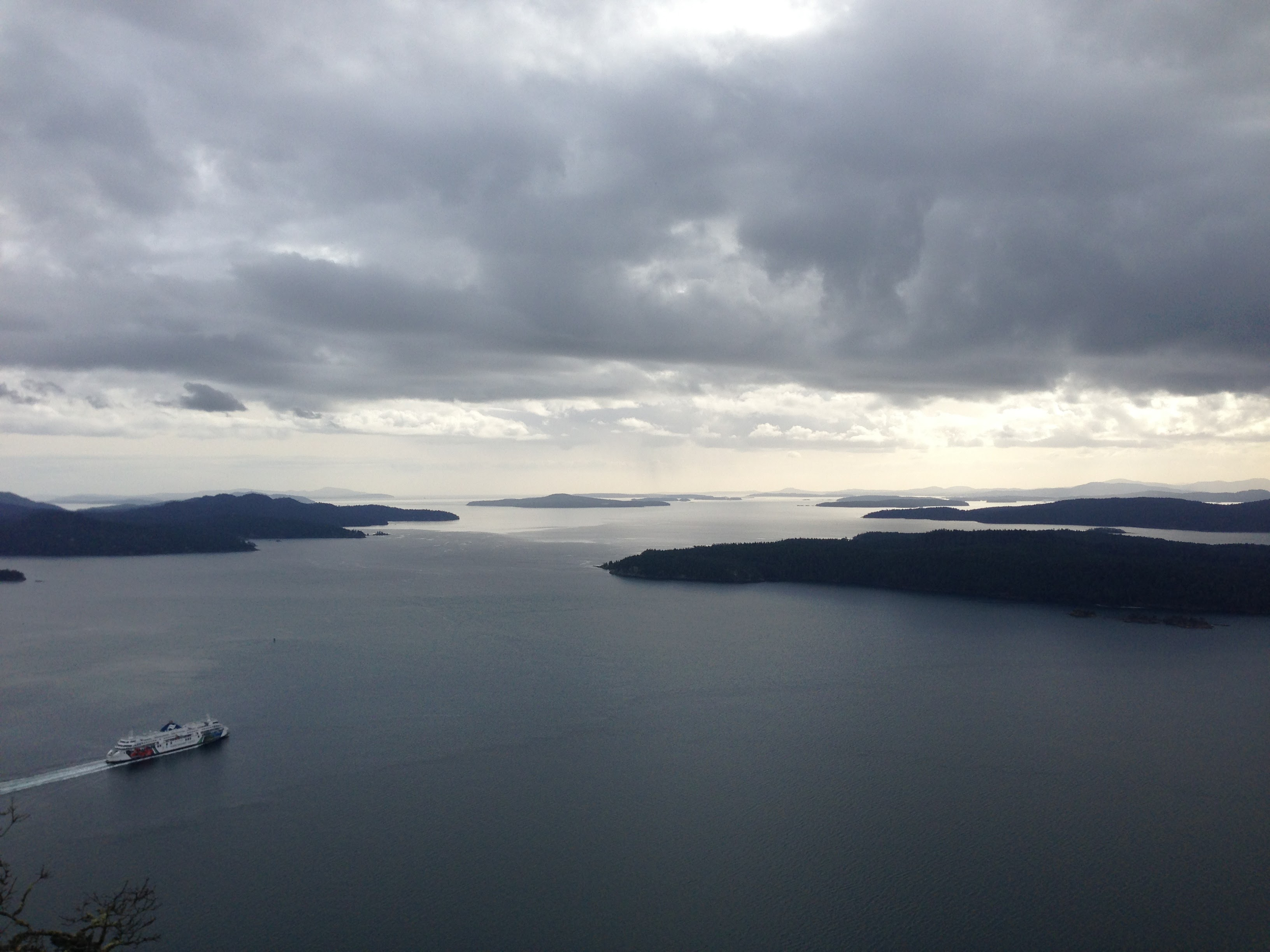
View from Mt. Galiano (late winter)

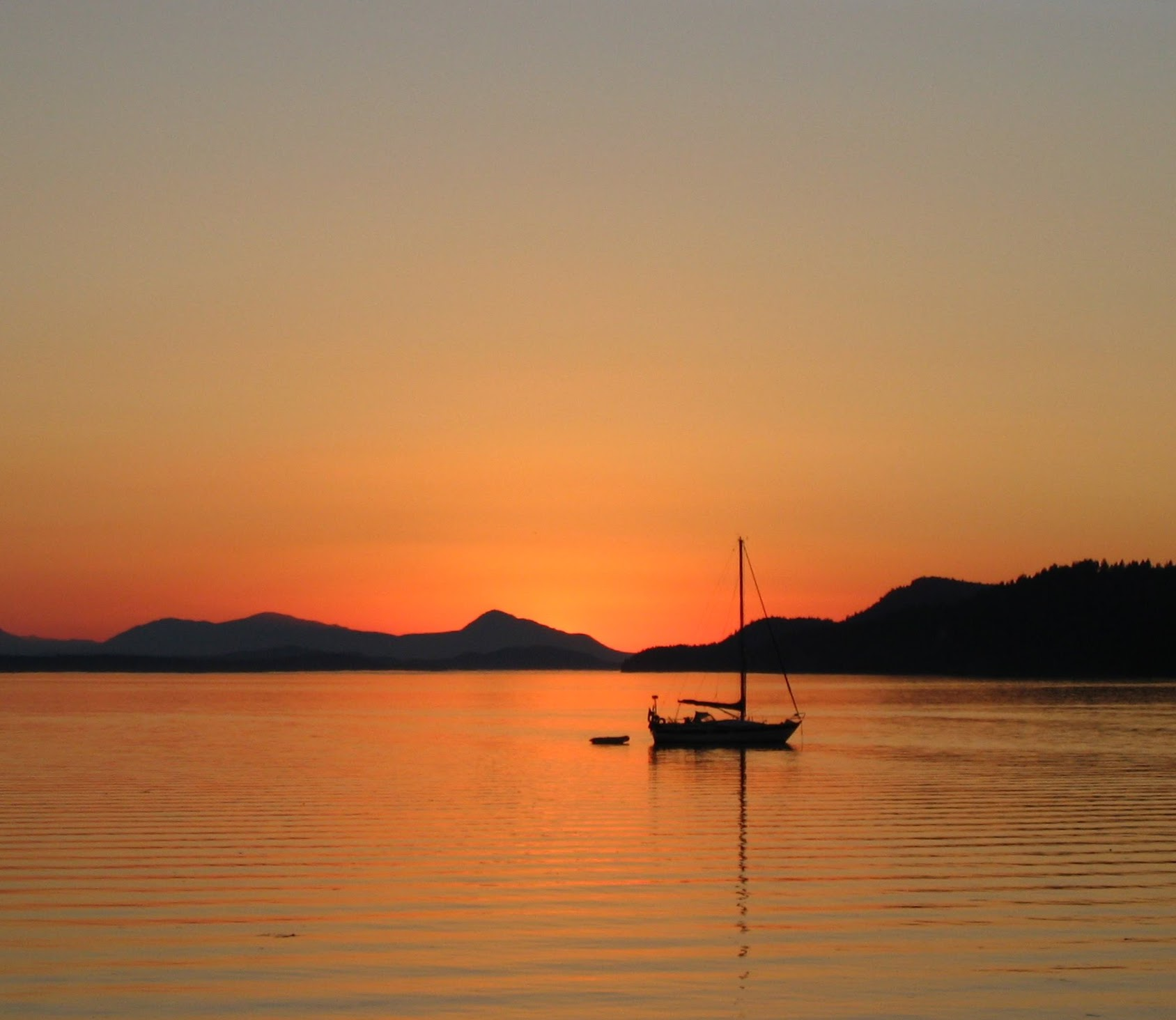
Montague Harbour sunset in summer

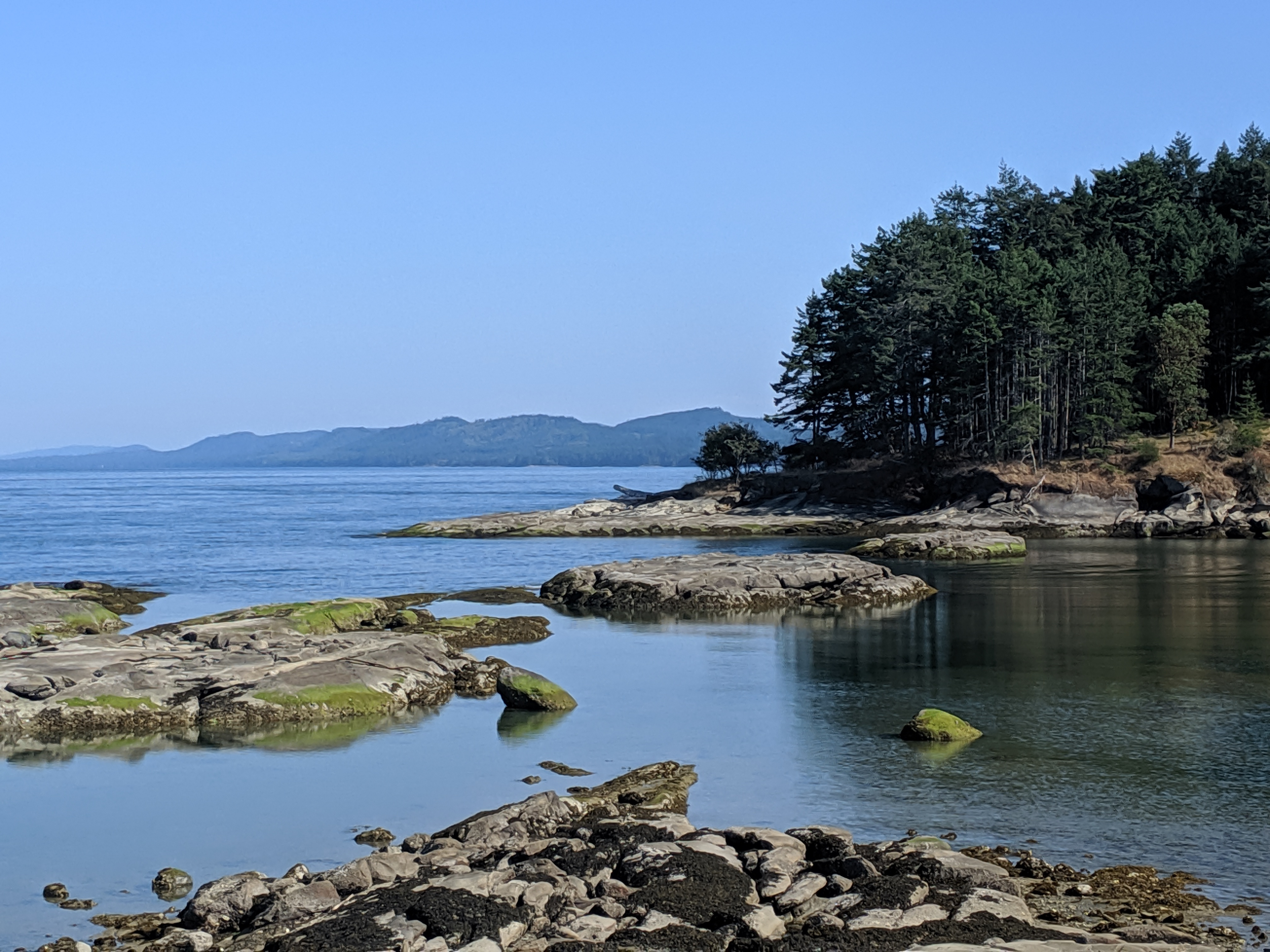
Dionisio Marine Provincial Park

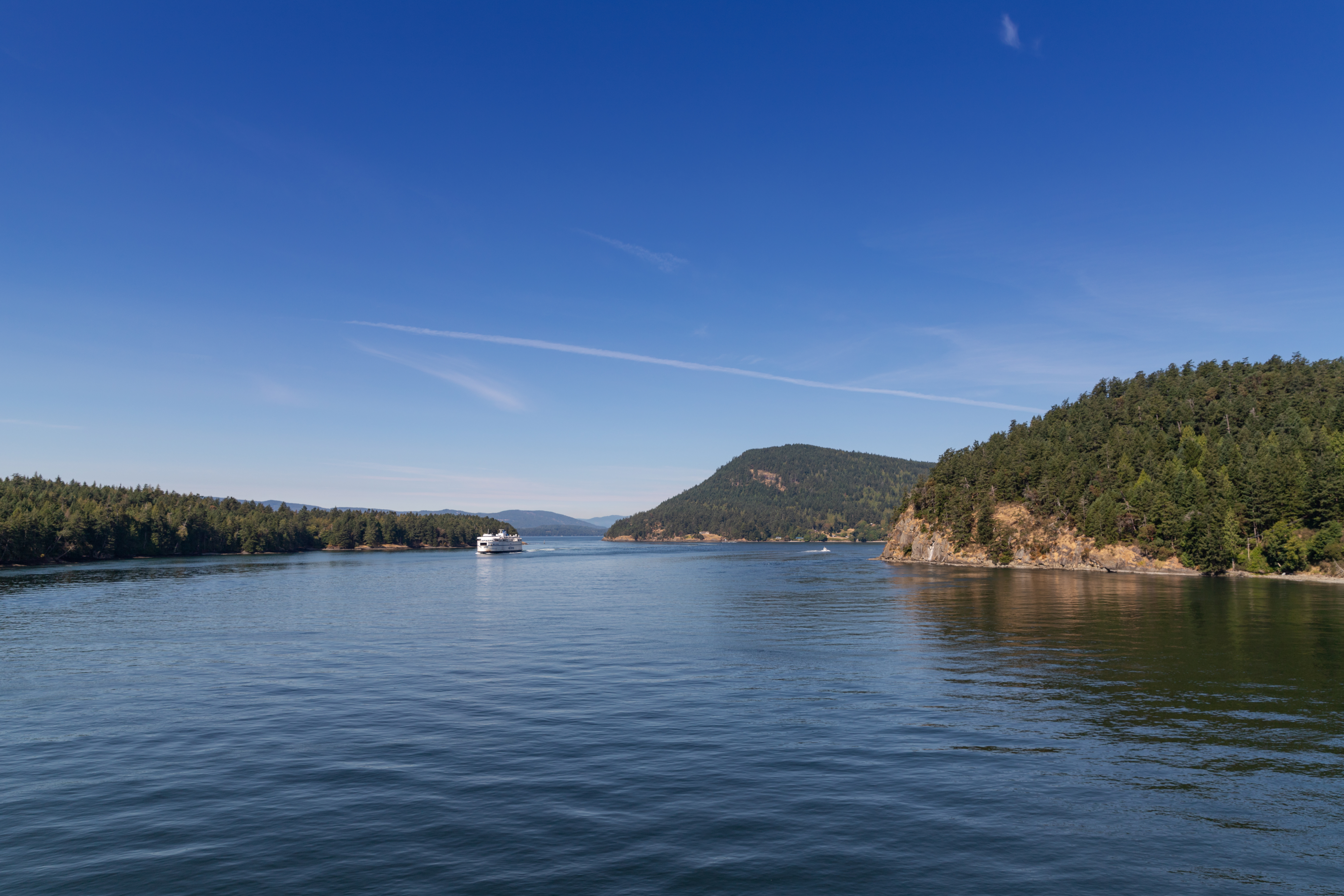
Mt. Galiano seen through Active Pass

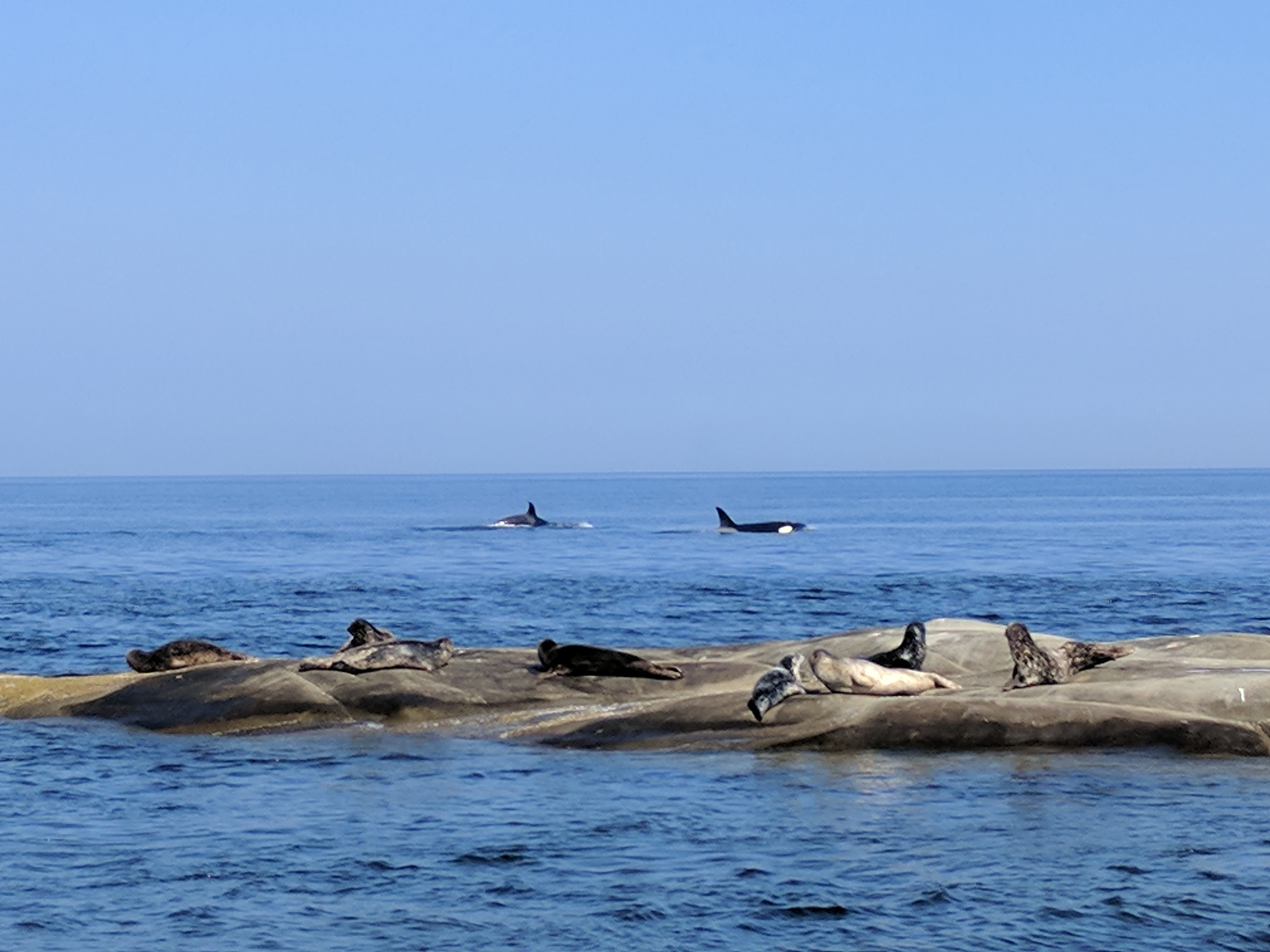
Orcas and Seals at Dionisio Provincial Park

== See also ==
- List of islands of British Columbia
