= Sturdies Bay =

Bay on Galiano Island, opposite Vancouver, Canada

Coordinates: 48°52.55′N 123°18.92′W

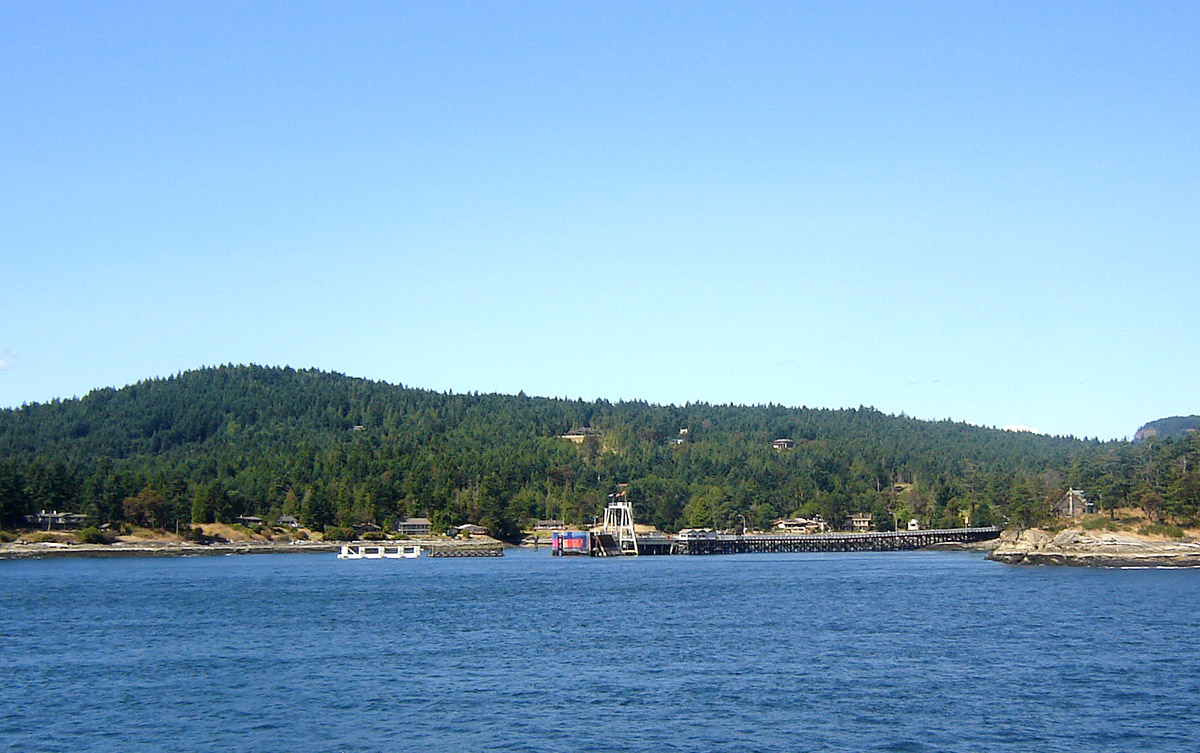
Sturdies Bay

Sturdies Bay is on the south east part of Galiano Island in British Columbia, Canada's Gulf Islands. It is known primarily for its ferry terminal, that connects it to the Tsawwassen Ferry Terminal and the other southern Gulf Islands. At the ferry terminal there is also a public dock, serviced in the summer by an inter-island water taxi, and in the school year the same vessel picks up students here to bring them to schools on Pender and Saltspring Islands.

There is a small settlement at Sturdies Bay consisting of several businesses, including four restaurants, a food truck, two stores, a post office/tea store, a gas station/grocery store, and an inn. There are also a few private residences and moorings located around the bay.

On some nautical maps it is listed as "Port of Sturdee."

In 1954, Sturdies Bay became last port of call for the St. Roch, the first ship to transit the Northwest Passage west to east, when it stopped there on its way to the Vancouver Maritime Museum.
