= List of provincial parks of Thompson-Nicola Regional District =

The list of provincial parks of Thompson-Nicola Regional District contains the provincial parks located within this regional district of the province of British Columbia. These parks are administered by BC Parks under the jurisdiction of the Ministry of Environment and Climate Change Strategy.

== List of parks ==
Park name	Type	Coordinates	Size		Established	Remarks
Park name	Type	Coordinates	ha	acres	Established	Remarks
Adams Lake Provincial Park	PP	50°59′00″N 119°43′59″W	0	0	?	
Arrowstone Provincial Park	PP	50°53′00″N 121°16′01″W				
Banana Island Provincial Park	PP	50°43′30″N 119°46′16″W				
Bedard Aspen Provincial Park	PP	50°39′00″N 121°31′01″W				
Big Bar Lake Provincial Park	PP	51°19′01″N 121°49′01″W	368	910	1969	
Blue Earth Lake Provincial Park	PP	50°36′00″N 121°31′01″W				
Blue River Black Spruce Provincial Park	PP	52°08′15″N 119°15′50″W				
Blue River Pine Provincial Park	PP	52°07′00″N 119°17′13″W				
Bonaparte Provincial Park	PP	51°09′N 120°30′W				
Caligata Lake Provincial Park	PP	51°44′00″N 119°49′59″W				
Castle Rock Hoodoos Provincial Park	PP	51°06′25″N 120°52′30″W				
Chasm Provincial Park	PP, ER	51°10′44″N 121°26′17″W	3,342	8,260	1940	
Chu Chua Cottonwood Provincial Park	PP	51°20′30″N 120°10′19″W				
Coldwater River Provincial Park	PP	49°44′00″N 121°00′00″W				
Copper Johnny Provincial Park	PP	51°26′17″N 121°49′39″W	656	1,620	2013	
Cornwall Hills Provincial Park	PP	50°41′21″N 121°27′13″W				
Downing Provincial Park	PP	51°00′00″N 121°46′59″W	139	340	1970	
Dunn Peak Provincial Park	PP	51°28′01″N 119°58′01″W				
Eakin Creek Canyon Provincial Park	PP	51°28′30″N 120°19′30″W				
Eakin Creek Floodplain Provincial Park	PP	51°28′30″N 120°18′00″W				
Edge Hills Provincial Park	PP	51°02′02″N 121°52′23″W	11,850	29,300	1995	
Elephant Hill Provincial Park	PP	50°46′00″N 121°18′00″W				
Emar Lakes Provincial Park	PP	51°28′59″N 120°24′00″W	1,618	4,000	1996	
Epsom Provincial Park	PP	50°34′20″N 121°18′00″W				
Finn Creek Provincial Park	PP	51°53′00″N 119°18′29″W				
Goldpan Provincial Park	PP	50°21′00″N 121°22′59″W				
Green Lake Provincial Park	PP	51°24′35″N 121°11′45″W				
Greenstone Mountain Provincial Park	PP	50°36′20″N 120°38′20″W				
Harbour Dudgeon Lakes Provincial Park	PP	51°34′00″N 119°10′01″W				
Harry Lake Aspen Provincial Park	PP	50°47′30″N 121°32′31″W				
High Lakes Basin Provincial Park	PP	51°23′00″N 120°25′01″W				
Juniper Beach Provincial Park	PP	50°47′10″N 121°04′59″W				
Kentucky Alleyne Provincial Park	PP	49°55′00″N 120°34′15″W				
Loon Lake Provincial Park	PP	51°06′19″N 121°15′28″W				
Lac Le Jeune Provincial Park	PP	50°29′00″N 120°28′18″W				
Marble Canyon Provincial Park	PP	50°49′59″N 121°41′24″W				
Marble Range Provincial Park	PP	51°11′31″N 121°49′59″W	12,236	30,240	1995	
McConnell Lake Provincial Park	PP	50°31′24″N 120°27′47″W				
Momich Lakes Provincial Park	PP	51°24′51″N 119°27′32″W				
Monck Provincial Park	PP	50°10′00″N 120°31′59″W				
Monte Creek Provincial Park	PP	50°38′59″N 119°56′49″W				
Monte Lake Provincial Park	PP	50°30′00″N 119°49′55″W				
Mount Savona Provincial Park	PP	50°41′38″N 120°48′00″W				
Mud Lake Delta Provincial Park	PP	52°07′16″N 119°09′43″W				
Niskonlith Lake Provincial Park	PP	50°47′45″N 119°46′41″W				
North Thompson Islands Provincial Park	PP	51°22′15″N 120°10′59″W				
North Thompson Oxbows East Provincial Park	PP	52°28′54″N 119°14′39″W				
North Thompson Oxbows Jensen Island Provincial Park	PP	50°52′20″N 120°17′01″W				
North Thompson Oxbows Manteau Provincial Park	PP	52°29′30″N 119°19′30″W				
North Thompson River Provincial Park	PP	51°37′40″N 120°05′14″W				
Oregana Creek Provincial Park	PP	51°59′10″N 119°05′10″W	286	710	2010	
Oregon Jack Provincial Park	PP	50°37′28″N 121°29′46″W				
Painted Bluffs Provincial Park	PP	50°47′45″N 120°45′14″W				
Paul Lake Provincial Park	PP	50°44′30″N 120°07′16″W				
Pennask Creek Provincial Park	PP	49°55′05″N 120°04′19″W				
Pennask Lake Provincial Park	PP	49°59′00″N 120°06′00″W				
Pillar Provincial Park	PP	50°35′22″N 119°37′57″W				
Porcupine Meadows Provincial Park	PP	50°59′00″N 120°31′59″W				
Pritchard Provincial Park	PP	50°41′03″N 119°50′00″W				
Pyramid Creek Falls Provincial Park	PP	52°21′21″N 119°09′59″W				
Roche Lake Provincial Park	PP	50°28′00″N 120°09′00″W				
Skihist Provincial Park	PP	50°15′41″N 121°31′26″W				
Steelhead Provincial Park	PP	50°45′10″N 120°52′05″W				
Stein Valley Nlaka'pamux Heritage Park	PP	50°15′26″N 122°00′11″W				
Taweel Provincial Park	PP	51°38′28″N 120°21′58″W				
Tsintsunko Lakes Provincial Park	PP	51°03′N 120°30′W				
Tsútswecw Provincial Park	PP	50°55′04″N 119°37′30″W				
Tunkwa Provincial Park	PP	50°37′12″N 120°53′02″W				
Upper Adams River Provincial Park	PP	51°37′10″N 119°12′30″W				
Walhachin Oxbows Provincial Park	PP	50°45′00″N 120°55′52″W				
Walloper Lake Provincial Park	PP	50°28′50″N 120°32′10″W				
Wells Gray Provincial Park	PP	52°19′26″N 120°09′00″W				
Wire Cache Provincial Park	PP	51°43′21″N 119°20′56″W				
