= Harry Lake Aspen Provincial Park =

Provincial park in British Columbia, Canada

- IUCN category II (national park)
- Location within British Columbia
- Interactive map of Harry Lake Aspen Provincial Park
- Location: Kamloops Division Yale Land District, British Columbia, Canada
- Nearest city: Ashcroft, BC
- Coordinates: 50°47′29″N 121°32′29″W
- Area: 327 ha (810 acres)
- Established: April 30, 1996
- Governing body: BC Parks

Harry Lake Aspen Provincial Park is a provincial park in British Columbia, Canada, located northwest of Ashcroft near the upper basin of Hat Creek.

== See also ==
- Bedard Aspen Provincial Park
- Blue Earth Lake Provincial Park
- Cornwall Hills Provincial Park
