= Mount Savona Provincial Park =

Provincial park in British Columbia

- IUCN category II (national park)
- Location within British Columbia
- Interactive map of Mount Savona Provincial Park
- Location: British Columbia, Canada
- Nearest city: Kamloops
- Coordinates: 50°41′39″N 120°48′00″W
- Area: 3.82 km^{2} (1.47 sq mi)
- Established: April 30, 1996
- Governing body: BC Parks

Mount Savona Provincial Park is a provincial park in British Columbia, Canada. The park is located west of the city of Kamloops and contains cultural sites of the Skeetchestn First Nation.

== See also ==
- Greenstone Mountain Provincial Park
- Tunkwa Provincial Park
- Walhachin Oxbows Provincial Park
