= Blue River (North Thompson River tributary) =

Coordinates: 52°06′00″N 119°17′00″W

The Blue River is a tributary of the North Thompson River in the South-Central Interior of British Columbia, Canada, located at and being the namesake of the community of the same name, approximately midway between the city of Kamloops and the Yellowhead Pass. The river flows NE to join the North Thompson after flowing generally east from Blue Lake, which is at a low pass with the basin of Murtle Lake and the Murtle River, which join the North Thompson via the Clearwater and the community of the same farther southwest. The Blue River forms part of the boundary between the Shuswap Highland (S) and the southwesternmost Cariboo Mountains (N).

== See also ==
- List of rivers of British Columbia
- Blue River Pine Provincial Park
- Blue River Black Spruce Provincial Park
