= Emar Lakes Provincial Park =

Provincial park in British Columbia, Canada

- IUCN category II (national park)
- Location within British Columbia
- Interactive map of Emar Lakes Provincial Park
- Location: Kamloops Division Yale Land District, British Columbia, Canada
- Nearest city: Little Fort, BC
- Coordinates: 51°28′44″N 120°23′45″W
- Area: 1,618 ha (4,000 acres)
- Established: April 30, 1996
- Governing body: BC Parks

Emar Lakes Provincial Park is a provincial park in British Columbia, Canada. The park is located in the upper Emar Creek watershed, northwest of the community of Little Fort. The Hudson's Bay Company Brigade Trail was identified in the park near Jim Lake and Richard Lake.

The park protects wildlife habitat for species including moose, ruffed grouse, common loon, great horned owls, and black terns. The landscape is forested, with a chain of small and large lakes.

== See also ==
- Dunn Peak
- Eakin Creek Canyon Provincial Park
- Eakin Creek Floodplain Provincial Park
- High Lakes Basin Provincial Park
