= Big Bar =

Big Bar may refer to:

- Big Bar Ferry, on the Fraser River, British Columbia, Canada
  - Big Bar Heliport
- Big Bar Lake Provincial Park, British Columbia, Canada
- Big Bar, Butte County, California
- Big Bar, Trinity County, California
- P-30-M variant of the P-30 radar, NATO reporting name "Big Bar"
- Pulga, California, formerly Big Bar
