= Verity mine =

Tantalum mine in British Columbia, Canada

Coordinates: 52.434196°N 118.937062°W

- Interactive map of Verity mine
- Location: British Columbia, Canada
- Products: Tantalum

The Verity mine is a large mine located about '30 miles kilometres north-northeast of Blue River in southeastern British Columbia', Canada. Verity represents one of the largest tantalum reserves in Canada having estimated reserves of 3.06 million tonnes of ore grading 0.02% tantalum, 0.065% niobium and 3.2% fluorite.
