= Pyramid Creek =

Pyramid Creek can refer to:

- Pyramid Creek (Kakiddi Creek tributary), a stream in British Columbia, Canada
- Pyramid Creek (North Thompson River tributary), a stream in British Columbia, Canada
