= Tsútswecw Provincial Park =

Provincial park in British Columbia

- Roderick Haig-Brown Provincial Park
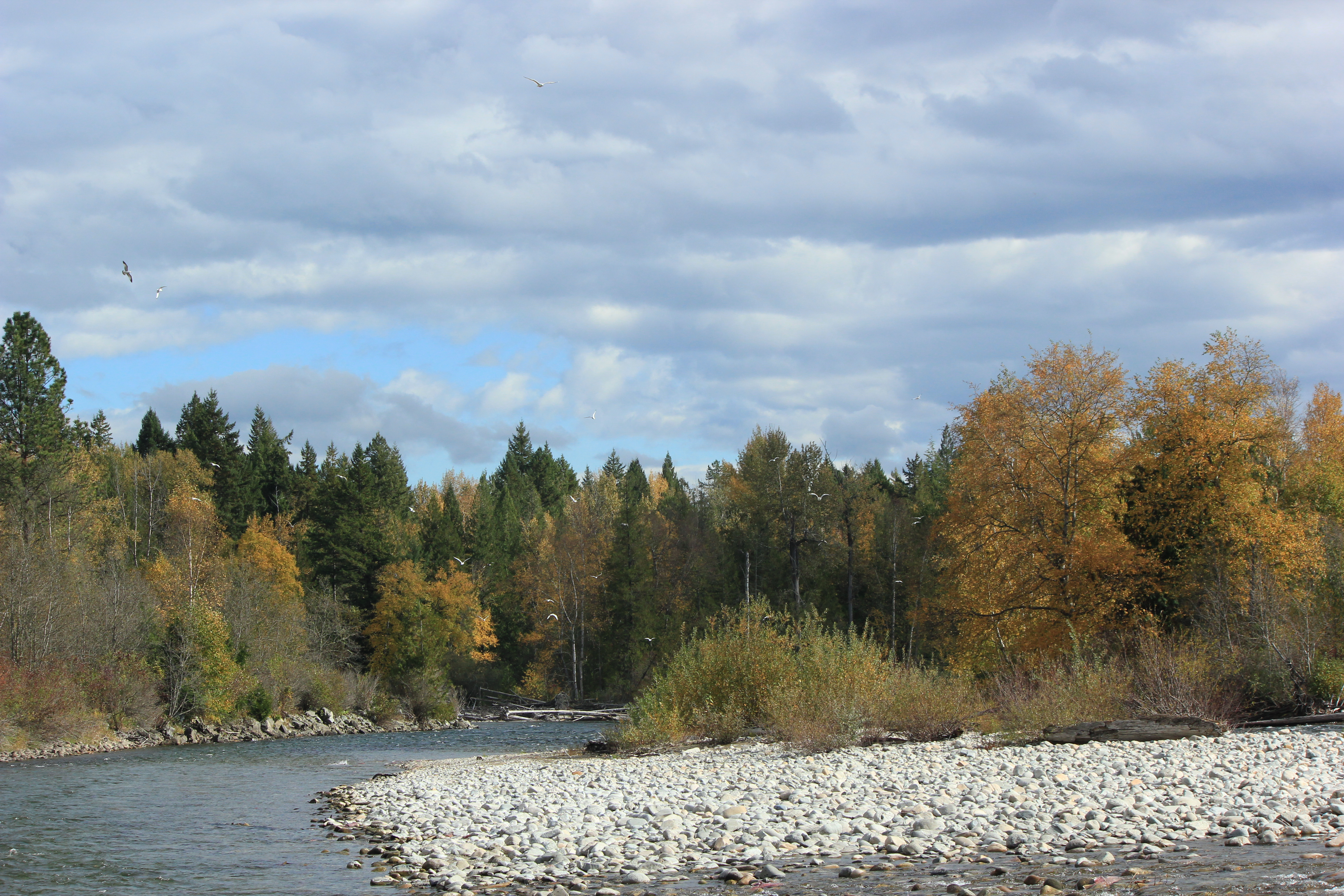
- The Adams River in the autumn

- Location within British Columbia
- Interactive map of Tsútswecw Provincial Park
- Nearest city: Squilax, British Columbia
- Coordinates: 50°54′50″N 119°36′30″W
- Area: 1,073 ha (4.14 sq mi)
- Established: 1977

Tsútswecw Provincial Park is a provincial park in British Columbia, Canada, located northeast of Kamloops and northwest of Salmon Arm. It stretches along the banks of the Adams River, between the south end of Adams Lake and the western portion of Shuswap Lake.

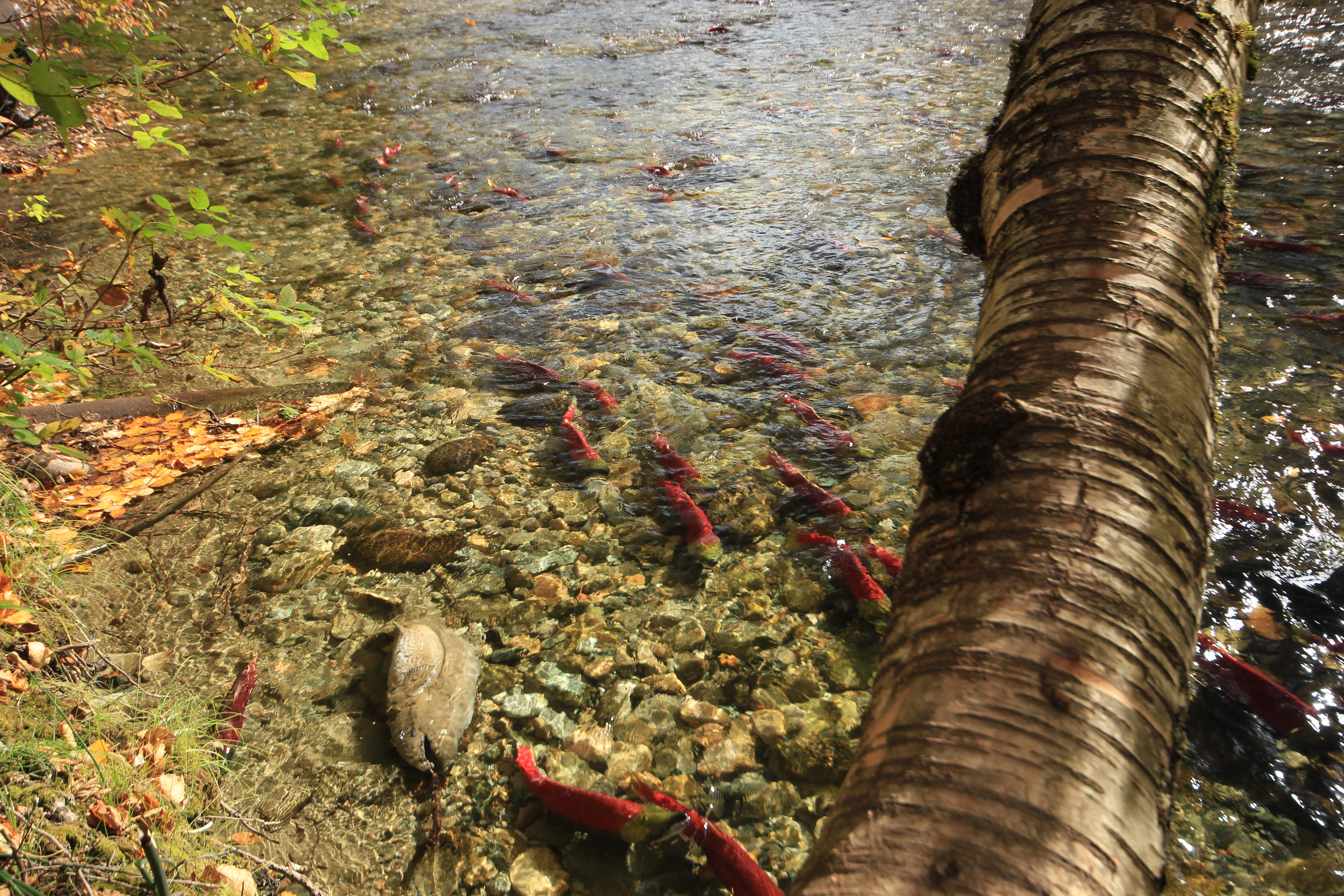
Salmon along the edge of the river during the November salmon run.

It is known for being one of the largest sockeye salmon runs in North America. A dominant year occurs every four years when millions of sockeye salmon spawn in the Adams River. The last dominant run was in October 2014, the next in 2018, with "sub-dominant" runs in 2007 and 2011. The Adams River Salmon Society coordinates the celebration known as the "Salute to the Sockeye" during the dominant years.

The park preserves evidence of thousands of years of Secwepemc habitation, including the remains of kekuli pit houses and pictographs on the exposed rock of the river's gorge. It also preserves features from early European resource extraction; the Flume trails in the north of the park showcase the massive flumes built to move logs from nearby areas into the Adams River for transport. In August of 2023, large portions of the park were burned by the Bush Creek East forest fire.

The park's name, pronounced "choo-chwek", is a Secwepemc term meaning "many rivers" and reflects the name of the area used by First Nations peoples. The park's former name references Roderick Haig-Brown, a Canadian writer and conservationist.
