= Harbour Dudgeon Lakes Provincial Park =

Park in British Columbia, Canada

Harbour Dudgeon Provincial Park
- IUCN category II (national park)
- Location within British Columbia
- Interactive map of Harbour Dudgeon Provincial Park
- Location: Kamloops Division Yale Land District, British Columbia, Canada
- Nearest city: Clearwater, BC
- Coordinates: 51°34′21″N 119°09′28″W
- Area: 356 ha (880 acres)
- Established: April 30, 1996
- Governing body: BC Parks

Harbour Dudgeon Lakes Provincial Park is a provincial park in British Columbia, Canada, located west of the Adams River, northwest of Celista Mountain. It was established on April 30, 1996. The park is located approximately 175 km northeast of Kamloops.
