= Tumtum Lake =

- Location within British Columbia
- Location: British Columbia, Canada
- Coordinates: 51.8761°N 119.1209°W
- Type: lake

Tumtum Lake is a small lake located in the Upper Adams River valley in the Interior of British Columbia, Canada. It is a popular fishing lake, containing rainbow trout, bull trout, and whitefish. "Tumtum" is a Chinook Jargon word for "heart", or the "pulsing of the heart", and may refer to the sound of the waterfalls on the Upper Adams River downstream from the lake.

== See also ==
- List of lakes of British Columbia
