= Canvas Creek =

- Location in British Columbia
- Etymology: unknown

Location
- Country: Canada
- Province: British Columbia
- Region: British Columbia Interior
- Land District: Kamloops Division Yale

Physical characteristics
- Source
  - coordinates: 52°23′32″N 119°24′34″W
  - elevation: 2,006 m (6,581 ft)
- Mouth: North Thompson River
  - coordinates: 52°28′50″N 119°17′28″W
  - elevation: 775 m (2,543 ft)

Basin features
- River system: Fraser River

Canvas Creek is a stream in Kamloops Division Yale Land District in the Interior region of British Columbia, Canada. It is in the Pacific Ocean drainage basin and is a right tributary of the North Thompson River.

The creek begins on an unnamed alpine slope at an altitude of 206 metres (676 ft) and flows mostly northeast, before curving around to a northwesterly direction to reach its mouth at the North Thompson River, at an altitude of 775 metres (2,543 ft), at a point 11 kilometres (6.8 mi) west and upstream of the confluence of that river with the Albreda River and about the same distance from British Columbia Highway 5. The North Thompson River flows via the Thompson River and the Fraser River to the Pacific Ocean. The mouth of the stream just extends into North Thompson Oxbows Manteau Provincial Park.

The name of the creek was officially catalogued on January 29, 1962, based on the name appearing on earlier maps from 1932 and 1942. The origin of the name is unknown.
