= Pyramid Creek (North Thompson River tributary) =

Canadian tributary

Coordinates: 52°21′11″N 119°10′22″W

Pyramid Creek is a tributary of the North Thompson River originating from the Serpentine Névé in the Columbia Mountains of southeastern British Columbia, Canada. At the mouth of Pyramid Creek on the eastern side of the North Thompson River between the communities of Blue River and Valemount is Pyramid Creek Falls Provincial Park.
