= Pyramid Creek Falls Provincial Park =

Pyramid Creek Falls Provincial Park is a provincial park in British Columbia, Canada, located on the east side of the North Thompson River between the towns of Blue River (S) and Valemount (N).

== The Falls ==
Pyramid Creek Falls
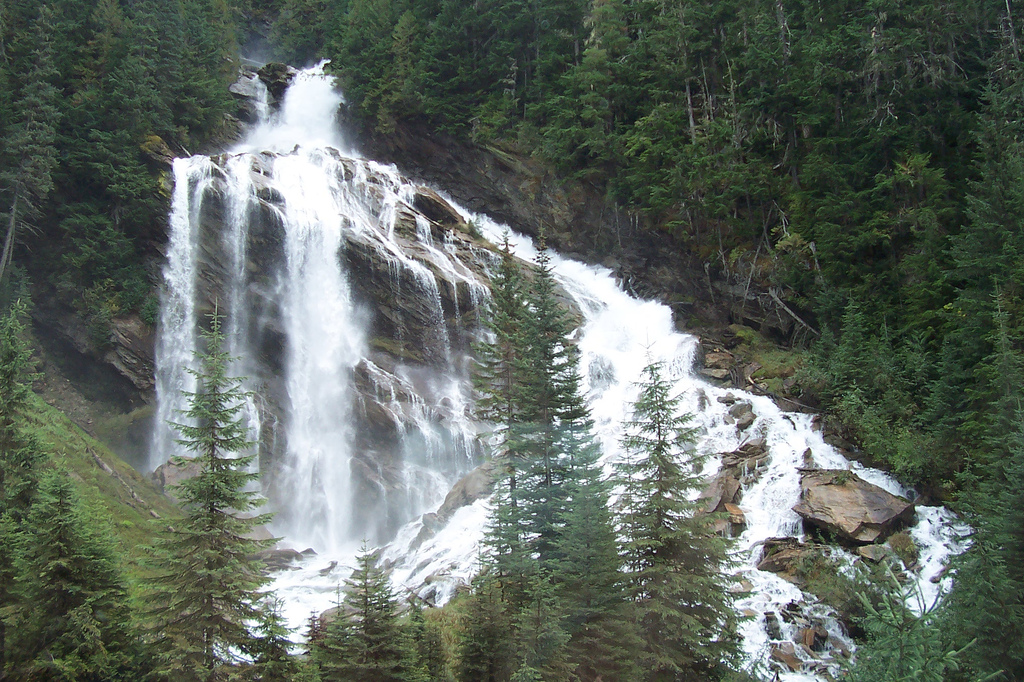
- Pyramid Falls viewed from the Canadian.
- Interactive map of Pyramid Creek Falls
- Location: Near Blue River
- Coordinates: 52°21′19″N 119°10′04″W
- Elevation: Tiered
- Total height: 300 feet (91 m)
- Number of drops: 2
- Total width: 150 feet (46 m)
- Watercourse: Pyramid Creek

Pyramid Creek Falls occurs where glacier-fed Pyramid Creek tumbles out of a hanging valley & into the North Thompson River. The falls are, in total, about 300 feet high & drop that distance in 2 large drops. The second & largest of the 2 drops fans out near the bottom in the shape of a pyramid, hence its name. The creek, after dropping over the falls, flows under the railway tracks & joins the North Thompson.

== Access ==
Access to the falls and its respective park is difficult. The falls and park are located on the opposite side of the river from Highway 5, forcing most visitors to settle for views of the falls from across the river. However, passengers on Via Rail trains (most notably The Canadian) are able to get a close-up view of the falls as the train track run past the falls. The approach to the falls is announced by a crew member when approached from both east and west and the train slows down to allow passengers a better view.
