= Adams River (British Columbia) =

River in British Columbia, Canada

Coordinates: 50°54′N 119°33′W

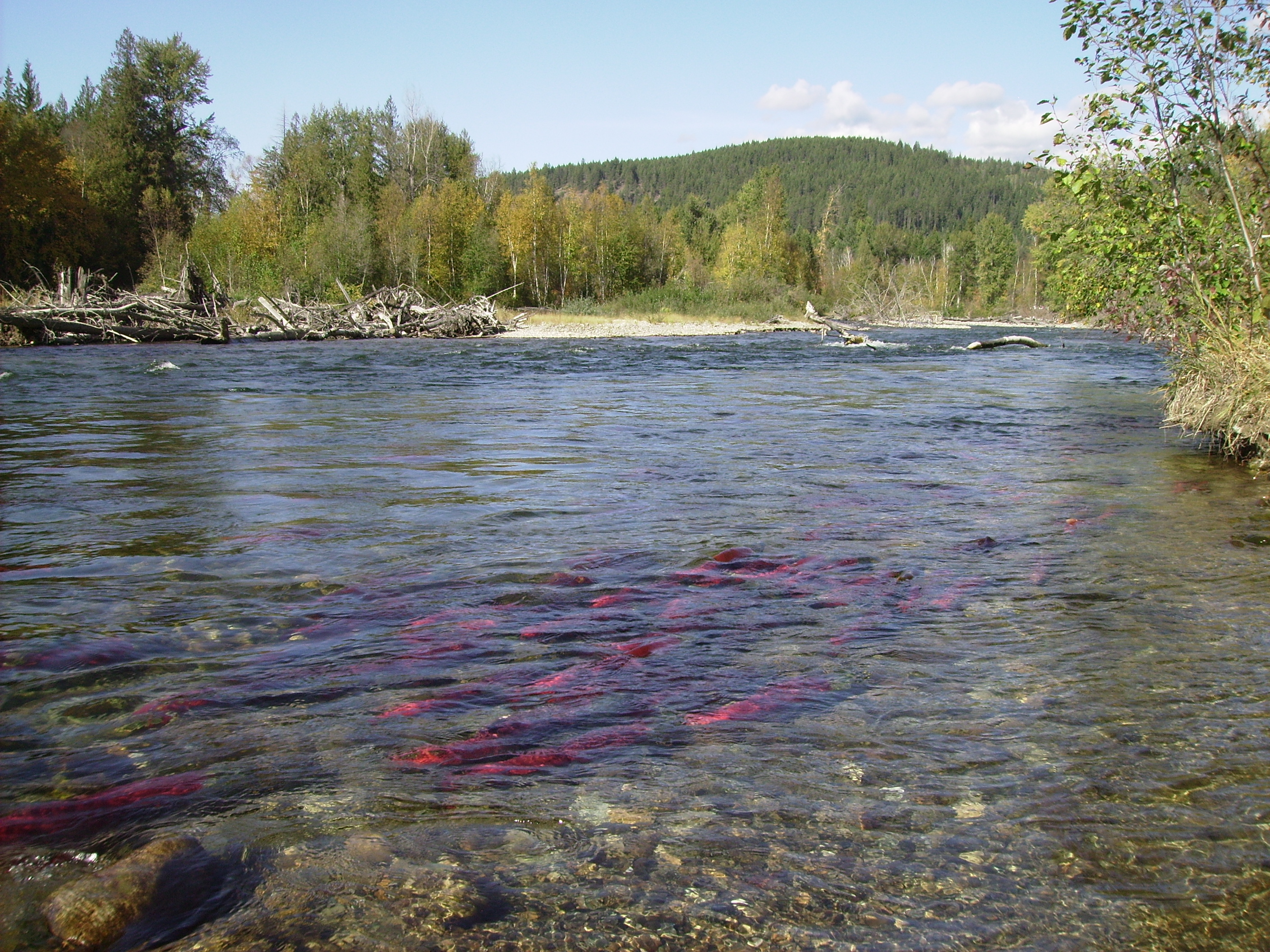
- The Lower Adams during the salmon run

- Location within British Columbia Location within Canada

Location
- Country: Canada
- Province: British Columbia
- Land District: Kamloops Division Yale
- Region: Interior

Physical characteristics
- Source: Monashee Range
  - location: British Columbia, Canada
- Mouth
  - location: Shuswap Lake, British Columbia, Canada
- Length: 177 km (110 mi) (includes Adams Lake)
- Basin size: 2,860 km^{2} (1,100 sq mi)
- Discharge
  - location: Shuswap Lake
  - minimum: 15 m^{3}/s (530 cu ft/s)
  - maximum: 386–473 m^{3}/s (13,600–16,700 cu ft/s)

Adams River is a tributary to the Thompson and Fraser Rivers in British Columbia, Canada. Beginning in the Monashee Mountains to the north, the Upper Adams River flows mainly southward and eventually reaches Adams Lake. The Lower Adams River begins at the southern end of the lake and flows into the extreme western end of Shuswap Lake. The river is one of the most important sockeye salmon breeding areas in North America. The run occurs in mid-October and can bring millions of fish to a concentrated area near the river mouth. Excavations of Secwepemc villages on the river have shown a long tradition of habitation and salmon fishing in the area. The river also served as an important transportation route for early logging operations in the watershed.

== Course ==
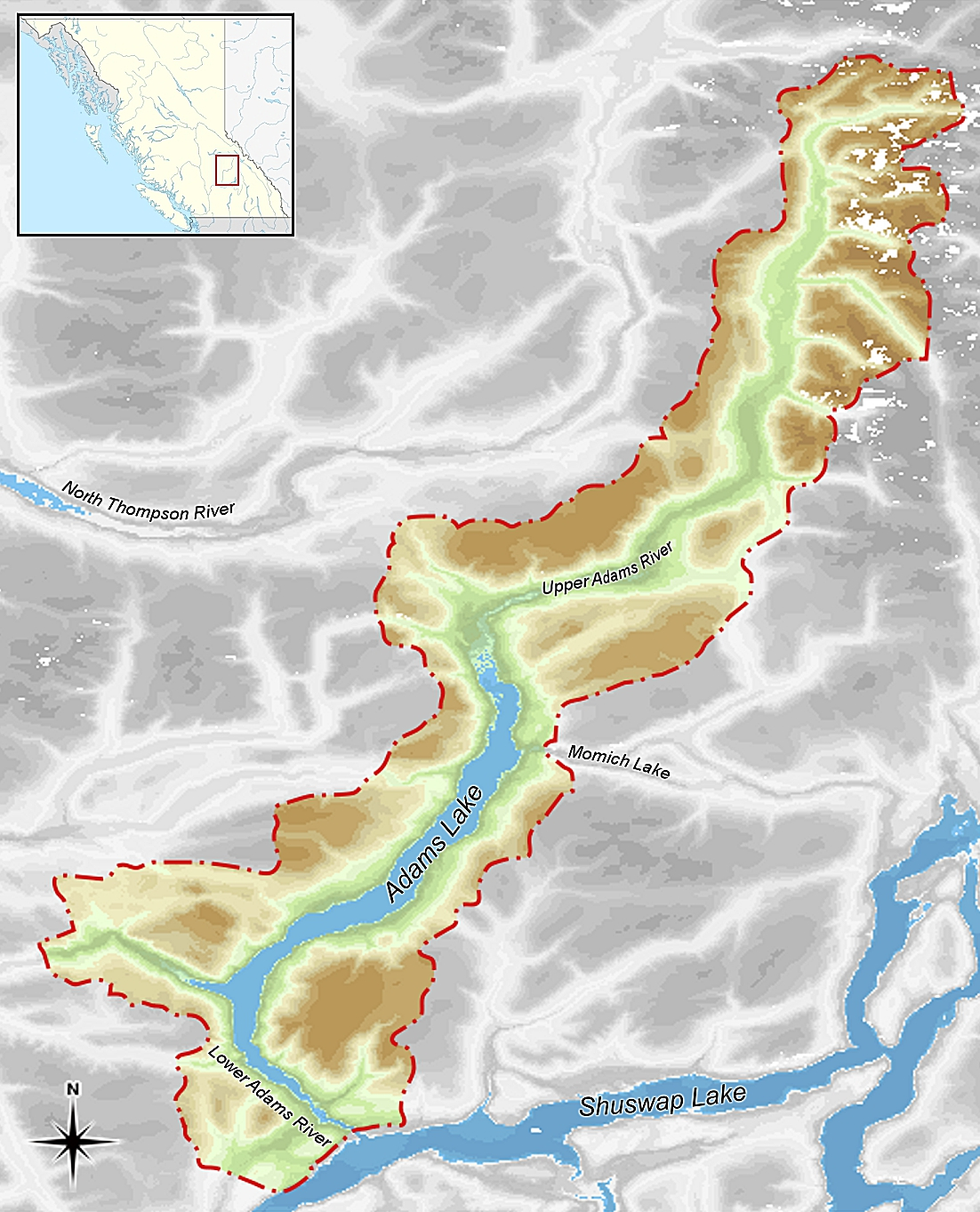
Drainage basin of the Adams River

The headwaters of the Adams are several unnamed glaciers at roughly 2,000 metres (6,600 ft) elevation in the northern region of the Monashee Range of the Columbia Mountains. The upper portion of the river flows roughly south and southwest through wetlands and passes through two small lakes, Tumtum and Mica. It has sections of rapids and whitewater, and flows over cataracts below Tumtum Lake. Its flow drops by 5 metres (16 ft) per kilometre in certain sections. After travelling for 94 kilometres (58 mi) and entering the Shuswap Highland, it enters the northern end of Adams Lake.

Adams Lake is roughly 72 kilometres (45 mi) along its north–south axis, and reaches a maximum depth of 457 metres (1,499 ft), making it the 24th deepest lake in the world. The Lower Adams issues from the extreme southern end of the lake and travels 11 kilometres (6.8 mi) through a narrow valley. It empties into Shuswap Lake near the community of Squilax. From Adams Lake to the Shuswap, the Lower Adams drops 60 metres (200 ft) in elevation.

=== Tributaries ===
Tributaries of the Upper Adams include:

- Oliver Creek
- Dudgeon Creek
- Sunset Creek
- Fisher Creek

Adams Lake and the Lower Adams are fed by:

- Cayenne Creek
- Sinmax Creek
- Momich River
- Hiuihill (Bear) Creek
- Nikwikwaia (Gold) Creek

== History ==
=== Secwepemc ===
The Secwepemc people have lived in the Adams River valley for millennia. A 1977 study by the provincial government along the lower river found sixty-six sites with evidence of habitation dating to 2000 BCE. The abundance of the salmon run made the river an important food source and trade commodity for First Nations people in the region.

Ethnographer James Teit records that the people of the Adams River area formed a sub-group of the Secwepemc called the "Sxste'lln", now known as the Adams Lake Indian Band. The Sxste'lln moved between summer and winter camps at the outlet of the lower river and the Little River area near Chase. The river's namesake, Chief Sel-howt-ken (baptized as Adam by Oblate missionaries) was a Sxste'lln leader in the 1860s. Like more than 200 of his people, he died in the 1862 smallpox epidemic.

=== Adams River Lumber Company ===
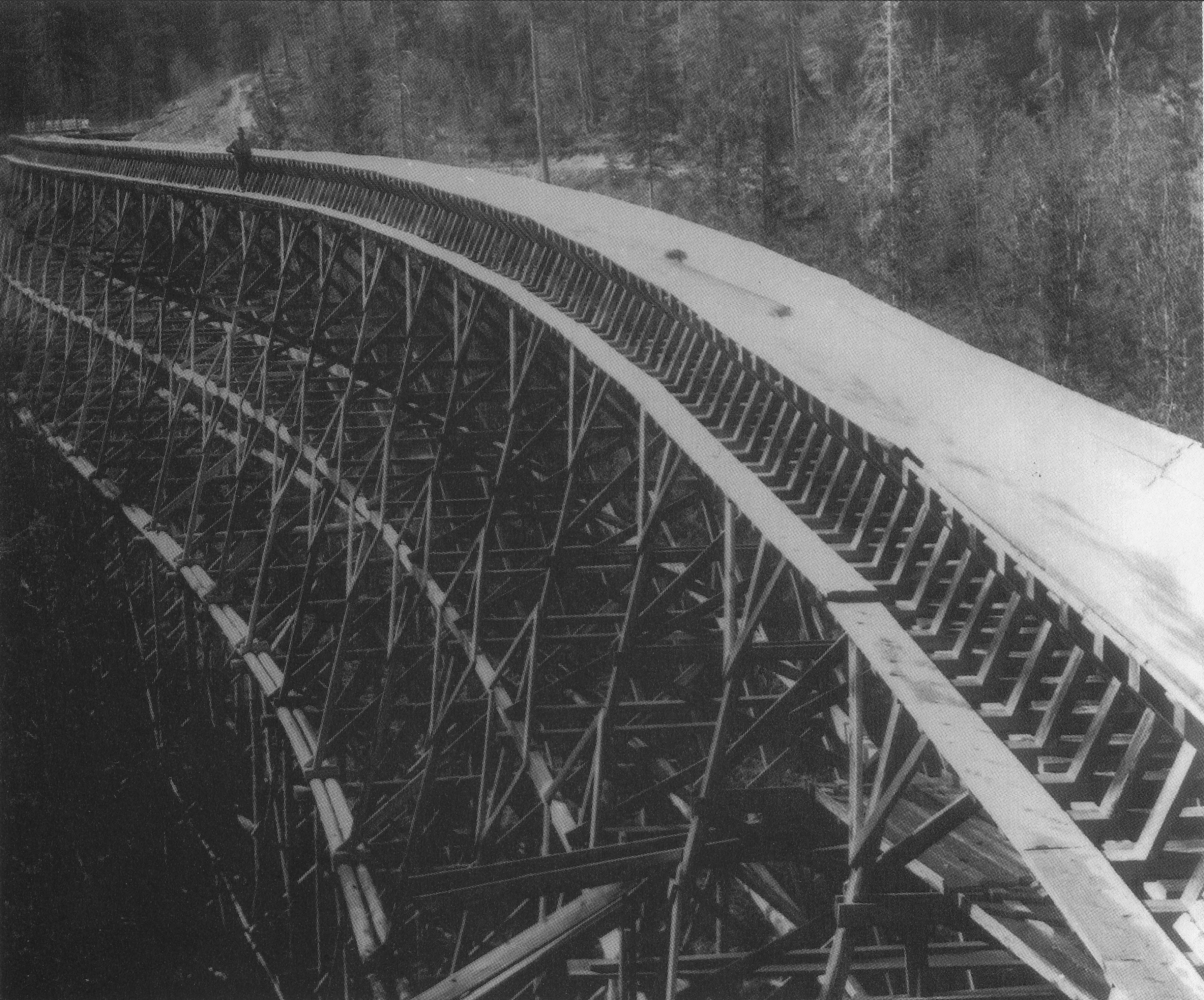
Bear Creek flume, c.1910

Although prospectors, surveyors, and trappers had travelled the region in the 1800s, the first large scale activity in the river valley by Europeans was logging. J.P. McGoldrick, an experienced lumberman from Spokane, established the Adams River Lumber Company in 1909. He licensed large tracts of timber along both the Upper and Lower rivers, as well as the surrounding plateau. McGoldrick's company is described as the first major industrial operation in the British Columbia Interior.

A camp was built on the upper river and logging operations began at Tumtum Lake. The cut logs were run down the river, then towed in booms by the company owned sternwheeler Helen down Adams Lake. The logs then were run down the Lower river to the mill at Chase. In 1908, Adams River Logging constructed a "splash dam" at the outlet of the Lower Adams. This dam allowed operators to raise the water level of Adams Lake. When sufficient logs had been collected above the dam, the gates were opened and the resulting flood carried the logs to Shuswap Lake. This proved to be destructive to the salmon run as it damaged the gravel beds the fish use to spawn.

In order to move logs from the plateau above the Lower river, Adams River Lumber constructed several flumes. The flumes were elevated wooden troughs filled with water that floated logs down to the valley bottom. The largest of these was at Bear Creek. It incorporated trestles up to 25 metres (82 ft) high and was capable of moving 3,000,000 metres (9,800,000 ft) of logs per month. It was the largest flume in North America at its peak. The structures were dismantled after the areas became logged out. Although logging continues in the region, the Adams is no longer used for log transport.

=== Bush Creek East fire ===
In August of 2023, the lower reaches of the river were heavily impacted by the Bush Creek East wildfire. The fire destroyed forests from Hiuhill Creek southwards into Tsútswecw Provincial Park, affecting over 80% of the park's area.

== Ecology ==
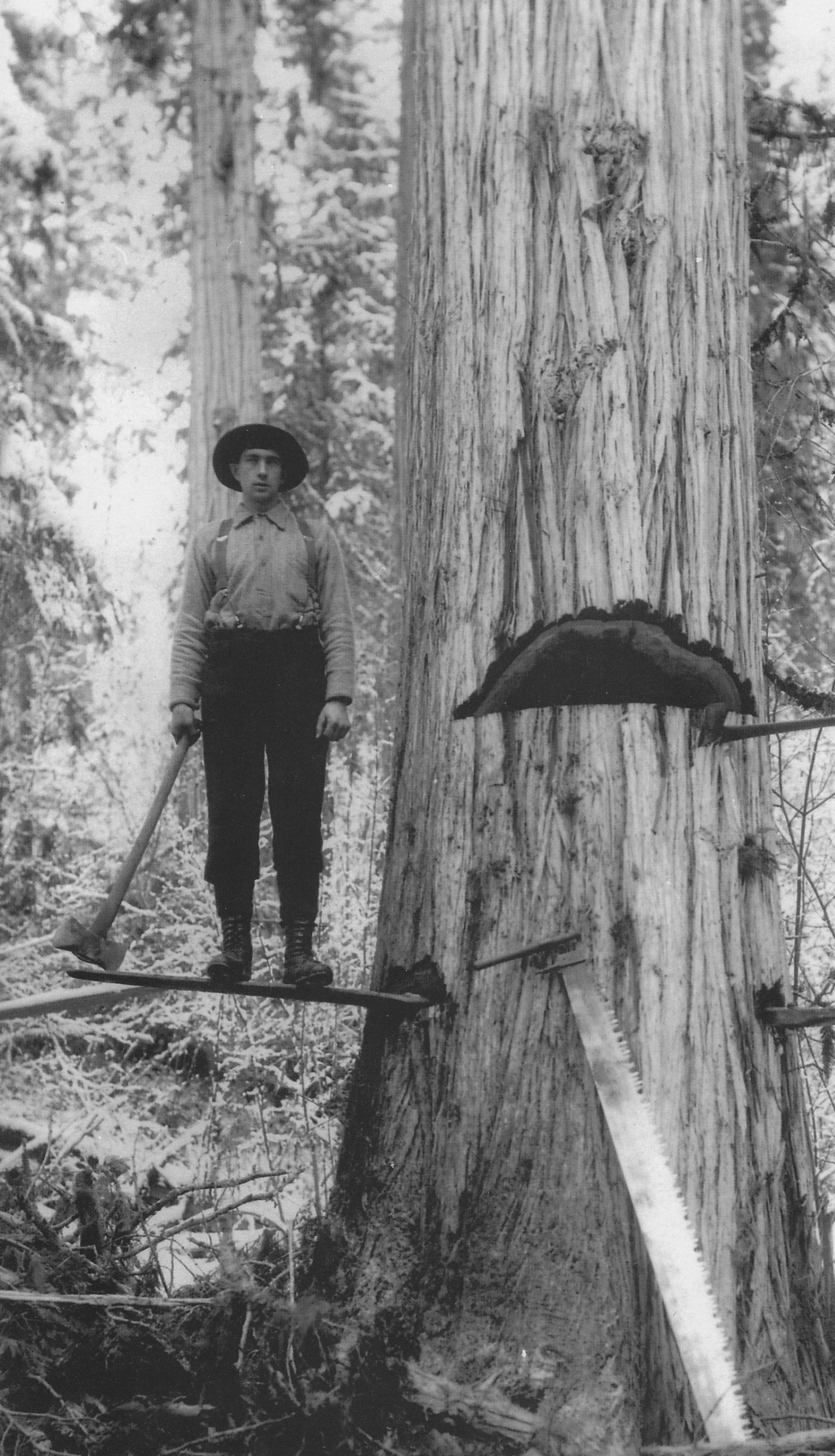
Logger falling a Western red cedar on the Upper Adams, c. 1910

=== Flora ===
Much of the ecology of the watershed has been affected by wildfires and forestry, and is considered to be in a seral phase. The river travels through several different vegetation zones. In its upper reaches, the Adams flows through the Interior Cedar Hemlock zone. These forests are similar to the coastal forests of British Columbia and contain old-growth trees up to 1,000 years in age. Old-growth stands along the river also contain rare species of lichen, likely isolated by the last Ice Age. The floodplain of the Upper Adams contains wetland species of deciduous trees such as black cottonwood as well as a dense layer of shrubs including black twinberry, red-osier dogwood, and thimbleberry. The lower river is dominated by the drier Interior Douglas Fir vegetation zone. Other conifer species present are Ponderosa pine, Engelmann spruce, and alpine fir. The area around the river mouth has been altered by human activities such as farming and livestock grazing.

=== Fauna ===
==== Sockeye salmon ====
Adams River sockeye travel from their spawning grounds to the South Thompson River, then into the Fraser River, and enter the Pacific. From the Strait of Georgia, they spend three years in the open ocean following Arctic currents to Alaska and the Aleutian Islands. They then retrace their route to the Adams, completing a round trip of over 4,000 kilometres (2,500 mi). They complete the arduous trip upstream, including navigating the swift waters and rapids of the Fraser Canyon, in just seventeen days. They do not eat during this period; instead they rely on fat reserves stored up from heavy feeding in the Strait of Georgia in the late summer. It is at this point that the salmon take on their distinctive red hue, with the male fish also developing large humped backs and aggressive hooked mouths. How they are able navigate back to their natal river is not fully understood, but a highly developed olfactory system is believed to play a part.

The alluvial gravel deposits that form the Adams river bottom are ideal for the development of salmon roe and alevins. The temperature and neutral Ph of the water is also well-suited to the sockeye. Shuswap Lake, below the river, is called a "nursery lake" by biologists due to its high concentration of picoplankton, a food source for young salmon.

Sockeye spawn in a side channel of the Adams River

==== Dominant runs ====
The Adams River run occurs every year, but every fourth year (called a "dominant" year), the numbers are much higher. 2018 was the most recent dominant run. According to Canada's Department of Fisheries and Oceans, the Fraser River sockeye run of 2010 was the largest since 1913, numbering an estimated 34 million fish. At least 3,866,000 of these fish returned to the Adams River to spawn. There is no clear consensus as to why the Adams stock has rebounded so remarkably (1991 saw an estimated return of 718 fish). In the Globe and Mail, Simon Fraser University biologist John Reynolds said "[predicting salmon numbers] is massively complex, even for a scientist."

==== Other fauna ====
The Adams River valley supports large populations of mule deer and smaller herds of white-tailed deer. Black bears are common in the watershed. The bear population and the British Columbia wolf population grows substantially during the fall as they gather from adjacent valleys to feed on the spawning salmon. In the upper river valley, Western moose are common, and the headwaters of the river contain grizzly bear habitat. Several species of aquatic mammals are found on the river, including beaver, mink, and river otter.

The river's mouth has populations of Canada geese and swans. Other waterfowl include mallards, green-winged teal, and goldeneye. The river supports Bald eagle and osprey populations, whose eyries can be seen high up in black cottonwood and dead conifers. Grouse, especially ruffed grouse, are numerous throughout the valley.

== Protected areas ==
The Adams passes through the 5,733 hectare Upper Adams River Provincial Park and the 1,076 hectare Tsútswecw Provincial Park, which provides trails and platforms for salmon viewing. Human visitors to Tsútswecw Provincial Park were estimated at 160,000 in 2010. Conservation in the watershed owes much to Roderick Haig-Brown, a Canadian conservationist, writer and a member of the International Pacific Salmon Fisheries Commission.

== See also ==
- List of rivers of British Columbia
