= Epsom Provincial Park =

Park in Canada

- IUCN category II (national park)
- Location within British Columbia
- Interactive map of Epsom Provincial Park
- Location: Kamloops Division Yale Land District, British Columbia, Canada
- Nearest city: Ashcroft, BC
- Coordinates: 50°34′27″N 121°18′13″W
- Area: 74 ha (180 acres)
- Established: July 23, 1997
- Governing body: BC Parks

Epsom Provincial Park is a provincial park in British Columbia, Canada, located west of Ashcroft around Oregon Jack Hill.

== See also ==
- Oregon Jack Provincial Park
