= North Thompson Oxbows Manteau Provincial Park =

Provincial park in British Columbia, Canada

- IUCN category III (natural monument or feature)
- Location within British Columbia
- Interactive map of North Thompson Oxbows Manteau Provincial Park
- Location: Thompson-Nicola Regional District, British Columbia, Canada
- Nearest city: Valemount
- Coordinates: 52°29′30″N 119°19′30″W
- Area: 515 ha (1,270 acres)
- Created: April 30, 1996
- Operator: BC Parks
- Website: bcparks.ca/explore/parkpgs/n_thm_mn/

North Thompson Oxbows Manteau Provincial Park is a provincial park in Thompson-Nicola Regional District in the Interior region of British Columbia, Canada. The park was established on April 30, 1996, and has an area of 515 hectares (1,270 acres). It protects "…floodplain wetlands, numerous oxbow lakes, sandbars, back channels, levees, along the glacier-fed North Thompson River". There are no camping or day-use facilities.

The mouth of Canvas Creek is located in the park.

The companion North Thompson Oxbows East Provincial Park is 1 kilometre (0.62 mi) east and downstream. A third park of similar name, North Thompson Oxbows Jensen Island Provincial Park, is 250 kilometres (160 mi) south and downstream, about 20 kilometres (12 mi) north of Kamloops.
