= Pritchard Provincial Park =

Canadian provincial park

- IUCN category II (national park)
- Location within British Columbia
- Interactive map of Pritchard Provincial Park
- Location: British Columbia, Canada
- Nearest city: Chase
- Coordinates: 50°41′02″N 119°49′59″W
- Area: 0.43 km^{2} (0.17 sq mi)
- Established: July 23, 1997
- Governing body: BC Parks

Pritchard Provincial Park is a provincial park in British Columbia, Canada, located on the north side of the South Thompson River between the communities of Monte Creek, to the west, and Chase, to the east. The park lies approximately 40 kilometres (25 mi) northeast of the city of Kamloops. The park itself is split into two geographically separated sections.

The best access to the park is from the water, as it is surrounded by private land. The area in between the park's boundaries is supposedly under the Province of British Columbia's jurisdiction, but is not part of the Provincial Park itself.
