= Chu Chua Cottonwood Provincial Park =

Provincial park in British Columbia, Canada

- IUCN category II (national park)
- Location within British Columbia
- Interactive map of Chu Chua Cottonwood Provincial Park
- Location: Kamloops Division Yale Land District, British Columbia, Canada
- Nearest city: Little Fort, BC
- Coordinates: 51°20′29″N 120°10′18″W
- Area: 108 ha (270 acres)
- Established: April 30, 1996
- Governing body: BC Parks

Chu Chua Cottonwood Provincial Park is a provincial park in British Columbia, Canada, located 80km north of Kamloops and incorporating a group of forested islands in the floodplain of the North Thompson River.
