= Cornwall Hills Provincial Park =

Park in British Columbia, Canada

- IUCN category II (national park)
- Location within British Columbia
- Interactive map of Cornwall Hills Provincial Park
- Location: Kamloops Division Yale Land District, British Columbia, Canada
- Nearest city: Ashcroft, BC
- Coordinates: 50°41′24″N 121°27′08″W
- Area: 1,235 ha (3,050 acres)
- Established: April 30, 1996
- Governing body: BC Parks

Cornwall Hills Provincial Park is a provincial park in British Columbia, Canada, immediately west of Cache Creek, protecting part of the Cornwall Hills including their highest summit which features an old fire lookout.

== See also ==
- Blue Earth Lake Provincial Park
- Oregon Jack Provincial Park
- Hat Creek Ranch
- Marble Canyon Provincial Park
- Bedard Aspen Provincial Park
- Ashcroft Manor Ranch
