= Adams Lake Provincial Park =

Provincial park in British Columbia, Canada

- IUCN category II (national park)
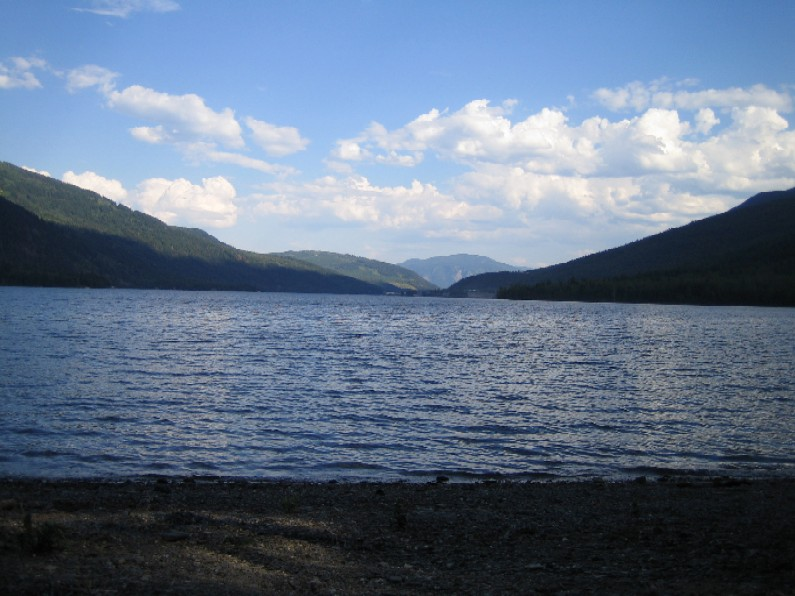
- Adams Lake seen from the park

- Location within British Columbia
- Interactive map of Adams Lake Provincial Park
- Location: Kamloops Division Yale Land District, British Columbia, Canada
- Nearest city: Kamloops, BC
- Coordinates: 51°08′21″N 119°36′32″W
- Area: 305 ha (750 acres)
- Established: January 8, 1988
- Governing body: BC Parks

Adams Lake Provincial Park is a provincial park in British Columbia, Canada. It encompasses three distinct parks: Adams Lake (Bush Creek Site) Provincial Park, Adams Lake Marine Provincial Park (Poplar Point Site), and Adams Lake Marine Provincial Park (Spillman Beach Site).

The parks are located east of Kamloops, and 30 kilometres north of Chase, or North of Kamloops and 48 kilometres east of Louis Creek. The closest communities, towns and cities to this park are Scotch Creek, Sorrento, Salmon Arm, Barriere, Chase and Kamloops.

== Adams Lake Provincial Park (Bush Creek Site) ==
The park protects beaches and shoreline on Adams Lake as well as mixed forests of aspen, birch, willow, Douglas-fir and Western redcedar. The area was established as a Recreation Area in 1988 and designated as a provincial park in 1997. The park is 56 hectares in size and is located on the southwestern shores of Adams Lake.

== Adams Lake Marine Provincial Park (Poplar Point Site) ==
The park protects a portion of Adams Lake beach and an upland forest of Douglas-fir, Western redcedar and cottonwoods. Established April 30, 1996. The Park is 32 hectares in size and is located on the east side of Adams Lake, where Bugcamp Creek enters the lake.

== Adams Lake Marine Provincial Park (Spillman Beach Site) ==
The park encompasses beach frontage along Adams Lake and the lower portion of Spillman Creek. The park contains mixed Douglas-fir and Lodgepole Pine forests, cottonwood, birch, and western red cedar. Spillman Creek contains wild rainbow trout with possible spawning habitat. Potential sockeye salmon spawning habitat. Established April 30, 1996, the Park is 139 hectares in size and is located on the east side of Adams Lake.

== See also ==
- List of British Columbia Provincial Parks
