= Banana Island Provincial Park =

Protected area in British Columbia, Canada

- IUCN category II (national park)
- Location within British Columbia
- Interactive map of Banana Island Provincial Park
- Location: Osoyoos Division Yale Land District
- Nearest city: Vernon, BC
- Coordinates: 50°43′35″N 119°46′12″W
- Area: 10.4 ha (26 acres)
- Established: April 30, 1996
- Governing body: BC Parks

Banana Island Provincial Park is a provincial park in British Columbia, Canada. It is a small 10.4 hectare island in the South Thompson River, located approximately 35 kilometres east of Kamloops. There are no camping or recreational facilities, as it is an environmentally sensitive area. The island was designated as a provincial park on April 30, 1996, following recommendations from the Kamloops Land and Resource Management Plan to protect spring salmon spawning grounds and nesting grounds for several varieties of birds. It is used for nesting by Canada geese, Osprey and bald eagles, and other waterfowl and raptors. It is also a winter habitat for Tundra and Trumpeter swans. The island is vegetated with ponderosa pine and grassy undercover, and was historically used by the Neskonlith First Nation in accessing river resources.
