= McConnell Lake Provincial Park =

Provincial park in British Columbia, Canada

- IUCN category II (national park)
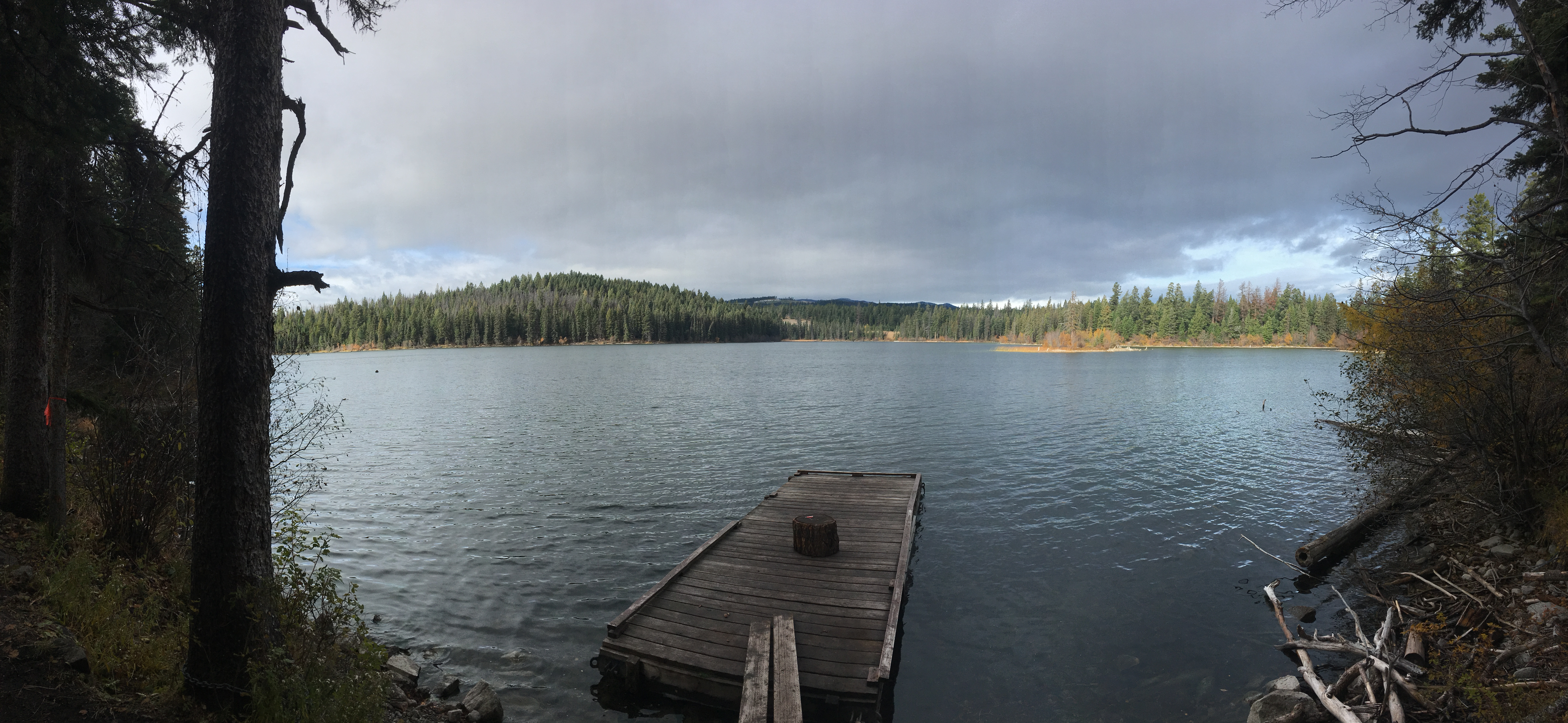
- Panoramic view

- Location within British Columbia
- Interactive map of McConnell Lake Provincial Park
- Location: British Columbia, Canada
- Nearest city: Kamloops
- Coordinates: 50°31′23″N 120°27′46″W
- Area: 1.02 km^{2} (0.39 sq mi)
- Established: October 13, 1987
- Governing body: BC Parks

McConnell Lake Provincial Park is a provincial park in British Columbia, Canada, located near Lac Le Jeune between Kamloops and Merritt, near BC Highway 5.
