= Pillar Provincial Park =

Provincial park in British Columbia, Canada

- IUCN category II (national park)
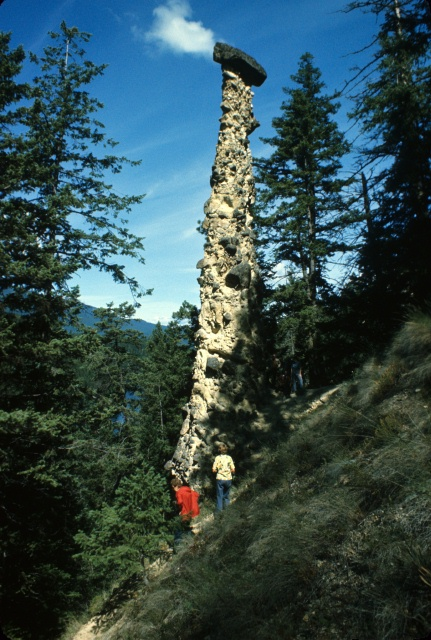
- Panoramic view

- Location within British Columbia
- Interactive map of Pillar Provincial Park
- Location: British Columbia, Canada
- Nearest city: Salmon Arm
- Coordinates: 50°35′21″N 119°37′56″W
- Area: 0.02 km^{2} (0.0077 sq mi)
- Established: March 17, 2004
- Governing body: BC Parks

Pillar Provincial Park is a provincial park in British Columbia, Canada. It is located 11 km (6.8 mi) north of Highway 97 at Falkland. The park area is 2.34 hectares and protects a stone pillar (sometimes called a hoodoo) on the hillside above Pillar Lake.

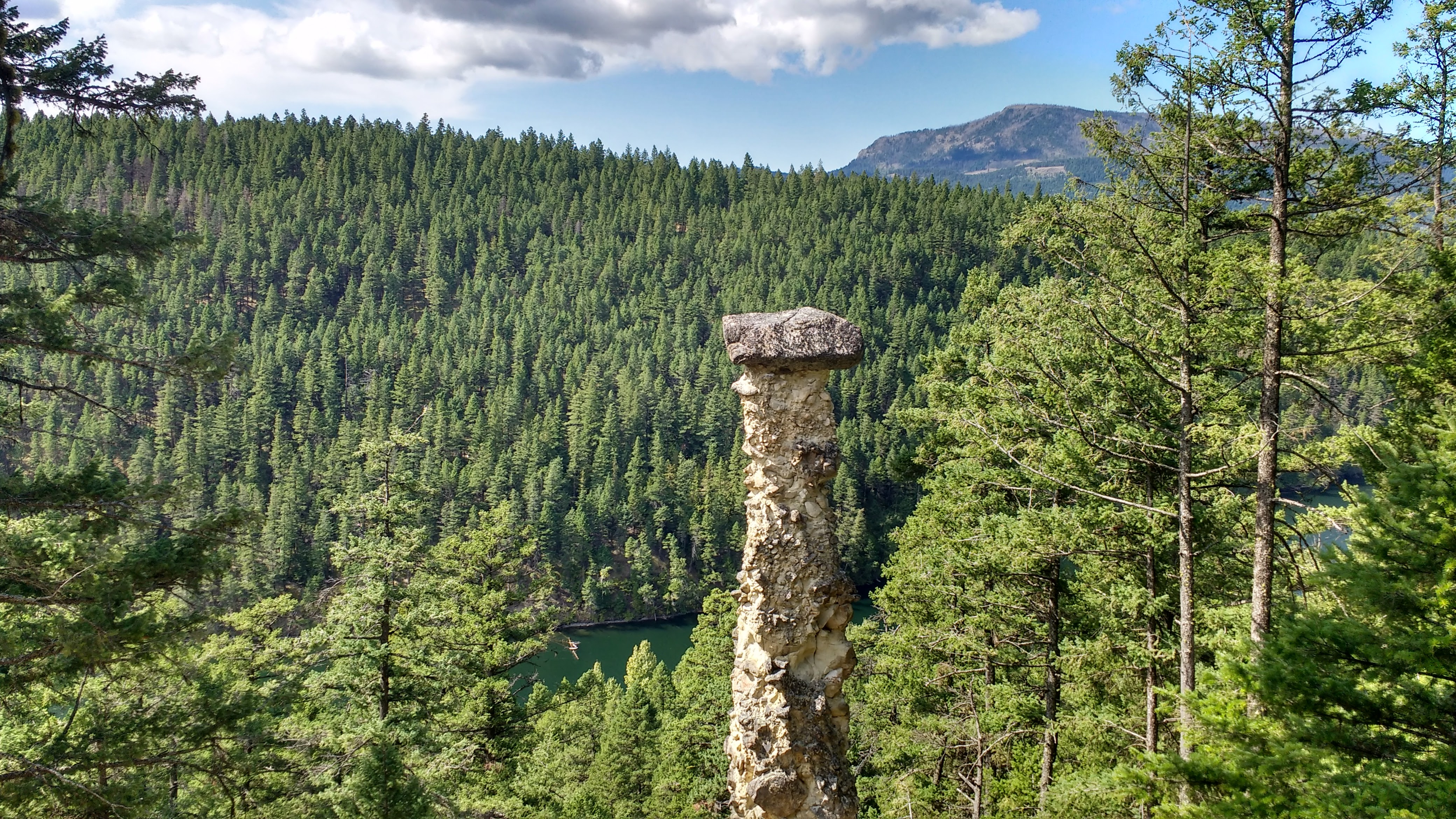
Top of stone pillar
