= Blue River Pine Provincial Park =

Provincial park in British Columbia, Canada

- IUCN category II (national park)
- Location within British Columbia
- Interactive map of Blue River Pine Provincial Park
- Location: Kamloops Division Yale Land District, British Columbia, Canada
- Nearest city: Blue River, BC
- Coordinates: 52°06′48″N 119°17′20″W
- Area: 28 ha (69 acres)
- Established: April 30, 1996
- Governing body: BC Parks

Blue River Pine Provincial Park is a provincial park in British Columbia, Canada.
