= Adams Lake =

Lake in British Columbia, Canada

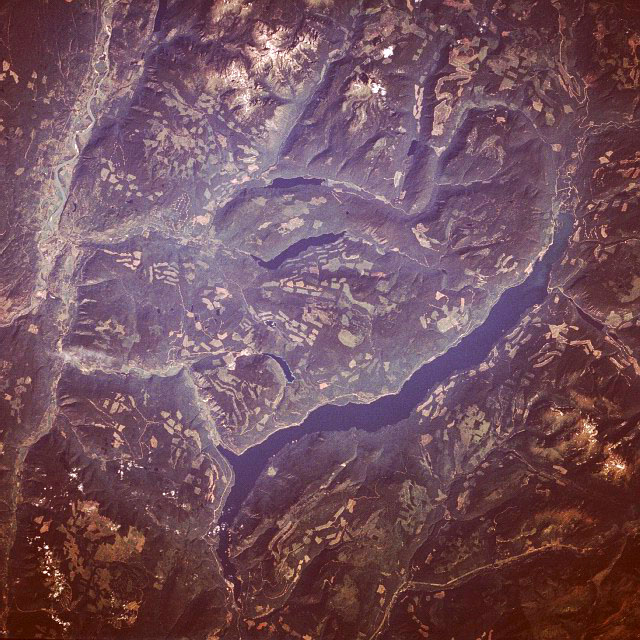
- Adams Lake from space (August 1989)

- Location within British Columbia
- Location: British Columbia
- Coordinates: 51°10′09″N 119°34′25″W
- Primary inflows: Upper Adams River, Momich River, Bush Creek
- Primary outflows: Lower Adams River
- Basin countries: Canada
- Max. length: 63 km (39 mi)
- Max. width: 3.2 km (2.0 mi)
- Surface area: 131.08 km^{2} (50.61 sq mi)
- Average depth: 299 m (981 ft)
- Max. depth: 457 m (1,499 ft)
- Water volume: 39.19 km^{3} (9.40 cu mi)
- Surface elevation: 408 m (1,339 ft)

Adams Lake is a deep, cold-water lake in south-central British Columbia, which separates the Thompson and Shuswap regions and the Thompson–Nicola and Columbia–Shuswap regional districts. The upper reaches lie in the northern Monashee Mountains, while the lower end penetrates the Shuswap Highland. The southern end is by road about 79 kilometres (49 mi) northeast of Kamloops.

== Name origin ==
On Archibald MacDonald's 1827 map, the river is called "Choo-chooach". On S. Black's 1835 map, the lake is unnamed. First Nations Chief Sel-howt-kin, who lived on the lakeshore, became a Roman Catholic. When Father Nobli baptized him, he received the name Adam. Chief Adam (sometimes spelled Atahm) was a prominent Secwepemc chief in the mid-nineteenth century. By most accounts, the lake is named after him. Adam died in the 1862 Pacific Northwest smallpox epidemic, which, according to James Teit, killed over half the local Secwepemc population.

Although Walter Moberly mentioned Adams Lake in his journal in July 1865, the earliest newspaper use of the name was September 1866. George Mercer Dawson surveyed the area in 1877, 1882, and 1898, producing maps during this period.

== First Nations ==
Pictographs found upon rock faces on opposite sides of the lake at White Bluffs and north of Tshinakin Point indicate a cultural significance of the locations. Momich Lakes Provincial Park includes culturally modified trees. A small cave up the slope was a source of ochre, which when mixed with animal fat produces ceremonial paint. Evidence of a winter village at the lake outlet and archaeological sites between Woodpole and McIvor Points have been found, indicating the importance of salmon as a food source.

The Adams Lake Band occupies the Hustalen Reserve at the southeast end of the lake, the adjacent Toops, and a small reserve at Squaam Bay. Members continue to hunt and pick berries at the north end of the lake, which is called Mumix in the Shuswap language.

== Dimensions ==
According to one account, the lake is 63 kilometres (39 mi) long and 1.6 to 3.2 kilometres (1.0 to 2.0 mi) wide. The surface elevation is 404 metres (1,325 ft) above sea level. The mean depth of 299 metres (981 ft) and maximum depth of 457 metres (1,499 ft) make the second deepest lake in BC (next to Quesnel Lake, which has a maximum depth of 511 metres (1,677 ft)) and 7th deepest lake in the world by mean depth. Another account gives a maximum depth of 397 metres (1,302 ft) and length of 72 kilometres (45 mi).

The size and depth help trap sediments entering upstream from smaller tributaries and some erosion in the Hiuihill (Bear) Creek valley. This keeps the water cool and clear, which benefits the salmon spawning habitat of the lower river.

== Geology and topography ==
The lake divides the upper and lower parts of the Adams River. A main channel and a series of smaller channels of the river enter the lake through a narrow, curved, steep-sided valley. These steep slopes become gentler toward the southern end. Other significant tributaries are the Momich River and Bush Creek.

The northwest side comprises granite igneous intrusions. These altered volcanic materials are usually grey in the lower part and green in the upper part of the series of schists. The latter also contain irregular beds of limestone.

Squaam Bay, on the west shore, is the only major indentation of the shoreline.

== Forestry ==
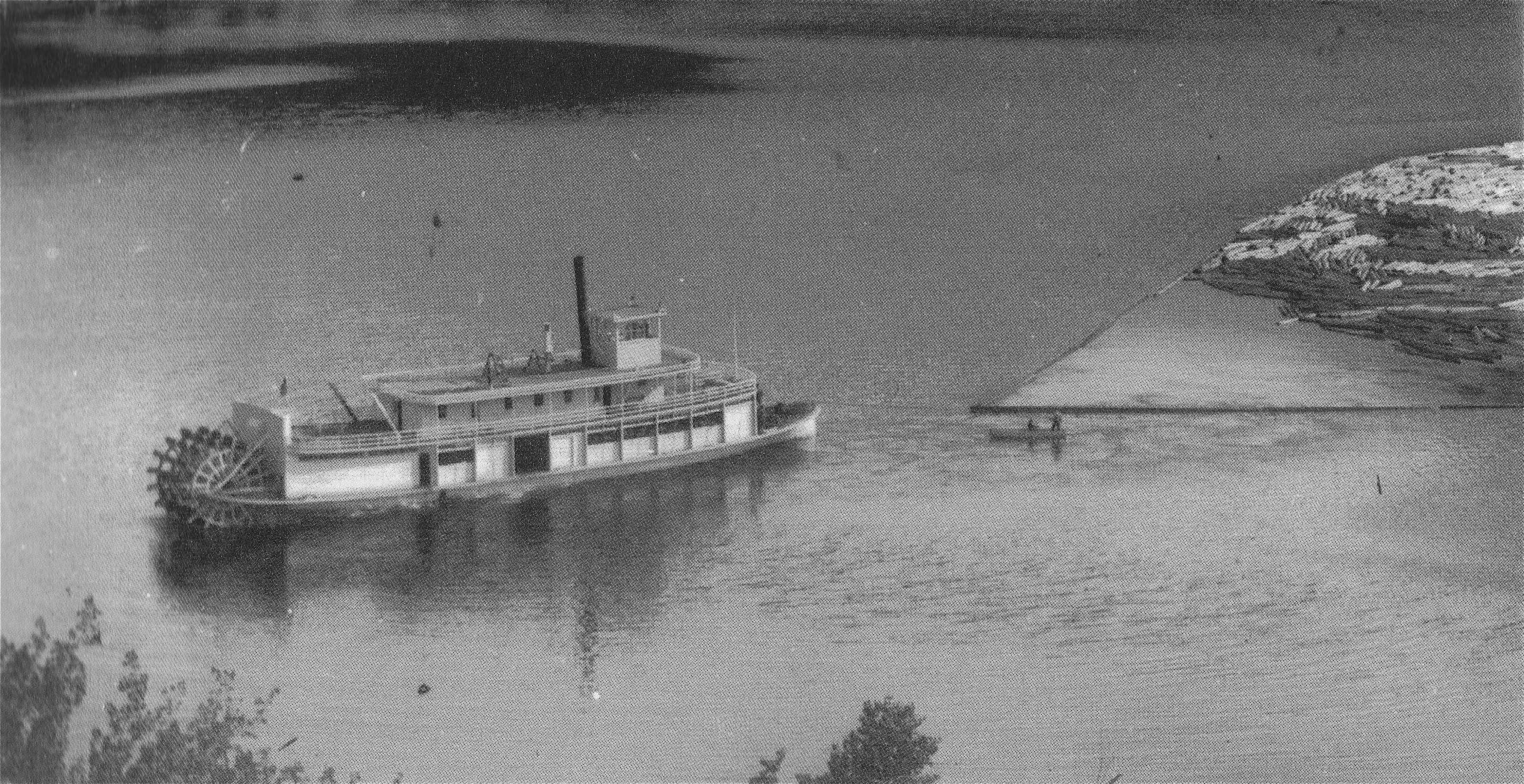
Sternwheeler A.R. Hellen towing a log boom on Adams Lake, c.1920

The Interior Cedar-Hemlock zone continues south along both sides of the lake. The primary species are western redcedar, western hemlock, Douglas-fir, Engelmann spruce, lodgepole pine, subalpine fir, hybrid white spruce, birch, and trembling aspen.

In 1907, two Americans formed the Adams River Lumber Co (ARLC), which secured 207 square kilometres (80 mi^{2}) of timber limits.

During the early 1910s, the ARLC ran two steamboats on the lake and settlers operated three gasoline-powered boats. The ARLC paddle steamer A.R. Hellen towed logs to the dam during 1909–1925. An ARLC boat skipper gave his name to Mcleod Point on the east shore.

By 1912, timber close to the shoreline became depleted, requiring log flumes for trees farther up the slopes. In 1918, the 4.5-kilometre (2.8 mi) Brennan Creek flume was erected midway up the west shore. A major logging camp existed on flat ground at the top of the flume. At various times, at least 24 ARLC logging camps were found throughout the Adams watershed.

The ARLC built wharfs at Brennan Creek and the head of the lake. In 1925, the ARLC ceased operations. Although a large economic setback for the valley, contractors continued supplying cedar poles to utility companies.

The federal forest service operated a ranger station 1906–1930 at the south end of the lake. During the 1920s and 1930s, their boat operated southward from Brennan Creek and the provincial service Aspen ran northward.

In 1942, Percy F. Tarry established a sawmill on the present mill site on the west shore at the south end of the lake. The next year, Arthur Holding became a partner. When destroyed by fire in 1945, the mill was rebuilt the same year, and the business was renamed the Holding Lumber Co.

In 1976, Interfor purchased the mill.

In the 2000s, logs continued to be barged down from a log sort area at Momich River and held in log booms at the mill. During 2007–2012, an extensive modernization cost in excess of $100 million. This included a biomass heating system installation to dry lumber and heat buildings, which consumes wood waste instead of natural gas.

During 2020–2021, a $4.3 million drying kiln was installed.

== Dam ==
Just below the outlet of the lake, a 4.6-metre (15 ft) high splash dam existed 1907–1921 to raise the lake level. In the late summer, the stored water was released to flush logs down the river to Little Shuswap Lake for the ARLC sawmill at Chase. In 1945, the dam was demolished. The dam not only impeded the early summer upper Adams salmon run from reaching its spawning area, but also harmed the late run sockeye of the lower river, because the log and water release scoured the river bottom, destroying salmon eggs.

== Ferries and bridge ==
Early settlers paddled their supplies along the lake. No regular steamer service existed. In the 1930s, George Todd of Squaam Bay carried light freight on the McLeod.

In the 1920s, David (Dave) Fraser worked on the A.R. Hellen, before later running his own tugboat business for freight and passengers. In 1927, he purchased 9.8-metre (32 ft) gasoline launch Nola, which pushed scows and towed cedar poles. He later built a larger boat, retiring in 1972. Son Frank (Ink), who took over the business, retired in 1996.

During the mid-1930s, a punt guided by rope crossed the river at the north end of the lake, which was replaced by a basket aerial cable crossing.

In 1973–74, a bridge was erected across the river at the foot of the lake.

Adams Lake has been the site of two Secwepemc blockades, one in solidarity with the Kanesatake Mohawk in 1990, and the other in March 1995, to prevent the development of a 60-unit recreational vehicle park over a Secwepemc burial ground. That June, the free access to local residents was threatened. Once the road closed, the province brought a barge and tugboat from the Arrow Lakes in mid-July. The 7 am to 8 pm ferry service, which crossed the lake on the hour, provided the only access to about 50 families, who resided or owned recreational lots on the eastern side of the lake. The Adams Lake band blocked vehicle access by removing a cattle guard. In September, arson destroyed the 87-metre (285 ft) wooden bridge over the river.

Throughout the winter, an ice-breaking tug kept a passage clear for the car ferry. Service increased to 11.5 hours daily and 16 hours on Thursdays and Fridays. In December 1996, a new cable ferry was installed, operating 18 hours a day, seven days a week. However weight restrictions prevented the ferry from carrying cement trucks.

The 6:30 am to 1 am (winter) and 6:00 am to 1 am (summer) schedule was extended in August 1998 to 22 hours daily, with emergency service available at all times.

Around 2013, WaterBridge Ferries took over from Western Pacific Marine as the service provider.

The British Columbia Ministry of Transportation and Infrastructure (MOTI) commissioned Capilano Maritime Design to partner with Waterbridge Steel Inc. in a design-build contract to supply four new cable ferries. In each, a John Deere 4045 diesel engine with 110kW output powers a DC alternator for onboard electrics and a radial piston hydraulic motor to a dual bullwheel traction winch.

Launched in 2017, the Adams Lake II was the first vessel to be delivered under the Waterbridge contract. The carrying capacity was 10 vehicles and 48 passengers.

The ferry operates under private contract with MOTI and is free of tolls, as are all inland ferries in British Columbia. Departures are on demand 24 hours per day, but 3 am to 5 am is emergencies only. The ferry capacity remains unchanged.

== Communities ==
At present, the various communities comprise a mix of permanent and seasonal residents.

=== North end ===
In the mid-1920s, the ARLC camp called the Depot closed with the company. In 1934, a group of about 50 Seventh Day Adventists (SDA) from Grants Pass, Oregon, led by Doc Jenkins, established a community in the vicinity of the camp remnants. That summer, the SDAs built homes and a dual school/church about one kilometre from the lake. That winter, Hazel Newman, the leader's daughter, gave birth to a son, contracted pneumonia, and died soon after. Despite winter snow and a summer mosquito infestation, the community persevered for two more years, before dispersing.

Over the decades, the log buildings have reduced to decayed remnants. The only lasting relic is the bronze plaque set in concrete above Hazel's grave. In 1974, Ken Harrison and his wife Carol purchased a 127-hectare (315-acre) property a few kilometres up from the lake. Three more families joined them but in like fashion left a few years later.

=== Momich River mouth ===
In 1907, Daniel L. Smith built a spacious ranch house called Cariboo Lodge as a hunting resort at the mouth of the Momich River. A few advertisements placed in eastern game magazines attracted a couple of parties in the fall. After closing for the winter, the hotel never reopened. Smith wintered in Kamloops, where he attempted to pass a forged US Treasury cheque. His true identity was found to be ex-Captain Daniel T. Keller, who had served with distinction in the US Army, but had already successfully cashed three such cheques in the US. After extradition, he received 40 years in Leavenworth.

Over the years, trappers and miners established homesteads on the limited level, low ground at the river mouth.

=== Brennan Creek area ===
Billy Brennan, was a federal timber cruiser in the region. By 1908, four or five families lived in the vicinity.

After the ARLC closure, the only remaining area resident was William (Bill) Henderson, who died in 1933. The next year, Jerome Bishop Eberts, former editor of the Vancouver Sun, and his family, moved into the two-room log cabin north of the creek. A couple of years later, they erected a larger log house.

Percy Jacques, who had arrived with them, lived for a period in a one-room shack behind the property. Leonard May, the only nearby permanent neighbour, froze to death on the lakeshore in December 1944.

When the Eberts left in 1946, recently married McGarry (Mac) Allen and wife Mabel. (Marnie) (eldest child of Dave Fraser) became the next occupants and developed their logging company. A school opened in 1958 for children of logging families. A hydroelectricity dam was installed on Spapilem Creek, which supplied power until the BC Hydro transmission lines arrived in 1975. At the old Brennan Creek landing, the present large log community hall was built in 1984. The school closed in 2012. By that time, Mac Allen's son Pat ran the logging business.

A resident for 68 years, Marnie died in 2009. The location, now known as Marnie's Bay, is an RV resort and public campground.

=== Skwaam Bay (Squaam Bay, Agate Bay) ===
The name Agate Bay, used on a 1915 map, was possibly chosen because quartz in the area resembles agate. The adjacent reserve is called Squaam, which means 'choppy waters'. In 1933, Skwaam Bay became the official name.

In 1892, three prospectors discovered the Homestake claim about 4 kilometres (2.5 mi) up Sinmax Creek. In 1895, the new mine owners built a wagon road to haul ore northwest to Louis Creek. The 1919 forest fire destroyed the mine infrastructure. About 35 kilometres (22 mi) by road west of Squaam Bay, Blucher Hall provided a general store and post office.

In 1905, Charlie and Mable Todd settled their family, registering their lakefront property in 1913. By 1906, four families lived in the immediate area. The school established in 1916, which was little more than a small shack, was replaced in 1918 by a larger one-room log building. In 1933, the school relocated closer to the Homestake mine.

In 1926, newcomer Dave Fraser married the Todd daughter Jessie. In 1938, they moved up the lake to the bay. Their large house was the hub of activities. Son Frank (Ink) was also actively involved in community responsibilities such as managing the water works and plowing snow. The school relocated back to the bay in the 1950s, closing in 1964.

Charlie and Hallie Kelly settled in 1912. Son Clinton was a resident for about 90 years.

In 1937, Tom and Evelyn LaFave arrived. In the late 1940s, they established a hunting and fishing lodge, which developed into several rental cottages for tourists. In 1964, they sold the property.

The annual Squaam Bay Fishing Derby has been held since 1955. Presently, the bay offers a resort and cabin accommodation for visitors.

=== South end ===
By 1895, a wagon road stretched about 10 kilometres (6.5 mi) northwest from Squilax to the foot of the lake.

In 1912, Frank Sturgill built the 12-room Adams Lake Hotel for the ARLC. Sturgill was the proprietor until the Potters purchased the hotel in the 1920s. A post office operated 1913–1934 at this location.

By 1944, the Adams Lake community had erected a school, a store and community hall. By the mid-1970s, student numbers had fallen too low, and the school appears to have closed around this time.

Residences exist on both shores and a Girl Guide camp and general store on the west one. Mill workers either live nearby on the lakeshore or in newer subdivisions in the hills above the lake.

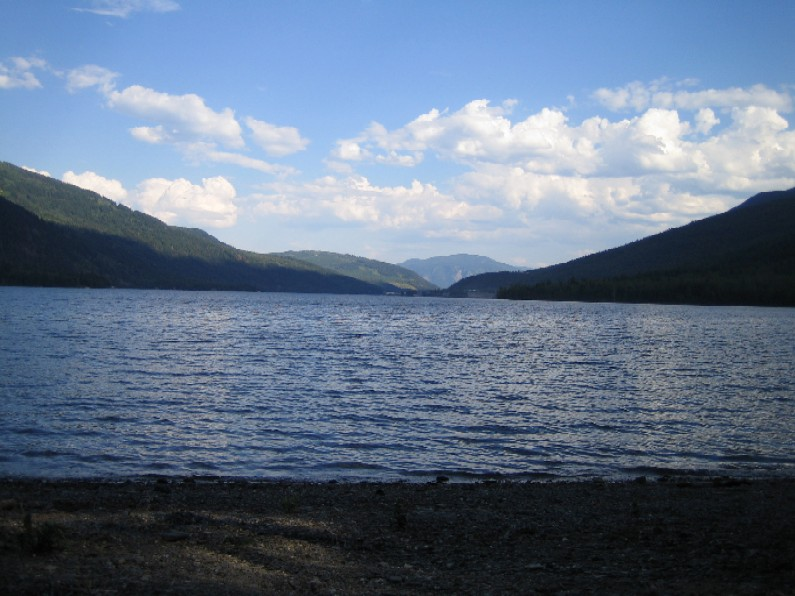
View south from Adams Lake Provincial Park, 2006.

== Recreation ==
Adams Lake Provincial Park and Momich Lakes Provincial Park occupy parts of the foreshore.

Around the lake, sockeye spawn at the mouth of Bush Creek, coho along the shorelines of the lower lake, and both along Sinmax Creek and the Momich River. Anglers also fish the lake for rainbow trout, Kokanee salmon, and bull trout.

Not as crowded as the nearby Shuswap Lake, the lake attracts recreational boating.

The area around the lake is popular with campers and is home to a large variety of flora and fauna. During the autumn and winter people hunt for game birds and big game such as mule deer, black bear, and cougar (mountain lion).

== Climate ==
- Average Hours of Sunshine: 2,000+ per year
- Average Rainfall: 304.7 mm (11 in) annually
- Average Snowfall: 139.8 cm (55 in) in the valleys. Up to 644 cm (253.5 in) on the mountains
- Frost Free Days: 120–175 days annually

Average maximum temperature (summer): 28.4 °C (84 °F) Average minimum temperature (winter): −8.8 °C (16 °F)

== Maps ==
- "BC map". www.davidrumsey.com. 1925.
- "Shell BC map". www.davidrumsey.com. 1956.
- "Adams Lake heritage map" (PDF). bcparks.ca. 2006.

== See also ==
- List of lakes of British Columbia
- List of Inland Ferries in British Columbia
