= Wire Cache Provincial Park =

Canadian provincial park

- IUCN category III (natural monument or feature)
- Location within British Columbia
- Interactive map of Wire Cache Provincial Park
- Location: British Columbia, Canada
- Nearest city: Vavenby
- Coordinates: 51°43′21″N 119°20′57″W
- Area: 50 ha (120 acres)
- Established: 1996
- Governing body: BC Parks

Wire Cache Provincial Park is a provincial park in British Columbia, Canada, located 90 km northeast of Clearwater.

In 1874 the provincial government contracted with F.J. Barnard to build a telegraph line from Cache Creek to Edmonton. A lawsuit ensued when the government cancelled the contract in 1878. A great deal of wire was abandoned in this area as a result.

== Recreation ==
The park offers boating and fishing on the North Thompson River.

== Geography ==
The park is located on a series of riverbends. There is an assortment of wildlife and wetland habitat, as well as cottonwood, spruce and cedar tree ecosystems.
