= Mud Lake Delta Provincial Park =

Provincial park in British Columbia, Canada

- IUCN category III (natural monument or feature)
- Location within British Columbia
- Interactive map of Mud Lake Delta Provincial Park
- Location: Thompson-Nicola RD, British Columbia
- Nearest city: Blue River
- Coordinates: 52°07′16″N 119°09′43″W
- Area: 500 ha (1,200 acres)
- Created: 30 April 1996
- Governing body: BC Parks

Mud Lake Delta Provincial Park is a provincial park in British Columbia, Canada, located in the North Thompson Country due east of Blue River, 230 km from Kamloops on BC Highway 5.
