= Kentucky Alleyne Provincial Park =

Provincial park in British Columbia

- IUCN category II (national park)
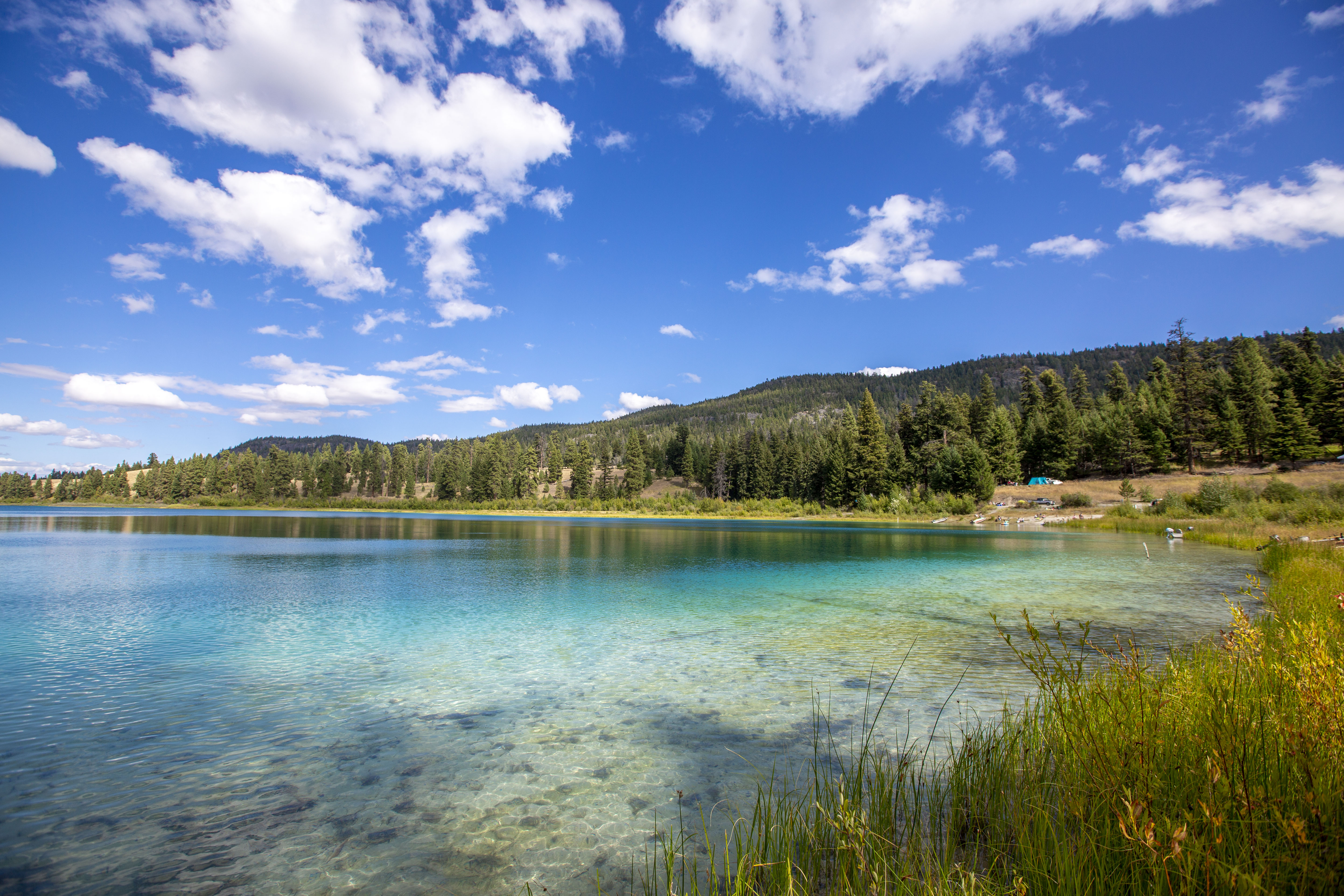

- Location within British Columbia
- Interactive map of Kentucky Alleyne Provincial Park
- Coordinates: 49.9167°N 120.5708°W
- Area: 190 ha (470 acres)
- Designation: Provincial park
- Created: March 5, 1981; 45 years ago
- Website: www.env.gov.bc.ca/bcparks/explore/parkpgs/kentucky_alleyne/

Kentucky Alleyne Provincial Park is a provincial park in British Columbia. The park is located 38 kilometres south of the city of Merritt, and east of the community of Aspen Grove. The park is named for two of its largest lakes, Kentucky Lake and Alleyne Lake. All lakes in the park have a distinctive turquoise colouration.

== History ==
The park was established March 5, 1981. The park is nearly surrounded by the 115-year-old Douglas Lake Ranch, Canada's largest cattle ranch.

== Geography ==
The park is 190 hectares (470 acres) in size. A number of kettle lakes, eskers and fluvial outwash deposits demonstrate the glacial activity that helped form the landscape. The two largest lakes in the park, Kentucky Lake and Alleyne Lake, have a turquoise colour and are surrounded by rolling grasslands and dry open forest.

Kentucky Lake has a maximum depth of 40.5 metres (133 ft) and area of approximately 35.6 hectares (88 acres). The park intersects the northern end of the lake, covering approximately one-third of its area.

Alleyne Lake is larger and shallower, with a surface area of 54.6 hectares (135 acres) and maximum depth of 35.6 metres (117 ft). The park covers the southern end of the Alleyne Lake, extending northward along its western side.

== Ecology ==
Large, mature Douglas fir and Ponderosa pine are found in the park. The park is also vegetated with aspen and juniper shrubs.

Species of waterfowl in the park include goldeneye, mallard, Green-winged teal, and grebes. Hawks and falcons can be found in the park, as well as the Blue-listed Columbian sharp-tailed grouse. Jack rabbits and ground squirrels prefer the cover of aspen and juniper. The lakes in the park are stocked with rainbow trout.

Western toad, a species of special concern in Canada, live and breed in the park. To reduce mortality of juvenile toads during their migration in summer, some trails (and occasionally campsites) are closed for a few weeks. Toad underpasses and fencing have been tested in the park, with some success reducing toadlet mortality from vehicles.

== Recreation ==
Kentucky Alleyne Provincial Park is a destination for vehicle camping, boating, canoeing, kayaking and fishing. The park has 79 campsites, 1 of which is a group site.

== Gallery ==
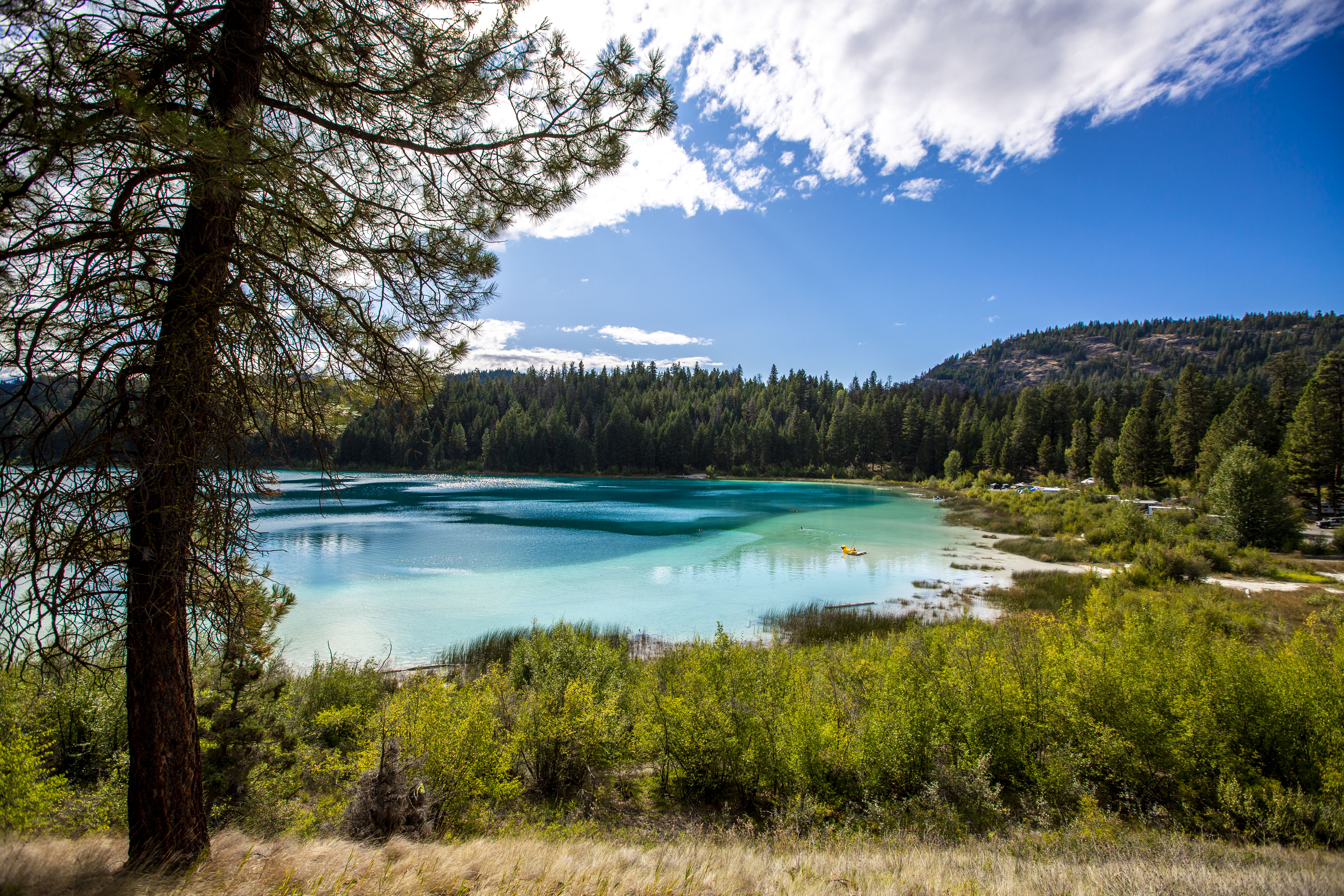
Looking west at the north end of Kentucky Lake, with the campground on the right

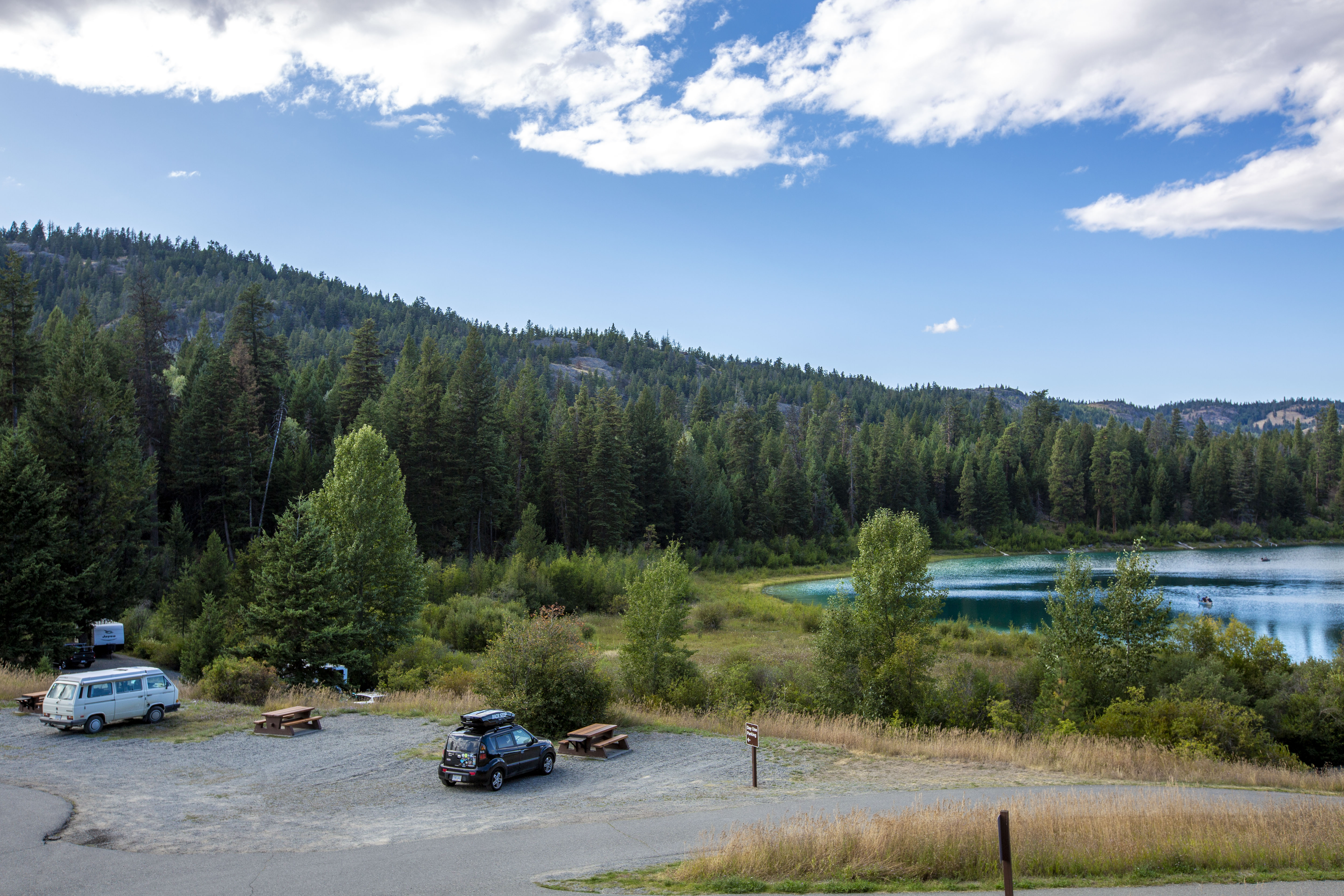
View northwest over picnic area, with Alleyne Lake on the right

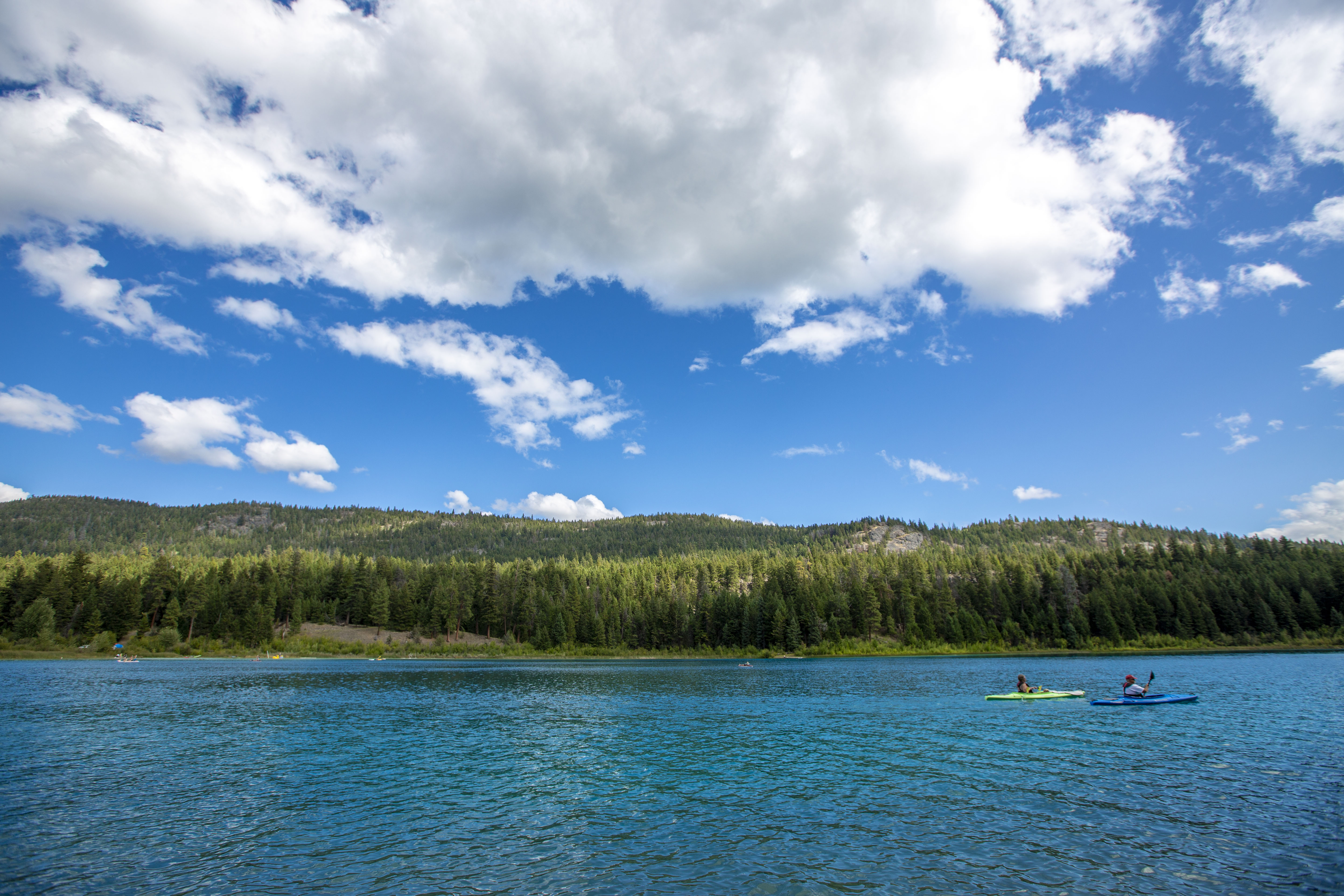
Kayakers in the park

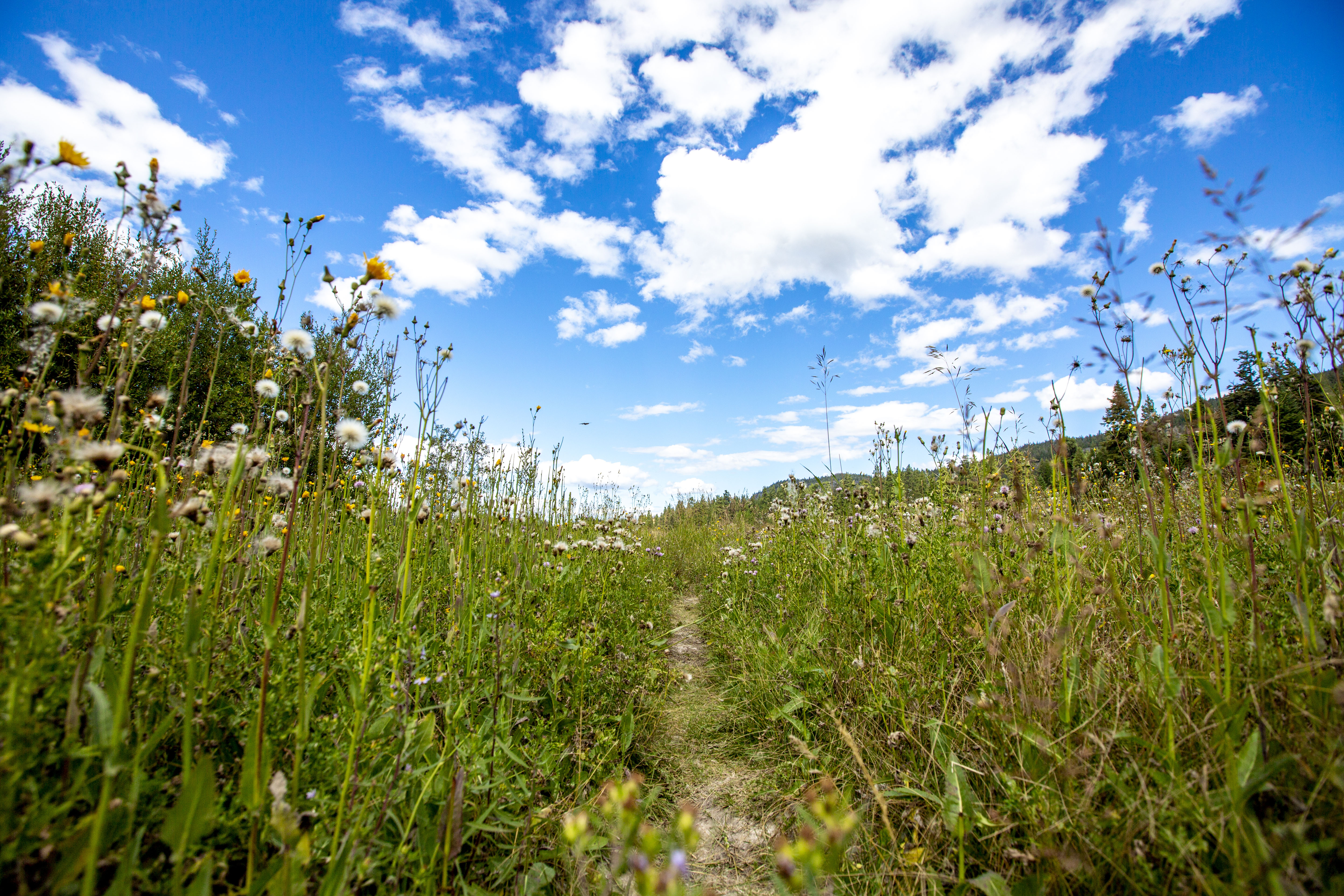
Looking along a park trail

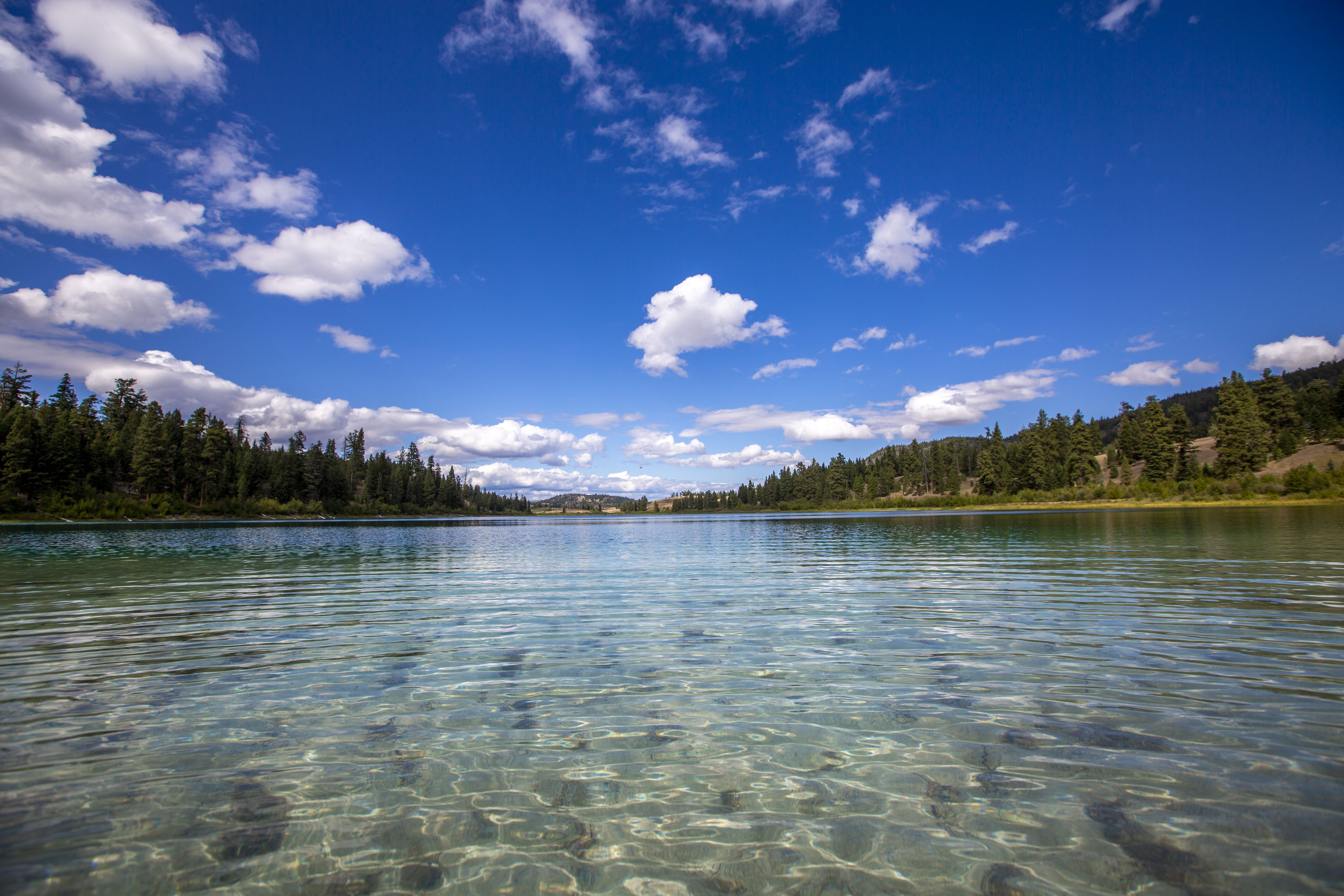
Lake view

== See also ==
- List of British Columbia Provincial Parks
- List of Canadian provincial parks
