= North Thompson Oxbows Jensen Island Provincial Park =

Provincial park in British Columbia, Canada

- IUCN category III (natural monument or feature)
- Location within British Columbia
- Location: Thompson-Nicola Regional District, British Columbia, Canada
- Nearest city: Kamloops
- Coordinates: 50°52′20″N 120°17′01″W
- Area: 30 ha (74 acres)
- Created: April 30, 1996
- Operator: BC Parks
- Website: bcparks.ca/explore/parkpgs/n_thm_jn/

North Thompson Oxbows Jensen Island Provincial Park is a provincial park in Thompson-Nicola Regional District in the Interior region of British Columbia, Canada, about 20 kilometres (12 mi) north of Kamloops at the community of Heffley Creek. The park was established on April 30, 1996, and has an area of 30 hectares (74 acres). It protects the riparian habitat of a single, seasonal oxbow on the right bank of the North Thompson River. There are no camping or day-use facilities.

The park is named in part for Kamloops lawyer Peter Jensen. Jensen and his wife lived on the island created by the oxbow since their marriage in 1968. Jensen died in 2011.

Two parks on the North Thompson River that also protect oxbow features, North Thompson Oxbows Manteau Provincial Park and North Thompson Oxbows East Provincial Park, are located next to each other about 250 kilometres (160 mi) north and upstream.
