= North Thompson Oxbows East Provincial Park =

Provincial park in British Columbia, Canada

- IUCN category III (natural monument or feature)
- Location within British Columbia
- Interactive map of North Thompson Oxbows East Provincial Park
- Location: Thompson-Nicola Regional District, British Columbia, Canada
- Nearest city: Valemount
- Coordinates: 52°28′54″N 119°14′39″W
- Area: 288 ha (710 acres)
- Created: April 30, 1996
- Operator: BC Parks
- Website: bcparks.ca/explore/parkpgs/n_thm_e/

North Thompson Oxbows East Provincial Park is a provincial park in Thompson-Nicola Regional District in the Interior region of British Columbia, Canada. The park was established on April 30, 1996, and has an area of 288 hectares (710 acres). The park protects a productive area of the North Thompson River lowlands that has high species diversity. There are patches of old-growth forest containing hybrid white spruce and subalpine fir. There are no camping or day-use facilities.

The companion North Thompson Oxbows Manteau Provincial Park is 1 kilometre (0.62 mi) west and upstream. A third park of similar name, North Thompson Oxbows Jensen Island Provincial Park, is 250 kilometres (160 mi) south and downstream, about 20 kilometres (12 mi) north of Kamloops.
