= North Thompson Islands Provincial Park =

Provincial park in British Columbia, Canada

- IUCN category II (national park)
- Location within British Columbia
- Interactive map of North Thompson Islands Provincial Park
- Location: British Columbia, Canada
- Nearest city: Little Fort
- Coordinates: 51°22′14″N 120°10′59″W
- Area: 0.78 km^{2} (0.30 sq mi)
- Established: April 30, 1996
- Governing body: BC Parks

North Thompson Islands Provincial Park is a provincial park in the North Thompson River of British Columbia, Canada. The park is only accessible by boat.
