= Roche Lake Provincial Park =

Provincial park of British Columbia

- IUCN category II (national park)
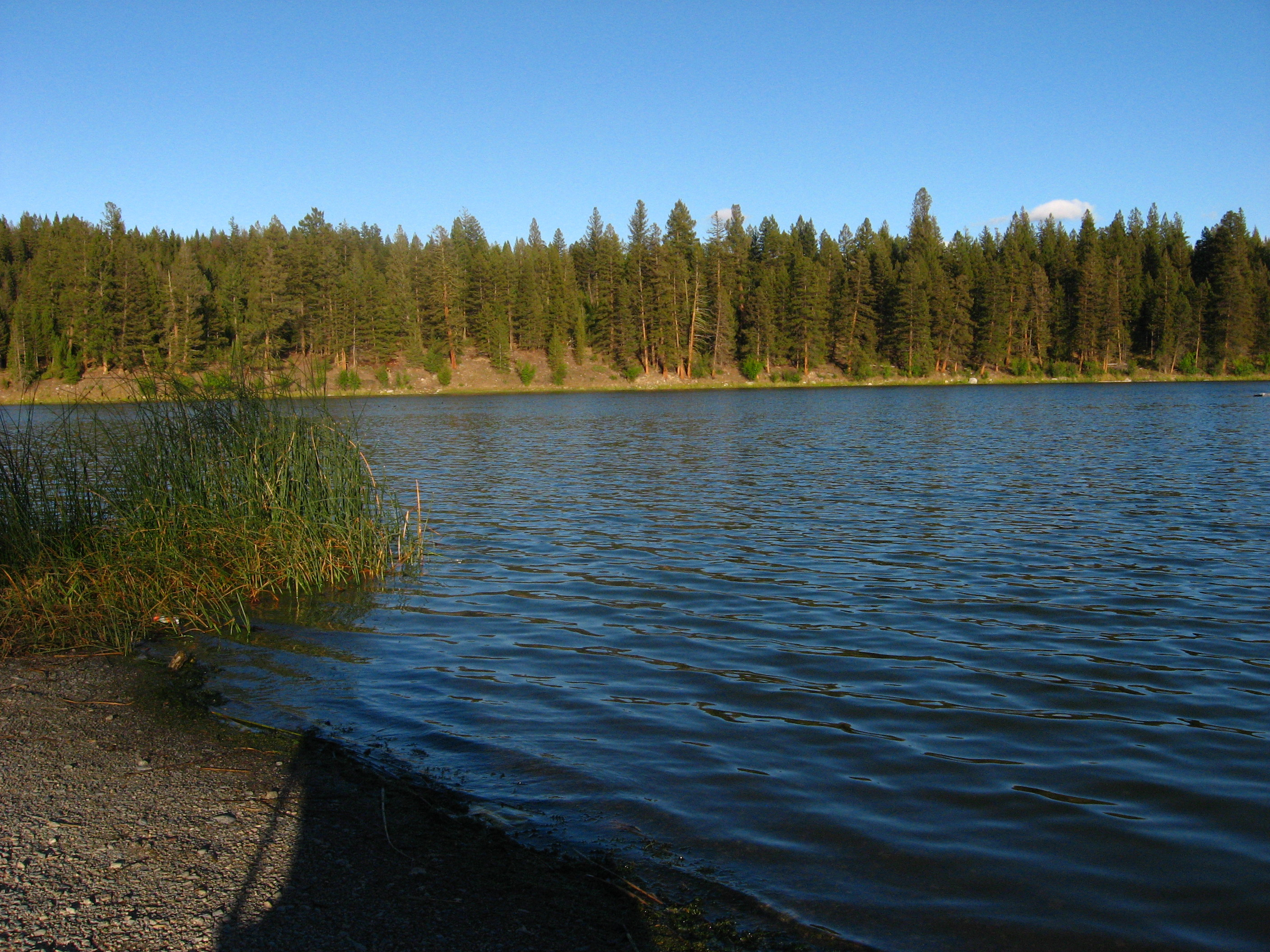
- Horseshoe Lake is one of several lakes in Roche Lake PP
- Interactive map of Roche Lake Provincial Park
- Location: British Columbia, Canada
- Nearest city: Kamloops
- Coordinates: 50°28′00″N 120°09′00″W
- Governing body: BC Parks

Roche Lake Provincial Park is a provincial park in British Columbia, Canada, located northeast of Stump Lake in the Nicola Country of that province's South-Central Interior. The park lies to the northwest of the city of Merritt and to the south of Kamloops.

== Gallery ==
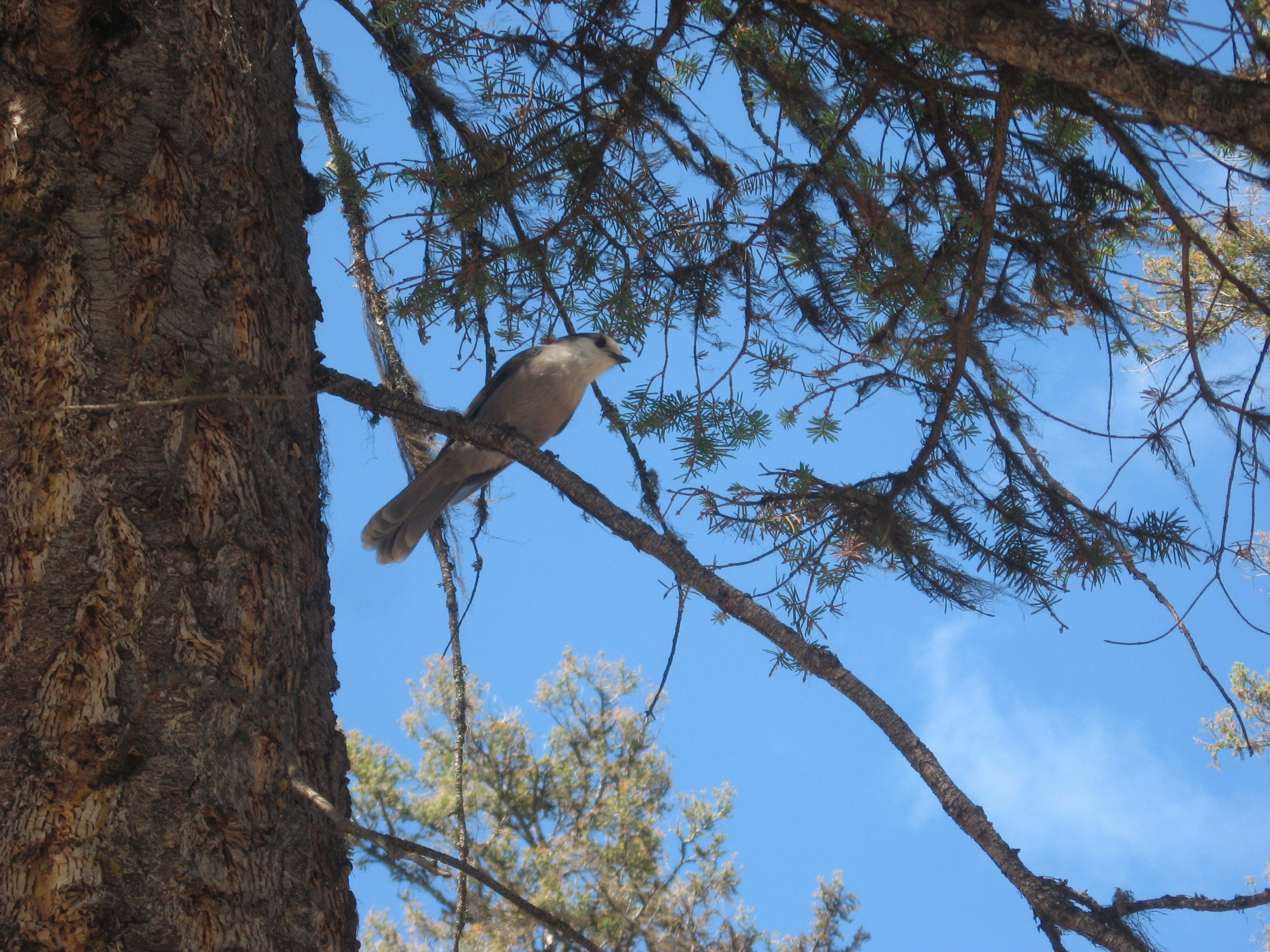
Canada jay in Roche Lake Provincial Park
