= Momich Lakes Provincial Park =

Provincial park in British Columbia, Canada

- IUCN category II (national park)
- Location within British Columbia
- Interactive map of Momich Lakes Provincial Park
- Location: British Columbia, Canada
- Nearest city: Kamloops
- Coordinates: 51°19′44″N 119°21′29″W
- Area: 16.05 km^{2} (6.20 sq mi)
- Established: April 30, 1996
- Governing body: BC Parks

Momich Lakes Provincial Park is a provincial park in British Columbia, Canada, located at the north end of Adams Lake, 100 kilometres (62 mi) northeast of Kamloops.

The park protects the most northerly occurrence of western larch in British Columbia. Sockeye salmon, trout and other fish species are present in the Momich River.
