= Eakin Creek Floodplain Provincial Park =

Provincial park in British Columbia, Canada

- IUCN category II (national park)
- Location within British Columbia
- Interactive map of Eakin Creek Floodplain Provincial Park
- Location: Kamloops Division Yale Land District, British Columbia, Canada
- Nearest city: Little Fort, BC
- Coordinates: 51°28′29″N 120°19′25″W
- Area: 126 ha (310 acres)
- Established: April 30, 1996
- Governing body: BC Parks

Eakin Creek Floodplain Provincial Park is a provincial park in British Columbia, Canada located on the North Thompson River near the community of Little Fort.

== See also ==
- Eakin Creek Canyon Provincial Park
