= Oregon Jack Provincial Park =

Provincial park in British Columbia, Canada

- IUCN category II (national park)
- Location within British Columbia
- Interactive map of Oregon Jack Provincial Park
- Location: British Columbia, Canada
- Nearest city: Ashcroft
- Coordinates: 50°37′27″N 121°29′45″W
- Area: 2.3 km^{2} (0.89 sq mi)
- Established: April 30, 1996
- Governing body: BC Parks

Oregon Jack Provincial Park is a provincial park in British Columbia, Canada located in the Clear Range west of Ashcroft. It protects the limestone canyon of Oregon Jack Creek, at the head of which is a waterfall named the Notch, above which is included a wetland area. The site was an important First Nations site and there are pictographs, culturally modified trees and a site known as the Three Sisters Rock Shelter.

== See also ==
- Blue Earth Lake Provincial Park
- Cornwall Hills Provincial Park
