= Greenstone Mountain Provincial Park =

Provincial park in Britiah Columbia

- IUCN category II (national park)
- Location within British Columbia
- Interactive map of Greenstone Mountain Provincial Park
- Location: Kamloops Division Yale Land District, British Columbia, Canada
- Nearest city: Kamloops, BC
- Coordinates: 50°36′44″N 120°38′40″W
- Area: 124 ha (310 acres)
- Established: July 23, 1997
- Governing body: BC Parks

Greenstone Mountain Provincial Park is a provincial park in British Columbia, Canada, located south of Kamloops Lake on the northern edge of the Thompson Plateau.
