= Tunkwa Provincial Park =

Provincial park in British Columbia

- IUCN category II (national park)
- Location within British Columbia
- Interactive map of Tunkwa Provincial Park
- Location: British Columbia, Canada
- Nearest city: Logan Lake
- Coordinates: 50°37′11″N 120°53′01″W
- Area: 51.38 km^{2} (19.84 sq mi)
- Established: April 30, 1996
- Governing body: BC Parks

Tunkwa Provincial Park (also known as Tunkwa Lake Park) is a provincial park located on the northern Thompson Plateau in south-central British Columbia, Canada. The locality is by road about 16 kilometres (10 mi) north of Logan Lake and 27 kilometres (17 mi) south of Savona.

Established in 1996 on the Tunkwa Lake Road, the 5,100-hectare (13,000-acre) park encompasses the man-made Tunkwa Lake and Leighton Lake. This year-round recreational area offers a variety of activities including trout fishing, horseback riding, camping, hunting, and snowmobiling. Many ATV trails surround the park. Although the park is open year-round, fully serviced campsites are available from May 1 to October 12. The Tunkwa and Leighton campgrounds hold 275 vehicle-accessible campsites.
