= High Lakes Basin Provincial Park =

Canadian provincial park

- IUCN category II (national park)
- Location within British Columbia
- Interactive map of High Lakes Basin Provincial Park
- Location: Kamloops Division Yale Land District, British Columbia, Canada
- Nearest city: Little Fort, BC
- Coordinates: 51°22′56″N 120°25′03″W
- Area: 570 ha (1,400 acres)
- Established: April 30, 1997
- Governing body: BC Parks

High Lakes Basin Provincial Park is a provincial park in British Columbia, Canada.
