= Eakin Creek Canyon Provincial Park =

Canadian provincial park

- IUCN category II (national park)
- Location within British Columbia
- Interactive map of Eakin Creek Canyon Provincial Park
- Location: Kamloops Division Yale Land District, British Columbia, Canada
- Nearest city: Little Fort, BC
- Coordinates: 51°27′05″N 120°13′37″W
- Area: 10 ha (25 acres)
- Established: April 30, 1996
- Governing body: BC Parks

Eakin Creek Canyon Provincial Park is a provincial park in British Columbia, Canada, located on the west side of the North Thompson River near the community of Little Fort. The park is approximately 10 ha. in size.

== See also ==
- Eakin Creek Floodplain Provincial Park
