= Walhachin Oxbows Provincial Park =

Provincial park in British Columbia, Canada

- IUCN category II (national park)
- Location within British Columbia
- Interactive map of Walhachin Oxbows Provincial Park
- Location: British Columbia, Canada
- Nearest city: Cache Creek
- Coordinates: 50°45′03″N 120°55′50″W
- Area: 0.37 km^{2} (0.14 sq mi)
- Established: July 23, 1997
- Governing body: BC Parks

Walhachin Oxbows Provincial Park is a provincial park in British Columbia, Canada.

== See also ==
- Walhachin, British Columbia
