= Upper Adams River Provincial Park =

Provincial park in British Columbia, Canada

- IUCN category II (national park)
- Location within British Columbia
- Interactive map of Upper Adams River Provincial Park
- Location: British Columbia, Canada
- Nearest city: Kamloops
- Coordinates: 51°37′09″N 119°12′29″W
- Area: 58.68 km^{2} (22.66 sq mi)
- Established: April 30, 1996
- Governing body: BC Parks

Upper Adams River Provincial Park is a provincial park in British Columbia, Canada.
