= Big Bar Lake Provincial Park =

Provincial park in British Columbia

- IUCN category II (national park)
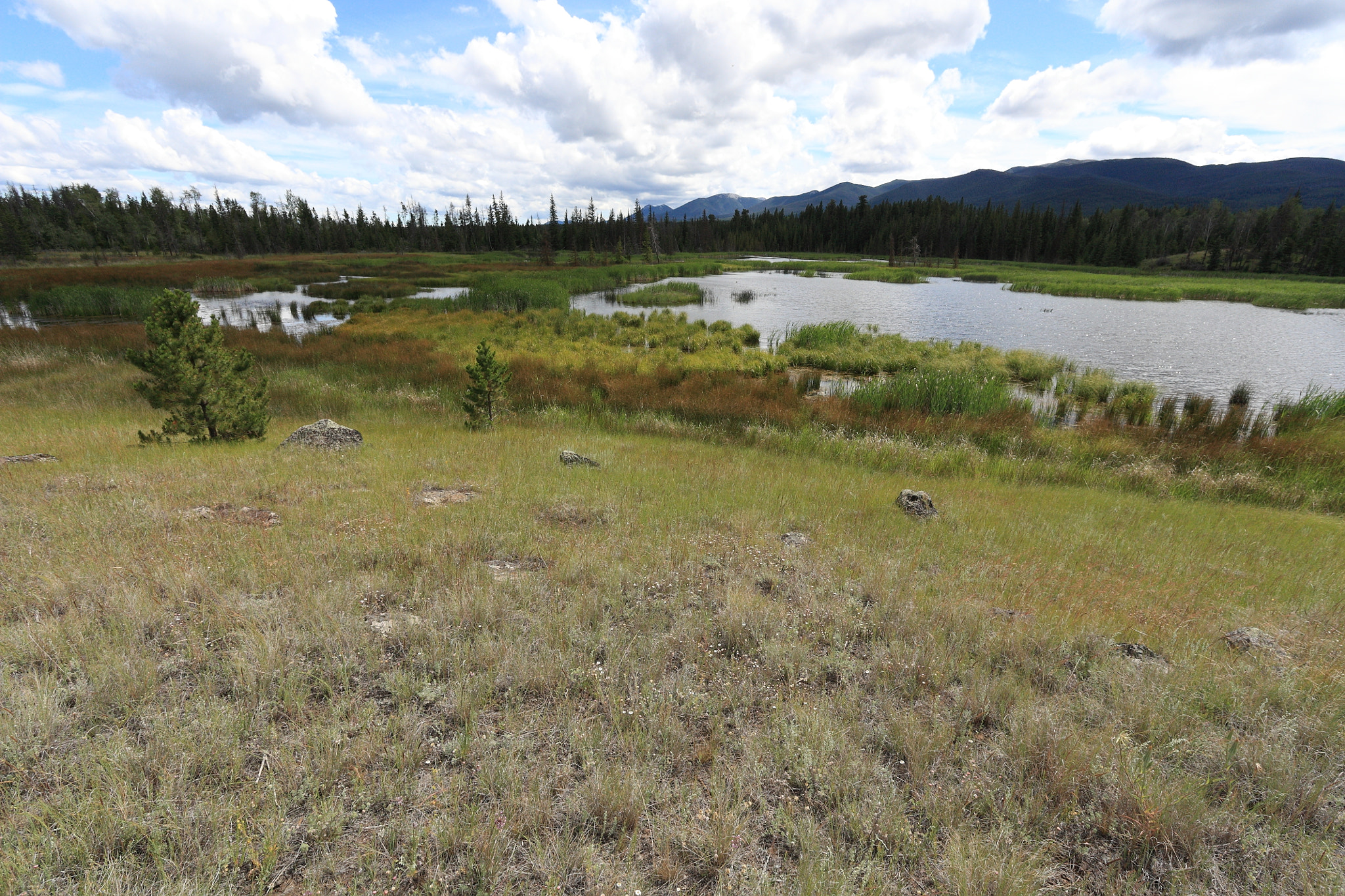
- Otter Marsh in Big Bar Lake Provincial Park

- Location within British Columbia
- Interactive map of Big Bar Lake Provincial Park
- Location: Thompson-Nicola, British Columbia, Canada
- Nearest town: Clinton
- Coordinates: 51°18′39″N 121°48′51″W
- Area: 368 ha (910 acres)
- Established: October 27, 1969
- Administrator: BC Parks

Big Bar Lake Provincial Park is a provincial park in British Columbia, Canada. It includes vehicle accessible camping, a boat launch, swimming, angling, and hiking opportunities. There are 46 campsites within the park in two very close campgrounds.
