= Blue Earth Lake Provincial Park =

Provincial park in British Columbia, Canada

- IUCN category II (national park)
- Location within British Columbia
- Interactive map of Blue Earth Lake Provincial Park
- Location: Kamloops Division Yale Land District, British Columbia, Canada
- Nearest city: Ashcroft, BC
- Coordinates: 50°35′39″N 121°30′29″W
- Area: 689 ha (1,700 acres)
- Established: April 30, 1996
- Governing body: BC Parks

Blue Earth Lake Provincial Park is a provincial park in the Upper Hat Creek area at the south end of the Cornwall Hills, just northwest of Ashcroft, British Columbia, Canada.

== See also ==
- Bedard Aspen Provincial Park
- Cornwall Hills Provincial Park
- Marble Canyon Provincial Park
- Oregon Jack Provincial Park
