= Bedard Aspen Provincial Park =

Provincial park in British Columbia

- IUCN category II (national park)
- Location within British Columbia
- Interactive map of Bedard Aspen Provincial Park
- Location: Kamloops Division Yale Land District, British Columbia, Canada
- Nearest city: Ashcroft, BC
- Coordinates: 50°39′45″N 121°30′37″W
- Area: 182 ha (450 acres)
- Established: April 30, 1996
- Governing body: BC Parks

Bedard Aspen Provincial Park is a provincial park in British Columbia, Canada, located in the Cornwall Hills to the west of Cache Creek-Ashcroft in that province's Thompson Country region. The valley of Hat Creek is to its west.

== See also ==
- Cornwall Hills Park
- Blue Earth Lake Provincial Park
