= Blue River, British Columbia =

Blue River
- Community
- Location of Blue River in British Columbia
- Coordinates: 52°06′N 119°18′W
- Country: Canada
- Province: British Columbia
- Regional district: Thompson-Nicola RD

Area (2021)
  - Land: 7.67 km^{2} (2.96 sq mi)

Population (2021)
  - Total: 175
  - Density: 22.8/km^{2} (59/sq mi)

Blue River is a small community of 175 residents at the 2021 census in British Columbia, situated on Highway 5 about halfway between Kamloops and Jasper, Alberta It is located at the confluence of the Blue and North Thompson Rivers. The local economy is supported by logging, tourism and transportation industries.

== Geography ==
Blue River lies in a wide, gravelly part of the North Thompson River valley. Its podzolic soils are strongly acidic and coarse, with abundant sand, gravel and stones. Drainage is not as rapid as would be expected from the soils' coarse texture because the subsoils tend to be cemented.

The forests and mountains around Blue River have plentiful big game such as deer, moose, black and grizzly bears, and caribou. Birds include osprey, eagles, woodpeckers and ravens. The mountain pine beetle has become the area's most significant insect.

Lodgepole pine is the most common tree at Blue River, with strong reproduction offsetting impacts from the mountain pine beetle. Other common native conifers are Douglas fir, Engelmann spruce, subalpine fir, western hemlock, and western red cedar. Among deciduous trees, the black cottonwood is largest; trembling aspen and paper birch are also prominent. Non-native trees which may be seen in Blue River include green ash, littleleaf linden, silver maple, and Norway maple. Sugar maple, burr oak, northern red oak, and butternut formerly thrived at the CNR Gardens.

=== Climate ===
Blue River has a continental climate which is subject to frequent modification by maritime air masses from the Pacific Ocean. The area is part of the world's only interior temperate rainforest that occupies parts of eastern British Columbia. Heavy and deep snow falls most winters. The most severe cold spells may send thermometer readings below −40 °C (−40 °F). Rain is frequent in other seasons. Summer days are warm or occasionally hot, with thunderstorms often spawning over the nearby mountains.

Climate data for Blue River Airport; elevation 683m
Month	Jan	Feb	Mar	Apr	May	Jun	Jul	Aug	Sep	Oct	Nov	Dec	Year
Record high humidex	8.5	11.1	18.7	27.6	32.2	42.4	39.7	38.7	34.5	25.2	15.0	8.0	42.4
Record high °C (°F)	8.6 (47.5)	11.0 (51.8)	19.4 (66.9)	28.0 (82.4)	33.0 (91.4)	40.3 (104.5)	37.5 (99.5)	37.8 (100.0)	33.6 (92.5)	25.5 (77.9)	16.1 (61.0)	10.0 (50.0)	40.3 (104.5)
Mean daily maximum °C (°F)	−3.5 (25.7)	0.4 (32.7)	6.1 (43.0)	11.9 (53.4)	17.6 (63.7)	21.1 (70.0)	24.0 (75.2)	24.2 (75.6)	18.3 (64.9)	9.2 (48.6)	0.9 (33.6)	−3.7 (25.3)	10.5 (50.9)
Daily mean °C (°F)	−7.3 (18.9)	−4.4 (24.1)	0.5 (32.9)	5.2 (41.4)	10.2 (50.4)	14.0 (57.2)	16.4 (61.5)	16.0 (60.8)	11.0 (51.8)	4.5 (40.1)	−1.9 (28.6)	−7.1 (19.2)	4.8 (40.6)
Mean daily minimum °C (°F)	−11.0 (12.2)	−9.1 (15.6)	−5.2 (22.6)	−1.6 (29.1)	2.8 (37.0)	6.9 (44.4)	8.8 (47.8)	7.7 (45.9)	3.7 (38.7)	−0.2 (31.6)	−4.6 (23.7)	−10.5 (13.1)	−1.0 (30.2)
Record low °C (°F)	−44.0 (−47.2)	−37.8 (−36.0)	−30.0 (−22.0)	−15.6 (3.9)	−6.8 (19.8)	−2.7 (27.1)	0.6 (33.1)	−3.5 (25.7)	−7.2 (19.0)	−20.0 (−4.0)	−36.9 (−34.4)	−44.8 (−48.6)	−44.8 (−48.6)
Record low wind chill	−44.2	−41.8	−33.1	−16.4	−7.4	−2.1	0.0	0.0	−5.9	−25.2	−37.8	−42.8	−44.2
Average precipitation mm (inches)	105.4 (4.15)	53.8 (2.12)	64.7 (2.55)	58.7 (2.31)	75.8 (2.98)	98.8 (3.89)	107.3 (4.22)	82.4 (3.24)	71.3 (2.81)	102.5 (4.04)	115.2 (4.54)	88.4 (3.48)	1,024.4 (40.33)
Average rainfall mm (inches)	21.3 (0.84)	17.6 (0.69)	35.8 (1.41)	52.7 (2.07)	75.6 (2.98)	98.8 (3.89)	107.3 (4.22)	82.4 (3.24)	71.3 (2.81)	94.0 (3.70)	49.5 (1.95)	13.5 (0.53)	719.7 (28.33)
Average snowfall cm (inches)	113.5 (44.7)	49.5 (19.5)	38.3 (15.1)	7.0 (2.8)	0.4 (0.2)	0.0 (0.0)	0.0 (0.0)	0.0 (0.0)	0.0 (0.0)	10.0 (3.9)	82.4 (32.4)	103.4 (40.7)	404.4 (159.2)
Average precipitation days (≥ 0.2 mm)	17.9	14.2	15.9	15.8	16.7	18.9	17.7	15.1	14.3	18.0	19.5	18.0	201.9
Average rainy days (≥ 0.2 mm)	5.0	5.4	10.3	14.5	16.7	18.9	17.7	15.1	14.3	16.9	9.5	3.4	147.7
Average snowy days (≥ 0.2 cm)	16.6	11.5	9.3	3.2	0.3	0.0	0.0	0.0	0.0	2.8	13.3	17.3	74.2
Average relative humidity (%)	84.4	75.5	60.3	47.7	43.1	47.0	46.6	46.1	53.3	69.4	85.8	85.1	62.0
Mean monthly sunshine hours	39.3	63.0	102.4	153.2	195.5	191.3	216.6	216.2	161.3	82.0	33.5	29.5	1,483.8
Percentage possible sunshine	15.3	22.6	27.9	36.8	40.2	38.3	43.1	47.6	42.3	24.8	12.6	12.1	30.3
Source 1:
Source 2:

== Transportation ==
Blue River has a railway station on the Canadian National Railway. The station is served by Via Rail's The Canadian as a request stop, with 48 hours advance notice required.

== See also ==
- Mud Lake Delta Provincial Park
