= British Columbia Highway 35 =

Highway in British Columbia, Canada

Highway 35
- North Francois Highway
- Highway 35 highlighted in red

Route information
- Maintained by the Ministry of Transportation and Infrastructure
- Length: 23.34 km (14.50 mi)
- Existed: 1973–present

Major junctions
- North end: Highway 16 (TCH) in Burns Lake
- South end: François Lake ferry

Location
- Country: Canada
- Province: British Columbia

Highway system
- British Columbia provincial highways
← Highway 33	→ Highway 37

Highway 35, the North Francois Highway, is a 23 km (14 mi) long minor spur of the Yellowhead Highway in the Regional District of Bulkley-Nechako. First opened in 1973, Highway 35 provides a connection from the Yellowhead at the community of Burns Lake, south to François Lake, where a ferry connects the highway to the hamlet of Southbank.

== Major intersections ==
From north to south. The entire route is in Bulkley-Nechako Regional District.

Location	km	mi	Destinations	Notes
Burns Lake	0.00	0.00	Highway 16 (TCH/YH) – Vanderhoof, Prince George, Smithers, Prince Rupert	Highway 35 northern terminus
François Lake	23.34	14.50	François Lake Ferry crosses François Lake	
François Lake	23.34	14.50	Keefe's Landing Road (Highway 910:1112 south) – Nechako Reservoir	Highway 35 southern terminus; continuation from François Lake ferry
1.000 mi = 1.609 km; 1.000 km = 0.621 mi
