= School District 91 Nechako Lakes =

Public school district in British Columbia, Canada

Location
- Vanderhoof Nechako - Bulkley Valley Canada

District information
- Superintendent: Karla Mitchell
- Asst. superintendent(s): Mike Skinner
- Schools: 18
- Budget: CA$45.3 million

Students and staff
- Students: 3,500

Other information
- Website: www.sd91.bc.ca

School District 91 Nechako Lakes is a school district in British Columbia. It covers the area northwest of Prince George along Highway 16 This includes the major communities of Fort St. James, Vanderhoof, Burns Lake, and Fraser Lake.

== History ==
School District 91 was formed in 1996 by the merging of School District No. 55 (Burns Lake) and School District No. 56 (Nechako). School District 91 serves the communities of Fort St James, Vanderhoof, Fort Fraser, Fraser Lake, Burns Lake, Grassy Plains, Decker Lake, and Granisle. In addition they work with 13 First Nation communities that have traditional lands within their geographic area.

== Schools ==
School	Location	Grades	Principal	Vice-Principal(s)
Babine Elem-Secondary School	Granisle	K–12	Jesse Kennedy-Burgoyne	
Continuing Ed SD 91	Vanderhoof	8–12	Brian Cross	
David Hoy Elementary School	Fort St James	K–7	Suzanne Burck	Kim Repko
Decker Lake Elementary School	Decker Lake	K–7	Eleanor Giesbrecht	
Evelyn Dickson Elementary School	Vanderhoof	K–6	Barb Ziler	
Fort St. James Alternate Secondary	Fort St. James	8–12	Craig Houghton	
Fort St James Secondary School	Fort St James	8–12	Craig Houghton	Shelley Leatherdale
Francois Lake Elementary School	Francois Lake	K–7	Wendy Kelemen & Ginger Moyah	Marlee Wilson
Fraser Lake Elem-Secondary School	Fraser Lake	4–12	Jason Kadonaga	Mike LeDuc
Grassy Plains School	Grassy Plains	K–12	Ginger Moyah	
Lakes District Secondary School	Burns Lake	8–12	Cheryl Peterson	Steven Little
Lakes Learning Center	Burns Lake	10–12	Cheryl Peterson	
Mapes Elementary School	Vanderhoof	K–6	Candace Lawrence	
Mouse Mountain Elementary School	Fraser Lake	K–3	Roberta Toth	
EBUS Academy	Vanderhoof	K–12	Brian Cross	Tyler Clark
Nechako Valley Secondary School	Vanderhoof	7–12	Ken Young	Travis Himmelright and Stacy Soffel
Sinkut View Elementary School	Vanderhoof	K–6	Mia Moutray (Acting Principal)	
Valhalla High School	Vanderhoof	9-12	Ken Young	
W L Mcleod Elementary School	Vanderhoof	K–6, plus French Immersion K-6	Libby Hart	Erin Baker
William Konkin Elementary School	Burns Lake	K–7	Marlee Wilson	Vaishaki Arora

- Fraser Lake Elementary-Secondary School is a unique 4–12 school. It has an enrollment of about 300 students, and services the communities of Fort Fraser, Nautley, Fraser Lake, Stellaten and Endako.

== See also ==
- List of school districts in British Columbia
