= British Columbia Highway 16 =

Highway in British Columbia

Highway 16
- Yellowhead Highway; Trans-Canada Highway
- Highway 16 highlighted in red.

Route information
- Maintained by the Ministry of Transportation and Infrastructure
- Length: 1,173 km (729 mi)
- Existed: 1941–present

Haida Gwaii segment
- Length: 101 km (63 mi)
- North end: Masset
- South end: BC Ferries dock in Skidegate

Mainland segment
- Length: 1,072 km (666 mi)
- West end: BC Ferries dock in Prince Rupert
- Major intersections: Highway 113 in Terrace; Highway 37 south in Terrace; Highway 37 north in Kitwanga; Highway 118 in Topley; Highway 35 in Burns Lake; Highway 27 near Vanderhoof; Highway 97 in Prince George; Highway 5 (YH) near Tête Jaune Cache
- East end: Highway 16 (TCH) at the Alberta border

Location
- Country: Canada
- Province: British Columbia

Highway system
- British Columbia provincial highways
← Highway 15	→ Highway 17

Highway 16 is a highway in British Columbia, Canada. It is British Columbia's important section of the Yellowhead Highway, a part of the Trans-Canada Highway that runs across Western Canada, from British Columbia's Graham Island east to Winnipeg, Manitoba, via Edmonton, Alberta, and Saskatoon, Saskatchewan. The highway closely follows the path of the northern B.C. alignment of the Canadian National Railway (CN). The number "16" was first given to the highway in 1941, and originally, the route that the highway took was more to the north of today's highway, and it was not as long as it is now. Highway 16 originally ran from New Hazelton east to Aleza Lake. In 1948, Highway 16's western end was moved from New Hazelton to the coastal city of Prince Rupert, and in 1953, the highway was re-aligned to end at Prince George. In 1969, further alignment east into Yellowhead Pass was opened to traffic after being constructed up through 1968 and raised to all-weather standards in 1969. Highway 16's alignment on Haida Gwaii was commissioned in 1983 and is connected to the mainland segment via BC Ferries route No. 11.

A series of murders and disappearances has given the stretch between Prince Rupert and Prince George the name "Highway of Tears".

== Route description ==
=== Haida Gwaii section ===
The 101-kilometre (63 mi) segment of the 1,347-kilometre-long (837 mi) BC highway begins in the west in the village of Masset, on the northern coast of Graham Island, marking the western terminus of the Yellowhead Highway. Proceeding south, the highway goes 38 kilometres (24 mi) to the inlet town of Port Clements. Winding its way along the boundary of Naikoon Provincial Park, Highway 16 goes south for 27 kilometres (17 mi) before reaching the community of Tlell. 36 kilometres (22 mi) south of Tlell, Highway 16 reaches Skidegate, where its Haida Gwaii section terminates at a ferry terminal.

=== Mainland section ===
BC Ferries then takes Highway 16 across the Hecate Strait for 92.9 nautical miles (172.1 km; 106.9 mi) due northeast to its landing at Prince Rupert.

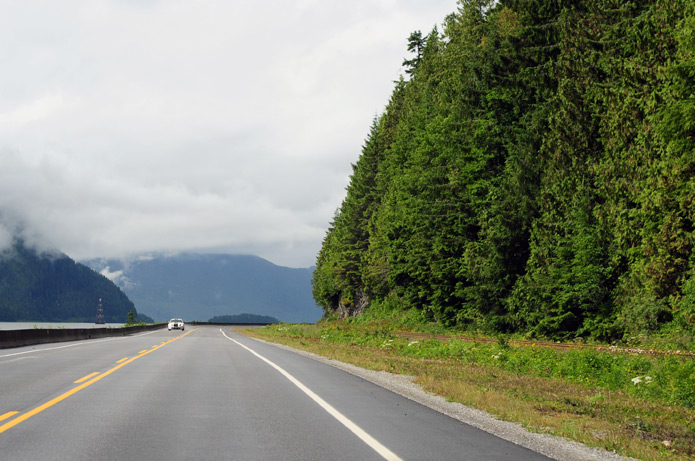
Highway 16 heading west towards Prince Rupert from Terrace

From Prince Rupert, Highway 16 begins its winding route east through the Coast Mountain Ranges. Following the Skeena River, the highway travels for 151 kilometres (94 mi) to the city of Terrace. Highway 37 merges onto Highway 16 from north of Highway 16, at the Kitwanga junction. Another 43 kilometres (27 mi) northeast, Highway 16 reaches New Hazelton, where it then veers southeast along the Bulkley River. 68 kilometres (42 mi) later, the highway reaches the town of Smithers, proceeding southeast another 64 kilometres (40 mi) to the village of Houston.

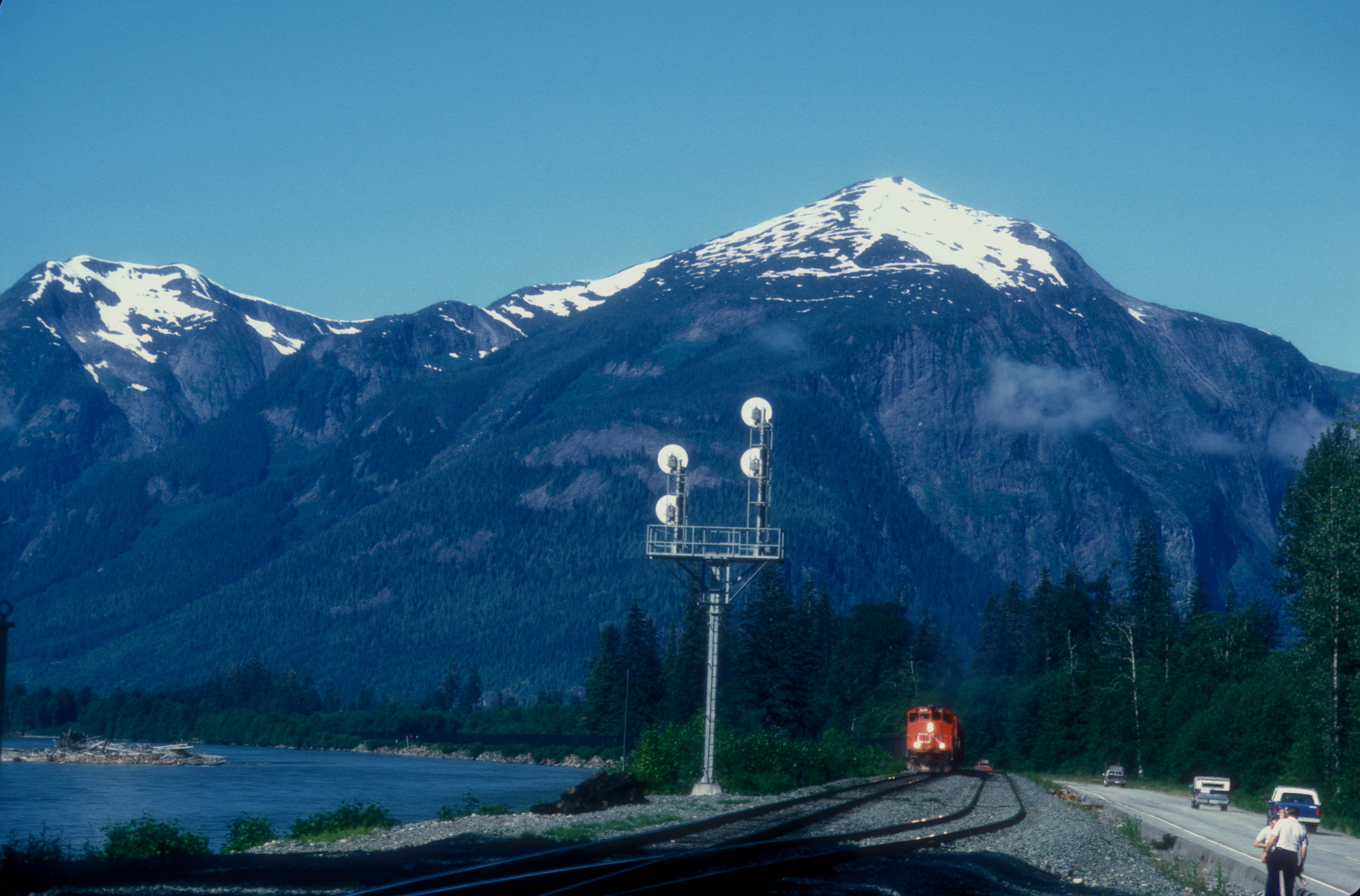
Along the Skeena River, near Kitwanga

At Houston, Highway 16 begins a parallel course along the upper course of the Bulkley River, proceeding 81 kilometres (50 mi) east to its junction with Highway 35, south of Burns Lake. 128 kilometres (80 mi) east, after passing through the hamlet of Fraser Lake, Highway 16 reaches its junction with Highway 27 in the town of Vanderhoof. 97 kilometres (60 mi) east of Vanderhoof, Highway 16 reaches its B.C. midpoint as it enters the city of Prince George at its junction with Highway 97. Highway 16 leaves Prince George after coursing through the city for 9 kilometres (5.6 mi).

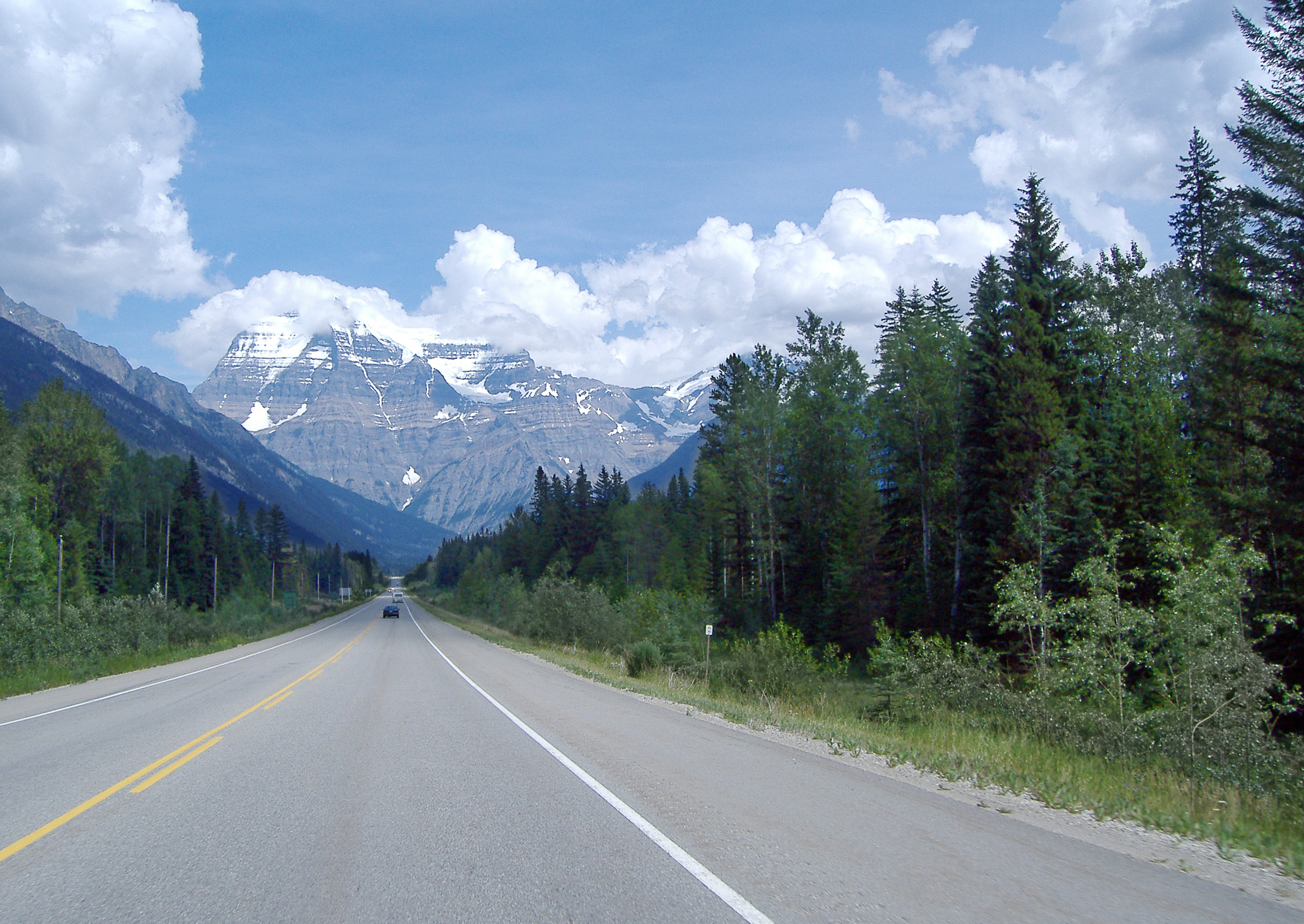
Passing through Mt. Robson Provincial Park.

120 kilometres (75 mi) east of Prince George, Highway 16 reaches the community of Dome Creek, where it converges with the Fraser River and turns southeast. It follows the Fraser River upstream for 82 kilometres (51 mi) to McBride, then continues upstream for another 64 kilometres (40 mi) to its junction with Highway 5 at Tête Jaune Cache. 14 kilometres (8.7 mi) east of Tête Jaune Cache, Highway 16 enters Mount Robson Provincial Park, coursing through the park for 63 kilometres (39 mi) to the boundary between British Columbia and Alberta (and also between Mount Robson Provincial Park and Jasper National Park) within Yellowhead Pass.

== Construction and upgrading ==
=== Prince George–New Hazelton ===
In August 1925, this section opened with the completion of the Burns Lake–Endako link.

=== New Hazelton–Kitwanga ===
Highway 16 was extended west of New Hazelton by about 6 kilometres (4 mi) in 1927–28 and another 5.3 kilometres (3.3 mi) in 1928–29. By 1931–32, Kitwanga–Hazelton was rated fairly good. By mid-1943, the condition was rated rough, awaiting tendering of reconstruction contracts.

=== Kitwanga–Usk ===
By 1931–32, Cedarvale–Kitwanga was rated passable. For Usk–Cedarvale, several segments were under construction. During 1936–1941, a series of 2-to-6-kilometre (1 to 4 mi) stretches were completed, which included replacing sections washed out by the 1936 flood. By 1937, the Usk–Cedarvale gap still remained on the southeast shore.

By 1940, a 32-kilometre (20 mi) gap remained. In 1943, progress reactivated. In May 1944, the gap completed comprised the Pacific–Cedarvale section.

=== Usk–Terrace ===
Highway 16 was extended east of Terrace by about 3 kilometres (2 mi) in 1927–28 and another 6.0 kilometres (3.7 mi) in 1928–29. In September 1929, Terrace–Usk section completed.

=== Terrace–Prince Rupert ===
- 1927: Aerial reconnaissance to identify possible routes was unsuccessful.
- 1928: Galloway Rapids–Phelan, about 8 kilometres (5 mi) cleared. Phelan station was about 3.6 kilometres (2 mi) south of present Port Edward.
- 1930: Galloway Rapids bridge built. Over prior few years, a narrow, winding, gravel road had been cut from the Prince Rupert city limits. A road east from the bridge began.
- Early 1930s: Great Depression relief crews extended road eastward.
- 1935: Completed about 4 kilometres (2 mi) eastward to Kloiya Bay. Preliminary decision made to progress a highway eastward rather than via Port Edward and south along the shoreline. Within a few years, a narrow, rough road followed the shores of Taylor and Pudhomme lakes.
- 1938: Option of a route via present Kitimat was rejected.
- 1942: US entry into World War II prompted the building of a highway to move troops in response to a potential Japanese invasion. That year, construction contracts were awarded. Significant parts of the CN right-of-way were appropriated for the highway and the track realigned. A total of 45 bridges would be prefabricated.
- 1943: Working 24/7, progress hampered by high employee turnover owing to cold and wet summer weather. That February, five snowslides buried a construction camp near Kwinitsa, killing two and injuring 11.
- 1944: "Skeena Highway" officially opened in September. However, the road in many places was a narrow winding trail hugging the railway tracks. With the Japanese invasion threat long passed, the road was not snowplowed that winter.
- 1945: Route no longer possessed military value. The federal government initially maintained control because the province did not want to assume maintenance costs.
- 1946: Province took over the highway.
- 1951: Highway was paved. The following winter was the first time snowplowing was used to keep the highway open.
- 1970: Highway rerouted and repaved.
- 1972: January and February brought the heaviest snowfalls and longest road closures.
- 1974: January snowslide about 45 kilometres (28 mi) west of Terrace buried motel/restaurant/gas station complex, killing seven people.
- Late 1960s: Prince Rupert–Tyee reconstruction.
- 1980s: Kasiks, Tyee, and Esker railway overpasses erected.
- 1989: Falling ice at Car Wash Rock, about 7.5 kilometres (4.7 mi) east of Exchamsiks River Provincial Park, killed a motorist.
- Early 1990s: Hazardous Tyee–Khyex section realigned.
- 2020s: Despite promises to rectify, the Car Wash Rock site remains hazardous. About 3.5 kilometres (2.2 mi) farther east, the Mile 28 project to replace the railway crossing with an overpass has stalled.

== Highway of Tears ==
The Highway of Tears is a stretch of Highway 16 between Prince George and Prince Rupert. Since 1970, numerous women have gone missing or have been murdered along the 720-kilometre (450 mi) section of highway. Aboriginal organizations speculate that number ranges above forty.

In 2016, the Canadian government launched the National Inquiry into Missing and Murdered Indigenous Women after communicating with victim families. This was done to find methods of slowing the violence within the Indigenous population.

In September 2020 a totem pole honouring missing and murdered Indigenous women was raised on the highway just outside Terrace.

== Major intersections ==
From west to east, the following intersections are observed along Highway 16. Distances exclude the 92.9-nautical-mile (172.1 km; 106.9 mi) ferry route of BC Ferries between Skidegate and Prince Rupert.

Regional District	Location	km	mi	Destinations	Notes
North Coast	Masset	0.00	0.00	Hodges Avenue / Towhill Road	Western terminus of the Yellowhead Highway
North Coast	Skidegate	100.90	62.70	Oceanview Drive (Highway 911:1512 west) – Daajing Giids	Daajing Giids was formerly known as Queen Charlotte prior to July 13, 2022.
North Coast	Skidegate	101.19	62.88	Skidegate Ferry Terminal	
Hecate Strait				BC Ferries from Skidegate to Prince Rupert	
North Coast	Prince Rupert	0.00	0.00	Prince Rupert Ferry Terminal	
North Coast	Prince Rupert	15.18	9.43	Galloway Rapids Bridge from Kaien Island to the mainland	
North Coast		15.36	9.54	Port Edward Road (Highway 911:1509 south) – Port Edward	
Kitimat–Stikine	Terrace	145.91	90.66	Highway 113 north (Nisga'a Highway) – Nisga'a Nation	
Kitimat–Stikine	Terrace	149.31– 150.26	92.78– 93.37	Dudley Little West Bridge and Dudley Little Main Bridge crosses the Skeena River	
Kitimat–Stikine	Terrace	150.50	93.52	Highway 37 south – Kitimat	West end of Highway 37 concurrency; formerly Highway 25
Kitimat–Stikine	Kitwanga	241.10	149.81	Highway 37 north (Stewart-Cassiar Highway) – Stewart, Watson Lake	East end of Highway 37 concurrency
Kitimat–Stikine	New Hazelton	284.17	176.58	Churchill Street (Highway 62 west) – Hazelton	Highway 62 is unofficial and unsigned
Bulkley-Nechako	Smithers	349.34– 354.39	217.07– 220.21	Passes through Smithers	
Bulkley-Nechako	Telkwa	366.39	227.66	Passes through Telkwa	
Bulkley-Nechako	Houston	414.19	257.37	Passes through Houston	
Bulkley-Nechako	Topley	445.08	276.56	Highway 118 north – Granisle	
Bulkley-Nechako	Burns Lake	496.39	308.44	Highway 35 south – Francois Lake	
Bulkley-Nechako	Fraser Lake	565.47	351.37	Passes through Fraser Lake	
Bulkley-Nechako		616.66	383.17	Highway 27 north – Fort St. James	
Bulkley-Nechako	Vanderhoof	619.87– 624.72	385.17– 388.18	Passes through Vanderhoof	
Fraser-Fort George	Prince George	712.79	442.91	Blackwater Road (Highway 907:1558 south) / Sykes Road	
Fraser-Fort George	Prince George	716.66	445.31	Southridge Avenue	Interchange; no westbound entrance
Fraser-Fort George	Prince George	720.55	447.73	Highway 97 (Cariboo Highway) – Dawson Creek, Quesnel, Kamloops, Vancouver	
Fraser-Fort George	Prince George	722.03	448.65	Victoria Street / 20th Avenue	Highway 16 turns onto Victoria Street
Fraser-Fort George	Prince George	723.74	449.71	1st Avenue	Former Highway 97A north; Highway 16 turns onto 1st Avenue
Fraser-Fort George	Prince George	725.70	450.93	Yellowhead Bridge over the Fraser River	
Fraser-Fort George	Prince George	729.86	453.51	Old Cariboo Highway south to Highway 97 – Airport, Quesnel	Former Highway 97A south; to Highway 909:1156
Fraser-Fort George		742.31	461.25	Upper Fraser Road (Highway 909:1578 east) – Willow River, Giscome, Upper Fraser	
Fraser-Fort George	McBride	933.97	580.34	McBride Bridge over the Fraser River	
Fraser-Fort George	Tête Jaune Cache	995.60	618.64	Highway 5 (YH) south – Valemount, Kamloops	Tête Jaune Interchange
Fraser-Fort George	Mount Robson Provincial Park	1,009.70	627.40	West end of Mount Robson Provincial Park	
Fraser-Fort George	Mount Robson Provincial Park	1,072.37	666.34	Yellowhead Pass (Continental Divide) – 1,131 m (3,711 ft)	
Fraser-Fort George	Mount Robson Provincial Park	1,072.37	666.34	Highway 16 (TCH/YH) east – Jasper, Edmonton	Continuation into Alberta and Jasper National Park
1.000 mi = 1.609 km; 1.000 km = 0.621 mi: Concurrency terminus; Incomplete access; Tolled

Yellowhead Highway
Previous route Terminus	Highway 16	Next route AB Highway 16
Trans-Canada Highway
Previous route Terminus	Highway 16	Next route AB Highway 16
