= British Columbia Highway 118 =

Highway in British Columbia

Highway 118
- Central Babine Lake Highway; Topley Landing Road

Route information
- Maintained by the Ministry of Transportation and Infrastructure
- Length: 49 km (30 mi)
- Existed: 2003–present

Major junctions
- South end: Highway 16 (TCH) near Topley
- North end: Granisle

Location
- Country: Canada
- Province: British Columbia

Highway system
- British Columbia provincial highways
← Highway 113	→ Highway 395

British Columbia Highway 118, also known as the Central Babine Lake Highway and signed as Topley Landing Road, is a 50 km (31 mi) long minor spur of the Yellowhead Highway in the Regional District of Bulkley-Nechako.

Signed as such in 2003, Highway 118 is the highest numbered highway in the province not derived from the continuation of a US highway. The lightly used highway provides a connection from the Yellowhead at the community of Topley north to the village of Granisle.

== Major intersections ==
The entire route is in Bulkley-Nechako Regional District.

Location	km	mi	Destinations	Notes
Topley	0.00	0.00	Highway 16 (TCH/YH) – Prince George, Prince Rupert	Southern terminus; road continues as Sunset Lake Road
Granisle	48.86	30.36	Granisle Marina main entrance	Northern terminus
1.000 mi = 1.609 km; 1.000 km = 0.621 mi

== See also ==
- Topley Landing
