= Buck Creek basin =

The Buck Creek basin is a structural basin on the Nechako Plateau in the central Interior of British Columbia, Canada, located north of François Lake between the towns of Houston and Burns Lake. It consists of a faulted depression 60 km (37 mi) wide and 80 km (50 mi) long, with its base lying 1,000 m (3,300 ft) to 3,000 m (9,800 ft) below its rim and the surrounding hills, which are composed of metamorphic rocks.

The structure of the Buck Creek basin is rift-related, controlled by a series of northwest–southwest trending strike-slip faults. These faults are related to a period of rifting that trended to the southwest when the Nachako Plateau area was tectonically active during the Late Cretaceous, Eocene and Early Oligocene periods. The Buck Creek basin is filled with a series of volcanic, pyroclastic and sedimentary rocks that range in age from the Cretaceous period to the Paleogene period.

== See also ==
- Francois Lake Group
