= Francois Lake Group =

The Francois Lake Group is a stratigraphical unit of the Nechako Plateau in the central Interior of British Columbia, Canada. It takes its name from Francois Lake 30 km (19 mi) south of Burns Lake and 10 km (6.2 mi) west of Fraser Lake. It consists of continental volcanic and sedimentary rocks that form a thickness of 1,500 m (4,900 ft).

== See also ==
- Buck Creek basin
