= British Columbia Highway 27 =

Highway in British Columbia

Highway 27
- Stuart Lake Highway

Route information
- Maintained by the Ministry of Transportation and Infrastructure
- Length: 61.14 km (37.99 mi)
- Existed: 1967–present

Major junctions
- South end: Highway 16 (TCH) near Vanderhoof
- North end: Tachie Road / Takla Road near Fort St. James

Location
- Country: Canada
- Province: British Columbia

Highway system
- British Columbia provincial highways
← Highway 26	→ Highway 28

Highway 27, the Stuart Lake Highway, is a 61 km-long (38 mi) spur of the Yellowhead Highway in the Regional District of Bulkley-Nechako. First opened in 1967, it provides a connection from Vanderhoof, on Highway 16, north to Fort St. James, at the southern end of Stuart Lake. Highway 27 is a two lane roadway maintained year round by third party contractors overseen by the British Columbia Ministry of Transportation and Infrastructure. Wildlife such as moose and deer pose a frequent hazard to motorists along the route.

== Major intersections ==
The entire route is in Bulkley-Nechako Regional District.

Location	km	mi	Destinations	Notes
	0.00	0.00	Highway 16 (TCH/YH) – Vanderhoof, Prince Rupert, Prince George	Southern terminus
	4.06	2.52	Crosses the Nechako River	
	7.22	4.49	Braeside Road (Highway 909:1562 west) / Northside Road	
Fort St. James	61.14	37.99	Tachie Road / Takla Road – Leo Creek, Tachie Germansen Landing Road – Germansen Landing	Northern terminus; continues as Germansen Landing Road
1.000 mi = 1.609 km; 1.000 km = 0.621 mi
