= Vanderhoof Aquatic Centre =

Indoor aquatic centre in Vanderhoof, British Columbia

Coordinates: 54.016374°N 123.9995211°W

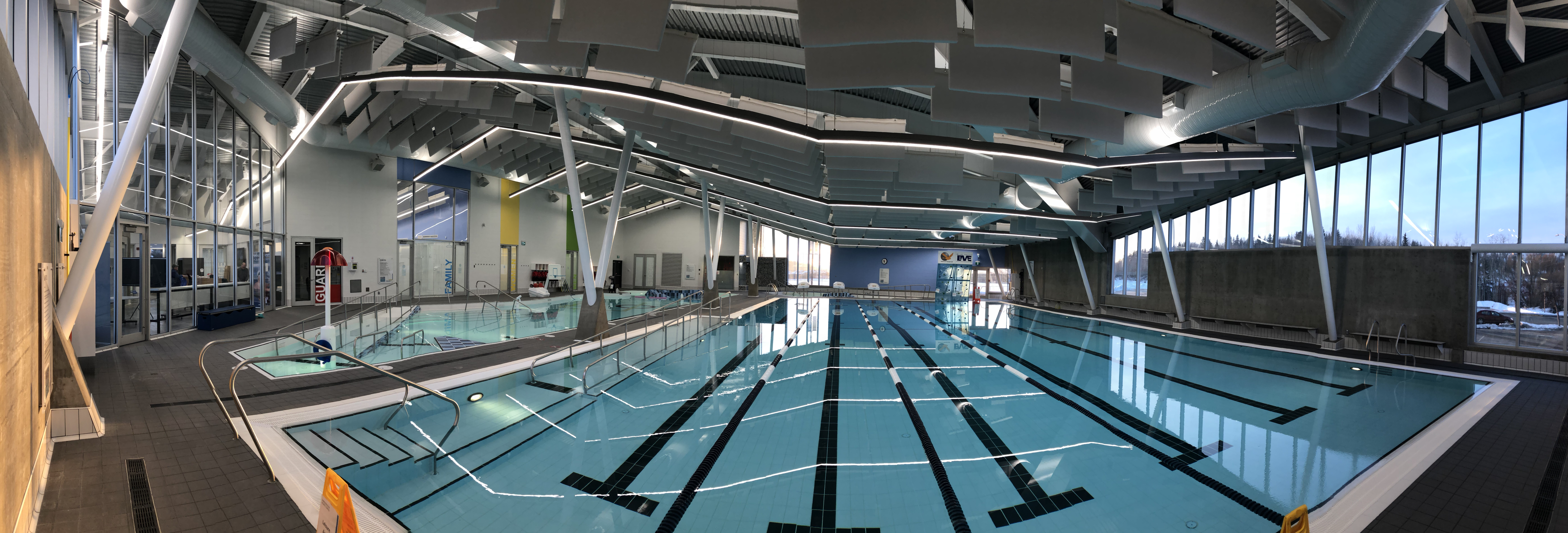
- Interactive map of Vanderhoof Aquatic Centre
- Location: 390 Columbia Street East, Vanderhoof, BC, V0J 3A0
- Owner: Vanderhoof, British Columbia
- Operator: YMCA of Northern BC
- Dimensions: Length: 50 metres (164 ft); Width: 20 metres (66 ft); Depth: 2.40 metres (8 ft)

Construction
- Opened: January 26, 2019
- Construction cost: $12 million
- Architect: Carscadden Stokes McDonald Architects Inc.

Website
- nbc.ymca.ca

The Vanderhoof Aquatic Centre is an indoor aquatic centre in Vanderhoof, British Columbia. The building was designed by Carscadden Stokes McDonald Architects Inc., built at a cost of $12 million and opened in January 2019. The facility features a six-lane 25-meter lap pool, 1,500 sq ft leisure pool and 35 person hot tub. The facility is owned by the District of Vanderhoof and operated by the YMCA of Northern BC.

== Funding ==
The District of Vanderhoof applied for and successfully received $6 million from the federal government and $1.4 million from the federal gas tax fund. Vanderhoof additionally received a municipal loan of $3 million and also received a donation of $1 million from Vanderhoof Community Forest. Community crowdfunding and fundraisers raised an additional $300,000.
