= Binta Lake Fire =

2010 wildfire

- Location: British Columbia, Canada

Statistics
- Burned area: 99,000 acres (40,000 ha)

Ignition
- Cause: Lightning strikes, spread by gusty winds and dry conditions

Binta Lake Fire was a lightning-caused wildfire in Southeast of Burns Lake, British Columbia that started on Wednesday, July 28, 2010, and lasted for more than a month. It was the largest fire in the province in 2010. The fire burned a total area of 400 square kilometers (99,000 acres). The fire caused thick smoke in surrounding areas, evacuation orders in the region, and damaged merchantable timber.

== Origin ==
The fire was caused by lightning that was fueled by dry conditions and gusty winds, blowing at a speed of 46 kilometers per hour.

== Description ==
The fire started 46 kilometers Southeast of Burns Lake. It was one of the 79 fires in the Nadina Fire Zone. In 12 hours, the fire grew from 7,000 hectares to 35,000 hectares. It spread 17.5 km overnight. In one day, the blaze tripled in size. By August 16, 51 firefighters had been deployed to suppress the blazing fire as it had. The number of firefighters was increased to 284 along with 96 pieces of heavy equipment. The thick smoke reduced visibility due to which helicopters could not be deployed.

It was affecting Francois Lake and Fraser Lake. 32 homes were evacuated and 335 homes were on evacuation alert. The fire combined with Llgitiyuz Lake fire and the Prince George Fire Centre fire. The fire was 20% contained by August 22. The fire lasted for more than a month and burned a total area of 99,000 acres, out of which 17,000 acres belonged to the Cheslatta community forest.

== Consequences ==
The fire burned 9700 hectares of the Timber Harvesting Landbase (THLB) in the Lakes Timber Supply Area (TSA). 1.3 million cubic meters of harvestable timber was lost.
