= Smithers Secondary School =

Smithers Secondary
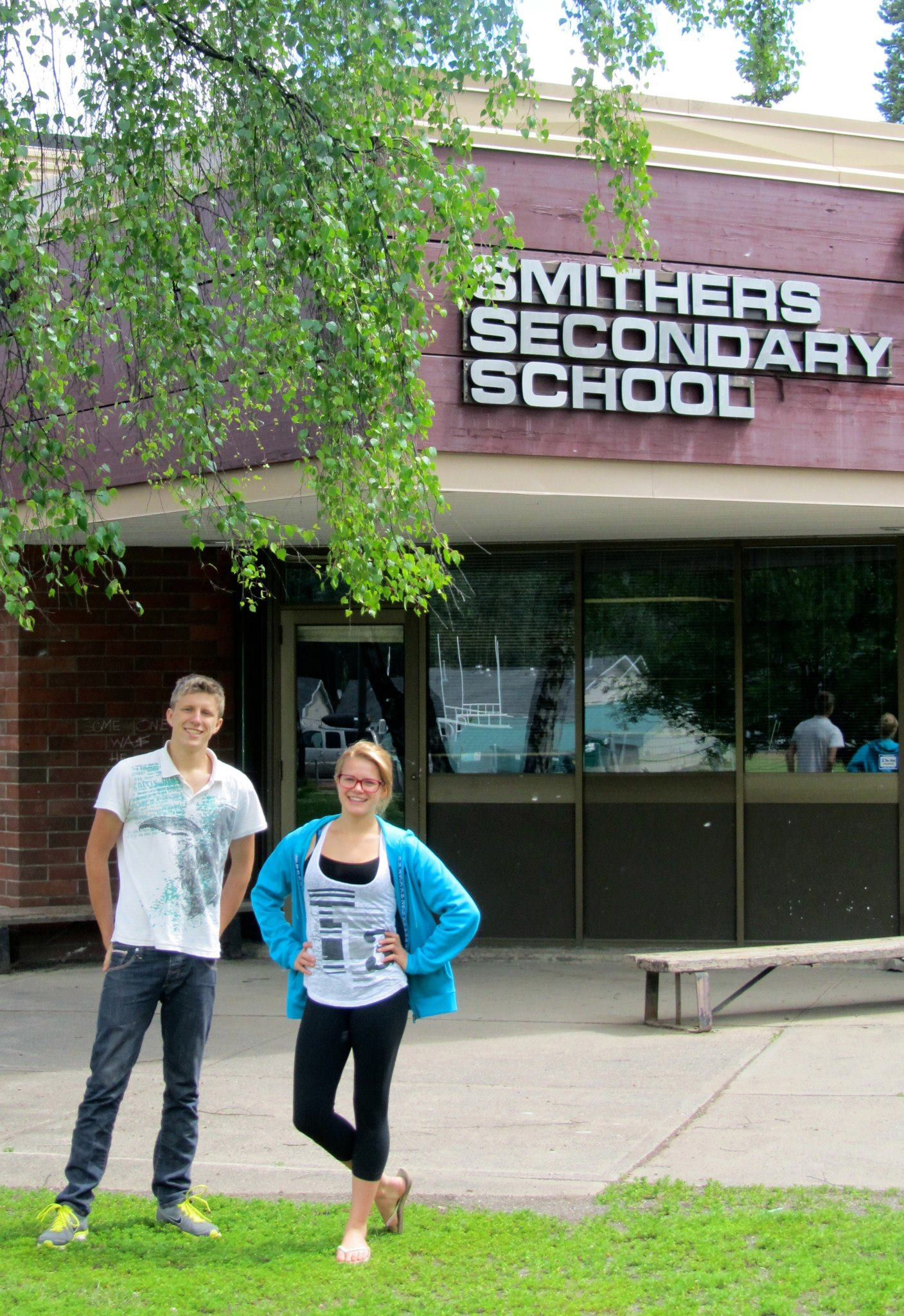

Location
- PO Box 849, 4408 3rd Avenue; Smithers, British Columbia, V0J 2N0; Canada
- Coordinates: 54.7898°N 127.1805°W

Information
- School type: Public, high school
- School board: School District 54 Bulkley Valley
- School number: 5454013
- Principal: Julie Krall
- Staff: 69 Including Administration, Student Support Services, Teaching Staff, BVEC, Support Staff, Clerical Staff and Custodial Staff
- Grades: 8–12
- Enrollment: 600 (2023/24 School year)
- Language: English
- Colours: Blue and white
- Mascot: Gryphon
- Team name: Gryphons
- Website: https://sss.sd54.bc.ca/

Smithers Secondary or SSS is a public high school in Smithers, British Columbia, part of School District 54 Bulkley Valley.

== History ==
The first high school students in Smithers attended classes in the Old Scott Hall. The first one room high school was located where Muheim Memorial Elementary school now stands. Then, in 1927, a two-room school house was built which accommodated approximately 60 students. As the population of Smithers steadily grew, so did the number of students. Starting in 1963, students in the junior grades were gradually moved from Smithers Secondary to Chandler Park Junior Secondary School. In 1978 Smithers Senior Secondary School was built at 4408 3rd Ave. It enrolled 400 students in Grades 10-12 and was staffed by 23 full-time and 4 part-time teachers. In 1981, the Grade Nine students were once again moved from Chandler Park to SSS. Commencing in the Fall of 1988, construction began on an expansive addition to S.S.S., which included a theatre, with the new wing and theatre opening in September 1989.

In 2004 "Chandler Park Middle School" closed down and Smithers Senior Secondary School became Smithers Secondary School accommodating Grades 8–12. Increasing enrolment since that time has required the School District to put up 8 portables.

== Current ==
In the 2020–21 school year, SSS has approximately 600 students, 60 teaching staff and 30 support staff. It has traditionally done well in several areas such as track & field, music, and wrestling, often producing provincial and national champions. The girls' wrestling team placed first at provincials in 2011.

== Theatre ==
The "Della Herman Theatre" is housed inside Smithers Secondary School and hosts theatrical, musical and dance events throughout the year. It is also the classroom for the Theatre Department in SSS so the students have hands on experience with the stage and sets.

== Athletics ==
The Smithers Secondary School athletic teams go by the name "SSS Gryphons".
