= School District 54 Bulkley Valley =

School district in British Columbia, Canada

Location
- Smithers Smithers, Telkwa, Houston in Northwest Canada

District information
- Superintendent: Michael McDiarmid
- Schools: 7
- Budget: CA$21.2 million

Students and staff
- Students: 1966 (2020/21 School year)

Other information
- Website: www.sd54.bc.ca

School District 54 Bulkley Valley is a school district in northwestern British Columbia. Centered in Smithers, it includes the communities of Telkwa, Houston, and Witset.

== History ==
Except for the two schools in Houston, the elementary schools in school district 54 used to be K-6 and the highschools used to be 9–12. Grade 7 and 8 students in the district used to go Chandler Park Middle School until it was closed in the summer of 2004 due to provincial budget cuts.

== Schools ==
School	Location	Grades	School number
Houston Secondary School	Houston	8-12	
Lake Kathlyn Elementary School (Closed)	Smithers	K-7	
Muheim Memorial Elementary School	Smithers	K-7	
Quick Elementary School (Closed)	Telkwa	K-7	5454001
Silverthorne Elementary School	Houston	K-7	
Smithers Secondary School	Smithers	8-12	
Telkwa Elementary School	Telkwa	K-7	
Twain Sullivan Elementary School	Houston	K-7	
Walnut Park Elementary School	Smithers	K-7	

== See also ==
- List of school districts in British Columbia
