= Northland Sun =

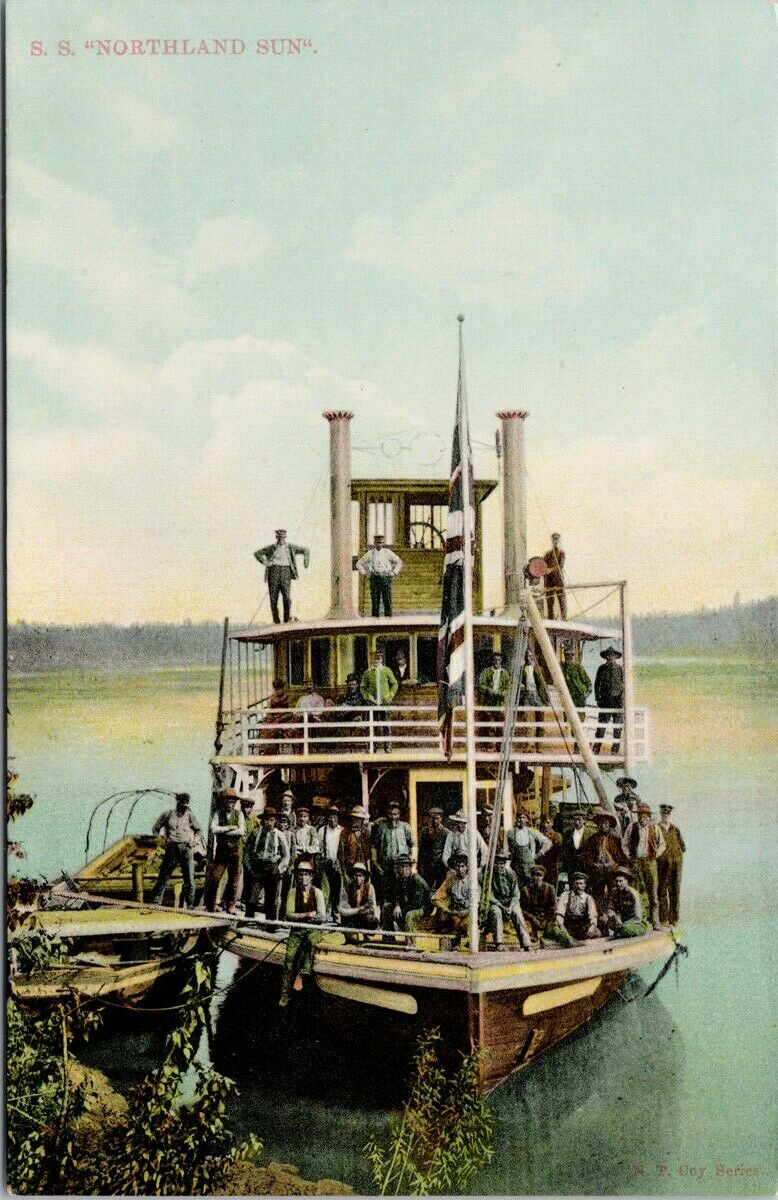

The Northland Sun was a sternwheel steam ship, built in 1909, that operated on the Mackenzie River system. She was the fourth steamboat to be built locally at Athabasca Landing, the Northern End of an overland route connecting the Saskatchewan River to the Athabasca River and the Mackenzie River system.

In 1910, J.K. Cornwall and Herbert Vanderhoof, owners and local promoters, invited journalists and scientists for a free trip on the first voyage of the season.
