= Houston, British Columbia =

Houston
- District municipality
- District of Houston
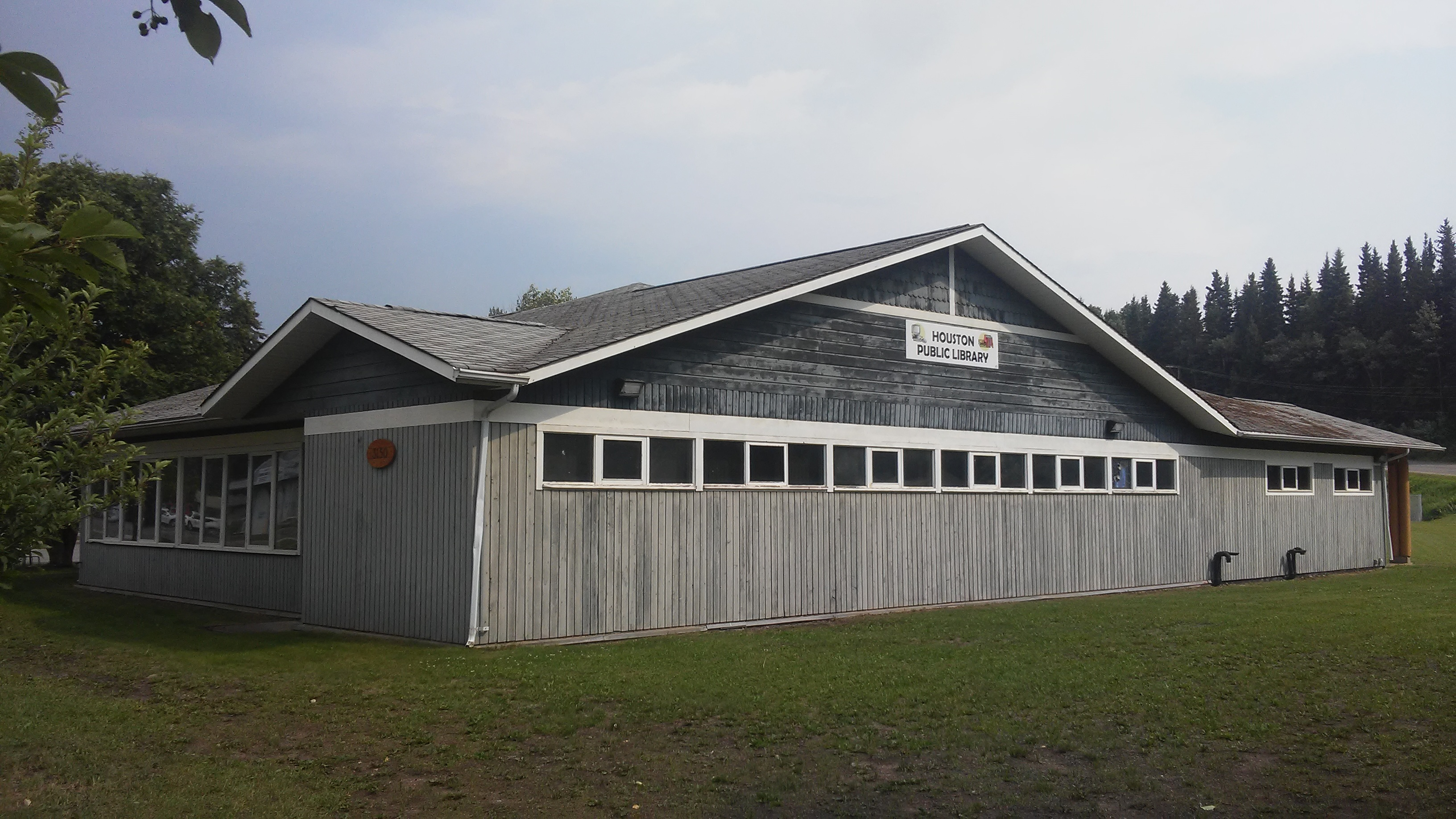
- Houston Public Library

- Location of Houston in British Columbia Houston (Canada)
- Coordinates: 54°23′51″N 126°38′31″W
- Country: Canada
- Province: British Columbia
- Region: Bulkley Valley
- Regional district: Regional District of Bulkley-Nechako
- Incorporated: 1957

Government
  - Mayor: Shane Brienen

Area
  - Total: 72.94 km^{2} (28.16 sq mi)
- Elevation: 610 m (2,000 ft)

Population (2021)
  - Total: 3,052
  - Density: 41.9/km^{2} (109/sq mi)
- Time zone: UTC−07:00 (PT)
- Area code: 250 / 778 / 236
- Highways: Highway 16 (TCH) Trans-Canada Highway
- Website: District of Houston

Houston (/ˈhjuːstən/ HEW-stən) is a forestry, mining and tourism town in the Bulkley Valley of the Northern Interior of British Columbia, Canada. Its population as of 2021 was 3,052, with approximately 2,000 in the surrounding rural area. It is known as the "steelhead capital" and it has the world's largest fly fishing rod. Houston's tourism industry is largely based on ecotourism and Steelhead Park, situated along the Yellowhead Highway (Highway 16). Houston is named in honour of the pioneer newspaperman John Houston.

== History ==
The Morice area was first charted by amateur historian, cartographer and geologist, Reverend Adrien-Gabriel Morice (1859-1938) known to northern British Columbian locals as "Father Morice." In 1880, Morice came to British Columbia as a Catholic missionary to the native people and was one of the first 'white men' to see most of the area. Morice wrote The History of the Northern Interior of British Columbia (formerly New Caledonia) [1660 to 1880]. The Indigenous people were initially known as Carrier Indians, but today are more commonly referred to as the Wet'suwet'en (sometimes spelled Wit'suwit'en) and speak a language commonly referred to as Dakeł (Northern Athabaskan or Na-Dene language). The Morice River is called "Wet-zuhn-kwa" by the Wet'suwet'en people because of the bluish-green colour of the water.

Wet-zuhn-kwa produces fresh water species like rainbow trout, cutthroat trout, and Dolly Varden trout (bull trout). Pacific salmon species include Chinook salmon (spring or king salmon), sockeye salmon, pink salmon (humpies or humpbacks), coho salmon, and steelhead salmon, an anadromous form of the coastal rainbow trout.

The area is also rich in wildlife as it is not uncommon to spot moose, deer, black bear, grizzly bear, cougars and so on. Nanika River feeds Morice Lake and produces sockeye salmon. In the 1970s, the proposed Kemano Completion Project threatened to dam Nanika River. The project was eventually shelved. Morice River is a tributary of the Skeena river system, which is the second-largest system in BC that enters the Pacific Ocean at Prince Rupert.

In 1983, a huge forest-fire that started at Parrot Lakes threatened the community of Houston. A campfire being used by two tourists from Switzerland got out of control. The fire became known as the "Swiss Fire" and burned notable landmarks like Rose Ranch and Morice Mountain. In the post World War II era, many settlers in the region between Prince George and Prince Rupert arrived as a result of the Frontier Apostle movement.

== Geography ==
West of Houston are Telkwa (49 kilometres or 30 miles), Smithers (66 km or 41 mi), Witset (97 km or 60 mi), Old Hazelton, New Hazelton (130 km or 81 mi), Terrace (269 km or 167 mi), and Prince Rupert (413 km or 257 mi). East of Houston are Topley (30 km or 19 mi), Granisle (79 km or 49 mi), Burns Lake (81 km or 50 mi), Fraser Lake (150 km or 93 mi), and Prince George (304 km or 189 mi).

Houston is located near the confluence of the Bulkley River and Morice River approximately 65 kilometres (40 mi) south of Smithers along Highway 16. Buck Creek also joins the Bulkley River near the community by the local mall. Historically, Buck Creek formed a delta where most of the downtown is located. The delta was channelled and dyked which probably led to the downfall and destruction of important, rearing habitat of young salmon produced in that stream.

The area is in a rain shadow of the Coast Mountains, however due to being dominated by a low pressure region, Houston receives substantial cloud cover and a mid-range volume of precipitation annually.

Morice Lake is located 80 kilometres (50 mi) south along the Morice River Forest Service Road (FSR). Nestled into the Coast Mountains, many Houstonites use this area for recreational camping and fishing.

The Bulkley, a small stream running through Houston, and the Morice River join just west of Houston. At the point of their joining they become the Bulkley River, not the Morice despite the fact the Morice is larger. This was done by Poudrier, a government cartographer who, it is rumoured, never saw the region. The Bulkley is named for American engineer, Colonel Charles S. Bulkley, one of the surveyors constructing the Russian–American Telegraph line through the Pleasant Valley. This was in the late 1800s.

Nearby communities:

- Barrett
- Buck Flats
- Burns Lake
- Decker Lake
- Duncan Lake (Broman Lake)
- Endako
- Forestdale
- Fort Babine
- Fort Fraser
- François Lake
- Fraser Lake
- Granisle
- Grassy Plains
- Noralee
- Old Fort
- Palling
- Perow
- Quick
- Rose Lake
- Round Lake
- Smithers
- Southbank
- Telkwa
- Topley
- Topley Landing
- Walcott
- Witset (formerly Moricetown)

=== Climate ===
Houston has a humid continental climate (Köppen Dfb) with mild summers and cold winters. Houston is not as prone to extreme temperature record swings as some other nearby areas, but still retains sizeable seasonal differences and has a temperature amplitude of 76 °C (137 °F). Being in a rain shadow of the coastal mountains, Houston has a quite dry climate with relatively uniform precipitation year-round. Annual snowfall is still quite high due to the five-month period with means below freezing.

== Demographics ==
In the 2021 Census of Population conducted by Statistics Canada, Houston had a population of 3,052 living in 1,271 of its 1,461 total private dwellings, a change of 2% from its 2016 population of 2,993. With a land area of 72.88 square kilometres (28.14 sq mi), it had a population density of 41.9 inhabitants per square kilometre (109/sq mi) in 2021.

Federal census population history

Year	Pop.	±%
1961	699	—
1966	699	+0.0%
1971	2,232	+219.3%
1976	2,673	+19.8%
1981	3,921	+46.7%
1986	3,905	−0.4%
1991	3,628	−7.1%

Year	Pop.	±%
1996	3,934	+8.4%
2001	3,577	−9.1%
2006	3,163	−11.6%
2011	3,147	−0.5%
2016	2,993	−4.9%
2021	3,052	+2.0%

Source: Statistics Canada

=== Ethnicity ===
Panethnic groups in the District of Houston (1986−2021)
Panethnic group	2021		2016		2011		2006		2001		1996		1991		1986	
Panethnic group	Pop.	%	Pop.	%	Pop.	%	Pop.	%	Pop.	%	Pop.	%	Pop.	%	Pop.	%
European (Note: Statistic includes all persons that did not make up part of a visible minority or an indigenous identity.)	2,295	76.12%	2,330	78.06%	2,555	81.5%	2,610	82.46%	2,930	81.84%	3,450	87.79%	2,970	81.82%	3,260	83.48%
Indigenous	530	17.58%	495	16.58%	370	11.8%	375	11.85%	335	9.36%	135	3.44%	355	9.78%	265	6.79%
South Asian	80	2.65%	60	2.01%	175	5.58%	150	4.74%	245	6.84%	290	7.38%	255	7.02%	320	8.19%
African	55	1.82%	50	1.68%	15	0.48%	0	0%	0	0%	10	0.25%	0	0%	0	0%
Southeast Asian (Note: Statistic includes total responses of "Filipino" and "Southeast Asian" under visible minority section on census.)	40	1.33%	25	0.84%	15	0.48%	10	0.32%	30	0.84%	15	0.38%	10	0.28%	15	0.38%
East Asian (Note: Statistic includes total responses of "Chinese", "Korean", and "Japanese" under visible minority section on census.)	25	0.83%	20	0.67%	10	0.32%	20	0.63%	45	1.26%	10	0.25%	30	0.83%	40	1.02%
Latin American	0	0%	0	0%	0	0%	0	0%	0	0%	10	0.25%	10	0.28%	5	0.13%
Middle Eastern (Note: Statistic includes total responses of "West Asian" and "Arab" under visible minority section on census.)	0	0%	0	0%	0	0%	0	0%	0	0%	0	0%	0	0%	0	0%
Other/multiracial (Note: Statistic includes total responses of "Visible minority, n.i.e." and "Multiple visible minorities" under visible minority section on census.)	0	0%	0	0%	0	0%	0	0%	0	0%	10	0.25%	—N/a	—N/a	—N/a	—N/a
Total responses	3,015	98.79%	2,985	99.73%	3,135	99.62%	3,165	100.06%	3,580	100.08%	3,930	99.9%	3,630	100.06%	3,905	100%
Total population	3,052	100%	2,993	100%	3,147	100%	3,163	100%	3,577	100%	3,934	100%	3,628	100%	3,905	100%
Note: Totals greater than 100% due to multiple origin responses.

=== Religion ===
According to the 2021 census, religious groups in Houston included:

- Irreligion (1,685 persons or 55.9%)
- Christianity (1,230 persons or 40.8%)
- Sikhism (45 persons or 1.5%)
- Hinduism (25 persons or 0.8%)
- Buddhism (15 persons or 0.5%)
- Other (10 persons or 0.3%)

Religious groups in Houston (1991−2021)
Religious group	2021		2011		2001		1991	
Religious group	Pop.	%	Pop.	%	Pop.	%	Pop.	%
Irreligious	1,685	55.89%	1,460	46.57%	1,210	33.8%	1,110	30.58%
Christian	1,230	40.8%	1,475	47.05%	2,115	59.08%	2,250	61.98%
Sikh	45	1.49%	155	4.94%	245	6.84%	255	7.02%
Hindu	25	0.83%	0	0%	0	0%	0	0%
Buddhist	15	0.5%	0	0%	0	0%	0	0%
Jewish	0	0%	0	0%	10	0.28%	0	0%
Muslim	0	0%	0	0%	0	0%	0	0%
Indigenous spirituality	0	0%	0	0%	N/A	N/A	N/A	N/A
Other religion	10	0.33%	25	0.8%	10	0.28%	0	0%
Total responses	3,015	98.79%	3,135	99.62%	3,580	100.08%	3,630	100.06%

== Transportation ==
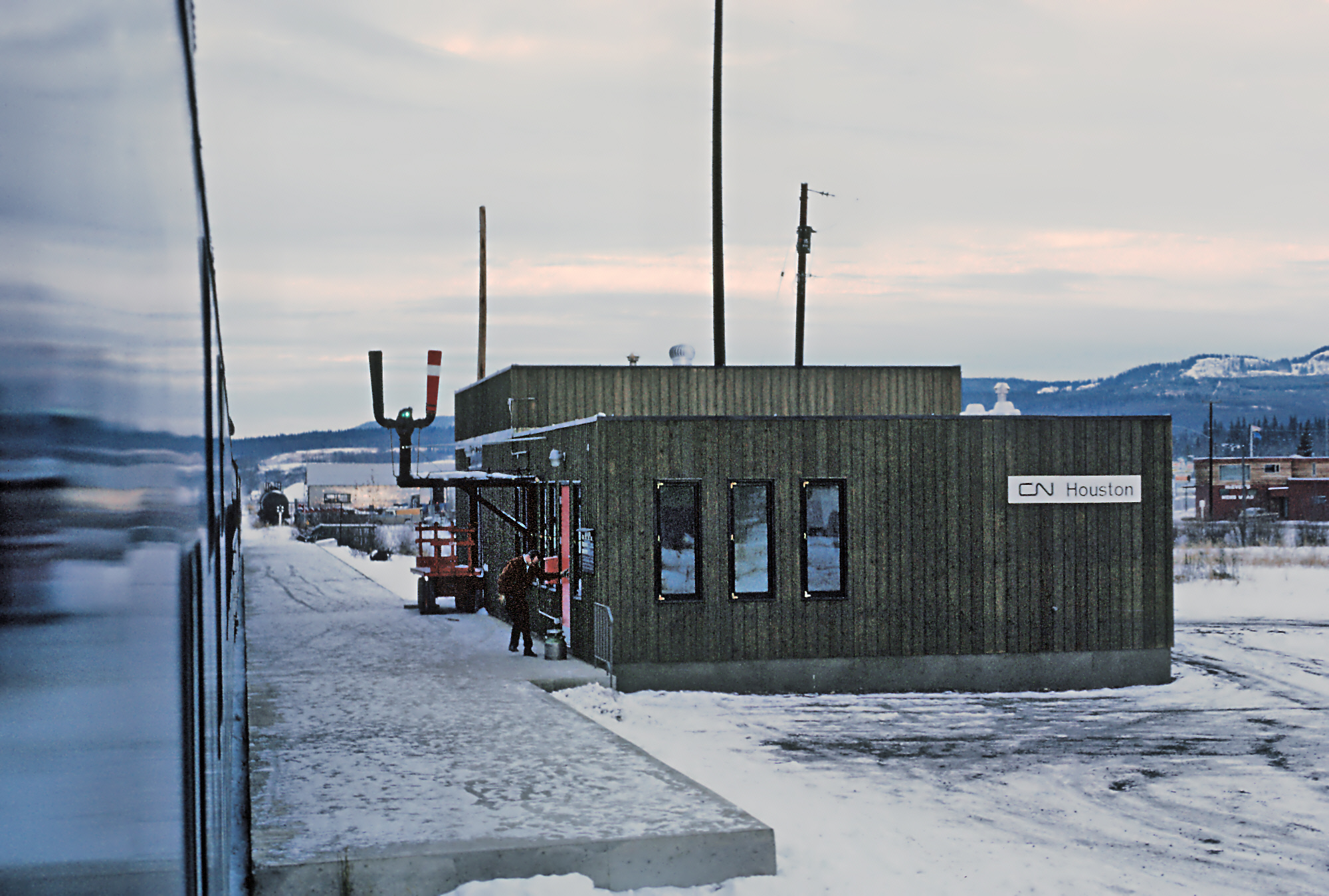
Houston station, 1971

Via Rail's Jasper–Prince Rupert train calls at the Houston railway station several times per week. Houston can be reached by the Trans-Canada Highway, which enters the community as Highway 16, part of the Yellowhead Highway. Located 5 nautical miles (9.3 km; 5.8 mi) northwest of the community is Houston Aerodrome which is operated by the District of Houston. The aerodrome has no scheduled service.

== Politics ==
Houston is located in the federal electoral district of Skeena-Bulkley Valley. As of 2025, Ellis Ross is the Member of Parliament. He won in the election of 2025 after incumbent Taylor Bachrach was defeated.

Provincially, Houston is located in the Nechako Lakes electoral district. John Rustad is the current MLA as of 2023. Rustad was first elected in 2009 representing the BC Liberal Party, and was re-elected in 2013, 2017 and 2020. Following the election of 2020, Rustad sat briefly as an Independent in the BC Legislative Assembly. He then switched to the BC Conservative Party in 2023.

== Recreation ==
The Houston Hikers' Society provides website where trail information, maps, photos and driving directions can be accessed. The Morice Mountain Nordic Ski Club is a volunteer non-profit society. The MMNSC is responsible for all developments and trail grooming as well as maintenance of the facilities, and for trail users' fee collections. The ski trails are situated 8 km (5 mi) south of Houston on Buck Flats Road. Skiing enthusiasts are able to explore over 45 km (28 mi) of challenging and beginner trails covering a rolling topography around Silverthorne Lake.

Many locals frequent the Nanika-Kidprice Lakes Basin canoe route. This basin lies on the eastern slope of the Coastal Mountain Range and forms the upper watershed of the Morice-Bulkley rivers. The basin area is 920 m (3,020 ft) above sea level and is surrounded by glaciated and snow-capped peaks that rise as high as 2,400 m (7,900 ft). The 30 km (19 mi) route takes about three or four days to complete. There is approximately 4 km (2 mi) of portages between three lakes.

The recently constructed Houston Leisure Facility holds a pool, hot-tub, sauna and fitness gym. Houston has a nine-hole golf course. Jamie Baxter Park was named after a boy that disappeared in the forest while playing in the Buck Flats area in the late 1970s. It was fall-time and temperatures at night dipped below 0 °C (32 °F) and the boy eventually lost his life.

== Education ==
Houston is located in School District 54 Bulkley Valley and has three public schools and one privately run Christian denominational school.

Elementary schools:

- Silverthorne Elementary School
- Twain Sullivan Elementary School

Secondary schools:

- Houston Secondary School

The Houston Christian School teaches from K-12.
