= Fraser Lake =

- Village
- Village of Fraser Lake
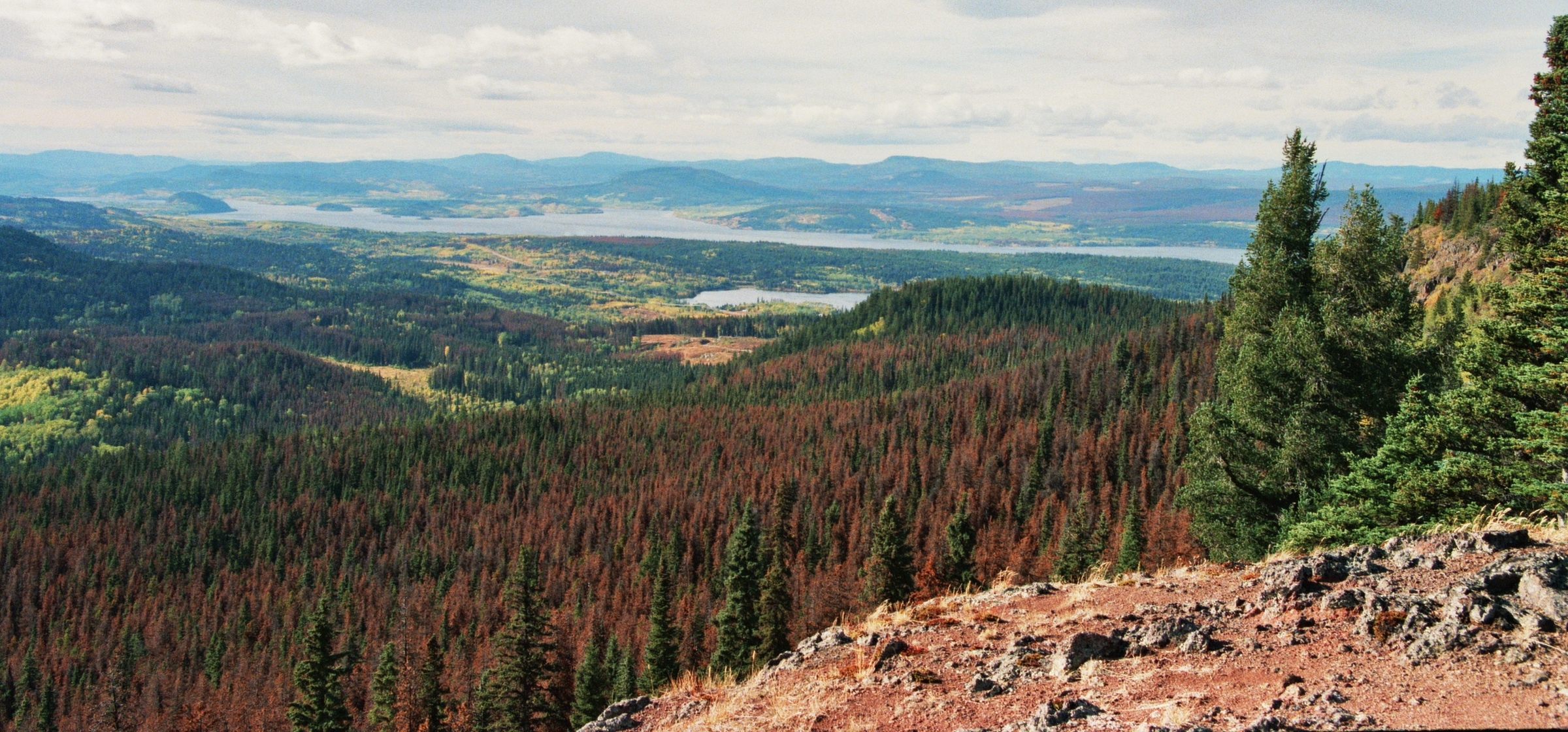
- Fraser Lake from Mount Fraser
- Motto: "White swan capital of the world!"
- Location of Fraser Lake in British Columbia
- Coordinates: 54°03′30″N 124°50′49″W
- Country: Canada
- Province: British Columbia
- Region: BC Interior
- Regional district: Regional District of Bulkley-Nechako
- Incorporated: 1966

Government
  - Governing body: Fraser Lake Village Council
  - Mayor: Sarrah Storey

Area
  - Total: 4.07 km^{2} (1.57 sq mi)
- Elevation: 700 m (2,300 ft)

Population (2016)
  - Total: 988
  - Density: 242.9/km^{2} (629/sq mi)
- Time zone: UTC−07:00 (PT)
- Postal code: V0J 1S0
- Area code: 250
- Highways: Highway 16 (TCH)
- Waterways: Fraser Lake
- Website: www.fraserlake.ca

Fraser Lake is a village in northern British Columbia, Canada. It's located on the southwest side of Fraser Lake between Burns Lake and Vanderhoof alongside the Yellowhead Highway.

The small community's population is primarily employed by either the forest industry. (Fraser Lake Sawmills, or various logging contractors) The Endako Mines, a large molybdenum mine was a former large employer.

The pioneer roots of the area's history date back to the fur trade, with the establishment in 1806 of a fur-trading post by Simon Fraser, at Fort Fraser near the east end of Fraser Lake. The modern day town was established in 1914, during the construction of the Grand Trunk Pacific Railway, and was incorporated as a village in 1966.

== Demographics ==
In the 2021 Census of Population conducted by Statistics Canada, Fraser Lake had a population of 965 living in 444 of its 543 total private dwellings, a change of −2.3% from its 2016 population of 988. With a land area of 4.06 km^{2} (1.57 sq mi), it had a population density of 237.7/km^{2} (615.6/sq mi) in 2021.

== Directions ==
Fraser Lake is supported by nearby communities:

East (Hwy 16):

- Fort Fraser - 21 km (13 mi)
- Vanderhoof - 59 km (37 mi)
- Prince George - 155 km (96 mi)

West (Hwy 16):

- Burns Lake - 69 km (43 mi)
- Topley - 120 km (75 mi)
- Houston - 150 km (93 mi)
- Smithers - 213 km (132 mi)
- Terrace - 416 km (258 mi)
- Prince Rupert - 560 km (348 mi)

North: East Hwy 16, North Hwy 27):

- Fort St. James - 105 km (65 mi)

== Climate ==
Fraser Lake is characterized by a continental climate meaning cold, snowy winters and cool to warm summers.

Climate data for Fraser Lake
| Month | Jan | Feb | Mar | Apr | May | Jun | Jul | Aug | Sep | Oct | Nov | Dec | Year |
|---|---|---|---|---|---|---|---|---|---|---|---|---|---|
| Record high °C (°F) | 11.0 (51.8) | 11.0 (51.8) | 17.0 (62.6) | 23.9 (75.0) | 32.5 (90.5) | 32.5 (90.5) | 34.0 (93.2) | 35.0 (95.0) | 32.0 (89.6) | 23.0 (73.4) | 16.5 (61.7) | 12.0 (53.6) | 35.0 (95.0) |
| Mean daily maximum °C (°F) | −5.2 (22.6) | −1.1 (30.0) | 4.2 (39.6) | 10.5 (50.9) | 16.1 (61.0) | 19.7 (67.5) | 22.2 (72.0) | 21.9 (71.4) | 16.8 (62.2) | 9.4 (48.9) | 0.8 (33.4) | −4.0 (24.8) | 9.3 (48.7) |
| Daily mean °C (°F) | −9.5 (14.9) | −6.4 (20.5) | −1.6 (29.1) | 4.1 (39.4) | 9.4 (48.9) | 13.1 (55.6) | 15.4 (59.7) | 14.9 (58.8) | 10.4 (50.7) | 4.7 (40.5) | −2.5 (27.5) | −7.9 (17.8) | 3.7 (38.7) |
| Mean daily minimum °C (°F) | −13.8 (7.2) | −11.7 (10.9) | −7.4 (18.7) | −2.3 (27.9) | 2.6 (36.7) | 6.5 (43.7) | 8.5 (47.3) | 7.9 (46.2) | 4.1 (39.4) | −0.1 (31.8) | −5.7 (21.7) | −11.6 (11.1) | −1.9 (28.6) |
| Record low °C (°F) | −46.1 (−51.0) | −42.0 (−43.6) | −38.9 (−38.0) | −20.5 (−4.9) | −7.2 (19.0) | −3.0 (26.6) | −1.5 (29.3) | −2.5 (27.5) | −7.0 (19.4) | −24.0 (−11.2) | −39.0 (−38.2) | −47.5 (−53.5) | −47.5 (−53.5) |
| Average precipitation mm (inches) | 47.9 (1.89) | 29.5 (1.16) | 25.7 (1.01) | 23.1 (0.91) | 42.0 (1.65) | 57.0 (2.24) | 57.4 (2.26) | 46.5 (1.83) | 47.9 (1.89) | 54.8 (2.16) | 48.8 (1.92) | 45.2 (1.78) | 525.8 (20.70) |
| Average rainfall mm (inches) | 5.4 (0.21) | 4.3 (0.17) | 5.4 (0.21) | 16.6 (0.65) | 40.9 (1.61) | 57.0 (2.24) | 57.4 (2.26) | 46.5 (1.83) | 47.9 (1.89) | 46.2 (1.82) | 19.3 (0.76) | 3.9 (0.15) | 350.7 (13.81) |
| Average snowfall cm (inches) | 42.5 (16.7) | 25.2 (9.9) | 20.3 (8.0) | 6.5 (2.6) | 1.1 (0.4) | 0.0 (0.0) | 0.0 (0.0) | 0.0 (0.0) | 0.0 (0.0) | 8.7 (3.4) | 29.5 (11.6) | 41.3 (16.3) | 175.1 (68.9) |
| Average precipitation days (≥ 0.2 mm) | 12.4 | 9.1 | 9.2 | 8.5 | 12.5 | 14.0 | 13.0 | 12.2 | 12.5 | 15.2 | 14.1 | 11.5 | 144.1 |
| Average rainy days (≥ 0.2 mm) | 2.1 | 2.3 | 3.4 | 6.5 | 12.1 | 14.0 | 13.0 | 12.2 | 12.5 | 14.0 | 6.7 | 1.7 | 100.5 |
| Average snowy days (≥ 0.2 cm) | 11.1 | 7.2 | 6.6 | 2.7 | 0.5 | 0.0 | 0.0 | 0.0 | 0.0 | 2.3 | 9.1 | 10.6 | 50.2 |

== Notable people ==
- Tianda Flegel - winner of the second season of The Next Star.
