= Houston Secondary School =

Houston Secondary

Location
- PO Box 1600; Houston, British Columbia, V0J 1Z0; Canada

Information
- School type: Public, high school
- School board: School District 54 Bulkley Valley
- School number: 5454011
- Principal: Jaksun Grice
- Staff: 32 (September 2020)
- Grades: 8-12
- Enrollment: 178 (2020/21 School year)
- Language: English, French
- Colours: Silver and Green
- Mascot: Wolverine
- Team name: Wolverines
- Website: hssweb.sd54.bc.ca

Houston Secondary is a public high school in Houston, British Columbia, part of School District 54 Bulkley Valley. The school enrolls approx 178 students and is the largest in the community. It serves as the secondary school for Houston and the surrounding rural communities.
