= Herbert Vanderhoof =

- Born: October 23, 1875; Saint Paul, Minnesota
- Died: August 7, 1921 (aged 45); Winnetka, Illinois
- Burial place: Rosehill Cemetery
- Occupation(s): Executive, advertising executive
- Known for: Publicizing the development of Canada's North

Herbert Vanderhoof (1875–1921) was editor of Canada West magazine, and an early promoter of development in Canada's north.

== Early life and education ==
Herbert Vanderhoof was born in Saint Paul, Minnesota on October 23, 1875. He was educated at the Boston Institute of Technology and the University of Chicago.

== Career ==
He started his career in Portland, Maine as a newspaper man, subsequently working in Worcester, Boston, and Chicago on journals.

In 1906, he became secretary of the Western Canadian Immigration Association. He also founded Canada Monthly Magazine, and spent around 10 years working for a number of Canadian railways as an advertising representative. He was a founding board member of the Northern Transportation Company. In that capacity he and company President J.K. Cornwall invited scientists and journalists to be their guests on the Northland Sun's first voyage of the season.

In 1914, he helped found the city of Vanderhoof, British Columbia. Carla Funk, born in Vanderhoof, said the welcome sign of the city described Vanderhoof as a "Chicago newspaperman". She wrote that Vanderhoof's intention was to found a community of artists and creatives, as he was inspired by the location's natural beauty, although the local economy became more dependent on logging and hunting.

He founded Vanderhoof and Company, an advertising company, back in Chicago in 1916. He served as president. During World War I, he was a member of the idea committee of the National Art Service League.

== Personal life and death ==
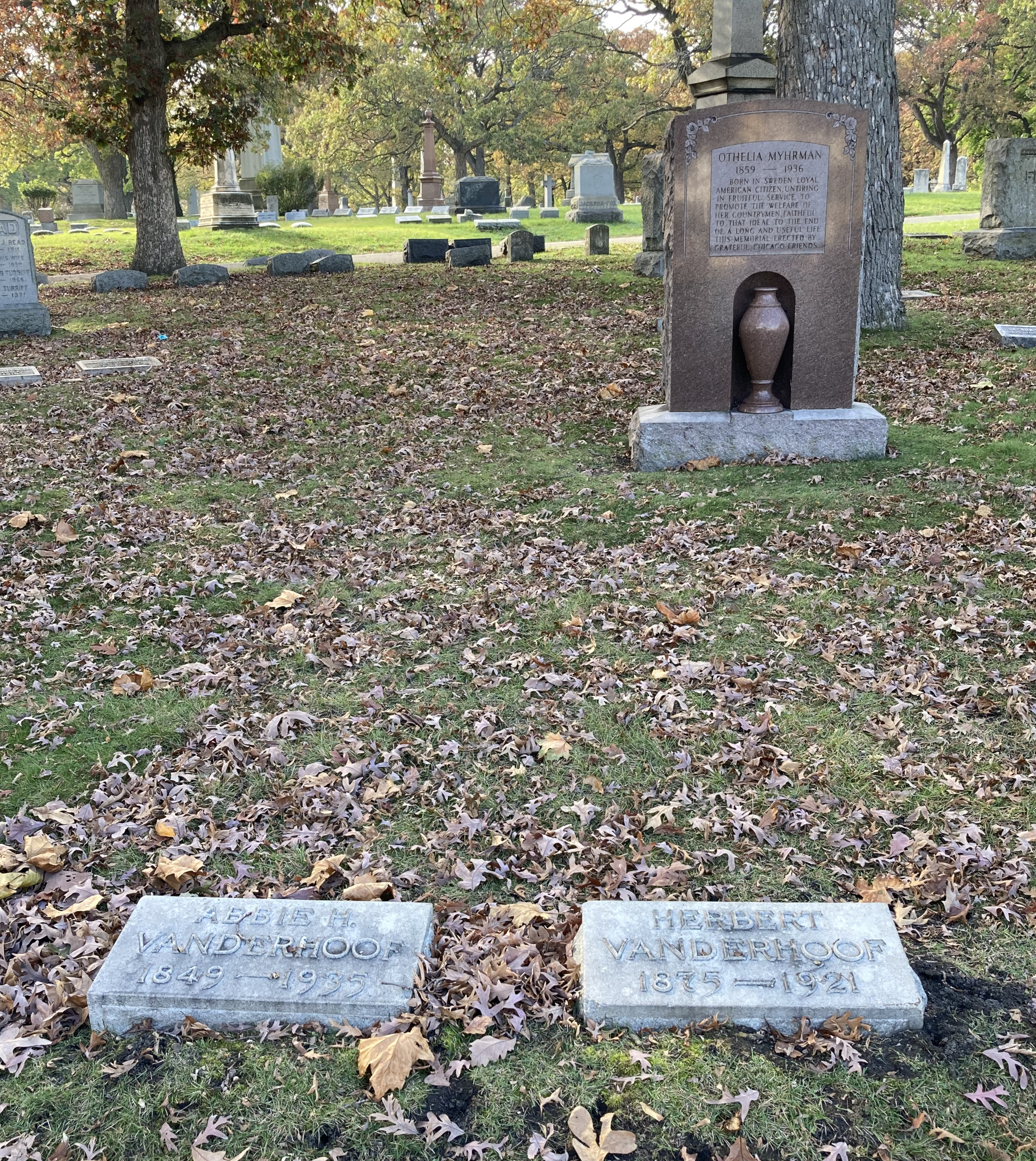
Vanderhoof's grave (lower right) at Rosehill Cemetery

He died in Winnetka, Illinois on August 7, 1921, and was buried at Rosehill Cemetery in Chicago. He was survived by his wife, mother, and daughter Mary.
