= Exchamsiks River Provincial Park =

Provincial park in British Columbia, Canada

Exchamsiks River Park
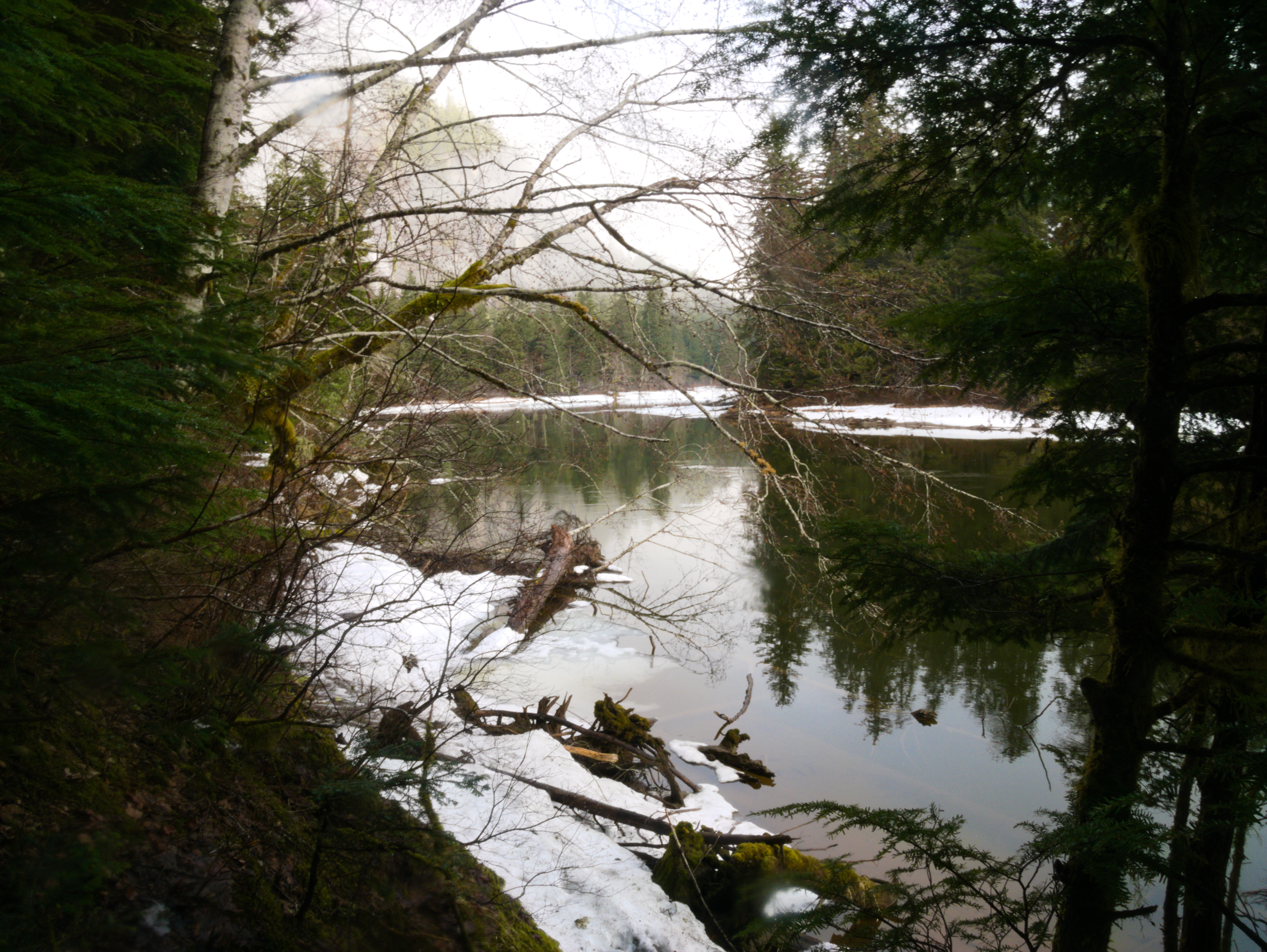
- A quiet winter's morning on the west bank of Exchamsiks River Park, north of the boat launch

- Location within British Columbia
- Interactive map of Exchamsiks River Park
- Location: Canada
- Coordinates: 54°20′09″N 129°17′46″W
- Area: 18.21 ha (45.0 acres)
- Established: 1956
- Operator: BC Parks

Exchamsiks River Provincial Park is a provincial park in British Columbia, Canada, located in the Range 5 Coast Land District, on the north side of the Skeena River between Terrace and Prince Rupert. The park's chief conservation role focuses on protecting one of the last known unlogged old-growth maritime coastal Sitka spruce-salmonberry ecosystems.

== Activities ==
Vast swaths of coastal Sitka spruce rainforest rise where the Exchamsiks River and Skeena River meet. It is through wilderness such as this that visitors pass if they take the trail. Most of the trails in the park are easily navigable and require no expert guidance. There are areas on the two rivers of the park where fishing enthusiasts can go after salmon.

The park has two day-use areas. The first one, located on the Exchamsiks's west side, affords a boat launch area, open year-round. The other is on the east side of the Exchamsiks, and mostly consists of trails that meander in and out of the forest. Camping is prohibited in the Exchamsiks River Provincial Park.
