= Regional District of Bulkley-Nechako =

Regional district in British Columbia, Canada

Bulkley–Nechako
- Regional district
- Regional District of Bulkley–Nechako
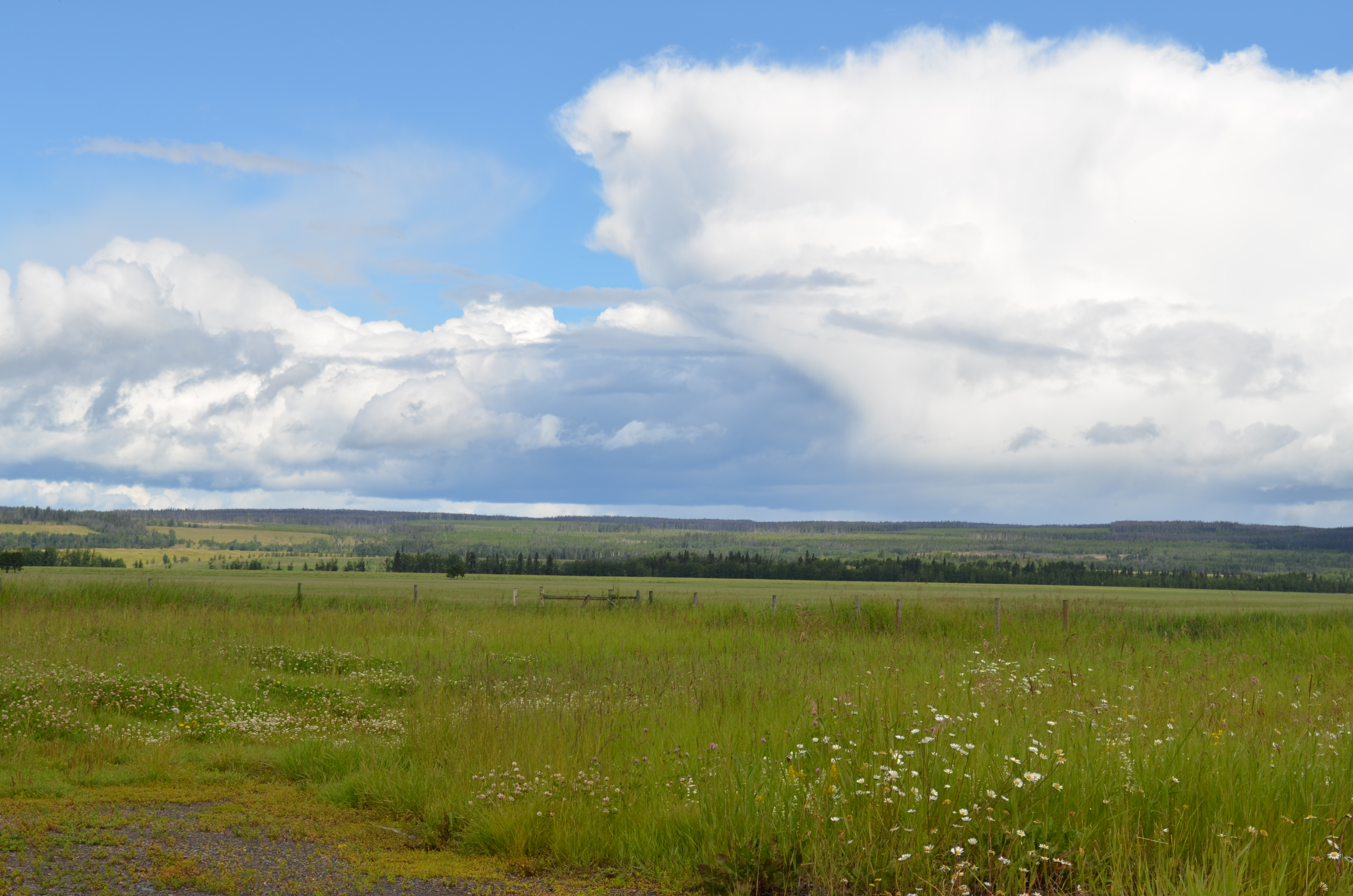
- Summer clouds over Vanderhoof

- Seal

- Location in British Columbia
- Coordinates: 54.350°N 125.735°W
- Country: Canada
- Province: British Columbia
- Administrative office location: Burns Lake

Government
  - Body: Board of directors
  - Chair: Mark Parker (D) November 2022/2023
  - Vice chair: Shane Brienen (G)
  - Electoral areas: A – Smithers; B – Burns Lake; C – Fort St. James; D – Fraser Lake; E – Francois/Ootsa; F – Vanderhoof; G – Houston

Area
  - Land: 73,361.00 km^{2} (28,324.84 sq mi)

Population (2021)
  - Total: 37,737
  - Density: 0.52/km^{2} (1.3/sq mi)
- Website: www.rdbn.bc.ca

The Regional District of Bulkley–Nechako (RDBN) is a regional district in the Canadian province of British Columbia, Canada. As of the 2021 census, the population was 37,737. The area is 73,419.01 square kilometres. The regional district offices are in Burns Lake.

== Geography ==
Its geographical components are the Bulkley Valley, the northern part of the Nechako Country, and the Omineca Country, including portions of the Hazelton Mountains and Omineca Mountains in the west and north of the regional district, respectively. The dominant landform is the Nechako Plateau. Neighbouring regional districts are the Kitimat-Stikine, Central Coast, Cariboo, Fraser-Fort George, and Peace River Regional Districts; on its north the boundary with the southern edge of the remote Stikine Region is separated from the Bulkley–Nechako Regional District by the 56th parallel north. The boundaries of the regional district near-entirely coincide with the territory of the Dakelh or Carrier peoples, and also some of that of the Dunneza (Beaver), but their reserves and governments lie outside the regional district system. Roughly identical in area to the old New Caledonia fur district in the days of the North West Company, it is still sometimes referenced as New Caledonia, but while trapping continues in some area, its economy is now based in forestry, mining, tourism (mostly ranching in southern areas).

The area is home to at least 20 lakes, such as Binta Lake. Around July 28, 2010, the Binta Lake fire began, causing at least 100 people across the regional district to be ordered evacuated.

== Municipalities ==
Municipality	Government Type	Population
Smithers	town	5,378
Vanderhoof	district municipality	4,346
Houston	district municipality	3,052
Burns Lake	village	1,659
Fort St. James	district municipality	1,598
Telkwa	village	1,295
Fraser Lake	village	988
Granisle	village	303

== Demographics ==
As a census division in the 2021 Census of Population conducted by Statistics Canada, the Regional District of Bulkley-Nechako had a population of 37,737 living in 15,399 of its 17,618 total private dwellings, a change of −0.4% from its 2016 population of 37,896. With a land area of 73,203.22 km^{2} (28,263.92 sq mi), it had a population density of 0.5/km^{2} (1.3/sq mi) in 2021.

Panethnic groups in the Bulkley–Nechako Regional District (1991–2021)
Panethnic group	2021		2016		2011		2006		2001		1996		1991	
Panethnic group	Pop.	%	Pop.	%	Pop.	%	Pop.	%	Pop.	%	Pop.	%	Pop.	%
European (Note: Statistic includes all persons that did not make up part of a visible minority or an indigenous identity.)	28,280	75.82%	28,740	76.75%	30,620	78.63%	29,805	78.18%	33,430	82.18%	34,625	83.41%	30,735	80.44%
Indigenous	7,410	19.87%	7,435	19.86%	7,335	18.84%	7,180	18.83%	6,020	14.8%	5,660	13.64%	6,085	15.93%
South Asian	455	1.22%	235	0.63%	370	0.95%	405	1.06%	615	1.51%	735	1.77%	840	2.2%
Southeast Asian (Note: Statistic includes total responses of "Filipino" and "Southeast Asian" under visible minority section on census.)	445	1.19%	385	1.03%	260	0.67%	230	0.6%	75	0.18%	205	0.49%	165	0.43%
East Asian (Note: Statistic includes total responses of "Chinese", "Korean", and "Japanese" under visible minority section on census.)	250	0.67%	260	0.69%	150	0.39%	260	0.68%	355	0.87%	150	0.36%	250	0.65%
African	240	0.64%	190	0.51%	120	0.31%	160	0.42%	140	0.34%	40	0.1%	85	0.22%
Latin American	95	0.25%	90	0.24%	65	0.17%	40	0.1%	15	0.04%	40	0.1%	35	0.09%
Middle Eastern (Note: Statistic includes total responses of "West Asian" and "Arab" under visible minority section on census.)	50	0.13%	25	0.07%	0	0%	10	0.03%	0	0%	0	0%	15	0.04%
Other (Note: Statistic includes total responses of "Visible minority, n.i.e." and "Multiple visible minorities" under visible minority section on census.)	70	0.19%	75	0.2%	0	0%	25	0.07%	20	0.05%	35	0.08%	—N/a	—N/a
Total responses	37,300	98.84%	37,445	98.81%	38,940	99.32%	38,125	99.69%	40,680	99.57%	41,510	99.68%	38,210	99.65%
Total population	37,737	100%	37,896	100%	39,208	100%	38,243	100%	40,856	100%	41,642	100%	38,343	100%
Note: Totals greater than 100% due to multiple origin responses.
