= Topley, British Columbia =

Coordinates: 54.5047°N 126.2982°W

Topley is a village in central British Columbia, Canada, located on the Yellowhead Highway (British Columbia Highway 16) between Houston and Burns Lake. It is named for the photographer William James Topley.
