= Vanderhoof, British Columbia =

Vanderhoof
- District municipality
- District of Vanderhoof
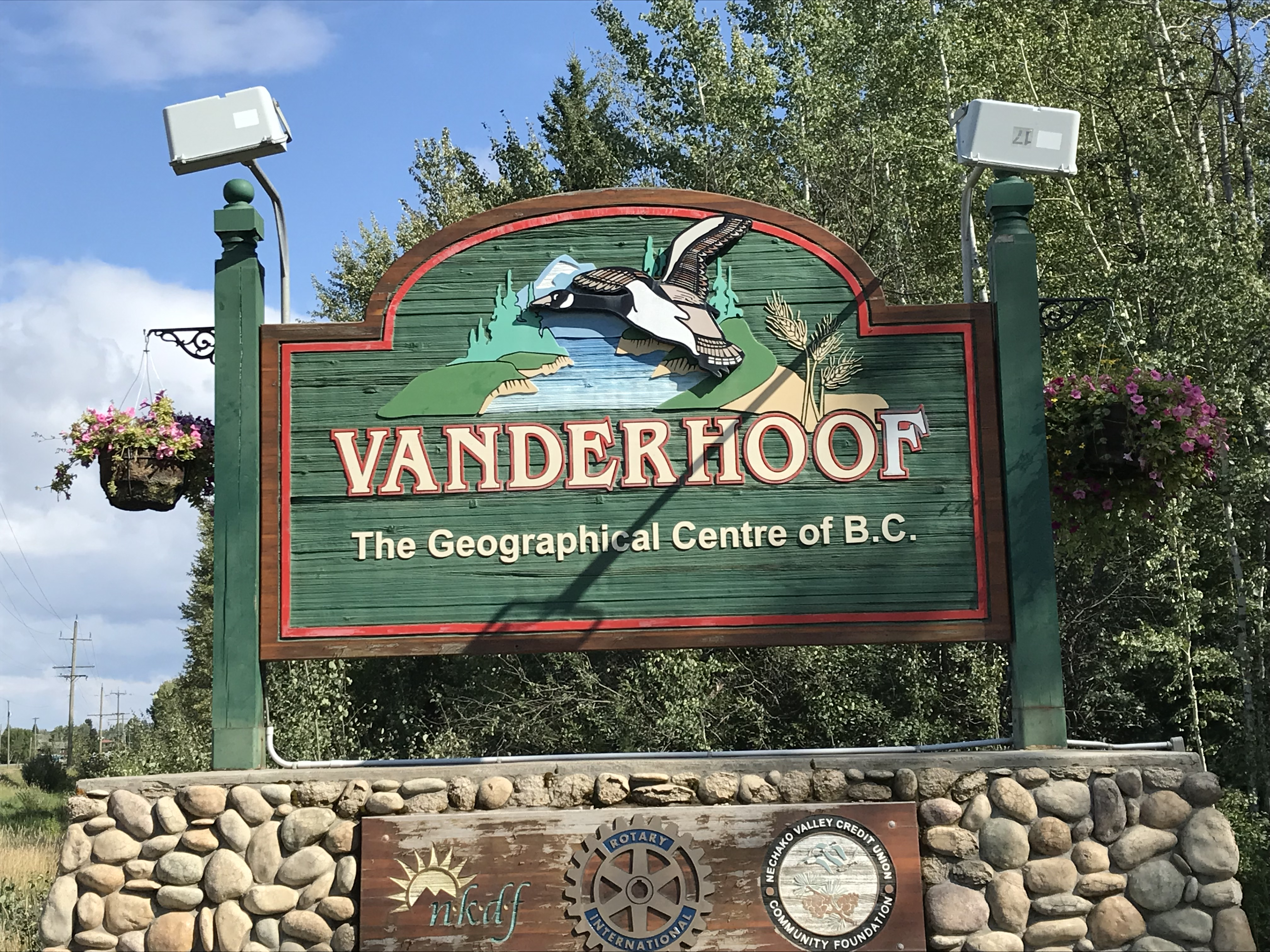

- Location of Vanderhoof in British Columbia
- Coordinates: 54°00′52″N 124°00′32″W
- Country: Canada
- Province: British Columbia
- Region: Interior Plateau
- Regional district: Regional District of Bulkley-Nechako
- Incorporated: 1926

Government
  - Mayor: Kevin Moutray
  - Chief Administrative Officer: Gerald Pinchbeck

Area
  - Total: 54.83 km^{2} (21.17 sq mi)
- Elevation: 640 m (2,100 ft)

Population (2021)
  - Total: 4,346
  - Density: 80.6/km^{2} (209/sq mi)
- Time zone: UTC−07:00 (PT)
- Area code: 250 / 778 / 236
- Highways: Highway 16 (TCH) Trans-Canada Highway; Highway 27
- Waterways: Nechako River
- Climate: Dfb
- Website: www.vanderhoof.ca

Vanderhoof is a district municipality near the geographical centre of British Columbia, Canada, and is situated on the unceded and traditional territory of the Saik'uz First Nation. Covering 2.92 square kilometers, it has a population of about 4,500 within town limits, and offers services to nearly 10,000 people in nearby rural communities. Its main industries are forestry, agriculture, and related businesses. Tourism is also growing, and mining operations are being developed in the area. It has several elementary schools and one major secondary school, Nechako Valley Secondary School (NVSS), as is a part of School District 91 Nechako Lakes. The College of New Caledonia also has a regional campus there.

Via Rail's Jasper–Prince Rupert train serves the Vanderhoof railway station.

== History ==
The area that would eventually become Vanderhoof was originally known as Khelhkoochek, a Saik'uz name that refers to the place where the Stoney Creek meets and flows into the Nechako River. It was a place of seasonal gathering for the people of the Saik'uz First Nation and an important spawning ground for the Nechako white sturgeon.

The name "Vanderhoof" comes from Herbert Vanderhoof, a Chicago newspaper writer and advertiser of Dutch descent employed by the Grand Trunk Pacific Development Company, a subsidiary of Grand Trunk Pacific Railway. Vanderhoof arrived at Khelhkoochek in 1912 and was tasked with creating advertisements to entice American and European immigrants to settle in the area.

Development of the Vanderhoof townsite grew rapidly from 1918 until World War II, when many men of the town left to fight overseas. After the war, an increase in lumber prices and the construction of the Kenney Dam again led to increases in the population.

Today, Vanderhoof is a service centre in the eastern Bulkley-Nechako for surrounding communities, and the second-largest municipality in the regional district.

== Demographics ==
In the 2021 Census of Population conducted by Statistics Canada, Vanderhoof had a population of 4,346 living in 1,786 of its 1,885 total private dwellings, a change of −2% from its 2016 population of 4,434. With a land area of 53.93 km^{2} (20.82 sq mi), it had a population density of 80.6/km^{2} (208.7/sq mi) in 2021.

=== Ethnicity ===
Panethnic groups in the District of Vanderhoof (1981–2021)
Panethnic group	2021		2016		2011		2006		2001		1996		1991		1986		1981	
Panethnic group	Pop.	%	Pop.	%	Pop.	%	Pop.	%	Pop.	%	Pop.	%	Pop.	%	Pop.	%	Pop.	%
European (Note: Statistic includes all persons that did not make up part of a visible minority or an indigenous identity.)	3,500	81.68%	3,665	85.13%	3,740	85.58%	3,550	87.44%	3,915	90.52%	4,050	92.89%	3,510	88.08%	3,055	88.55%	2,300	87.45%
Indigenous	480	11.2%	460	10.69%	485	11.1%	280	6.9%	230	5.32%	160	3.67%	325	8.16%	290	8.41%	170	6.46%
Southeast Asian (Note: Statistic includes total responses of "Filipino" and "Southeast Asian" under visible minority section on census.)	115	2.68%	90	2.09%	35	0.8%	75	1.85%	0	0%	0	0%	0	0%	5	0.14%	—N/a	—N/a
South Asian	70	1.63%	50	1.16%	75	1.72%	35	0.86%	130	3.01%	95	2.18%	120	3.01%	70	2.03%	110	4.18%
African	40	0.93%	15	0.35%	15	0.34%	65	1.6%	0	0%	30	0.69%	15	0.38%	0	0%	—N/a	—N/a
Latin American	25	0.58%	10	0.23%	0	0%	0	0%	10	0.23%	0	0%	0	0%	0	0%	0	0%
East Asian (Note: Statistic includes total responses of "Chinese", "Korean", and "Japanese" under visible minority section on census.)	15	0.35%	20	0.46%	10	0.23%	30	0.74%	45	1.04%	15	0.34%	15	0.38%	30	0.87%	50	1.9%
Middle Eastern (Note: Statistic includes total responses of "West Asian" and "Arab" under visible minority section on census.)	0	0%	0	0%	0	0%	20	0.49%	0	0%	0	0%	0	0%	0	0%	0	0%
Other/multiracial (Note: Statistic includes total responses of "Visible minority, n.i.e." and "Multiple visible minorities" under visible minority section on census.)	25	0.58%	10	0.23%	0	0%	10	0.25%	0	0%	0	0%	—N/a	—N/a	—N/a	—N/a	—N/a	—N/a
Total responses	4,285	98.6%	4,305	97.09%	4,370	97.54%	4,060	99.9%	4,325	98.52%	4,360	99.07%	3,985	99.06%	3,450	98.43%	2,630	113.22%
Total population	4,346	100%	4,434	100%	4,480	100%	4,064	100%	4,390	100%	4,401	100%	4,023	100%	3,505	100%	2,323	100%
Note: Totals greater than 100% due to multiple origin responses.

=== Religion ===
According to the 2021 census, religious groups in Vanderhoof included:

- Irreligion (2,080 persons or 48.5%)
- Christianity (2,065 persons or 48.2%)
- Sikhism (40 persons or 0.9%)
- Judaism (25 persons or 0.6%)
- Buddhism (15 persons or 0.4%)
- Hinduism (15 persons or 0.4%)
- Islam (15 persons or 0.4%)
- Indigenous Spirituality (10 persons or 0.2%)

== Wildlife ==
Vanderhoof is known for its bird sanctuary along the Nechako River. Many Canada geese, swans, and other migratory birds pass through Vanderhoof during their annual migrations. The Nechako is home to a number of fish species, including salmon and the endangered Nechako white sturgeon. Many hunters come to Vanderhoof in search of bear, moose, deer, cougar and elk.

== Schools ==
School District 91 operates four elementary schools in Vanderhoof, each offering kindergarten through grade 6, and two secondary schools with the main school offering grades 7 to 12 and the smaller alternate high school offering grades 9 to 12. Vanderhoof also has one independent Christian School offering kindergarten to grade 12.
École W.L. McLeod Elementary School (dual-track French immersion)
Evelyn Dickson Elementary School
Mapes Elementary School
Nechako Valley Secondary School
Northside Christian School
Sinkut View Elementary School
Valhalla High School

The virtual EBUS Academy is also headquartered in Vanderhoof.

== Culture and recreation ==
- Nechako Valley Exhibition Grounds- home of the Fall Fair (August), 2 riding arenas, and agricultural show facilities
- Vanderhoof Community Museum and Tourism Centre
- Vanderhoof Airport – 5,018-foot paved runway and two grass runways (5,200 feet and 3,200 feet)
- Vanderhoof Aquatic Centre – 6-lane 25m lap pool, climbing wall, 30-person hot tub, sauna, and 1500 sq. foot leisure pool
- Vanderhoof Skateboard Park
- Grand Reo Theatre – a restored 175-seat movie theatre
- Omineca Golf Course – par 72, 18 holes
- Disc Golf Course
- Vanderhoof Arena – indoor skating rink in the winter, home to Figure Skating Club, Speed Skating Club, Minor Hockey Club, other adult hockey recreation leagues, and a community centre hosting various events in the summer
- Vanderhoof Curling Club
- Riverside Park & Campground – birdwatching tower, playground, beach volleyball, picnic shelter, walking trails
- Ferland Park – playground, waterpark
- Bradley Park, Leiding Park, Vanderview Park –playgrounds
- Community Garden – greenhouse, raised beds, in-ground plots, public washroom
- Rip n' The North Bike Park – mountain bike trails
- Moore's Motocross Track – dirt bike track
- Community trail system
- Nechako White Sturgeon Conservation Centre – identifying, maintaining and potentially restoring critical sturgeon habitat in the Nechako River
- Nechako Valley Sporting Association – archery, hand gun range, fishing and hunting, cross-country skiing, trap shooting, Wilderness Watch
- Omineca Express – local weekly newspaper published Thursdays
- CIAM FM, "The Light 98.5 FM" – community radio station, also a rebroadcaster for CIAM radio network
- CBC Radio 1, 91.5 FM
- Real Country, 910 AM
- Vanderhoof Public Library
- Community Bus – free community transportation service (12-passenger capacity with 2 wheelchair positions)

=== Telegraph Trail ===
A telegraph line, set up in the 1890s for communication with the Klondike Gold Rush gold fields, was abandoned in the 1930s and later converted into a series of walking trails. A 10 km trail connects Hogsback Lake (near Vanderhoof) to Blackwater Road.

=== Community events ===
- Wild Goose Chase: held the first Sunday in May, this community 8 km, 5 km, and 3.5 km Fun Run brings out hundreds of participants and volunteers.
- Vanderhoof Chamber of Commerce Biennial Trade Show, scheduled in May on the "odd numbered" years.
- BC Rodeo – held in April
- Stoney Creek Elders Fishing Derby – May
- Hooterville Hoot: an annual classic car show, held in early June.
- Concert In The Park: July – Local talent performs for an afternoon and evening filled with great entertainment.
- Canada Day Celebration: – July 1
- Vanderhoof Annual Pride Festival - Taking place every summer, 2SLGBTQ+ citizens and supporters come together to celebrate community, inclusivity, and to honour those who have suffered in the fight for human rights. Drag performances, vendors, trivia, and activity booths!
- Vanderhoof Farmers' Market: fresh locally grown produce, organic meat products, preserves, crafted goods and much more. Markets run Thursdays from June to September.
- Vanderhoof International Air show: Taking place biennially in August – showcasing many skilled pilots and their aircraft, as well as several static displays.
- Nechako Valley Exhibition: held the third weekend in August. A true country fair that is fun for the whole family.
- Recreation/Leisure Fair: held in early September to introduce clubs and recreational opportunities to the community.
- The Great Pumpkin Walk: Held annually, October 31 – With hand-carved pumpkins and "trick-or-treating" in the park, attended by hundreds of residents—a safe and convenient place for families to spend Halloween night. Followed by a fireworks display that lights up the entire Nechako River Valley.
- Parade of Lights and Merry Madness: Held the first Saturday in December, this kicks off the Christmas time retail season with the light parade and crazy sales at many retail stores.

== Climate ==
Vanderhoof has a humid continental climate (Köppen Dfb) with mild summers and cold winters.

Climate data for Vanderhoof, 1981–2010 normals, extremes 1916–present
Month	Jan	Feb	Mar	Apr	May	Jun	Jul	Aug	Sep	Oct	Nov	Dec	Year
Record high °C (°F)	13.0 (55.4)	16.7 (62.1)	20.0 (68.0)	28.9 (84.0)	36.0 (96.8)	33.9 (93.0)	35.0 (95.0)	35.5 (95.9)	33.0 (91.4)	28.0 (82.4)	17.5 (63.5)	12.5 (54.5)	36.0 (96.8)
Mean daily maximum °C (°F)	−4.5 (23.9)	−0.1 (31.8)	5.9 (42.6)	12.4 (54.3)	17.8 (64.0)	21.3 (70.3)	23.5 (74.3)	23.3 (73.9)	17.9 (64.2)	10.3 (50.5)	0.9 (33.6)	−4.1 (24.6)	10.4 (50.7)
Daily mean °C (°F)	−9.0 (15.8)	−5.5 (22.1)	−0.2 (31.6)	5.6 (42.1)	10.7 (51.3)	14.4 (57.9)	16.3 (61.3)	15.9 (60.6)	11.0 (51.8)	5.0 (41.0)	−2.8 (27.0)	−8.1 (17.4)	4.4 (39.9)
Mean daily minimum °C (°F)	−13.3 (8.1)	−10.9 (12.4)	−6.3 (20.7)	−1.3 (29.7)	3.5 (38.3)	7.4 (45.3)	9.1 (48.4)	8.3 (46.9)	4.1 (39.4)	−0.3 (31.5)	−6.5 (20.3)	−12.1 (10.2)	−1.5 (29.3)
Record low °C (°F)	−51.7 (−61.1)	−51.1 (−60.0)	−42.8 (−45.0)	−29.4 (−20.9)	−9.4 (15.1)	−6.7 (19.9)	−3.3 (26.1)	−5.0 (23.0)	−16.7 (1.9)	−28.0 (−18.4)	−42.2 (−44.0)	−50.6 (−59.1)	−51.7 (−61.1)
Average precipitation mm (inches)	44.4 (1.75)	26.6 (1.05)	24.4 (0.96)	25.4 (1.00)	34.7 (1.37)	57.0 (2.24)	52.4 (2.06)	43.1 (1.70)	44.3 (1.74)	50.8 (2.00)	45.1 (1.78)	41.3 (1.63)	489.2 (19.26)
Average rainfall mm (inches)	6.6 (0.26)	5.4 (0.21)	7.1 (0.28)	19.4 (0.76)	34.2 (1.35)	56.8 (2.24)	52.3 (2.06)	43.1 (1.70)	44.0 (1.73)	43.3 (1.70)	16.1 (0.63)	3.8 (0.15)	332.0 (13.07)
Average snowfall cm (inches)	37.8 (14.9)	21.3 (8.4)	17.3 (6.8)	6.0 (2.4)	0.5 (0.2)	0.2 (0.1)	0.0 (0.0)	0.0 (0.0)	0.2 (0.1)	7.5 (3.0)	29.0 (11.4)	37.5 (14.8)	157.2 (61.9)
Average precipitation days (≥ 0.2 mm)	14.1	9.5	10.0	9.7	12.6	14.1	13.8	12.5	13.0	16.3	14.5	11.8	152.1
Average rainy days (≥ 0.2 mm)	2.9	2.8	5.0	8.0	12.5	14.1	13.8	12.5	12.9	14.7	6.4	2.0	107.7
Average snowy days (≥ 0.2 cm)	12.1	7.2	6.0	2.5	0.4	0.0	0.0	0.0	0.2	2.7	10.1	10.3	51.4
Source: Environment Canada

== See also ==
- Saik'uz First Nation
