= François Lake, British Columbia =

Settlement in British Columbia, Canada

Coordinates: 54°03′00″N 125°45′00″W

Location of Francois Lake in British Columbia

François Lake is an unincorporated settlement in the Nechako Country of the Central Interior of British Columbia. It is located midway along the north shore of the lake of the same name, which is to the south of the town of Burns Lake

== See also ==
- List of communities in British Columbia
