= Burns Lake =

- Village
- The Corporation of the Village of Burns Lake
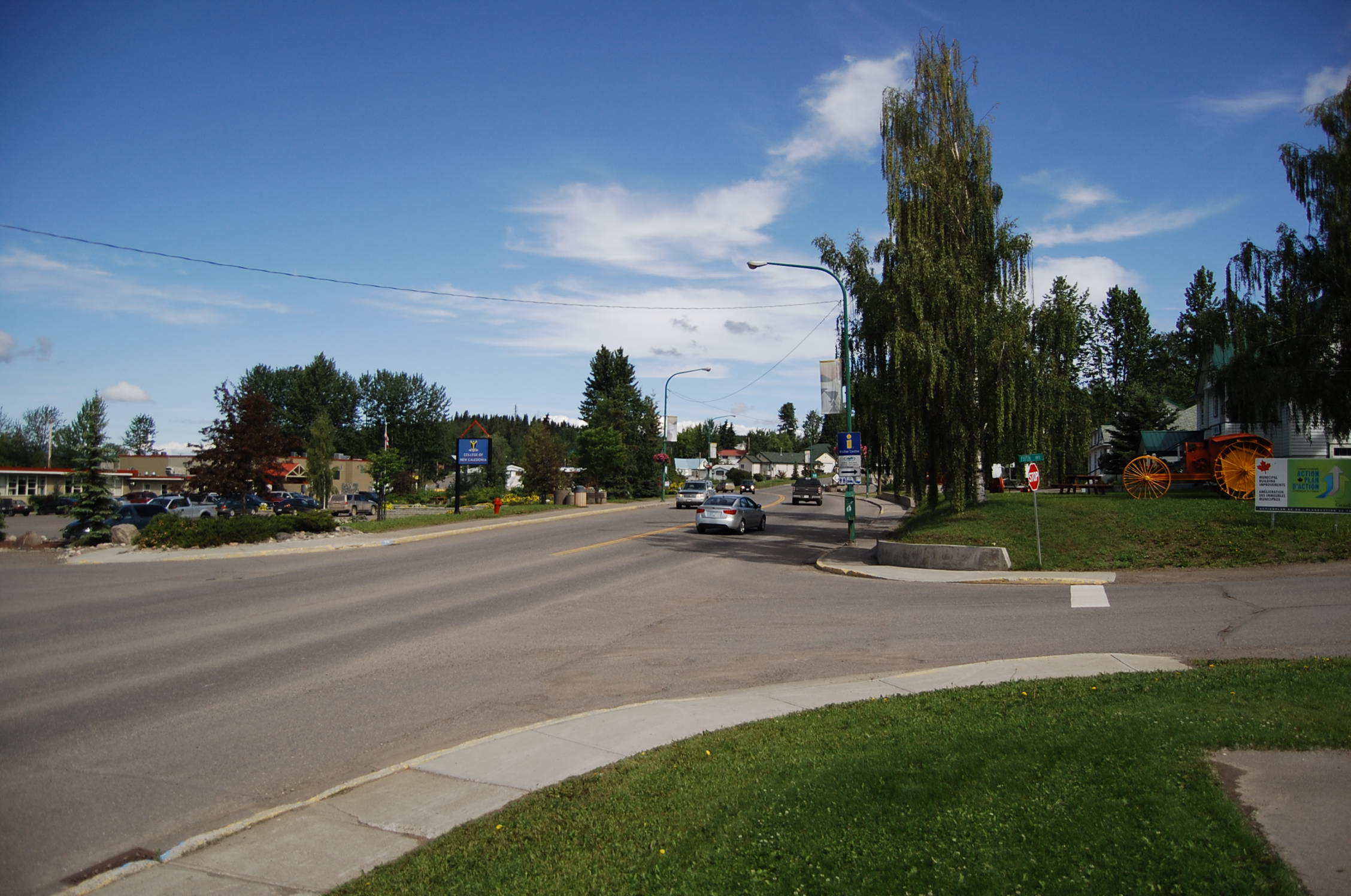
- Downtown 2011

- Location of Burns Lake in British Columbia
- Coordinates: 54°13′45″N 125°45′45″W
- Country: Canada
- Province: British Columbia
- Region: Nechako Country
- Regional district: Bulkley-Nechako
- Incorporated: 1923

Government
  - Type: Municipal
  - Governing body: Burns Lake Village Council
  - Mayor: Henry Wiebe
  - Councillors: Darrell Hill; Kevin White; Charlie Rensby; Kristy Bjarnson

Area
  - Total: 6.59 km^{2} (2.54 sq mi)
  - Land: 6.59 km^{2} (2.54 sq mi)
  - Water: 0.00 km^{2} (0 sq mi)
- Elevation: 720 m (2,360 ft)

Population (2021)
  - Total: 1,659
  - Density: 269.8/km^{2} (699/sq mi)
- Time zone: UTC−07:00 (PT)
- Postal code: V0J 1E0 or V0J 1E1
- Area code: 250
- Highway: British Columbia Highway 16
- Waterways: Burns Lake
- Website: www.burnslake.ca

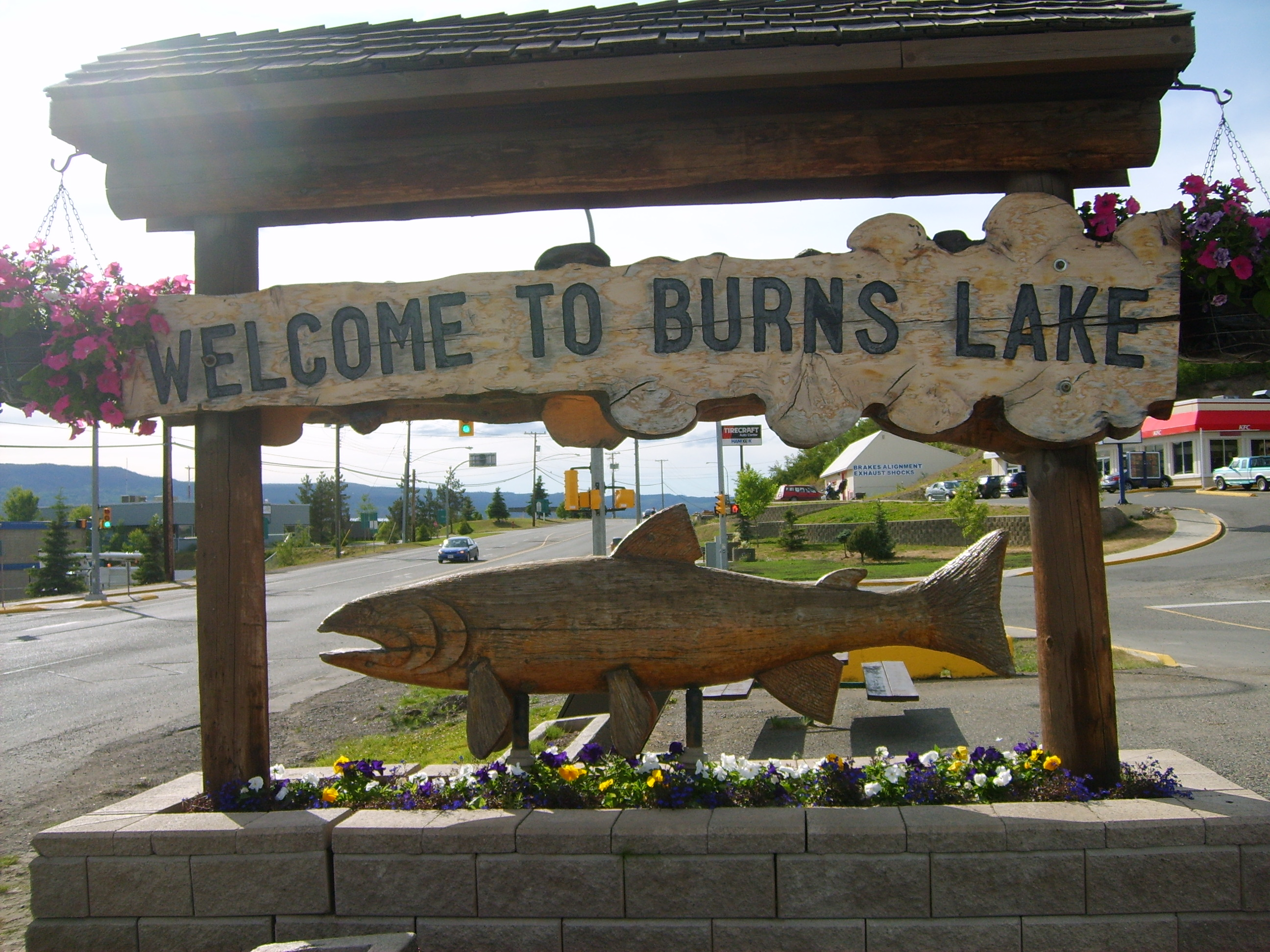
Burns Lake's welcome sign

Burns Lake is a rural village in the north-western-central interior of British Columbia, Canada, incorporated in 1923. The village had a population of 1,659 as of the 2021 Census.

The village is known for its rich First Nations heritage, and for its network of mountain biking trails, which have received acclaim by becoming Canada's first IMBA Ride Centre. In winter, cross country skiing trails and snowmobile wilderness trails are created. Burns Lake is located in the midst of a large networks of lakes called the Lakes District, with fishing and hunting year round, and water activities in the summer months.

There are two First Nations reserves that are part of the town, and another four nearby, making it one of the few communities in the province that have almost equal populations of persons of native or European descent. Local nations include Wetʼsuwetʼen First Nation, Lake Babine Nation, Cheslatta Carrier Nation, Ts'il Kaz Koh First Nation, Skin Tyee First Nation and Nee-Tahi-Buhn Band.

The town serves as a hub for the local logging, saw-milling, mining and tourist industries. It also serves as the main commercial centre for the surrounding area including François Lake, Colleymount, Grassy Plains, Rose Lake, Topley, and Granisle. There are three pubs, several cafes and restaurants a selection of stores, hotels and motels, and services including a library and a hospital. It is also the location of the head offices of the Regional District of Bulkley-Nechako.

== History ==
Burns Lake's first inhabitants were the Dakelh (once known colonially as Carrier, an identification term never self-selected by any of the collection of cultures to which it was applied) and Wet'suwet'en First Nations communities that spanned much of the Lakes District and beyond.

Burns Lake, as pertains to the municipality of today, began as a small rest stop for travellers on their way to the Yukon Gold Rush. Many of these travellers spotted opportunity in the rich forestry, fur, and mining opportunities in Burns Lake and the surrounding area.

Burns Lake acquired its name after Michael Byrnes, who was an explorer for the Collins Overland Telegraph scheme. Byrnes passed Burns lake in about 1866 while surveying a route from Fort Fraser to Hagwilget. Recent research indicates that Byrnes was also a miner during the Cariboo Gold Rush and had staked a claim on William's Creek earlier, in 1861. On the 1866 trail map of the area, the name 'Byrnes' Lake appears; after 1876 however, the maps indicate it as Burns Lake.

Bob Gerow, one of the main founders of Burns Lake, entered into partnership with Jack Seely and Howard Laidlaw to create Burns Lake Trading Company. Together, they built a store/hotel and a sawmill on Gerow Island, which would become the hub of trade for the surrounding area. The Village was incorporated on December 6, 1923. The first Mayor was G. M Gerow.

The first newspaper in Burns Lake was called the Observer, published and edited by Sidney Godwin. In the late 1950s, another newspaper, also called the Observer, was operated by Ralph Vipond. It closed in 1961.

The town continued to grow throughout the 20th century, despite damage suffered in an earthquake in August 1963. Its current industries have become forestry and tourism, though many workers commute to jobs in the mining industry.

Burns Lake received nationwide attention on January 20, 2012, when a fatal explosion destroyed Babine Forest Products, a wood mill which was one of the town's primary employers.

The village of Burns Lake is infamous within the trucking and commercial transportation industries for its narrow, twisting main road which made the transportation of large loads to adjacent communities difficult at times. However, the serpentine route also displays the town's business district while many other highway communities have their downtowns bypassed.

A number of historic buildings still stand including:

=== The Old Hospital ===
First built in 1931 by the Women's Missionary Society of the United Church of Canada. Once the largest and finest public buildings between Prince George and Prince Rupert, it was famous for its fine gardens. It was later occupied by a senior citizens apartment complex, then declared a heritage building in 1982 and redeveloped as an office building by its owner, the Burns Lake Native Development Corporation.

=== The Bucket of Blood ===
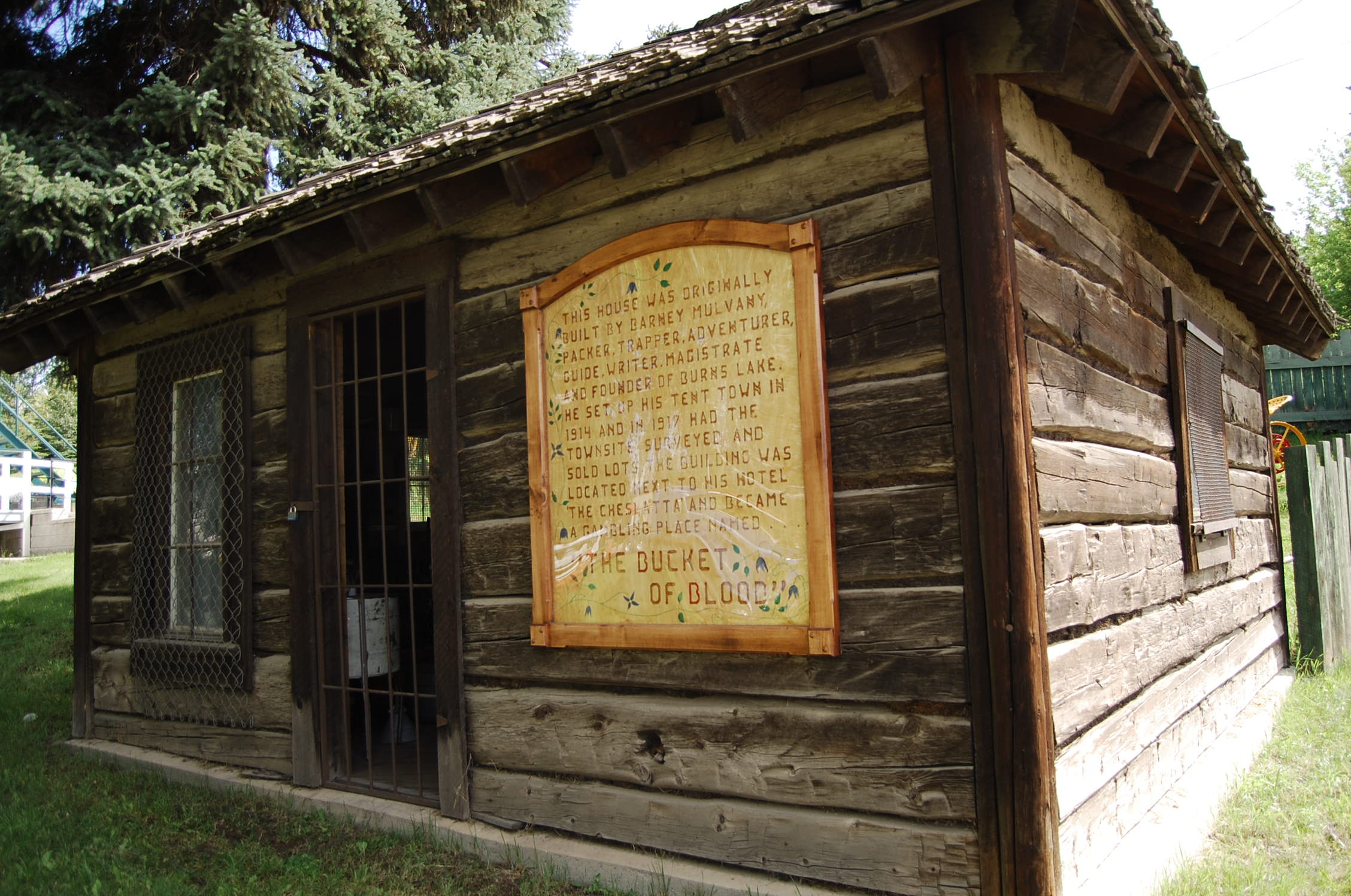
Bucket of Blood

Located adjacent to the Lakes District Museum, this square-cut log building is a former fur trade post which later became a gambling den. Due to the nature of gambling, fights broke out in the building, earning its name. It now contains a display of historical artifacts from the life of Barney Mulvaney, one of the founders of Burns Lake.

== Geography ==
=== Climate ===
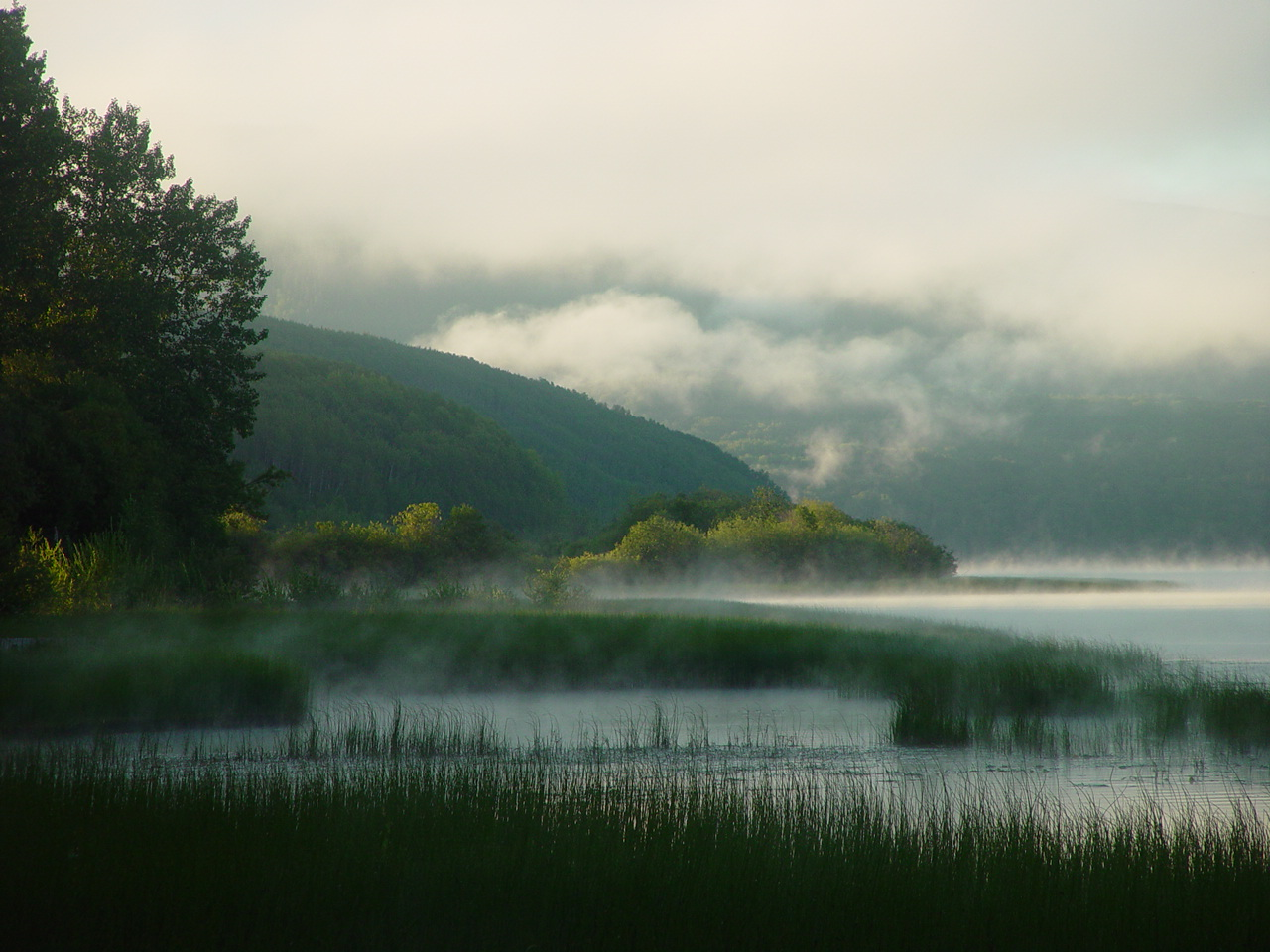
Early morning mist on Burns Lake

Burns Lake has a subarctic climate (Dfc,) although it is on the borderline of a humid continental climate. It has short warm summers and cold winters. Average winter snowfall is approximately 190 cm (74.8 in).

In June 1982 Burns Lake recorded 376.5 hours of sunshine. This is most sunshine ever recorded in British Columbia during the month of June.

Climate data for Burns Lake
Month	Jan	Feb	Mar	Apr	May	Jun	Jul	Aug	Sep	Oct	Nov	Dec	Year
Record high humidex	11.0	10.0	14.4	24.5	37.6	34.4	35.9	37.4	29.5	25.0	14.3	10.8	37.6
Record high °C (°F)	11.0 (51.8)	10.3 (50.5)	15.4 (59.7)	27.3 (81.1)	34.0 (93.2)	33.3 (91.9)	32.8 (91.0)	33.4 (92.1)	30.9 (87.6)	25.6 (78.1)	14.5 (58.1)	11.3 (52.3)	34.0 (93.2)
Mean daily maximum °C (°F)	−5.7 (21.7)	−1.5 (29.3)	4.4 (39.9)	9.8 (49.6)	14.6 (58.3)	18.0 (64.4)	21.0 (69.8)	20.7 (69.3)	16.1 (61.0)	9.5 (49.1)	0.2 (32.4)	−5.3 (22.5)	8.5 (47.3)
Daily mean °C (°F)	−10.5 (13.1)	−7.4 (18.7)	−2.0 (28.4)	3.5 (38.3)	8.3 (46.9)	11.7 (53.1)	14.3 (57.7)	13.9 (57.0)	9.9 (49.8)	4.9 (40.8)	−3.2 (26.2)	−9.7 (14.5)	2.8 (37.0)
Mean daily minimum °C (°F)	−15.3 (4.5)	−13.3 (8.1)	−8.4 (16.9)	−2.9 (26.8)	2.0 (35.6)	5.4 (41.7)	7.6 (45.7)	7.1 (44.8)	3.7 (38.7)	0.2 (32.4)	−6.6 (20.1)	−14.1 (6.6)	−2.9 (26.8)
Record low °C (°F)	−46.7 (−52.1)	−40.0 (−40.0)	−40.0 (−40.0)	−18.9 (−2.0)	−7.0 (19.4)	−2.2 (28.0)	−0.6 (30.9)	−0.8 (30.6)	−8.9 (16.0)	−21.5 (−6.7)	−37.3 (−35.1)	−42.7 (−44.9)	−46.7 (−52.1)
Average precipitation mm (inches)	41.1 (1.62)	27.2 (1.07)	25.1 (0.99)	16.7 (0.66)	35.1 (1.38)	51.2 (2.02)	43.3 (1.70)	42.8 (1.69)	41.1 (1.62)	44.6 (1.76)	48.2 (1.90)	44.1 (1.74)	460.8 (18.14)
Average rainfall mm (inches)	5.1 (0.20)	2.3 (0.09)	3.3 (0.13)	10.4 (0.41)	33.9 (1.33)	51.2 (2.02)	43.3 (1.70)	42.8 (1.69)	40.5 (1.59)	37.7 (1.48)	16.9 (0.67)	4.0 (0.16)	291.3 (11.47)
Average snowfall cm (inches)	42.3 (16.7)	29.0 (11.4)	23.2 (9.1)	6.0 (2.4)	1.2 (0.5)	0.0 (0.0)	0.0 (0.0)	0.0 (0.0)	0.7 (0.3)	7.2 (2.8)	34.4 (13.5)	45.8 (18.0)	189.8 (74.7)
Average precipitation days (≥ 0.2 mm)	13.6	11.1	11.0	8.0	12.6	14.4	12.3	12.0	12.5	13.8	13.9	13.2	148.1
Mean monthly sunshine hours	57.0	94.1	138.7	190.4	233.8	242.7	267.5	242.3	155.1	105.7	52.0	43.9	1,823.2
Source: Environment Canada

== Demographics ==
In the 2021 Census of Population conducted by Statistics Canada, Burns Lake had a population of 1,659 living in 689 of its 765 total private dwellings, a change of −6.7% from its 2016 population of 1,779. With a land area of 6.54 km^{2} (2.53 sq mi), it had a population density of 253.7/km^{2} (657.0/sq mi) in 2021.

=== Religion ===
According to the 2021 census, religious groups in Burns Lake included:

- Irreligion (790 persons or 51.3%)
- Christianity (720 persons or 46.8%)
- Other (10 persons or 1.3%)

== Transportation ==
Burns Lake is located on Highway 16. Major commercial airlines fly into Smithers Airport, which is approximately 150 km (93 mi) west of Burns Lake, as well as Prince George Airport which is approximately 230 km (140 mi) east of Burns Lake.

Via Rail's Jasper–Prince Rupert train calls at the Burns Lake station several times per week.

BC Bus has the bus service through the area twice a week. Alternatively, there is a BC Transit bus which operated between Prince George and Smithers throughout the week.

A free ferry is available to cross Francois Lake which is directly south of Burns Lake. The ferry is used frequently to get to Grassy Plains.

== Education ==
- Lakes District Secondary School - Public High school Grades 8-12
- Murial Mould Learning Centre - Public Youth Education Centre
- William Konkin Elementary School - Public Elementary School Grades K-7
- Decker Lake Elementary School - Public Elementary School Grades K-7
- Grassy Plains Elementary School - Public Elementary School Grades K-10
- Francois Lake Elementary Secondary School - Public Elementary/Secondary School K-7
- College of New Caledonia - Public Adult Learning facility

== Culture ==
Burns Lake is surrounded by a rich First Nations culture. There are six First Nations Groups in the area:

- Ts'il Kaz Koh First Nation (Burns Lake Band)
- Cheslatta Carrier Nation
- Lake Babine Nation
- Nee-Tahi-Buhn Band
- Skin Tyee First Nation
- Wet'suwet'en First Nation

The Lakes District Arts Council holds several arts events every year, bringing in acts from all over the globe with a variety of different types of performances including, music, theatre, and a variety of other performances.

Burns Lake hosts annual Performing Arts and Alternative Arts Festivals, drawing talent and audiences from across the region. Burns Lake also hosts an annual Aboriginal Day Celebration (the second largest in the province) which draws people from around the region and an annual Canada Day Celebration, each of which have celebratory parades.

== Recreation ==
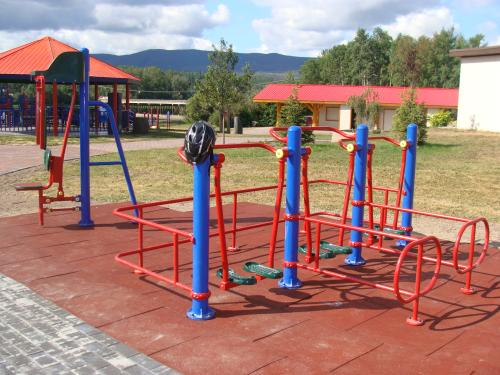
Free exercise equipment in Spirit Square

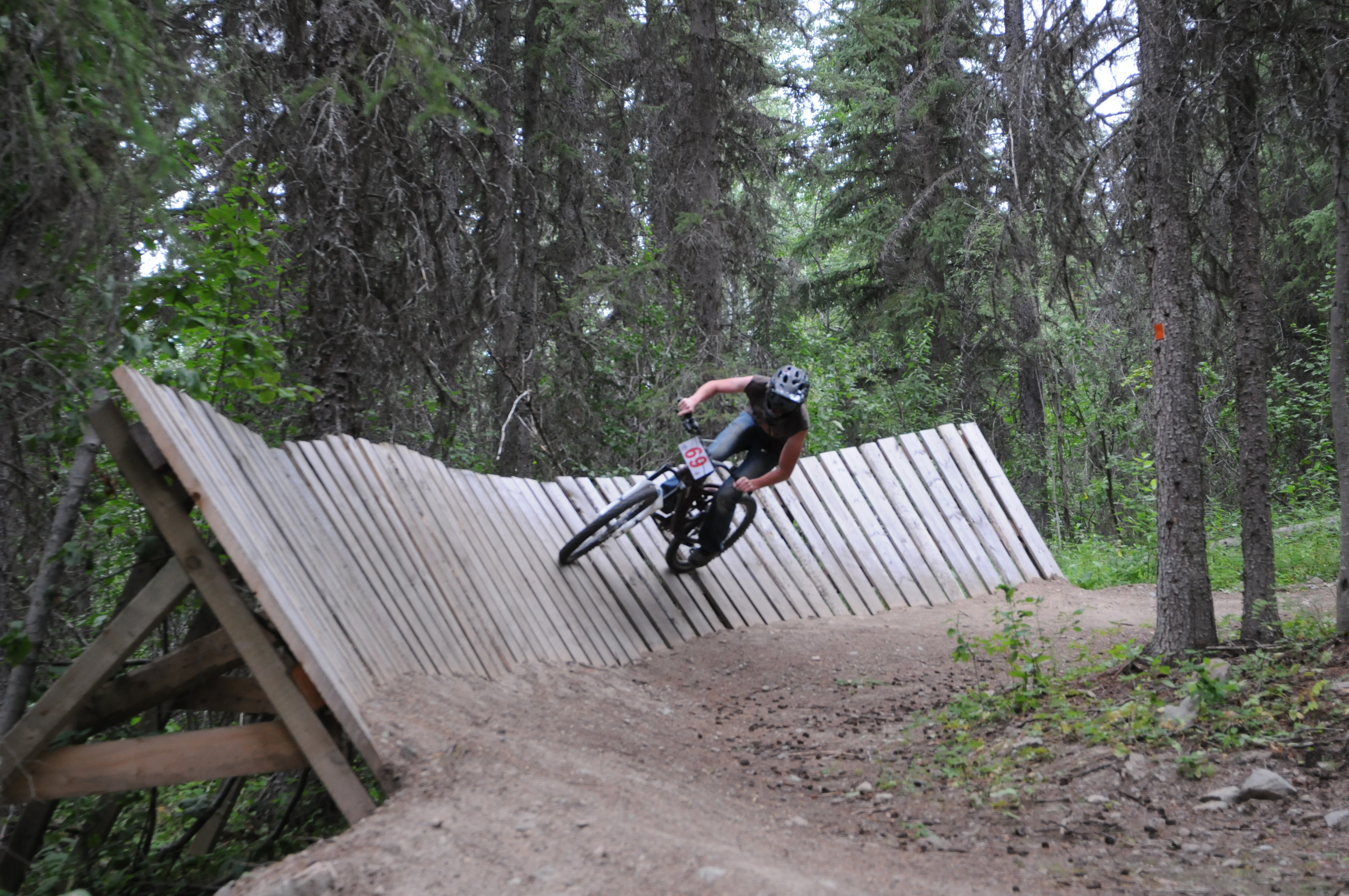
One of the many trails in Burns Lake

Burns Lake has gained world renown from the International Mountain Biking Association for its network of trails on Boer Mountain. The trails, maintained by a volunteer group called the Burns Lake Mountain Biking Association, includes 23 km (14 mi) of downhill and 40 km (25 mi) of cross country trails. The trails continue to draw mountain bikers from all over the world and are expanding every season. In the winter months cross country skiing is popular at the Omineca Ski Club. Its facilities have hosted several national championships. The facilities include 25 km of groomed trails, four km of which are lit for nighttime skiing. There is also a facility for biathlon skiing.

In 2014 The Village of Burns Lake completed work on the Lakeside Multiplex and renovations to the Tom Forsyth Memorial Arena. This facility includes a hockey rink, curling rink, rock climbing gym, a squash/racquetball court, a fitness facility, and multi-use rooms. The facility is located on Spirit Square, a large outdoor park with a playground, a beach, a walking path, outdoor fitness equipment, two tennis courts, and a skateboard park.

The 1.9 kilometre Opal Bed Trail leads to an active rock hounding destination, where users can look for precious minerals.

Burns Lake is considered to be the gateway to Tweedsmuir North Provincial Park and Protected Area. (The North Park is a wilderness area with no services or supplies; it cannot be accessed by road.) Fly-in tours for sightseeing, hunting and fishing are offered by local outfitters.

== Notable residents ==
- Luke Everett Strimbold - Youngest mayor in British Columbia history.
- Emily Dickson - Biathlete, competed at the 2022 Winter Olympics in Beijing
- Esther Miller - Cross-country skier, competed at the 1976 Winter Olympics and the 1980 Winter Olympics
- Russell Brown - Former justice of the Supreme Court of Canada and Alberta Court of Appeal.
