= List of caves in Canada =

This is an incomplete list of caves in Canada. Most notable caves are in western Canada and in parts of southern Ontario where limestone predominates.

Name	Image	Province	Entrance elevation (m)	Depth (m)	Length (m)	Remarks
Arctomys Cave		British Columbia		536	3,496	Located in Mount Robson Provincial Park
ARGO Cave		British Columbia		426	25,450	Canada's longest cave. Located on ʼNa̱mǥis Nation lands on the west coast of Vancouver Island.
Artlish River Cave		British Columbia			396	Located in Artlish Caves Provincial Park
Bisaro Anima		British Columbia		670	5,300	Discovered in 2012 on a high plateau of Mount Bisaro near Fernie. Extreme depth reached in a sump in late 2017.
The Black Hole		British Columbia			740	Located in Artlish Caves Provincial Park
Bluefish Caves		Yukon				Located near Old Crow
Bocock Peak Caves		British Columbia				Located in Bocock Peak Provincial Park
Grotte de Boischatel		Quebec			2,800	Located above Montmorency Falls near Québec (the city). Longest cave in Quebec.
Bonnechere Caves		Ontario				Located in Eganville
Booming Ice Chasm		Alberta		140	704	Located near Crowsnest Pass
Cadomin Cave		Alberta	1,891	220	2,791	Located near Cadomin. Closed in 2010 due to an outbreak of white nose syndrome.
Canyon Creek Ice Cave		Alberta	1,769	+89.4	727.12	Located near the town of Bragg Creek. Impassable beyond the first 150m since 1980, due to ice buildup.
Castleguard Cave		Alberta	2,016	384	20,357	Located in Banff National Park. Second-longest cave in Canada. The cave entrance is gated and requires permission from Parks Canada to enter.
Cave and Basin		Alberta	1,403			Located in the town of Banff. The cave consists of a tunnel blasted through to a natural cavern containing hot springs. Has an entry fee.
Cave Falls		Ontario				Located in Hamilton
Charlie Lake Cave		British Columbia				An archaeologically significant cave located near Charlie Lake
Chipmunk Caves		British Columbia				Located in the Chilliwack River valley near Ford Mountain Correctional Centre
Close To The Edge		British Columbia	700	475	967	Located in Close To The Edge Provincial Park
Cody Caves		British Columbia			800	Located in Cody Caves Provincial Park. Access is by guided tour only.
Devil's Bath		British Columbia	90	44		Large cenote located 13.5 km southeast of Port Alice near Kathleen Lake
Duncan Crevice Caves		Ontario				Located in Beaver Valley
Eramosa Karst		Ontario				Located in Hamilton
Eternal Fountain		British Columbia				A waterfall emptying into a sinkhole near Port McNeill
Fairy Hole		Nova Scotia				A sea cave reputedly linked to various legends of the Mi'kmaq Nation
Fang Cave		British Columbia				Located in Evanoff Provincial Park
Gargantua Cave		Alberta; British Columbia	2,501	286	6,001	Located near Crowsnest Pass. Contains the largest and highest elevation natural cavern in Canada.
Hayes Cave		Nova Scotia			400	Located near Maple Grove
Hole in the Wall		Alberta	2,013		30	A prominent feature on the side of Mount Cory. Visible from the Trans-Canada Highway about 14 km west of the town of Banff.
Homesite Creek Caves		British Columbia				Located near Halfmoon Bay
Hoodoo Cave		Alberta		220		Located near Nordegg
Horne Lake cave complex		British Columbia				Located in Horne Lake Caves Provincial Park
Horseshoe Falls grotto		Ontario			46	A large manmade grotto behind Horseshoe Falls of Niagara Falls
Kitt's Cave		New Brunswick		8	141	Located near Hammondvale
Limestone deposits		Manitoba				Located near Lake Winnipeg
Little Huson Cave complex		British Columbia				Located in Little Huson Cave Regional Park
Nakimu Caves		British Columbia				Located in Glacier National Park
Plateau Mountain Ice Cave		Alberta	2,226		90	Located in Plateau Mountain Ecological Reserve. Closed to the public in the early 1970s.
Raspberry Rising		British Columbia		220	975	Located beneath Mount Tupper in Glacier National Park. Still being explored, its full extents are yet to be determined.
Rat's Nest Cave		Alberta	1,450	245	4,003	Located beneath Grotto Mountain near Exshaw. Access is by guided tour only.
Saint-Alban caves		Quebec				Located in Saint-Alban
Saint-Leonard Cavern		Quebec			250	Located in Saint-Léonard. Original cave is 35 metres long with a depth of 8 metres; a second 250-metre cave was discovered in 2017.
Sarlacc's Pit cave		British Columbia		+130	+2,000	Discovered in 2018 within Wells Gray Provincial Park. Not yet accurately measured. The largest known cave of its type. Given the informal name of "Sarlacc's Pit".
Scenic Caves		Ontario				Located near Collingwood
Skaha North Cave		British Columbia		40	300	Located approximately 5 km south of north end of Skaha and 3 km up from Skaha lake
Skaha South Cave		British Columbia		30	150	Located approximately 2 km south of Skaha North Cave
Slesse Creek caves		British Columbia				Located near Slesse Creek
Small River Caves complex		British Columbia				Located in Small River Caves Provincial Park.
Stone Corral Caves		British Columbia				Located in Monkman Provincial Park
Thanksgiving Cave		British Columbia		479	8,386	Located near Tahsis. A through passage was discovered in September 2017.
Trou de la Fée		Quebec				Located in Desbiens
Trou du Diable		Quebec			980	Located in Saint-Casimir. Second longest cave in Quebec.
Trou du Perdus		Quebec				Located in Saint-Michel-du-Squatec
Underground Lake		New Brunswick		13.1	141	A gypsum cave located in the community of Demoiselle Creek
Valdes Island cave		British Columbia				Located on Valdes Island
Vanishing River/Reappearing River		British Columbia				Located southeast of Port Alice near Kathleen Lake
Wapiabi Cave		Alberta		152	540	Located near Nordegg
Warsaw Caves		Ontario				Located in Douro-Dummer Township near Warsaw
Weymer Creek caves complex		British Columbia				Located in Weymer Creek Provincial Park. Caving is strongly discouraged until a park management plan is completed.
Hell Holes Caves		Ontario				Located in Lennox and Addington County near Centreville

== See also ==
- List of caves
- Speleology
