= Garg (surname) =

Garg is an Indian surname. Notable people with the surname include:

- Alice Garg (born 1942), Indian educator, activist and founder of NGO BAl Rashmi society
- Ankit Garg, Indian police superintendent
- Anu Garg (born 1967), American author and speaker
- Balwant Gargi (1916–2003), Punjabi-language writer, theater director, and academic, who used the name Gargi as a self-adopted variation of Garg
- Mridula Garg (born 1938), Indian writer
- Neil Garg, American chemist
- Pushpendra Kumar Garg (born 1963), Indian sportsperson in yachting
- Rajinder Garg (born 1966), Indian politician
- Ramesh Garg, dean of student and alumni affairs in IIT Ropar
- Sugandha Garg (born 1982), Indian film actress, singer and television host
- V. K. Garg, Indian education administrator working as Dean in CUPB
- Vishal Garg, Indian researcher in IT in building science
- Vishal Garg (businessman), Indian-American entrepreneur
- Zarna Garg (born 1975), Indian American stand-up comedian and screenwriter
- Zubeen Garg (1972–2025), Indian singer, music director, composer, songwriter and actor

== See also ==
- The Garg (disambiguation)
- Gargantua (disambiguation)
