= Gargantua (disambiguation) =

Gargantua is a book by the French author François Rabelais.

Gargantua may also refer to:

- Gargantua (album), a 2013 studio album by Ash Grunwald
- Gargantua (cave), a cave in Western Canada
- Gargantua (gorilla) (1929 – 1949), gorilla in the Ringling Brothers Circus
- Gargantua (comics), a size-changing supervillain from Marvel Comics
- Gargantua River, a river in Ontario, Canada
- Gargantua (card game), a solitaire card game
- The Gargantuas, two giant humanoid monsters from the 1966 Japanese film The War of the Gargantuas
- Gargantua (film), a 1998 made-for-television film
- Gargantua (bryozoan), an extinct genus of cheilostome bryozoan
- Gargantua, a fictional supermassive black hole in the 2014 science fiction film Interstellar directed by Christopher Nolan

== See also ==
- Gargantuan (album), a 1993 album by Spooky
- Gargantua and Pantagruel, novels by Rabelais
