= Sarlacc Pit =

Sarlacc Pit may refer to:

- Sarlacc's Pit, the fictional home of Sarlacc in the Star Wars franchise
- Sarlacc's Pit cave, or Wells Gray Park Cave, a cave in British Columbia, Canada
