= Garg =

Garg may refer to:

- Garg (surname), an Indian surname (including a list of people with the name)
- The Garg (disambiguation), nickname for two newspapers

== See also ==
- Garga (disambiguation)
- Gargi, an ancient Indian philosopher
- Gargi (film), 2022 Indian legal drama film by Gautham Ramachandran
