= Bisaro Anima =

Cave in BC, Canada

- Location within British Columbia
- Location: Kootenay Land District; British Columbia, Canada
- Coordinates: 49°36′28″N 115°08′05″W
- Depth: 683 metres (2,241 ft)
- Discovery: 2012
- Geology: Limestone, sandstone

Bisaro Anima is a cave located on the Mount Bisaro plateau in British Columbia, Canada. It is the deepest cave in Canada.

== Etymology ==
The name "Bisaro Anima" is derived from Mount Bisaro, the plateau it is located on. The mountain itself is named after Canadian Army Private Torindo John Bisaro, an Italian-born immigrant who lived in nearby Fernie and fought for Canada in the Second World War. An infantryman, Bisaro was a member of the Royal Highland Regiment of Canada, a.k.a. "the Black Watch", and was registered as killed in action on 28 July 1944, at the age of 21. In recognition of Bisaro's Italian heritage, the second half of the name is derived from the Italian word 'anima', which translates to 'heart' or 'soul' in English.

=== Cave features ===
Most locations within the cave are named in reference to wars, particularly those fought by the Canadian Armed Forces.

The Vimy Ridge cliff is named for the Battle of Vimy Ridge, one of the most important battles in Canadian history. The Trenches are named for the military fortifications essential to trench warfare, which dominated the Western Front in the First World War.

The Rhineland is named for the Rhineland, a region of Western Germany that was the scene of a Canadian campaign in the Second World War, and the Rhine is named for the Western European river Rhine.

The Black Watch, the cave's second and deepest pitch (vertical drop), is named in reference to Torindo Bisaro's unit. Operation Mincemeat is named for a British spy operation. The Canal du Nord is named for the Battle of the Canal du Nord, which the Black Watch participated in. The Collapse of the Third Reich is named for the final days of the war in Europe, in which the German regime collapsed as Allied forces converged on their territory. Did Nazi That Coming is named in reference to a pun in which "Nazi" stands in for "not see", reflecting its surprise discovery. Dieppe, the lake at the bottom of the cave, was named by expedition leader Kathleen Graham in reference to the Dieppe Raid, the first WWII battle fought by the Black Watch and one in which "commanders were over-eager to send in troops, and underestimated the enemy". If an open-air passage is ever discovered on the far side of Dieppe, Graham has suggested it be named Juno in reference to Juno Beach where Canadian troops landed during the Normandy landings.

== Geology ==
Bisaro Anima is one of fourteen caves on the Bisaro Plateau, which is pockmarked by over 150 large holes and sinks. The surrounding area is host to a number of exceptionally deep caves, including the Heavy Breather cave system which was considered the deepest in Canada before Bisaro Anima was found to be deeper in 2018.

The cave system is primarily a mix of limestone and sandstone. In addition to sections of the cave which are filled with ice, liquid water has been found flowing both down from the entrance and through subterranean rivers. At least one natural spring on the surface, Bisaro Anima, is a product of an underground stream flowing through passages inside Bisaro Anima and then emptying out again at a lower point on the mountain, though the exact route of this stream has not been fully surveyed and may be completely flooded. Multiple phreatic tube structures have been discovered inside the cave.

Bisaro Anima currently has a confirmed depth of 683 metres (2,241 ft), though the Bisaro Plateau Caves Project estimates that the cave could be more than 1,000 metres (3,300 ft) deep in total as no expedition has yet made it to the other side of the Dieppe sump, currently considered the deepest part of the cave. As it is located within a mountain, the deepest point of Bisaro Anima is still 1,670 metres (5,480 ft) above sea level. In November 2019, cave diver Adam Walker determined that the true depth of the Dieppe sump is at least 5–10 metres (16–33 ft) deeper than the current record, and may extend even further under a ledge that no diver has explored yet. As a result, Bisaro Anima is the deepest known cave in Canada and deeper than any in the United States. Researchers have surveyed more than 6,599 metres (21,650 ft) of the main cave and its offshoots, making Bisaro Anima the 7th-largest cave in Canada by total length.

The Black Watch is the deepest single pitch (vertical drop) in the cave, measuring 105 metres (344 ft) deep, comparable to a 35-storey office building. The Bisaro Plateau Caves Project has described the interior of the cave as "passages are characterized by deep canyons, waterfalls, crawlways, uneven floors, loose rock and difficult squeezes".

The ambient temperature inside Bisaro Anima is generally 2–3 °C (36–37 °F) with close to 100% humidity, though the temperature can drop when a draft flows through the cave.

It is possible that extremophile bacteria may be present in the cave, feeding on the minerals it contains rather than biological material. Soil samples from the cave have also been studied at Thompson Rivers University for evidence of microfossils dating back to the Last Glacial Maximum.

== Layout ==
=== Entrance ===
Although many exceptionally deep caves have multiple entrances, Bisaro Anima has only one that has been confirmed. A slot entrance near the top of Mount Bisaro at an elevation of 2,350 metres (7,710 ft) above sea level, it is a small and narrow passage typically surrounded by snow which is only accessible by helicopter.

A 2018 aerial drone survey of the Bisaro Plateau and surrounding Mount Bisaro turned up over 50 unexplored caves which may connect to the Bisaro Anima system, of which seven are considered to be of particular interest to researchers. An unnamed cave adjacent to the known entrance was briefly surveyed in August 2018 and may contain a second entrance to Bisaro Anima, but researchers which have surveyed the cave have been unable to progress beyond a depth of 70 metres (230 ft) as narrow passages make any further exploration difficult. Other nearby caves, such as the Gaping Maw and Tapeworm Trench, are also considered possible secondary entrances.

A previously uncharted passage inside Bisaro Anima was discovered in August 2018 and found to extend almost to the surface, suggesting an undiscovered entrance may exist.

Trial By Fire is the first major pitch after entering the cave, consisting of a chasm 60 metres (200 ft) deep. The Black Watch, the second pitch, is located a short distance from the bottom of Trial By Fire and extends an additional 105 metres (344 ft) down. Both pitches are deep enough that an observer can not see their bottoms from the top, even with a powerful headlamp.

=== Camp 0.5 ===
After the first two major pitches, the cave gradually declines along a series of passages, the first known as the Sunday Stroll. This is where the first camp in Bisaro Anima, Camp 0.5, was established at a depth of 220 metres (720 ft). These passages lead to Double Barrel, a large aven which connects to several horizontal and vertical passages, some of which have not been explored. Those that have been surveyed include Barrel Roll, an aven; and an unnamed aven which leads to a horizontal passage known as the Tuesday Trot and, further down, the Gear Cave which leads to an area with a significant amount of ice and false floors. The ice floor in the Gear Cave, once navigated around, leads to a passage which leads under the ice and, once fully explored, may lead to the cave's elusive secondary entrance.

Double Barrel also connects to two another passages, Gardiner's Pitch and Red Barron, the latter of which gives way to the Operation Mincemeat aven. Yet another passage, Sketch City, runs between Double Barrel and a more steep drop which connects it to the midpoint of the Sunday Stroll. Deeper than Sketch City is Canal du Nord, another horizontal passage which runs parallel to the Sunday Stroll and connects to it through a steep incline.

=== Camp I ===
Beyond Canal du Nord is a narrow passage, the Squeeze, which gives way to a large aven. At the bottom of this room is the Parade Square, a relatively flat surface which leads further into the cave. Camp I is situated in an alcove, the Barracks, just above the Parade Square at 312 metres (1,024 ft) underground. A waterfall flows into the room from an unidentified source.

The Mess Hall, a vertical passage, connects the Barracks to several passages including the Traverse, a 5 metres (16 ft)-tall room which leads to the Side Pit. The Side Pit takes a steep decline to the subterranean river known as the Rhine, which flows through a passage called the Rhineland. The source of the Rhine is unknown, as spelunkers have been unable to climb the enormous mist-filled aven where the waterfall feeding it enters the caves. Alternatively, the Traverse leads into a narrow and boulder-filled series of passages known, in order, as Bloody Sunday, the Trenches, and the Collapse of the Third Reich. Another passage, Did Nazi That Coming, is accessible from the Side Pit and contains at least eight phreatic tubes leading to as-yet unexplored sections of the cave system.

=== Camp II ===
Camp II (sometimes called "Camp 1.5") is located at the end of the Collapse of the Third Reich. At a depth of 520 metres (1,710 ft), it is the deepest underground camp north of Mexico. Due to the depths of the cave and remote location, the only way of contacting the outside world is a satellite phone on the surface. Adjacent to Camp II is Vimy Ridge, a 40 metres (130 ft)-high room containing a very steep scree slope followed by several other pitches which become steeper as the depth of the cave increases. These eventually terminate at Dieppe.

=== Dieppe ===
At a depth of 655 metres (2,149 ft) the cave gives way to an underground lake known as Dieppe. A sump, Dieppe is the deepest known point in Bisaro Anima but has not been fully explored. It contains a ledge just below the record depth into the cave, and members of the Bisaro Plateau Caves Project believe that future dives may uncover additional passages and dry ground accessible through Dieppe. In addition to the ledge, an underwater tube structure was spotted during the first dive into Dieppe which may lead even deeper underwater.

Dieppe is surrounded by a sandy shore and filled with exceptionally clear blue water which maintains a temperature just above freezing. It is possible that unexplored sections of the cave, such as the phreatic tubes in Did Nazi That Coming, may allow cavers to navigate past the sump without diving.

== History ==
Bisaro Anima was first discovered and entered in 2012 by mechanical engineer Jeremy Bruns. The initial find was part of an expedition organized by the Alberta Speleological Society and led by Bruns's father, Henry Bruns. Although the cave was identified as a place of interest it was not explored extensively due to a limited amount of rock-climbing equipment, though they were able to proceed past the first two pitches and through the section now known as Sunday Stroll. Subsequent expeditions occurred in 2013, 2014, 2015, and 2016, gradually mapping out the majority of the main cave without thoroughly surveying the cave system as later expeditions would and ending when the teams ran out of rope or other materials. At this time, Bisaro Anima was estimated to be about 531 metres (1,742 ft) deep. As the first people to ever enter Bisaro Anima, some cavers accidentally triggered partial section collapses.

Over thirty people from Calgary, Edmonton, Fernie, Montreal, Vancouver, Water Valley, the United States, and the United Kingdom have entered Bisaro Anima, including:

- Mehdi Boukhal, participant in the January 2018 expedition
- Jeremy Bruns, project lead for the Bisaro Plateau Caves Project and first person to enter the cave
- Muriel Chahine, participant in the August 2018 expedition
- Peter Chiba, participant in the 2021 expedition
- Stuart de Haas, participant in the October 2017 expedition
- Jérôme Genairon, participant in the January 2018 expedition
- Stephen Gladieux, participant in the August 2018 and 2021 expeditions
- Claire Gougeon, participant in the October 2017 expedition
- Kathleen Graham, President of the Alberta Speleological Society, first person to ever dive in the cave
- Jared Habiak, participant in the January 2018 and August 2018 expeditions
- Jesse Invik, participant in the August 2018 expedition
- Matt Kennedy, participant in the 2021 expedition
- Max Koether, participant in the 2021 expedition
- Brandon Kudel, participant in the October 2017 expedition
- Jason Lavigne, participant in the January 2018 expedition
- Colin Massey, participant in the January 2018 expedition
- Luke Nelson, participant in the October 2017 expedition
- Vlad Paulik, participant in the January 2018 and August 2018 expeditions
- David Steele, caver responsible for naming "Collapse of the Third Reich"
- Christian Stenner, provincial coordinator for the Alberta/British Columbia Cave Rescue Service, participant in multiple expeditions
- Chantal Tempelman, participant in the August 2018 expedition
- Adam Walker, participant in the November 2019 expedition, second person to ever dive in the cave
- Daniel Weinberg, participant in the August 2018 expedition

=== 2017–2018 ===
In 2017, Jeremy Bruns returned to the site as the leader of the Bisaro Plateau Caves Project, a geographical survey supported by the Alberta Speleological Society and Royal Canadian Geographical Society with plans to run two expeditions in mid-October and early January. Both of these expeditions were made up entirely of volunteers. In addition to surveying the dimensions of the cave and its structures, the teams used dye tracing to study the cave's hydrology and collected DNA samples to better understand its ecology.

In the first expedition, cavers established three underground camps at varying depths as they explored Bisaro Anima for seven days, sleeping in hammocks as the uneven floor prohibited the use of conventional sleeping bags. In the second expedition, a base camp (Camp II) was established at a depth of 520 metres (1,710 ft), the deepest of any such camp in Canada or the United States.

The next expedition, which ran from 31 December 2017 to 6 January 2018, involved a team of nine people and required an additional 540 pounds (240 kg) of equipment, much of it provided by Mountain Equipment Co-op. After encountering a sump, expedition leader Kathleen Graham became the first person to cave dive in Bisaro Anima on 1 January 2018, using scuba gear to reach the current record depth into the cave at 670 metres (2,200 ft) before having to surface. Having dived 15 metres (49 ft) into Dieppe, Graham was unable to proceed further as one of her diving cylinders had been damaged during the descent, and was found to be empty upon arrival. Having reached a depth of 670 metres, Graham had proven that Bisaro Anima was the deepest cave in Canada, beating out the nearby Heavy Breather cave system (644 metres (2,113 ft) deep). By the end of the second expedition, researchers had surveyed more than 5.3 kilometres (3.3 mi) of the main cave and its offshoots, making Bisaro Anima the 9th-largest cave in Canada by total length. Much of the cave's dimensions were determined using a handheld laser rangefinder, but the underwater portions required the use of a compass and measured line.

Two more expeditions occurred in 2018, the first in August and the second in October. The August expedition consisted of 22 volunteers and at least one dog, most of whom did not enter Bisaro Anima but instead searched for additional entrances to the cave. Participants in the survey included several members of previous expeditions into the cave as well as experienced cavers from groups like the Société québécoise de spéléologie (SQS). In revisiting a passage at the cave's entrance the team discovered the ceiling to be three metres higher than previously recorded, leading to a revised maximum depth of 673 metres (2,208 ft) for Bisaro Anima.

The October expedition consisted of 15 volunteers, and again focused on surveying both the surface and the cave's interior. More than 700 metres (2,300 ft) of unexplored sections of Bisaro Anima were surveyed and yet more chambers which may lead to the surface were discovered. It led to the discovery of the Rhineland, a series of passages containing an underground river.

The January 2018 expedition was later named as the Royal Canadian Geographical Society's "Expedition of the Year" and the map compiled by the Bisaro Plateau Cave Project was deemed one of the best six maps produced by the society that year. In November 2018, the discovery of Sarlacc's Pit in Wells Gray Provincial Park led geologist David Bressan to suggest that the as-yet unexplored cave could be deeper than Bisaro Anima.

=== 2019 ===
Two more expeditions occurred in October and November 2019. The October expedition served to supply the camps in the cave with additional materials, including hundreds of metres of rope and other climbing equipment; and ensure that what equipment had been left behind in January 2018 was still in good shape.

The November 2019 expedition consisted of thirteen members. Equipment for the expedition was transported across twenty bags of 30–40 pounds (14–18 kg) apiece. On the second day, expedition leader Kathleen Graham fell while transporting lead weights and a cave pack down Vimy Ridge from Camp II, breaking her ankle. Backup diver Adam Walker performed the second-ever dive in Bisaro Anima, only going as deep as Graham reached in January 2018 before surfacing to preserve air for future dives. After returning from Bisaro Anima, Kathleen Graham underwent surgery to repair her broken ankle.

The next expedition also uncovered an enormous aven filled with mist where water fell from an unknown source which could not be reached by the team, leaving the source of the river in the Rhineland area a mystery. Another area located further up also suggested that a second connection to the surface may still remain undiscovered.

Although many sections of the cave remained uncharted, the November 2019 expedition increased the total surveyed length of the cave to 6.6 kilometres (4.1 mi), making Bisaro Anima the 7th-largest cave in Canada.

=== 2021 ===
A 2021 expedition to Bisaro Anima revised the depth of the cave once again to a record 683 metres (2,241 ft). In addition, over 1,000 metres (3,300 ft) of previously-unknown passages were discovered and surveyed.

== Hazards ==
No recreational caving is possible in Bisaro Anima. The lack of easy accessibility and available training combined with the small number of recreational cavers in Western Canada make it difficult for cavers to reach the cave without being part of an organized expedition, and entering the cave involves navigating two enormous pitches using ropes which require good physical fitness and technical expertise to descend safely. The entrance can only be safely reached by helicopter, and the closest hiking trail is the Three Sisters Trail on the far side of the Elk Canyon.

Expeditions to the cave usually take place in the autumn and winter months, when drier conditions reduce the amount of runoff into the cave and leave it much drier; however, the high humidity and frequency of water in the cave leaves cavers and their equipment perpetually damp. Cavers are also required to sleep in hammocks, as the cave floor is uneven and the possibility exists of rolling into deep chasms while sleeping in an untethered sleeping bag, particularly Camp II which is adjacent to the Vimy Ridge cliff.

Although none of the accidents have occurred in the cave required immediate attention, any incident would be handled by the Alberta/British Columbia Cave Rescue Service (ABCCRS) as the caves of British Columbia and adjacent Alberta are within their jurisdiction. In a comment to Global News, expedition member and ABCCRS provincial coordinator Christian Stenner warned:

"The consequences of an injury in this environment are tremendous, due to the hazardous conditions and exceptional remoteness."

Dangers faced by spelunkers in Bisaro Anima include falling rocks, deep canyons, narrow passages, steep drops, collapsing floors, and the potential for asphyxiation while diving.

== See also ==
- List of caves in Canada
