= Devil's Bath =

Cenote in British Columbia, Canada

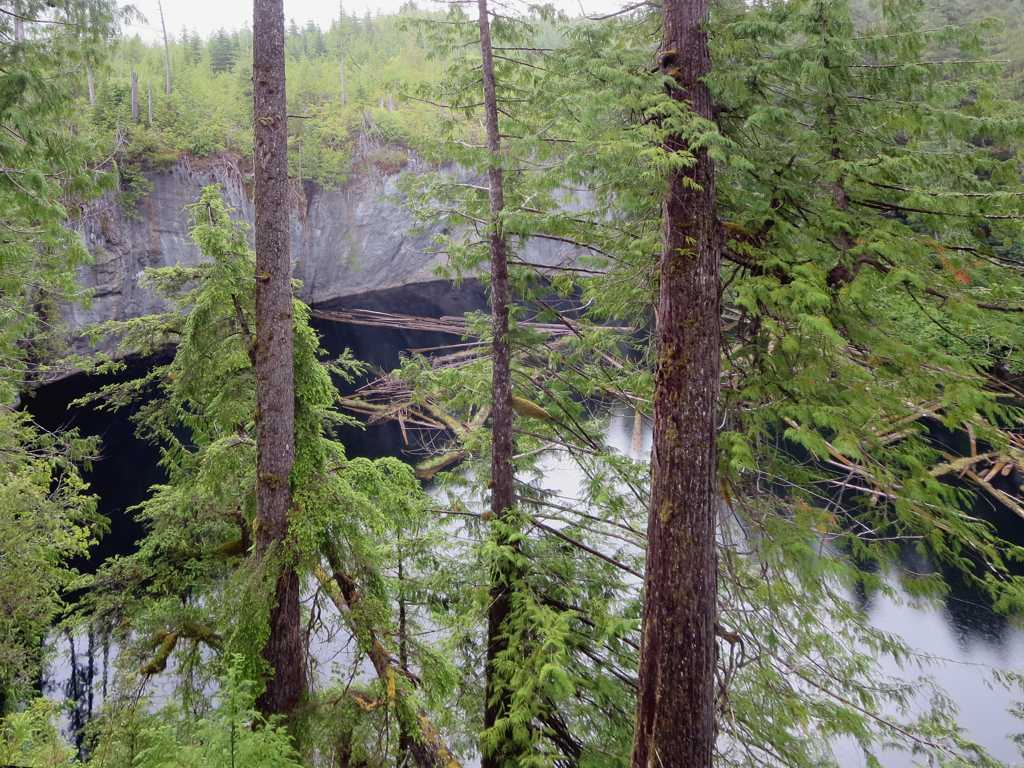

- Location within British Columbia
- Location: Vancouver Island, British Columbia, Canada
- Coordinates: 50°23′42″N 127°18′16″W
- Depth: 44 metres (144 ft)
- Elevation: 90 metres (300 ft)
- Geology: Karst
- Hazards: Floating debris
- Access: None

Devil's Bath is a large cenote located on Vancouver Island in British Columbia, Canada. With a depth of 44 metres (144 ft) and a circumference of 359 metres (1,178 ft), it is one of the largest cenotes in Canada.

== Geology ==
Devil's Bath is hydrologically connected to the Benson River through a series of underground passages 80 metres (260 ft) below the water table. This connection maintains the presence of water within the sinkhole.

== Access ==
Devil's Bath is located about 6 kilometres (3.7 mi) southeast of Port Alice along Alice Lake Road in a forested area owned by Western Forest Products Inc. Access to the cenote itself is restricted by the forest growth and the steep terrain leading to the edge of the cenote.

== See also ==
- Marble River Provincial Park
- List of caves in Canada
