= Catherine Hickson =

Canadian volcanologist

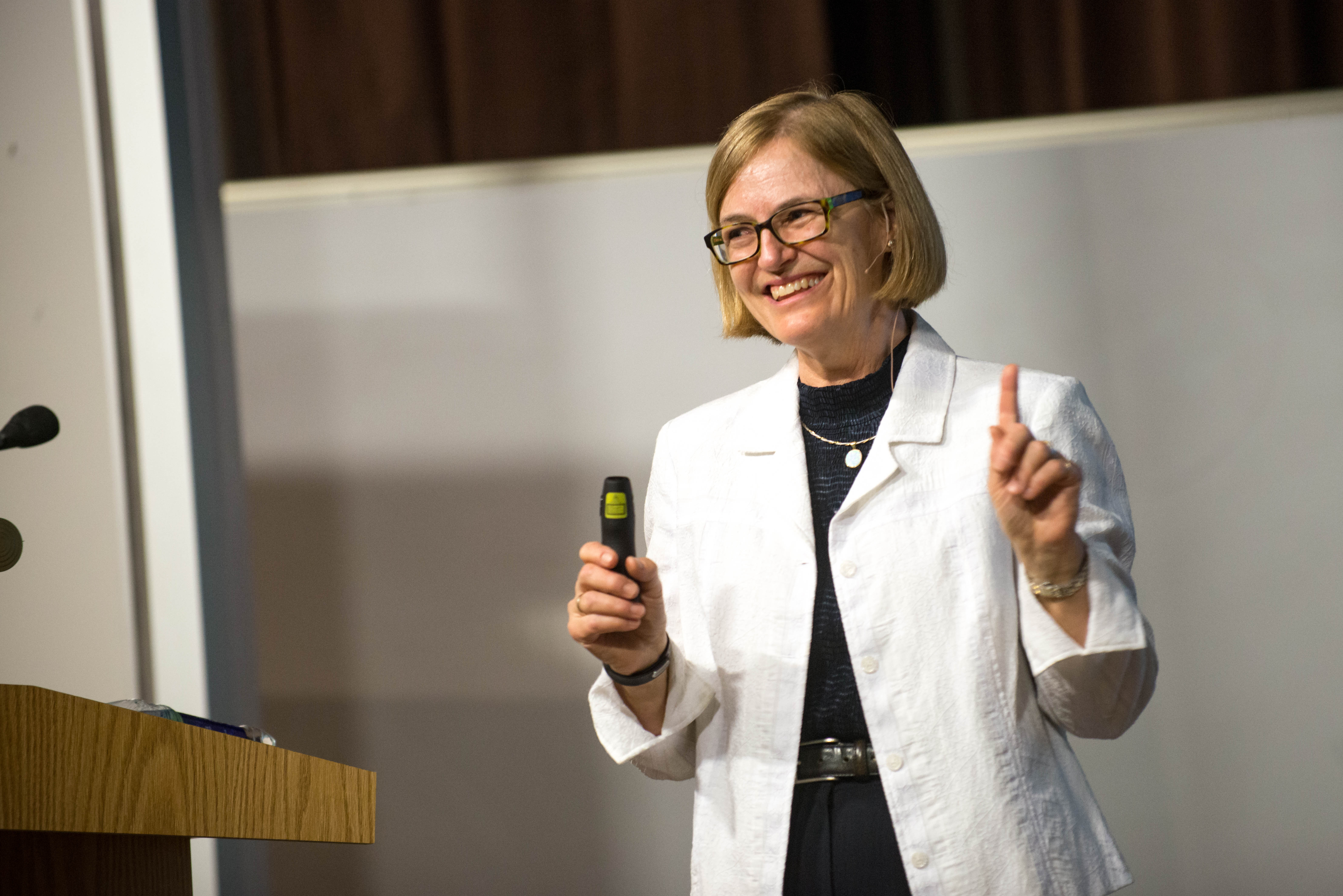
- Born: 1955 (age 70–71)
- Other name: Cathie Hickson
- Education: University of British Columbia
- Awards: Honorary Doctor of Technology - University of the Fraser Valley C.J. Westerman Memorial Award 2023 Geoscientists Canada’s Canadian Professional Geoscientist Award
- Scientific career
- Fields: Volcanology, geology, lithium exploration, geothermal energy
- Workplaces: TTGeo, Alberta No.1
- Thesis: Quaternary volcanism in the Wells Gray-Clearwater area, east central British Columbia (1987)

Catherine Hickson (born 1955) is a Canadian volcanologist, formerly with the Geological Survey of Canada, part of Natural Resources Canada. Since 2014, she has been the chief operating officer for Dajin Resources Corp. and president, Tuya Terra Geo Corp. Hickson studied at the University of British Columbia and received her PhD in geology and volcanology in 1987.

== Career and research ==
=== Education and early career ===
Hickson grew up in Edmonton, Alberta. During her childhood, family trips to Banff National Park, the Grand Canyon, and Yellowstone National Park exposed her to the natural world, including to geysers and volcanoes. As a student in 1980, Hickson was camping 14 km east of Mount St. Helens when the volcano erupted; she credited this event with changing the course of her career. She completed her undergraduate degree in 1982 and her PhD in 1987, both at the University of British Columbia. She undertook PhD-related field work in Wells Gray Park, British Columbia.

Hickson's early career focused on assessing past and future eruptions and hazard impacts of young volcanoes in Canada and globally.

Hickson spent 25 years with Canadian federal government at the Geological Survey of Canada, part of the Earth Sciences Sector of Natural Resources Canada. In 1998, she worked with the Province of British Columbia on Thunderbird III, a civil protection exercise focused on a hypothetical eruption of Mount Baker, Washington state, USA.

In 2003, Hickson was one of three scientists to report on a hypothetical eruption at the Canadian volcano, Mount Cayley. She also worked closely with the International Civil Aviation Organization creating pilot and airspace regulations for flight in regions impacted by volcanic ash. Furthermore, she formulated and implemented Canada's volcanic eruption response plan (Canada's Interagency Volcanic Event Notification Plan, IVENP) in the event of a volcanic event within Canada or in a neighboring jurisdiction.

=== Industry ===
Catherine moved to the private sector and joined Magma Energy Corp., a global energy company in 2008. In 2010, she became the VP Exploration & Chief Geologist at Magma Energy Corp. Working at Magma, and subsequently Alterra, she expanded her geothermal expertise to Chile, Iceland, Italy, Peru and the USA. After leaving Alterra in 2008, her work continues to involve harnessing electricity and heat from the hot water and steam released by volcanic activity and earth's internal heat engine.

In 2014, Catherine founded her own company, Tuya Terra Geo Corp., a geological and management services company specializing in supporting geothermal development, lithium exploration and public engagement in the earth sciences.

Combining her management and volcanological expertise as well as her global experience, she became a Director and Chief Operating Officer of Dajin Resources Corp., an energy metals company surveys lithium brines. Lithium brines are found in geological environments that host frequent volcanic activity and geothermal systems.

In February 2018, she and several other researchers resurrected the Canadian Geothermal Association, as Geothermal Canada. The Association was founded in 1974 and had been inactive for several decades. With increasing interest in geothermal development in Canada, the group felt the time was ripe to reestablish the organization to assist Canadian researchers and developers pushing geothermal project to fruition. The organization is officially called the "Pan Canadian Society for Geothermal Research, Innovation & Collaboration" and is registered as a not-for-profit society under the Societies Act of British Columbia.

Presently, Catherine is CEO of the Alberta No.1 Geothermal Energy Project, located near Grande Prairie, Alberta. A project which will provide both electrical and thermal energy to a heavy industrial district.

=== International work ===
Hickson's work has taken her to many parts of the world, including a significant amount of time in South America where some of the largest and highest volcanoes form the mountainous spine of South America. She was the creator and leader of the Multinational Andean Project (MAP), Projecto Multinacional Andeno (PMA), and Geoscience for Sustainability. This Project ran from 1996 to 2002, in partnership with Argentina, Bolivia, Chile, and Peru and was co-funded by the Canadian International Development Agency and the participating countries. The project focus was creating high quality geoscience data for resource development. A second project, Geoscience for Andean Communities (MAP: GAC), ran from 2002 to 2006, and focused on natural hazard mitigation (volcanoes, earthquakes and landslides) to create safer communities. It was expanded from the initial project to include 3 more participating countries: Ecuador, Colombia, and Venezuela. This work garnered Hickson the prestigious C.J. Westerman Memorial Award (2010) presented by the Association of Professional Engineers and Geoscientists of BC. Other awards include the Head of the Public Service Award (1999), given by the Clerk of the Privy Council, and an Honorary Doctorate of Technology from the University of the Fraser Valley in June 2015.

=== Other contributions ===
In addition to her scientific contributions, she has made contributions to many publications for young people and the public, as well as being a sought-after lecturer, field trip leader and supporter of science for the public. She was an eyewitness to the 1980 eruption of Mount St. Helens and wrote a book in 2005 describing her experience and explaining the mechanism of the eruption for the public. Hickson is one of a few female leaders in earth science and is an adjunct professor at The University of British Columbia where she mentors women and young managers and sits on thesis committees.

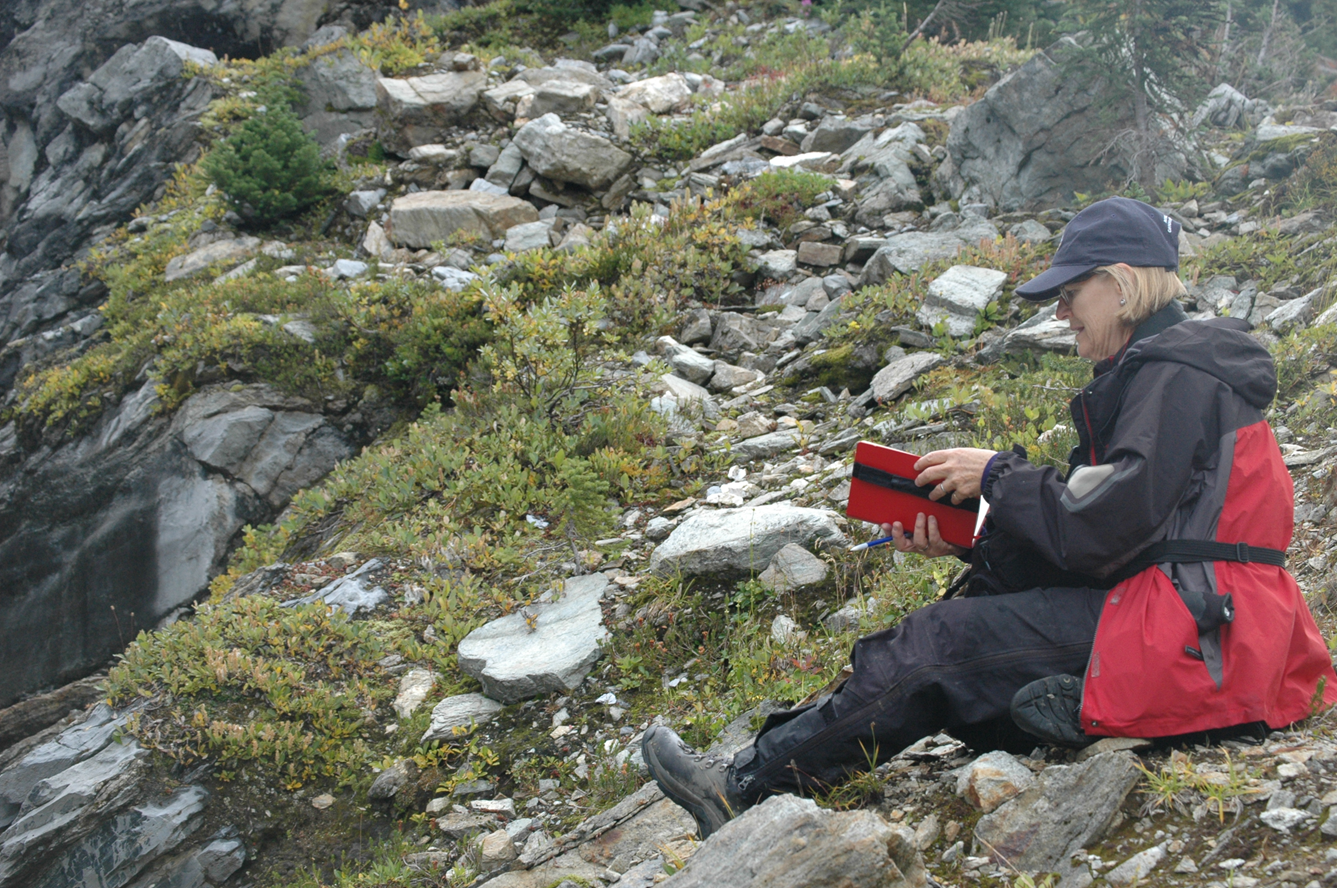
Catherine Hickson at the Wells Gray Park Cave discovery, 2018

As noted above, Hickson has been very involved in increasing the understanding of the public in the natural world. One of her key focuses has been Wells Gray Provincial Park. The park formed part of her PhD field work area in the early 1980s and she has been associated with it ever since. Leading field trips and lecturing about the geological heritage of the park, she brought the park to national and international attention through a bid to have it recognized as a UNESCO World Heritage Site. With colleague and lichen specialist, Trevor Goward, they presented a comprehensive application for its addition to Canada's tentative list of World Heritage sites. Although unsuccessful, they will continue to support the park with its rich geology and abundance of flora and fauna as well as critical habitat for the endangered Mountain Caribou. She is president of the Wells Gray Wilderness Society. This Society was established to increase understanding of the park through field studies, education seminars, public lectures and workshops. It is partnered with Thompson Rivers University who have a field camp in the park. She is also a board member of the "Wells Gray Gateway Protection Society". In 2018, Hickson led the first expedition to explore Sarlacc's Pit cave, a newly discovered karst cave in the Park which is the largest cave of its type. Catherine was contacted about the unusual feature due to her long-standing association with Wells Gray Park – first as a geology student who did her PhD on the geological young volcanoes found mostly in the southern part of the park, and later on as a scientist who continued to work in the park. She co-authored a book on Wells Gray Park – “Nature Wells Gray” with Trevor Goward. In addition, she wrote “Wells Gray Rocks” a companion book to Trevor's “Treasure Wells Gray” in celebration of the Parks’ 75th anniversary. These books for the public are in addition to technical field guides and scientific papers on the geology of the park. In 2017 Trevor and Catherine submitted an application for Wells Gray Park to be added to Canada's tentative list for UNESCO world heritage status. The application was part of a process to add sites to Canada's tentative list in celebration of Canada’ 150th birthday celebrations in 2017. Unfortunately Wells Gray was not among the eight sites named. Hopefully, this latest discovery will provide new impetus for Wells Gray Park to achieve UNESCO world heritage status in the future.

=== Wells Grey Cave discovery ===
Catherine was instrumental in recognizing the potential significance of a newly discovered cave in Wells Gray Park first reported to her in early May 2018. She realized that it was unlikely to be a volcanic feature (crater or lava tube), but most likely to be a karst feature, despite it not occurring in a thick limestone sequence. Catherine quickly reached out to John Pollack, an expert on caves, and an archaeological surveyor. Catherine and John Pollack are longtime associates through the Royal Canadian Geographical Society and the Explorers Club. She knew that John would either know himself what the feature was, or know whom to ask about the feature. Catherine also reached out to BC Parks and her local Clearwater contacts to organize the reconnaissance work. John and Catherine co-wrote the permit application (for exploration) and John sought additional support from the caving community – he brought in Lee Hollis and Chas Yonge. At the cave site exploration in September 2018, Catherine evaluated the geology and geomorphology of the site in an effort to understand more about the cave's formation and its age. She will continue to work alongside John and Lee to support the actual exploration of the cave in the near future.

== Notable publications ==
=== Books ===
- Mt. St. Helens: Surviving the Stone Wind (2005)
- Nature Wells Gray: A visitor's guide to the park (2004)
- Nature Wells Gray: The Clearwater Valley (1989)

=== Articles ===
- Hickson, Catherine J., T. C. Spurgeon, and R. I. Tilling. (2013). "Eruption Types (Volcanic Eruptions)." Encyclopedia of Natural Hazards. Springer Netherlands, 2013. 290–293.
- Hickson, Catherine J. (2013). "Base Surge." Encyclopedia of Natural Hazards. Springer Netherlands. 41–42.
- Hickson C., Spurgeon T., Tilling, R., and Adam P. (2013) Factors Influencing Volcanic Hazards and the Morphology of Volcanic Landforms. In: John F. Shroder (ed.) Treatise on Geomorphology, Volume 13, pp. 219–242. San Diego: Academic Press.
- Stix, John, Glyn Williams-Jones, and Catherine Hickson. (2008). "Applying the COSPEC at active volcanoes." The COSPEC Cookbook: Making SO2 Measurements at Active Volcanoes, edited by: Williams-Jones, G., Stix, J., Hickson, C., IAVCEI, Methods in Volcanology 1: 121–167.
- Stasiuk, Mark V., Catherine J. Hickson, and Taimi Mulder. (2003). "The vulnerability of Canada to volcanic hazards." Natural hazards 28.2: 563–589.
- Getsinger, Jennifer S., and Catherine J. Hickson. (2000). "Multinational Andean Project (MAP): Geological co-operation across borders." Geoscience Canada 27.3
- Hickson, Catherine J., et al. (1995). "Intraglacial volcanism in the Wells Gray–Clearwater volcanic field, east-central British Columbia, Canada." Canadian Journal of Earth Sciences 32.7: 838–851.
- Hickson, Catherine J. (1994). "Volcanism in the Canadian Cordillera: Canada's hazard response preparedness." Volcanic ash and aviation safety: Proceedings of the first international symposium on volcanic ash and aviation safety: US Geological Survey Bulletin. Vol. 2047.
