= Paul Chiasson =

Canadian author of pseudohistory

Paul Chiasson is a Canadian architect and author who has written pseudohistories about the settlement of North America.

In his first book, The Island of Seven Cities: Where the Chinese Settled When They Discovered America, Chiasson explains his belief that Chinese voyagers settled in the Cape Dauphin area of Nova Scotia almost a century before the voyages of Christopher Columbus. He suggests that the indigenous Mi'kmaq culture was influenced by these people in the form of possible archaeological remains, customs, costumes, art and even written language.

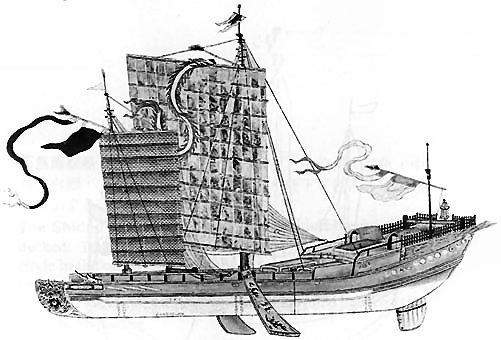
A large junk ship, 18th century. Chaisson argued that a vessel such as this may have arrived as part of the Ming treasure voyages.

His theory has been rejected by mainstream historians. Provincial archaeologists and a geologist have said that some of Chiasson's physical evidence of a Chinese settlement—a road up the side of Cape Dauphin and the stone remains of a wall surrounding the site —were actually built in 1952 by a volunteer fire company fighting a forest fire and again in the 1990s by a gravel company attempting to dig gravel on the cape. Chiasson challenges these statements in his second book, Written in the Ruins: Cape Breton Island's Second Pre-Columbian Chinese Settlement.

In December 2010, several years after the reports of the Nova Scotian archeologists, History Television aired a one-hour documentary entitled Mysterious Ruins: Cape Breton. The documentary explored Chiasson's theory and included interviews with an archeologist and a geologist from the area who viewed the site that Chiasson posits was the location of a pre-Columbian Chinese community. Geologist Sandra Barr of Acadia University and archaeologist Steve Davis of St. Mary's University stated that they found no evidence of any human settlement on the site. Acadia University reported that "their explanations are mostly ignored in the film." The documentary also included interviews with several Chinese architectural historians. Dr. Zhu Guangya, Professor of Architectural History at Southeast University, Nanjing stated (translation), "I believe the site is a ruin from a human settlement. Further study is required to confirm what kind of settlement it is." Professor Fang Yong said that "I feel that what he has found is not yet enough to prove that it is ruins of a Chinese settlement, but it is possible."

== See also ==
- Gavin Menzies
