= City of Ainsworth (paddle steamer) =

Canadian steamboat

Coordinates: 49.484°N 116.811°W

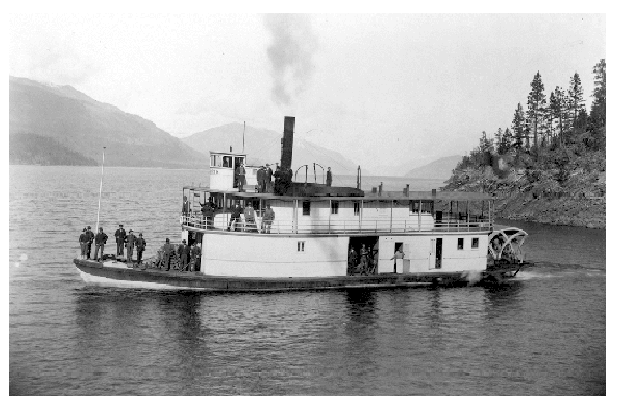
- City of Ainsworth on Kootenay Lake 1894

History

Canada
- Name: City of Ainsworth
- Launched: May 4, 1892
- In service: 1892–1898
- Fate: Sank on Kootenay Lake November 29, 1898
- Notes: Captain Lean

General characteristics
- Length: 84 ft (25.6 m)

City of Ainsworth was a paddle steamer sternwheeler that worked on Kootenay Lake in British Columbia, Canada, from 1892 to 1898.

In November 1898, she sank during a storm in the worst sternwheeler disaster in Kootenay Lake history. She sank to such a great depth that her wreck would go undiscovered for nearly a century.

== Career ==
City of Ainsworth was launched on May 4, 1892, the third sternwheeler built for service on Kootenay Lake, the first two being Nelson, launched in June 1891, followed by Spokane which worked for the Great Northern Railway. Ainsworth's route was from Kaslo to Nelson, stopping along the way at Ainsworth, Pilot Bay and Balfour. In the years following her launch several more sternwheelers were built for Kootenay Lake, among them, Kokanee, Kuskanook and the famous Moyie, which would serve the area for 59 years and be the last commercial sternwheeler to operate in the province as well as one of the very few that were preserved and can still be viewed today. City of Ainsworth, however, faced a far grimmer future.

On November 29, 1898, City of Ainsworth left Nelson for Bonner's Ferry and was caught in a gale-force storm. Loaded down with eight cords of wood on her bow, she began to founder. Passengers and crew were quick to throw the firewood overboard, but then the water rushed down onto her stern and she turned broadside and began to roll in the waves. At one point she rolled over so far that water rushed into her smokestack. The first officer put down one of the two lifeboats, but as soon as five people got in it, it was swamped and four of them were lost in the waves. The second lifeboat was launched with worse results, and another five people were lost. One of the lifeboats was regained and Captain Lean, joined by Seaman Donnelly and Engineer Kale rowed four passengers 3.2 km (two miles) through the storm-tossed water and deposited them safely at the shore. The three men made this trip twice more, rescuing all of the remaining passengers, but the final death toll, seven crew members and two passengers, made it the worst sternwheeler disaster on Kootenay Lake. City of Ainsworth sank in 110 m (360 feet) of water and its wreckage would not be discovered until 1990, nearly a century later. Once discovered the wreck was designated an underwater heritage site.

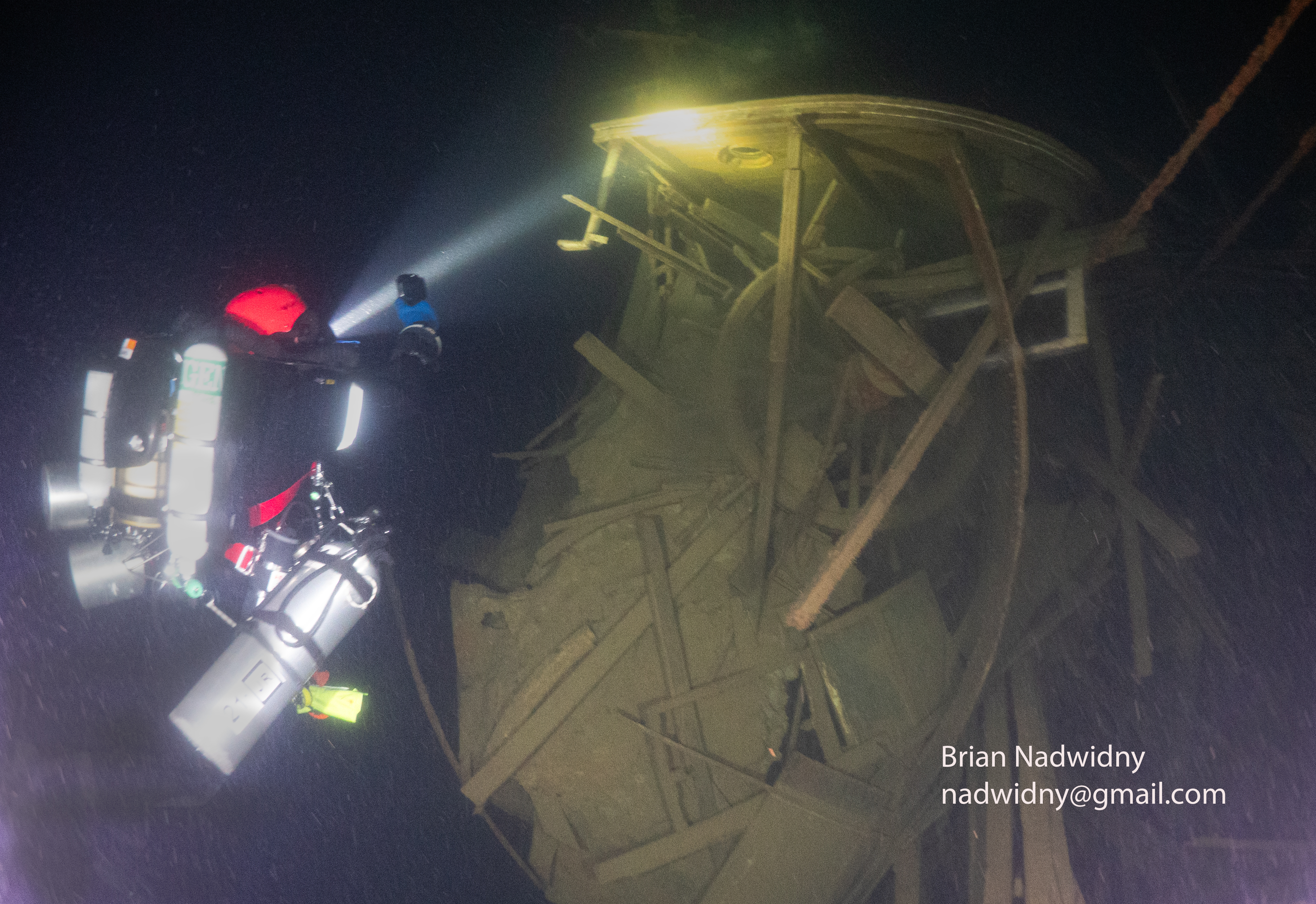
August 2023-Diver Johnny Ryan on the wheel of the City of Ainsworth. 110m depth (360ft)

== Diving the wreck ==
In September 1997, several members of the Cambrian Foundation successfully conducted two dives to City of Ainsworth. No previous attempts to dive down to the wreck had been conducted due to its extreme depth, the low visibility in the water and the dangerous surface conditions on Kootenay Lake. The dive team had to decompress for 75 minutes after spending only 10 minutes at the bottom, but they managed to film City of Ainsworth and reported that she was mostly intact and sitting upright.

During the week of August 28 to September 1, 2023, highly experienced divers from Alberta and British Columbia dove the shipwreck. The VexNow team (Divers: Brian Nadwidny, Johnny Ryan, Alan Drake and Glenn Farquhar. Supported by John McCuaig, Terina Hancock and Cathie McCuaig) visited the site 3 times and obtained video and photographic images that show the collapse over the years.

The same VexNow team went back in August of 2024 and did 4 dives and obtained more video footage and still photos.

== See also ==
- List of ships in British Columbia
- Moyie (sternwheeler)
