= Ainsworth Hot Springs =

Ainsworth Hot Springs Ainsworth (former)
- Unincorporated Community
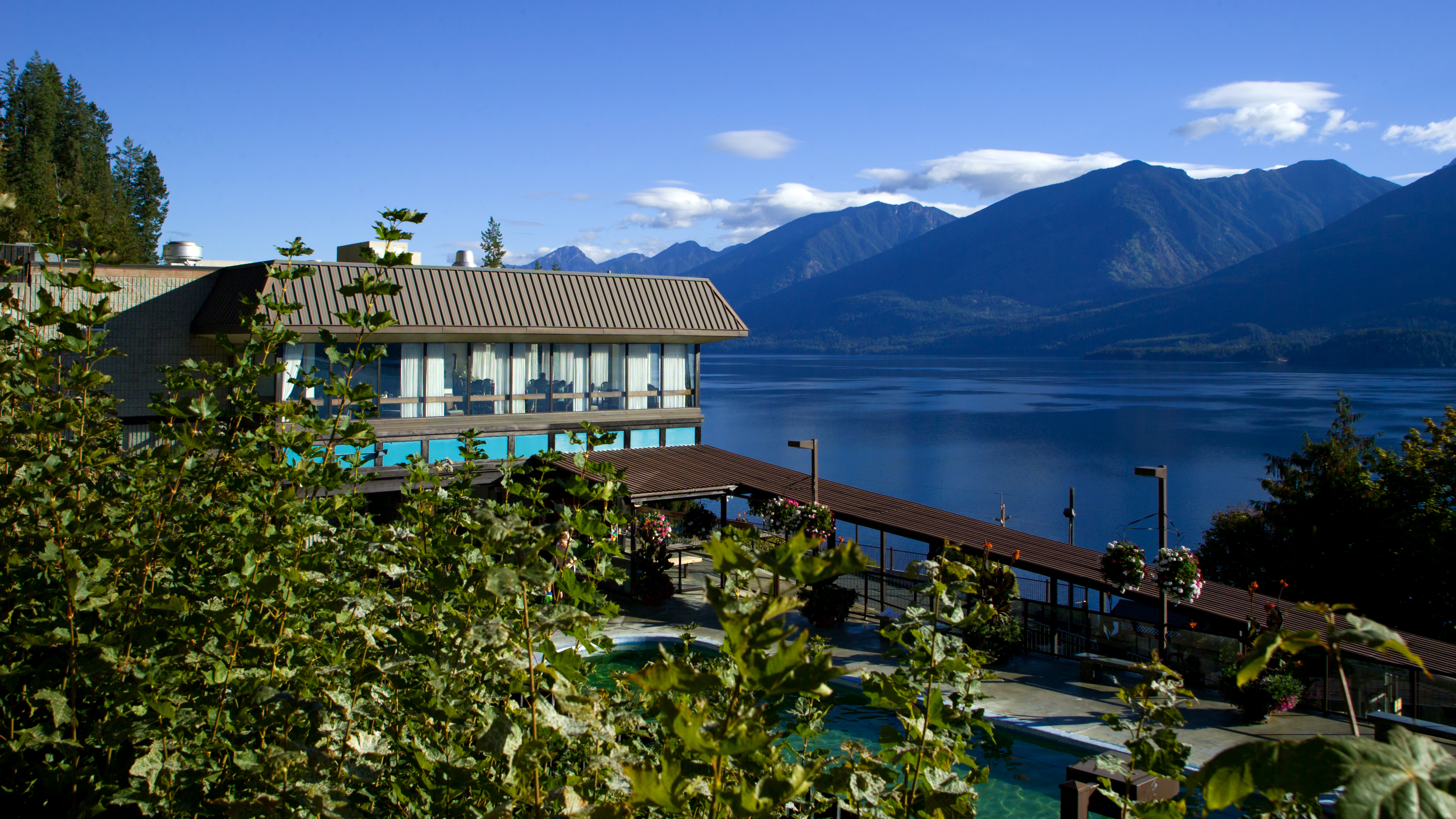

- Location within British Columbia
- Coordinates: 49°44′00″N 116°54′33.91″W
- Country: Canada
- Province: British Columbia
- Region: Kootenays
- Regional District: Central Kootenay
- Founded: May 31, 1883

Area
  - Land: 0.57 km^{2} (0.22 sq mi)

Population (2016)
  - Total: 20
  - Density: 35.7/km^{2} (92/sq mi)
- Time zone: UTC-8 (PST)
  - Summer (DST): UTC-7 (PDT)
- Postal code: V0G
- Area code: 250
- Highway: Highway 31
- Waterway: Kootenay Lake

Ainsworth Hot Springs, previously named Ainsworth, is a historic village and de facto ghost town on Kootenay Lake in British Columbia, Canada and has a population of 20. Founded on May 31, 1883, it is the oldest surviving community on Kootenay Lake. Ainsworth Hot Springs is located on Highway 31, 11 miles (18 km) north of Balfour and 12 miles (19 km) south of Kaslo, British Columbia. Today, Ainsworth Hot Springs and the Cody Caves are a popular destination for tourists and spelunkers.

== History ==
The founder of Ainsworth Hot Springs was George Ainsworth, a steamboat captain from Portland, Oregon, who, with his father John, had already made a fortune operating sternwheelers on the Columbia River. On May 31, 1883, George Ainsworth pre-empted 166 acres (67 ha) at what was originally Hot Springs Camp. He named the land Ainsworth in honour of his family. Upon hearing of the discoveries of silver-lead ore in the Kootenays, the brothers had travelled to British Columbia from Idaho via Bonners Ferry. Ainsworth grew into a town in 1884 when, "A.D. Wheeler landed there" with the first general store "started by G.B. Wright in the fall of 1888." Although Ainsworth was the town name, and Hot Springs (or Warm Springs) the mine camp, the names were used interchangeably.

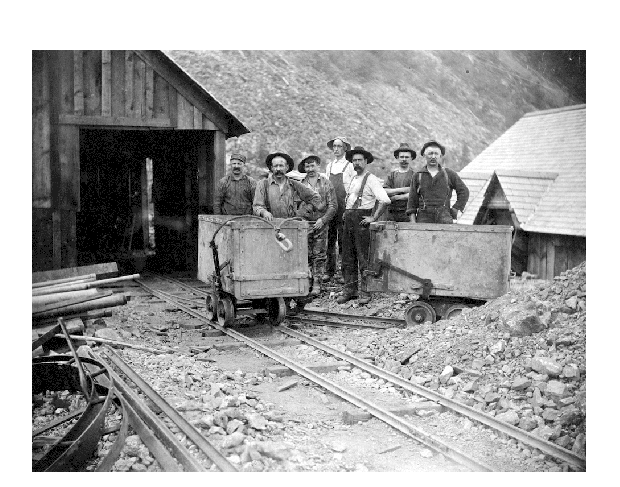
Miners at Tariff Mine near Ainsworth, 1897

From 1884, the mountains above Ainsworth were alive with mining activity and prospectors had staked nearly every inch of ground from the townsite to the glacial summits. By 1889, several mines including Number One, Skyline, Little Donald and Krao were operating. Among the prospectors was roadbuilder Gustavus Blin Wright, who had built part of the Old Cariboo Road. However, like many others, Wright would have no luck. Then in 1891, Eli Carpenter and John Seaton left Ainsworth for their mining claims, but returned after several futile weeks of searching. They returned to town by a route that took them over Payne Mountain, where they discovered ore samples worth CN$170 to $240 a ton. Carpenter's and Seaton's discoveries would be the catalyst for the Slocan Silver Rush and the region would become known as the "Silvery Slocan".

The town of Ainsworth prospered during this period and Gold Commissioner, Henry Anderson petitioned the government for a wagon road from the town to the mines and for a wharf. Both were built in 1889 and in 1891, the town was visited by the new sternwheeler Nelson, the first sternwheeler built to provide service for the communities on Kootenay Lake.

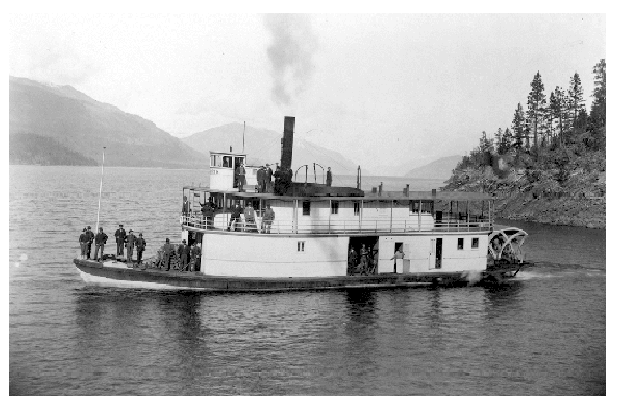
City of Ainsworth on Kootenay Lake in 1894

The Nelson didn't operate during the winter months and supplies had to be brought in by packhorse, driving up food prices and making such luxuries as liquor hard to come by. To solve the problems caused by this isolation, the community decided to build its own sternwheeler, one that could run all year round, connecting with Bonners Ferry. That sternwheeler was the City of Ainsworth, launched on May 4, 1892. The ill-fated boat had an unlucky launch, sliding down the ways stern first and flipping over onto her starboard side. She was soon righted by the steamer Galena and went on her maiden voyage without further incident.

Meanwhile, the town of Ainsworth continued to boom and the saloons and brothels prospered. One of the best known hotels in town was the Olson Hotel, built by Charles Olson, who had paddled up to the area on a raft in 1883. He built the hotel when he was 21 and kept it until his death in 1926. The Olson Hotel's most unusual feature was its two-story outhouse. The upper floor could be reached from the rooms in the second story of the hotel, while the ground floor was for patrons entering from the hotel's grounds. The toilets were bowls with lids on top, which the proprietor's wife kept from freezing in the winter by heating them with coal oil lamps.

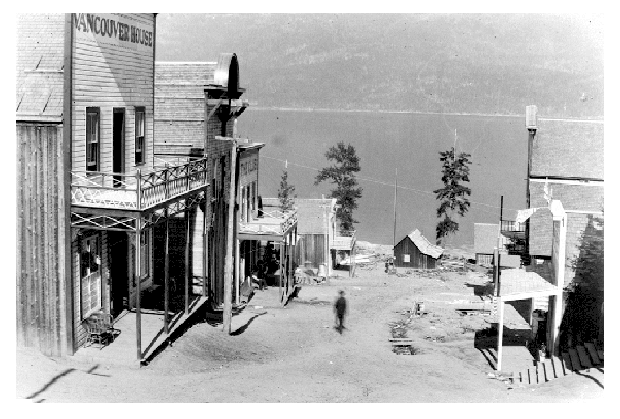
Main Street in Ainsworth, 1894

By 1893, Ainsworth began to fall into a decline, while Kaslo became the terminus for the Kaslo and Slocan Railway and thus was the supply center of Kootenay Lake.

Fire was a constant hazard in these pioneer communities and on April 26, 1896, much of Ainsworth was destroyed. The fire brigade saved the Green Brothers store and several houses, but the fire burned down thirteen hotels including Olson's. Rebuilding started immediately and most of the hotels were rebuilt. The Deering even boasted a swimming pool in its basement. Still, Ainsworth suffered in its isolation, having no roads until 1914 and not having electrical service until 1928. For many years, there was no hospital and the town's medical needs were provided by the local veterinarian, Dr. Henry.

The Olson Hotel was torn down in 1960, but the family name is honoured by Mount Olson in the Kokanee Glacier Provincial Park. Another pioneer hotel, the Vancouver House, became the Silver Ledge. Converted into a museum in the 1960s, it burned down in 2010.

In 1963, Ainsworth officially changed its name to Ainsworth Hot Springs.

== Modern day ==
Ainsworth Hot Springs is now a popular tourist destination and home to its namesake hot springs which originate in the Cody Caves area and are considered to be the best commercial hot springs in British Columbia. The temperatures vary from 40–42 °C (104–108 °F) in the cave to 35–38 °C (95–100 °F) in the pool.

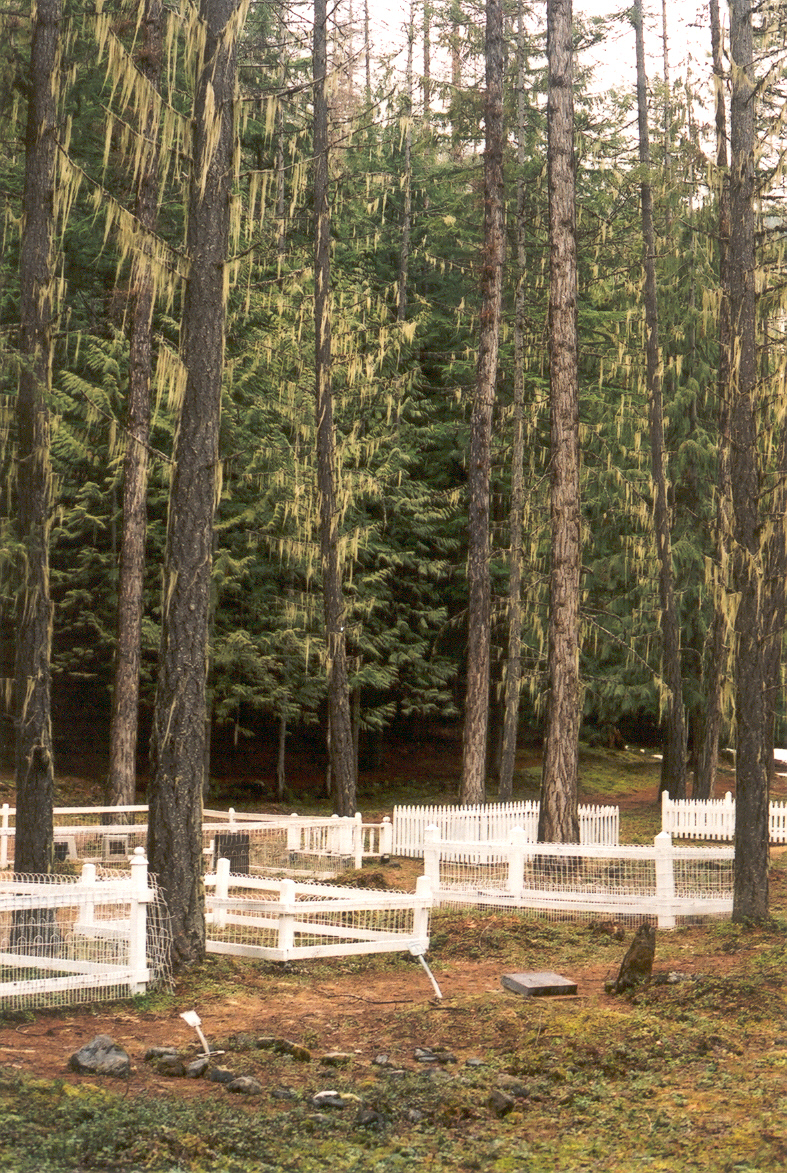
Tall Cedar trees with hanging 'Angel Hair' in the historic Ainsworth Cemetery.

== Attractions ==
- Cody Caves Provincial Park on the eastern slopes of the Selkirk Mountains are a system of ancient limestone caves with an underground stream.
- Kokanee Glacier Provincial Park offers fishing, canoeing and kayaking on more than 30 glacier lakes and 32,035 hectares (79,160 acres) of wilderness with hiking and ski trails.
- 12 miles to the north is the village of Kaslo, home to two National historic sites including the SS Moyie, the world's oldest intact sternwheeler.
- Northwest of Ainsworth is the historic ghost town of Sandon, the "Capital of the Silvery Slocan", once known as the "Monte Carlo of Canada".
- 11 miles south is Balfour, where visitors can enjoy the longest free ferry ride in the world, at the Kootenay Lake Ferry Crossing.

== Television ==
Ainsworth Hot Springs has been featured on the historical television series Gold Trails and Ghost Towns, Season 2, episode 10.
