= The Garg =

The Garg may refer to:

- The Gargoyle (newspaper), the student newspaper of University College, University of Toronto
- Gargoyle Humor Magazine, a student magazine at the University of Michigan

== See also ==
- Garg (disambiguation)
