= Saint-Leonard Cavern =

Cave in Montreal, Quebec, Canada

Coordinates: 45.5886°N 73.6077°W

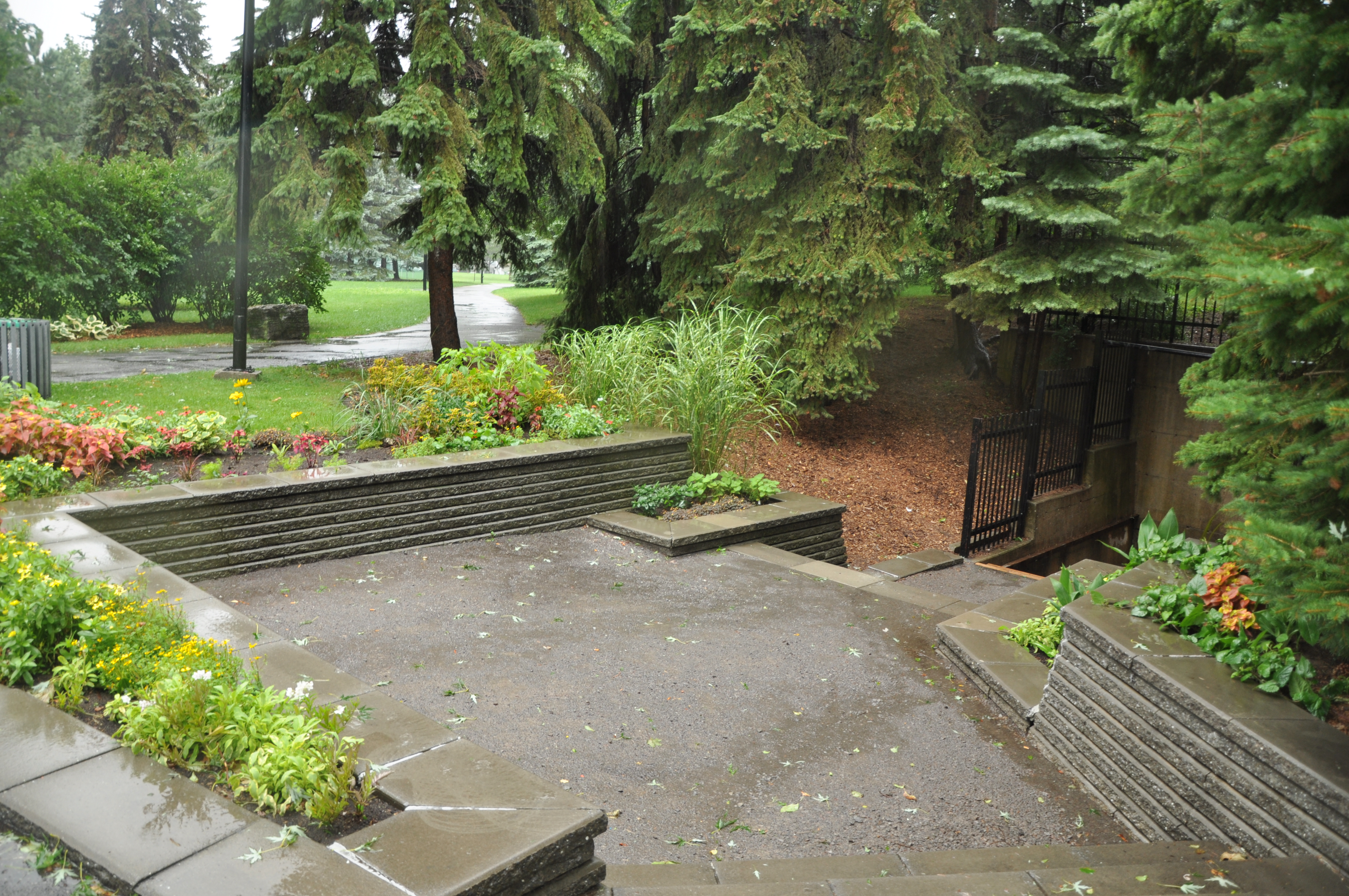
Entrance to Saint-Léonard Cave in Pie XII Park

The Saint-Léonard Cavern (French: Caverne de Saint-Léonard) is a cave on the island of Montreal, in Quebec, Canada. It is located underneath Pie-XII Park (Pius XII Park) in the borough of Saint-Léonard in Montreal. It is a registered historic site. The cavern has restricted access but guided tours are available.

== History ==
The cave was discovered in 1812. During the Patriote Rebellion of 1837, it served as an armoury, weapons cache, and hidey-hole for Les Patriotes. In 1968, the government deemed it a safety risk and closed off the cave. In 1978, the Quebec Speleological Society reopened the cave for study. It was subsequently declared a historic landmark, and tours were set up. Until 2017, the cave was thought to be comparatively small underground structure, at 35 metres long with a depth of 8 metres. However, a second cave was discovered in 2017 which measures 250 metres long. This dimension may be extended with further exploration.
