= Gargantua (card game) =

- A Patience game
- Family: Klondike-like
- Deck: Double 52-card

Gargantua is a patience or solitaire card game that is a version of Klondike using two decks. It is also known as Double Klondike (not to be confused with the two-player game known as Double Klondike or Double Solitaire).

== Rules ==
Instead of the seven depots forming the tableau as in Klondike, in Gargantua nine are formed. Forming these nine tableau piles of cards, i.e. dealing the cards, is like much like Klondike. One face-up card is placed on the first column, then eight cards are each placed face-down on the other eight depots. Over these eight face-down cards are one face-up card and seven face-down cards, and so on until all nine depots have a face-up card. The rest of the deck becomes the stock. The foundation/tableau should look like this:

      O   O   O   O   O   O   O   O
 
 
 ┌─┐ ┌─┐ ┌─┐ ┌─┐ ┌─┐ ┌─┐ ┌─┐ ┌─┐ ┌─┐
 │ │ ├─┤ ├─┤ ├─┤ ├─┤ ├─┤ ├─┤ ├─┤ ├─┤
 └─┘ │ │ ├─┤ ├─┤ ├─┤ ├─┤ ├─┤ ├─┤ ├─┤
     └─┘ │ │ ├─┤ ├─┤ ├─┤ ├─┤ ├─┤ ├─┤
         └─┘ │ │ ├─┤ ├─┤ ├─┤ ├─┤ ├─┤
             └─┘ │ │ ├─┤ ├─┤ ├─┤ ├─┤
                 └─┘ │ │ ├─┤ ├─┤ ├─┤
                     └─┘ │ │ ├─┤ ├─┤
                         └─┘ │ │ ├─┤ 
                             └─┘ │ │
                                 └─┘                          

As in Klondike, play consists of the following:

- The eight foundations, represented by the Os in the diagram, are built up in suits starting from the ace.
- Depots (piles in the tableau) and cards are built down by alternating colors in partial or complete piles.
- Face-down cards are immediately turned up when they become the top cards of their piles.
- Spaces can be filled only by Kings or piles with Kings as bottom cards.

For dealing the stock, cards from it are dealt to the waste pile one at a time and used if possible. The stock can only be dealt twice; afterwards the leftover cards are left at the waste pile. The game is won if all cards are transferred to the foundations.

== Variations ==
Harp is another two-deck version of Klondike like Gargantua, but the stock can only be dealt four times.

Ultra Klondike is a Klondike variant that uses multiple packs of cards. The most simple version involves two packs, with eight foundation stacks rather than four. Instead of the standard seven columns of cards used in normal Klondike, twelve columns are used for two packs, sixteen for three packs.

As the number of packs used rises, it becomes harder to complete the game, due to the increase in the proportion of suits to stacks (four to seven in single pack games, eight to twelve in two pack games, twelve to sixteen in three pack games). The standard numbers of foundation stacks and columns are shown in the table for different numbers of starting packs.

Packs	1	2	3	4	5	6	7	8	9	10	11	12	13	14	15	16	17	18	19	20	21	22	23	24	25
Foundation stacks	4	8	12	16	20	24	28	32	36	40	44	48	52	56	60	64	68	72	76	80	84	88	92	96	100
Columns	7	12	16	18	21	23	25	27	29	30	32	34	35	37	38	39	40	41	43	44	45	46	47	48	49

For 15 or more packs, an alternative starting layout is generally used with more columns, and fewer cards in the longest columns. Instead of the cards being laid out in a triangle, with one card face up in each row, two cards are turned up - one at each end of each row. A game with 20 packs would use 62 columns, with the two middle columns having just 31 cards.

== Bibliography ==
- Parlett, David (1979). The Penguin Book of Patience. London: Penguin. ISBN 0-7139-1193-X.

== See also ==
- Klondike
- List of patiences and solitaires
- Glossary of patience and solitaire terms
