= Bocock Peak Provincial Park =

Provincial park in British Columbia, Canada

- IUCN category II (national park)
- Location within British Columbia
- Interactive map of Bocock Peak Provincial Park
- Location: Peace River RD, British Columbia, Canada
- Coordinates: 55°51′34″N 122°55′09″W
- Area: 1,143 ha (4.41 sq mi)
- Established: June 29, 2000
- Governing body: BC Parks

Bocock Peak Provincial Park is a provincial park in British Columbia, Canada, located in the Hart Ranges of the Northern Rocky Mountains to the north of the summit of the Pine Pass on BC Highway 97. The park is particularly renowned for its unique limestone caves and rugged alpine terrain, offering seasoned hikers and cavers a primitive wilderness experience.
