= Ramesh Garg =

Ramesh Garg is currently a dean of student and alumni affairs in IIT Ropar. Previously he was a professor at the Indian Institute of Technology, Kharagpur (near Kolkata), India. Professor Garg is known for his work on microstrip antennas.

== Recent publications ==
- A Broadband Coupled-Strips Microstrip Antenna by R. Garg and V. S. Reddy, IEEE Trans. Antenna & Prop., 49 (2001) 1344-1345
- Microstrip Antenna Design Handbook by R. Garg, P, Bhartia, I. Bahl, and A. Ittipiboon. Norwood: Artech House. (2001)

== Awards ==
- Fellow, IEEE (2002)
- Fellow, IETE
- IETE Gowri Memorial Award for "Finite Difference Time 2000 Domain Analysis of Microwave Circuit (2002)

== Member of editorial board ==
- Member : International J. of RF and Microwave Computer-aided Engineering
