= Cody Caves Provincial Park =

Provincial park in British Columbia, Canada

- IUCN category III (natural monument or feature)
- Location within British Columbia
- Interactive map of Cody Caves Provincial Park
- Location: Central Kootenay, British Columbia, Canada
- Coordinates: 49°43′42″N 116°57′07″W
- Area: 63 ha (160 acres)
- Established: July 7, 1966
- Governing body: BC Parks

Cody Caves Provincial Park is a provincial park in British Columbia, Canada. It was formed in July 1966 to protect the Cody Caves and was the first subterranean park in British Columbia. The park is 13 km (8.1 mi) by road, northwest from the hot springs community of Ainsworth Hot Springs on Kootenay Lake.
