= Weymer Creek Provincial Park =

Canadian provincial park

- IUCN category III (natural monument or feature)
- Location within Vancouver Island Location within British Columbia
- Interactive map of Weymer Creek Provincial Park
- Location: Strathcona RD, British Columbia, Canada
- Coordinates: 49°54′00″N 126°37′00″W
- Area: 316 ha (780 acres)
- Established: April 30, 1996
- Governing body: BC Parks

Weymer Creek Provincial Park, formerly Weymer Creek Karst Provincial Park, is a provincial park located on the west coast of Vancouver Island in British Columbia, Canada, just southeast of the community of Tahsis in the region of Nootka Sound. Its most important feature is its karst topography and some of the deepest caves in Canada. Caving is currently not permitted in the park and visitors to the area are requested to practice "no trace" camping.
