= Cody Caves =

Network of caves in British Columbia, Canada

Coordinates: 49°43′35″N 116°57′10″W

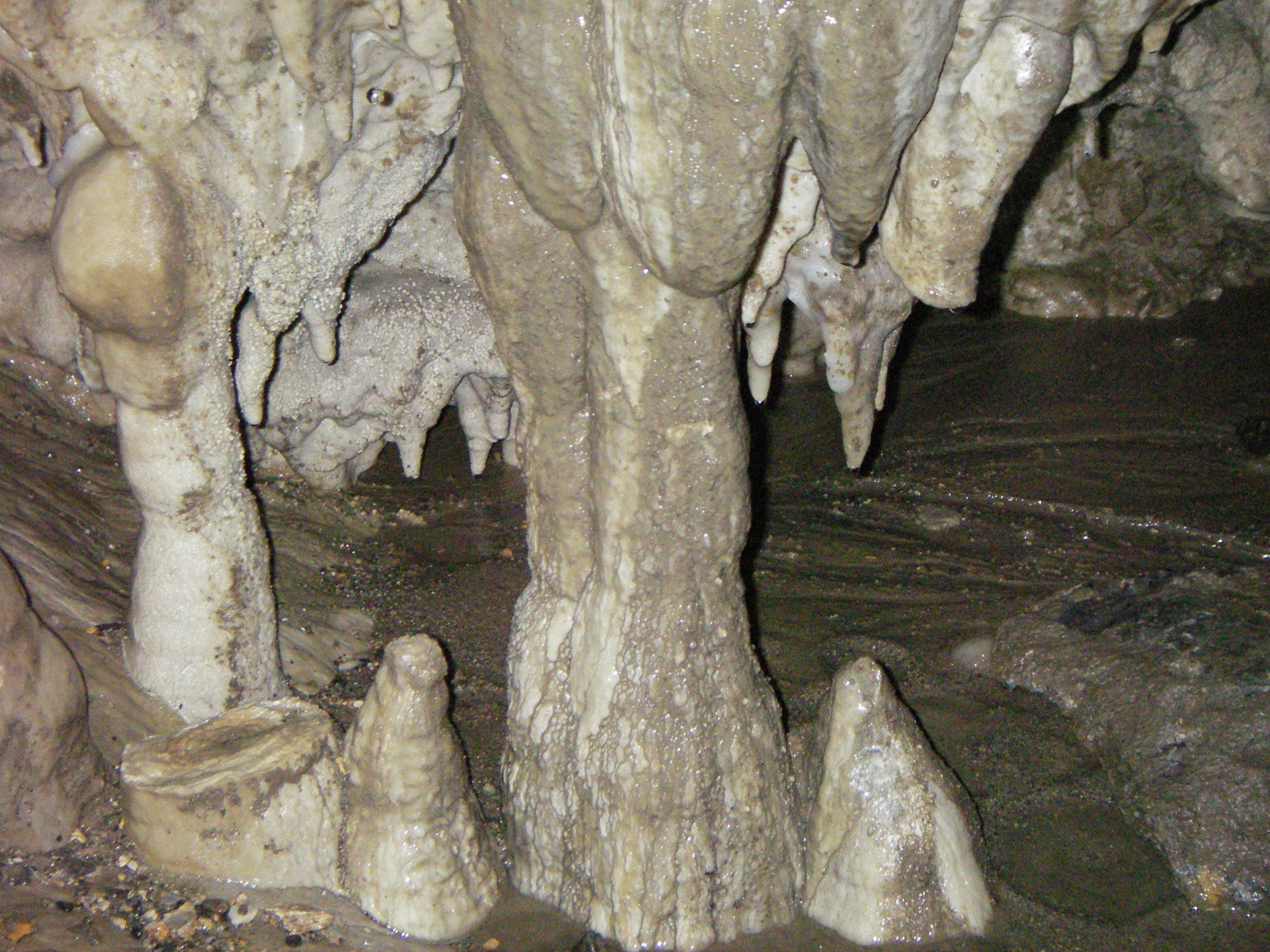

The Cody Caves are a network of limestone caves in the Selkirk Mountains in British Columbia, Canada. They are located 2 miles (3.2 km) north of Ainsworth Hot Springs on the west side of Kootenay Lake.

First documented in the early 1890s, the caves became protected in July 1966 with the formation of the Cody Caves Provincial Park.

Cody Caves is one of the best-known cave systems in British Columbia, and Cody Caves Provincial Park was the first subterranean park created in the province.

== Description ==
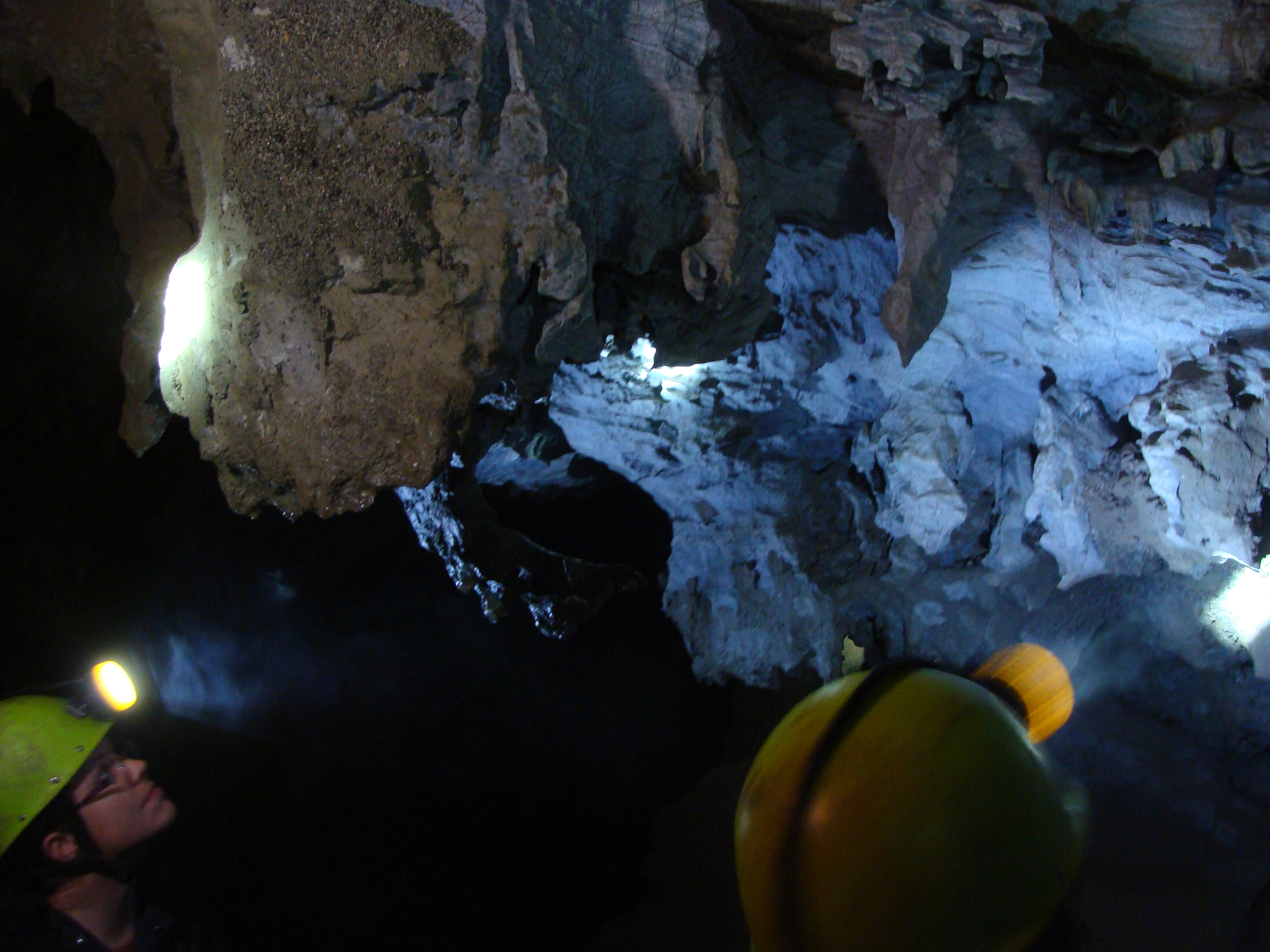
Stratification in Cody Cave

The story of Cody Caves began 600 million years ago when the limestone in which the caves later formed was laid down at the bottom of an ancient sea. Then, around 170 million years ago, the limestone beds were thrust upwards. This exposed the rock to the elements, water and carbonic acid, which eventually formed Cody Caves. Approximately 875 yards (800 m) of the Cody Caves passageways are explorable. The caves have several types of calcite formations, such as stalagmites, stalactites, soda straws and flowstone These ancient formations have been growing at an average rate of one cubic centimetre per hundred years. The boxwork is considered to be among the best in the world, protruding up to 20.3 cm, whereas 2.5 to 5 cm is average.

The Ainsworth Hot Springs originate in the Cody Caves area and are considered to be the best commercial hot springs in British Columbia. The temperatures vary from 40–42 °C (104–108 °F) in the cave to 35–38 °C (95–100 °F) in the pool.

== History ==
The caves were likely known to local First Nations people, but the first recorded visit was by prospector Henry Cody, who with hundreds of others had come to the Kootenays looking for silver. The caves gained popularity in 1899 when an article, The Noble Five, was published in Argosy Magazine describing the caves as being "lined with gold".

In 1908, the caves were visited by the Governor General of Canada, Earl Grey.

To protect this valuable resource, the Cody Caves Provincial Park was formed in July 1966. Due to the delicacy of cave formations, the caves can be explored by guided tour only.

Cody Caves is part of the setting for the children's novel, The Kootenay Kidnapper, by BC novelist, Eric Wilson.

== Modern day ==
Today, around 1000 visitors come to Cody Cave Provincial Park every summer. Visitors are guided through the cave on tours that vary in length with a professional guide. There are three tours available - Adventure, Explorer and Family.

The caves are accessible to everyone, from expert cavers to novices and families. Special school and group tours can also be arranged.

In June 2010, guided tours and cave access had been suspended. As of June 2013, access has been reinstated and guided tours begin once again. For preventative measures against the spread of white-nose syndrome in bats, cave visitors are advised not to carry caving gear from areas east of the Rockies into any BC caves and encouraged to download and read the website's supplied documentation on white-nose syndrome and procedures for decontamination.

== See also ==
- List of caves
- List of British Columbia Provincial Parks
- List of hot springs

== Notes ==
- "Cody Caves Provincial Park". BC Geographical Names. Government of British Columbia – B.C. Geographical Names Office (BCGNO).
- BCGNIS entry "Cody Caves"
