= V. K. Garg =

Indian environment scientist

Prof. V. K. Garg
- Other name: Vinod Kumar Garg
- Education: Ph.D.
- Scientific career
- Workplaces: Central University of Punjab, Bathinda

V. K. Garg is dean of the School of Environment And Earth Sciences, Central University Of Punjab, Bathinda. He is also dean of students welfare of CUPB. He visited EPFL, Lausanne, Switzerland, in 2015 as visiting scientist, Deakin University, Geelong, Australia, in January–February 2014 under TEQIP-II Programme.

== Education and career ==
He attended Kurukshetra University, Kurukshetra in 1985 and completed his B.Sc. in biology. In 1987 he did M.Sc. in chemistry from Chaudhary Charan Singh Haryana Agricultural University, Hisar. He remained there for Ph.D., which he completed in 1992. He started his career as assistant scientist (1992–1996) in the Department of Agronomy, CCS Haryana Agricultural University, Hisar. After working there he joined the Department of Environmental Science and Engineering, Guru Jambheshwar University of Science and Technology, Hisar as associate professor (1996–2004), professor (2004–2016). He moved in 2016 to the Central University of Punjab, where he is serving in various capacities.

== Works ==
He has guided 17 doctorate students and more than 150 research papers are to his credit.

- Sachdeva, Saloni; Garg, Vinod K.; Labhsetwar, Nitin K.; Singh, Anita; Yogalakshmi, K. N. (2022), Zero Waste Biorefinery: A Comprehensive Outlook, Energy, Environment, and Sustainability, Singapore: Springer Singapore, pp. 3–22, doi:10.1007/978-981-16-8682-5_1, ISBN 978-981-16-8681-8, S2CID 245924198
- Yadav, Anoop; Garg, V. K. (2015-11-09). "Influence of vermi-fortification on chickpea (Cicer arietinum L.) growth and photosynthetic pigments". International Journal of Recycling of Organic Waste in Agriculture. 4 (4): 299–305. doi:10.1007/s40093-015-0109-z. ISSN 2195-3228. S2CID 85848340.
- Mago, Monika; Gupta, Renuka; Yadav, Anoop; Kumar Garg, Vinod (November 2021). "Sustainable treatment and nutrient recovery from leafy waste through vermicomposting". Bioresource Technology. 347 126390. doi:10.1016/j.biortech.2021.126390. ISSN 0960-8524. PMID 34822988. S2CID 244501430.
- Singh, Manbir; Garg, V. K. (2022-01-07). "A comprehensive physico-chemical quality and heavy metal health risk assessment study for phreatic water sources in Narora Atomic Power Station region, Narora, India". Environmental Monitoring and Assessment. 194 (2): 69. doi:10.1007/s10661-021-09694-8. ISSN 0167-6369. PMID 34994867. S2CID 245774376.
- Dhanker, Rinku; Chaudhary, Suman; Goyal, Sneh; Garg, Vinod Kumar (August 2021). "Influence of urban sewage sludge amendment on agricultural soil parameters". Environmental Technology & Innovation. 23 101642. doi:10.1016/j.eti.2021.101642. ISSN 2352-1864. S2CID 236256640.

== Awards ==
- In 2007, received top Reviewer Award by Elsevier.
- In 2010, he received outstanding Reviewer Award from Elsevier.
- In 2011, received award for highest citations of Research work Fellow, Biotech Research Society of India.
- In 2012, Thomson Reuters India Citation Award.
- In 2013, received outstanding Reviewer Award from Elsevier.
