= Artlish Caves Provincial Park =

Provincial park in British Columbia, Canada

- IUCN category II (national park)
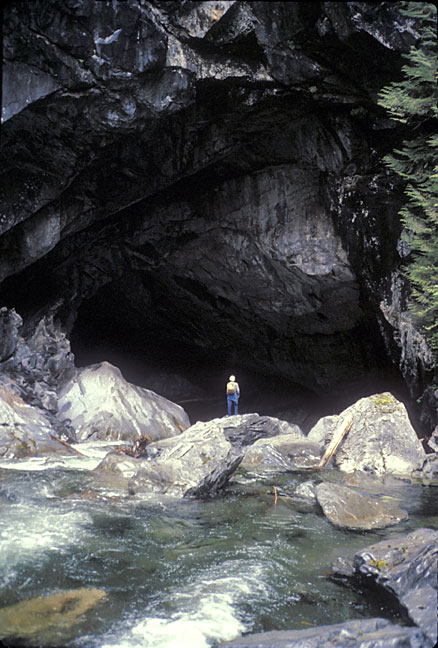
- Artlish River Cave

- Location within Vancouver Island Location within British Columbia
- Interactive map of Artlish Caves Provincial Park
- Location: Strathcona RD, British Columbia
- Nearest city: Woss
- Coordinates: 50°08′24″N 126°54′23″W
- Area: 285 ha (700 acres)
- Designation: Provincial Park
- Created: 30 April 1996
- Governing body: BC Parks

Artlish Caves Provincial Park is a provincial park on Vancouver Island in British Columbia, Canada.

== History and conservation ==
The name of the Artlish River is derived from the A'licath (Artlish) natives, part of the Kyuquot confederacy. The first recorded reference to the caves is in a 1932 report to the Canadian Geological Survey, although the caves were certainly known to local hunters, miners and timber cruisers prior to that. Formal exploration and documentation of the caves between 1974 and 1978 resulted in a cave survey of each under the names Artlish River Cave and The Black Hole, with 396 and 740 m (1,299 and 2,428 ft) of measured passage lengths respectively.

Increased publicity and concern over potential damage by timber harvesting led to a reserve around the two caves conferred by the BC Forest Service in 1977. This was elevated to provincial park status in 1996. The park protects Vancouver Island's last remaining undisturbed karst unit that includes a major river cave. The area provides winter habitat and a migration corridor for Roosevelt elk, as well as habitat for sockeye, Coho, Chinook, and pink salmon, steelhead and rainbow trout. The park also protects coastal western hemlock and western red cedar as well as some amabilis fir and Sitka spruce.

== Location ==
Artlish Caves Provincial Park is located approximately 80 kilometres (50 miles) south of Port McNeill, British Columbia and 78 km (48 mi) northwest of Woss, British Columbia, part way along the Zeballos road. A secondary logging road into the park was deactivated in 2009. A hike of approximately 4.5 km (2.8 mi) is required to reach the park boundary, and further hiking through old growth forest is required to reach the caves.
