= Small River Caves Provincial Park =

Provincial park in British Columbia, Canada

- IUCN category III (natural monument or feature)
- Location within British Columbia
- Interactive map of Small River Caves Provincial Park
- Location: Fraser-Fort George, British Columbia, Canada
- Coordinates: 53°11′13″N 119°30′21″W
- Area: 1,818 ha (7.02 sq mi)
- Established: June 29, 2000
- Governing body: BC Parks

Small River Caves Provincial Park is a provincial park in British Columbia, Canada.
