= Cape Dauphin =

Headland in Nova Scotia, Canada

Cape Dauphin Kukumijinawenaq
- Cape
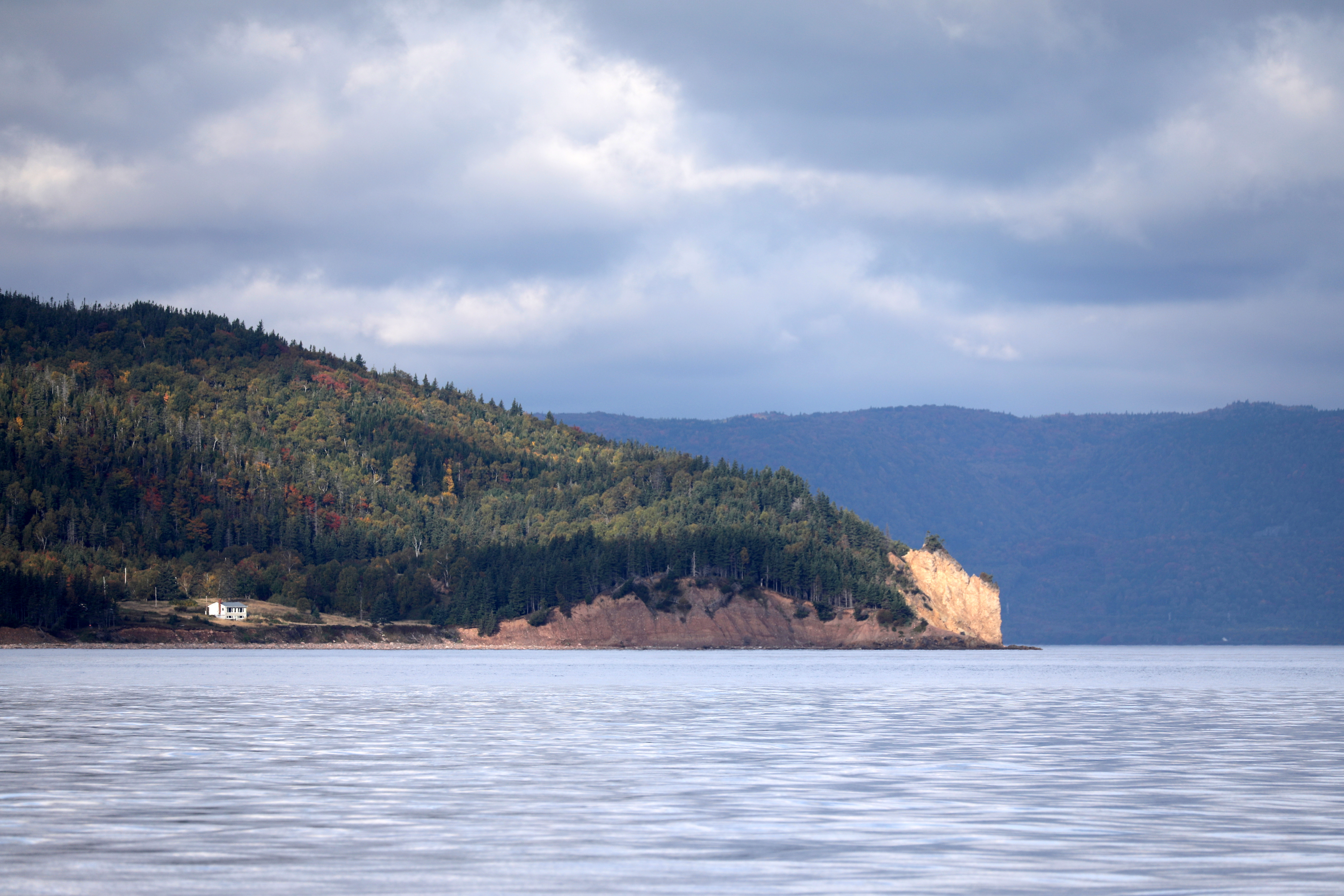
- Cape Dauphin from the mouth of the Great Bras d'Or

- Location in Nova Scotia Cape Dauphin (Canada)
- Coordinates: 46°20′31″N 60°24′57″W
- Location: Victoria County, Nova Scotia
- Offshore water bodies: Great Bras d'Or, St. Ann's Bay, Cabot Strait, Gulf of Saint Lawrence
- Elevation: 20 m (66 ft)
- Topo map: NTS 11K8 Bras d'Or

Cape Dauphin is a Canadian headland in Victoria County, Nova Scotia.

The cape is located on the east coast of Cape Breton Island and divides St. Ann's Bay to the north from the Great Bras d'Or channel to the south. Cape Dauphin lies at the foot of Cape Dauphin Mountain which rises to the southwest to a summit of 334.1 metres (1,096 ft) above the shores of the cape. The easternmost tip of Cape Dauphin is composed of karst topography and has several solution caves in the area, one of which, "Fairy Hole" is a sea cave reputedly linked to various legends of the Mi'kmaq Nation.

The Fairy Hole Trail (named for Glooscap's Cave, which is in the area) runs along Cape Dauphin. Visitors to this area should also beware of coyotes and take appropriate security precautions.

== Mythology ==
In 2006, Paul Chiasson published the book The Island of Seven Cities: Where the Chinese Settled When They Discovered America, proposing that Chinese explorers set foot and left some ruins on Cape Dauphin during the 15th century, long before the English or the French. Provincial archeologists have refuted this claim, according to an article published by CBC News (Nova Scotia):

"The claim was so provocative (that) David Christianson, curator of archeology with the Nova Scotia Museum, and four other archeologists headed out to the site to investigate for themselves... In the end, the five archeologists all agreed there was no human settlement in the area, Chinese or otherwise."

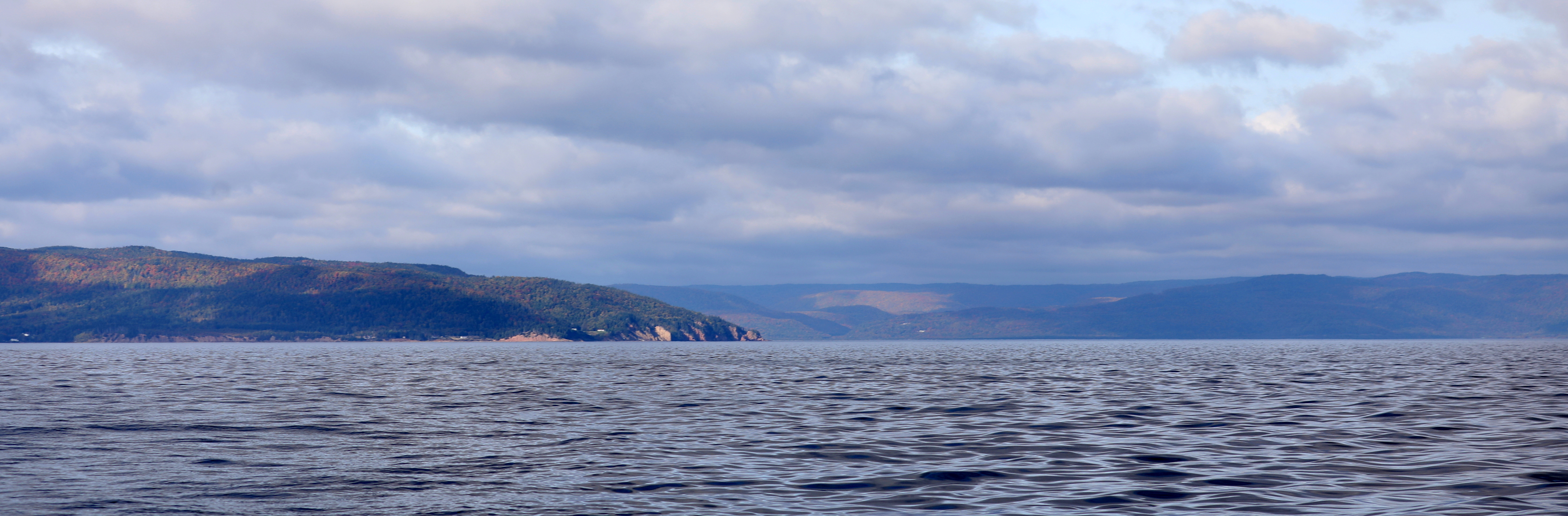
Cape Dauphin from the mouth of the Great Bras d'Or, Cape Dauphin Mountain rising to the left, the Cape Breton Highlands in the distance.
