= Gargantua (cave) =

Cave in British Columbia, Canada

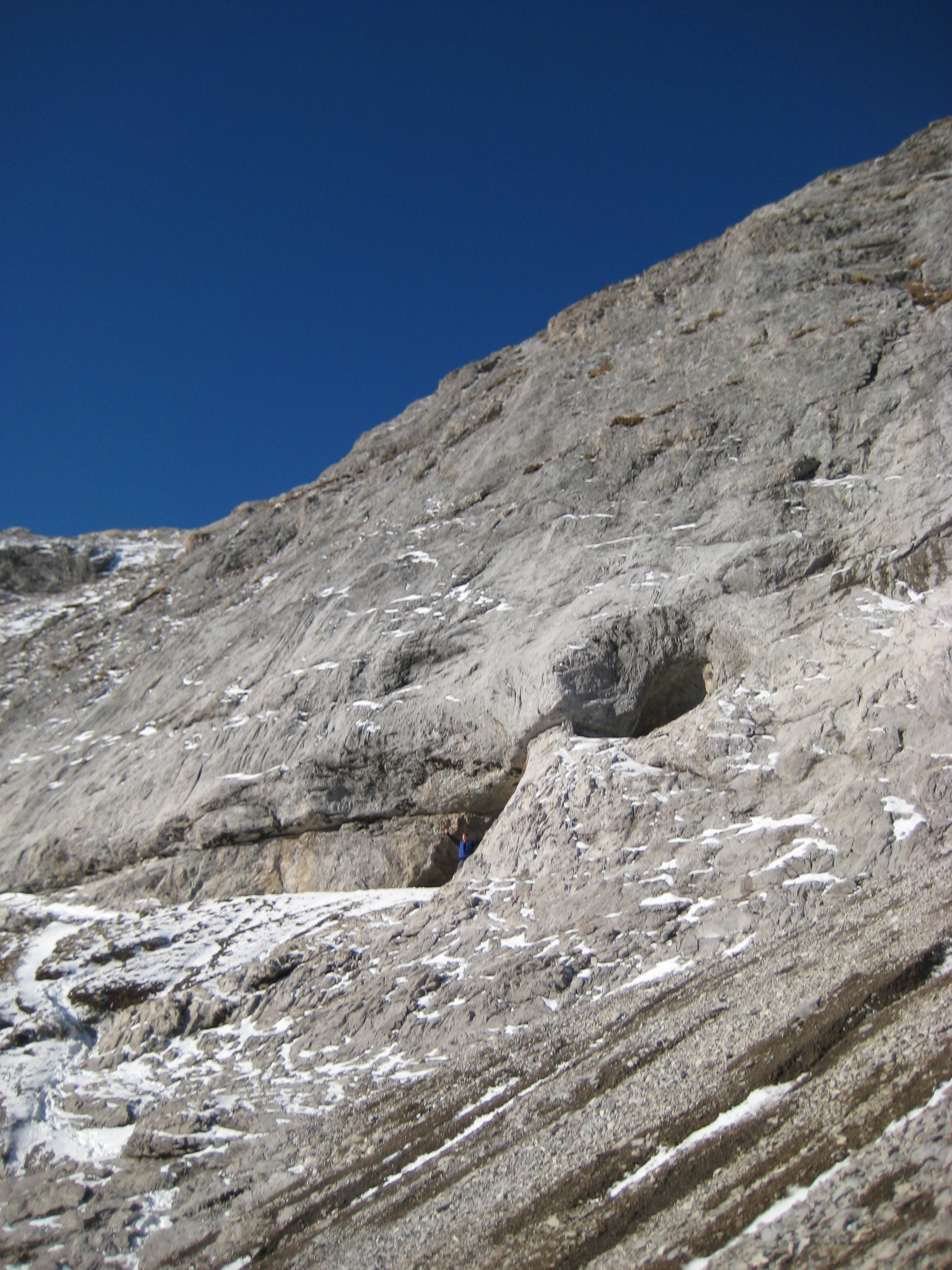
- Upper (teapot) entrance
- Location: Andy Good Plateau, Canada
- Depth: 286 metres (938 ft)
- Length: 6,001 metres (19,688 ft)
- Geology: Limestone
- Entrances: 5
- Hazards: Ice, squeezes

Gargantua is a limestone cave located on the Andy Good Plateau in Alberta and British Columbia, Canada. As of 2002 it has 6,001 metres (19,688 ft) of known passages with a depth of 286 metres (938 ft). It contains the largest natural cavern in Canada at 290 metres (950 ft) long, 30 metres (98 ft) wide and 25 metres (82 ft) high.

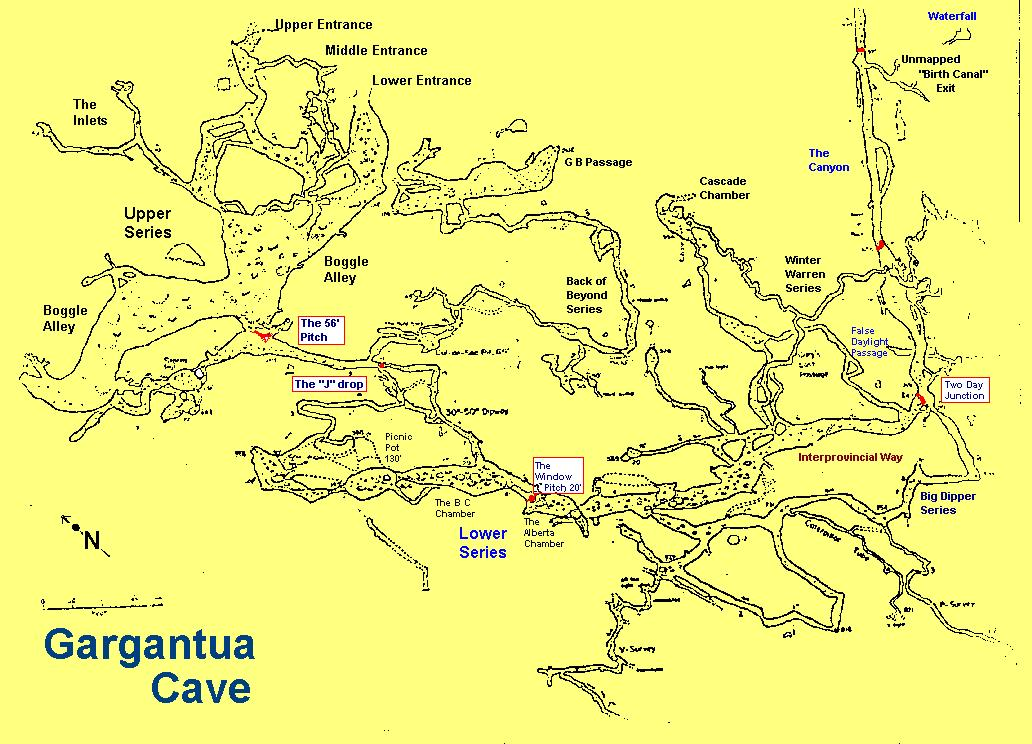
The only known map of gargantua cave

In October 2002, a group of caving club students from W. R. Myers High School were trapped in the cave overnight, after failing to break through the ice covering the waterfall exit.

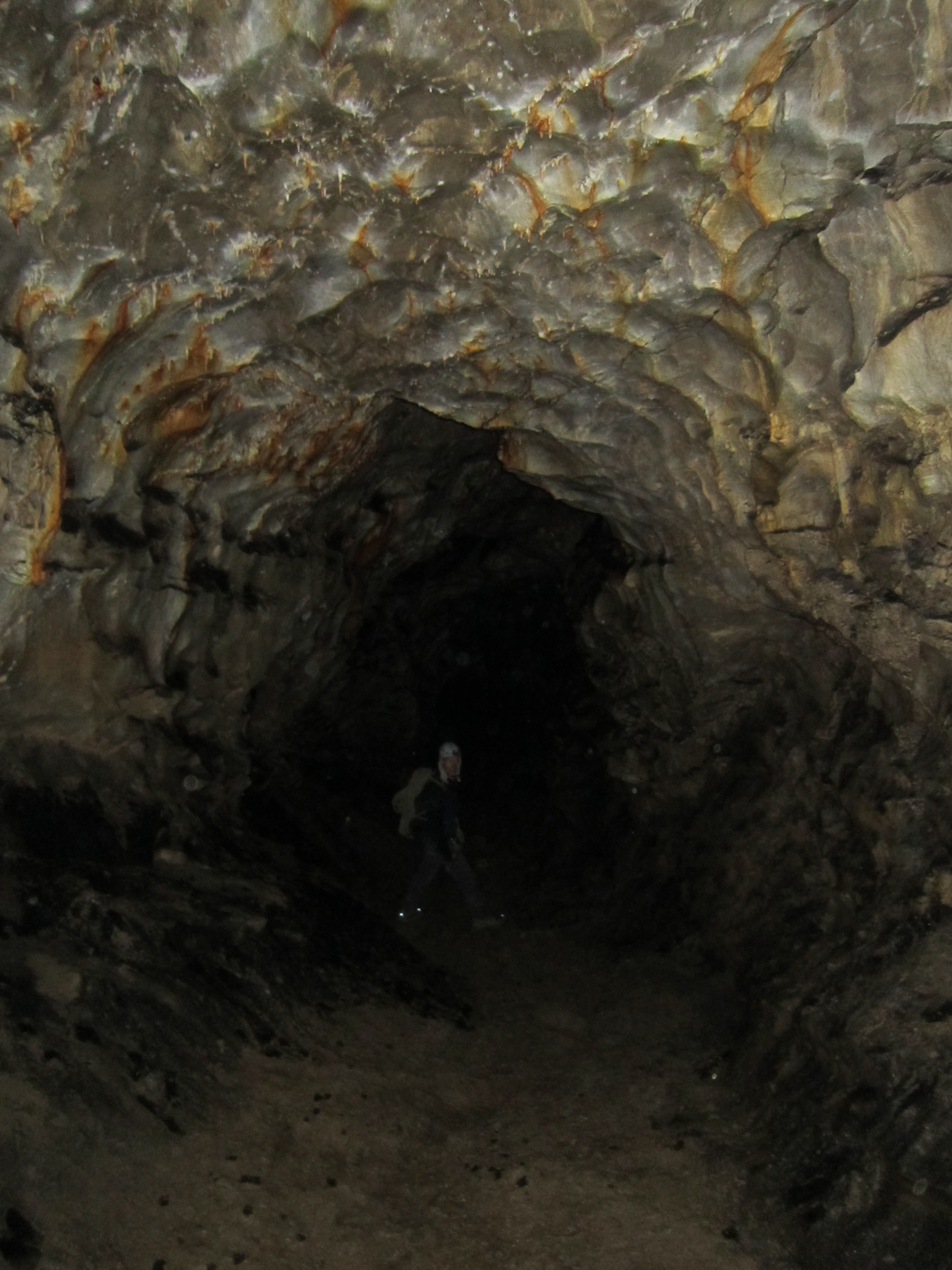
The Big Dipper

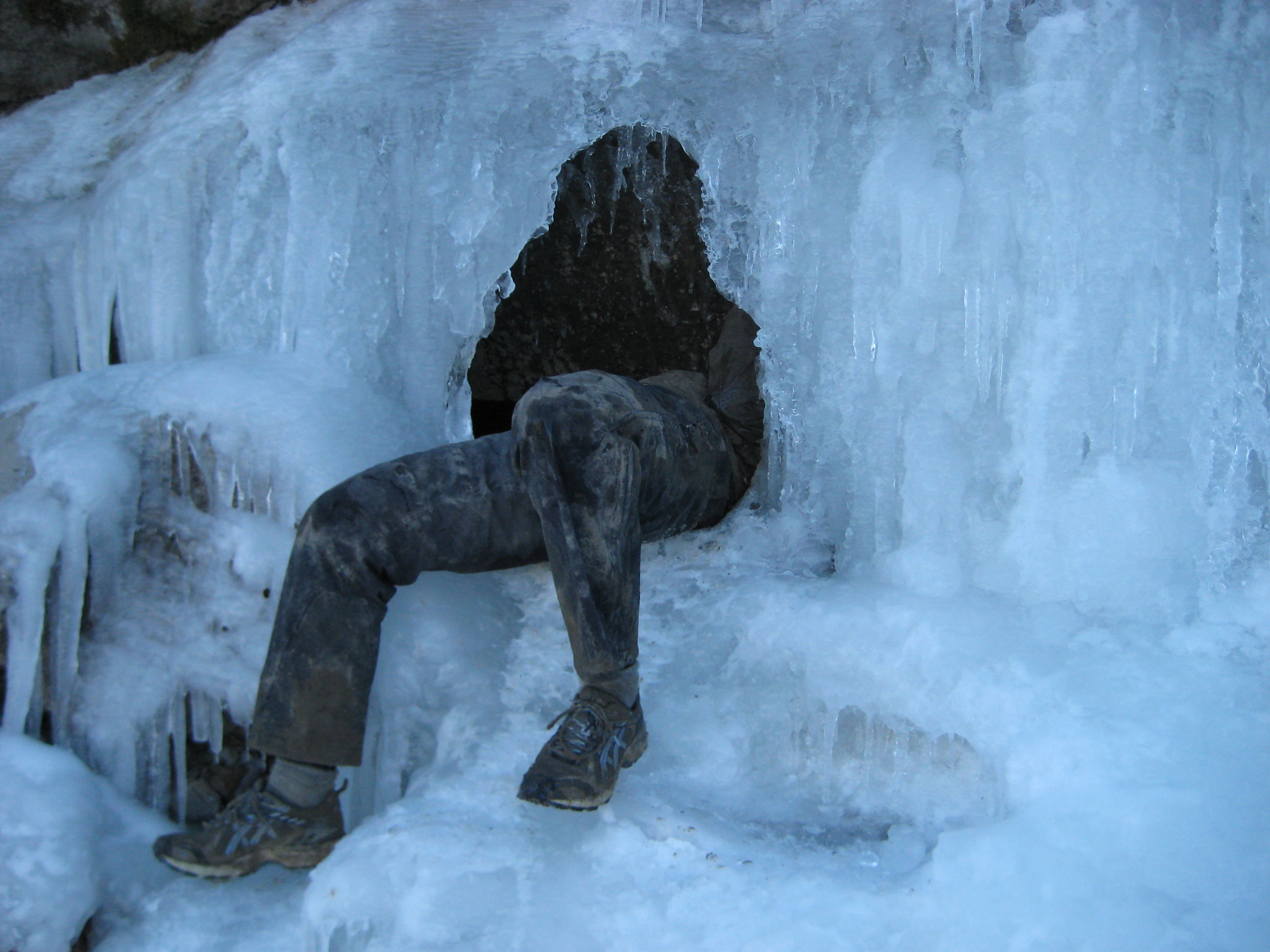
The waterfall exit after breaking through the ice to exit in the fall

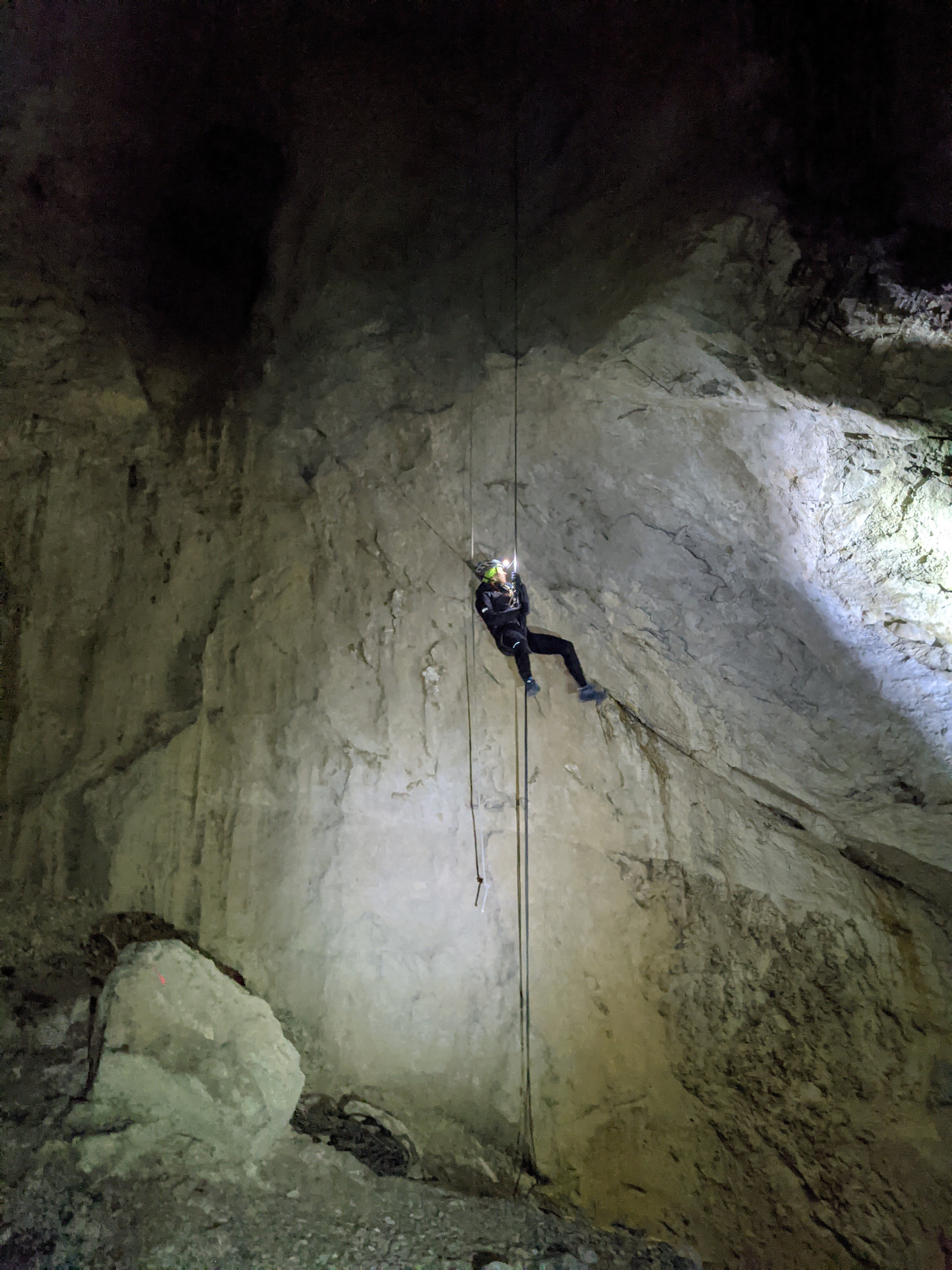
The 56 foot pitch, 17 m pitch

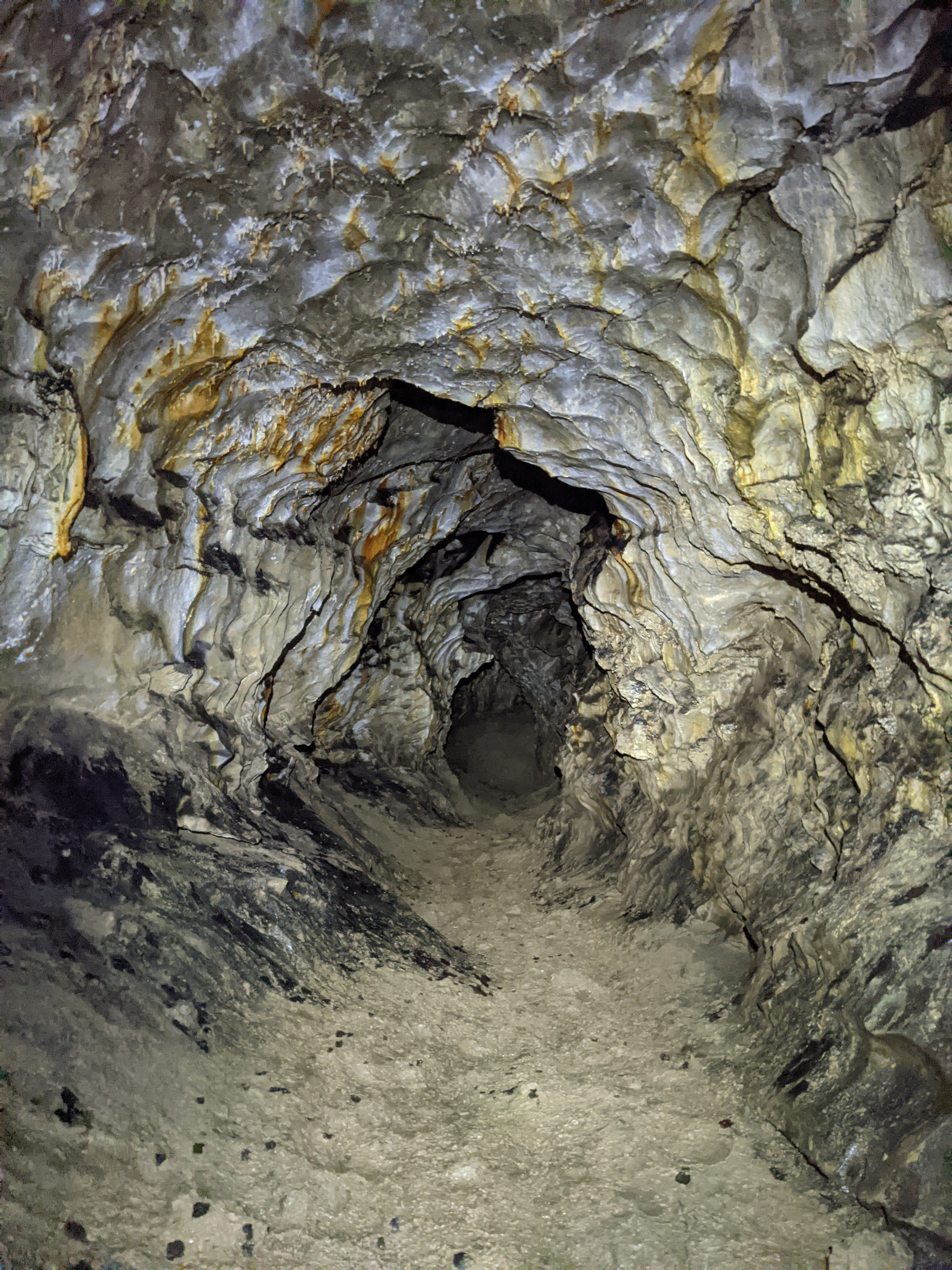
The Big Dipper
