= List of provincial parks of British Columbia Central Interior =

The list of provincial parks of the British Columbia Central Interior contains the provincial parks located within this geographic region of the province of British Columbia. It includes parks from the three regional districts of Bulkley-Nechako, Cariboo, and Fraser-Fort George. These parks are administered by BC Parks under the jurisdiction of the Ministry of Environment and Climate Change Strategy.

The most visited provincial park of this region is Mount Robson Provincial Park with 205,559 total visitors and 64,673 overnight campers during the 2017/2018 season.

== List of parks ==
Park name	Classification	Regional districts	Coordinates	Size		Established	Remarks
Park name	Classification	Regional districts	Coordinates	ha	acres	Established	Remarks
Ancient Forest/Chun T'oh Whudujut Provincial Park	Provincial Park; Protected Area	Fraser-Fort George	53°45′44″N 121°13′09″W	11,875	29,340	2016	Protects a portion of the North American inland temperate rainforest.
Arctic Pacific Lakes Provincial Park	Provincial Park	Fraser-Fort George	54°22′59″N 121°31′01″W	13,887	34,320	2000	
Atna River Provincial Park	Provincial Park; Protected Area	Bulkley-Nechako	53°59′13″N 127°53′53″W	21,092	52,120	2008	
Babine Lake Marine Provincial Park	Marine Provincial Park	Bulkley-Nechako	54°30′54″N 125°42′00″W	105	260	1993	
Babine Mountains Provincial Park	Provincial Park	Bulkley-Nechako	54°55′59″N 126°55′59″W	31,146	76,960	1984	
Babine River Corridor Provincial Park	Provincial Park	Bulkley-Nechako	55°36′00″N 127°01′59″W	15,359	37,950	1999	
Beaumont Provincial Park	Provincial Park	Bulkley-Nechako	54°03′00″N 124°37′01″W	178	440	1960	
Beaver Valley Provincial Park	Provincial Park	Cariboo	52°36′37″N 121°59′45″W	767	1,900	2013	
Big Creek Provincial Park	Provincial Park; Ecological Reserve	Thompson-Nicola	51°18′N 123°10′W	68,175	168,460	1990	
Bijoux Falls Provincial Park	Provincial Park	Fraser-Fort George	55°18′00″N 122°40′01″W	40	99	1956	
Bobtail Mountain Provincial Park	Provincial Park	Fraser-Fort George	53°40′01″N 123°24′00″W	1,360	3,400	2000	
Bowron Lake Provincial Park	Provincial Park	Cariboo	53°10′01″N 121°04′59″W	139,700	345,000	1961	
Bridge Lake Provincial Park	Provincial Park	Cariboo	51°28′59″N 120°42′00″W	405	1,000	1956	
Bull Canyon Provincial Park	Provincial Park	Cariboo	52°05′31″N 123°22′30″W	343	850	1993	
Burns Lake Provincial Park	Provincial Park	Bulkley-Nechako	54°12′00″N 125°43′01″W	65	160	2001	
Call Lake Provincial Park	Provincial Park	Bulkley-Nechako	54°45′50″N 127°05′28″W	62	150	1999	
Canim Beach Provincial Park	Provincial Park	Cariboo	51°49′01″N 120°52′01″W	6	15	1956	
Cariboo Mountains Provincial Park	Provincial Park	Cariboo	52°52′59″N 120°31′01″W	113,469	280,390	1995	
Cariboo Nature Provincial Park	Provincial Park	Cariboo	51°52′53″N 121°39′52″W	89	220	1965	
Cariboo River Provincial Park	Provincial Park	Cariboo	52°52′01″N 121°12′40″W	3,211	7,930	1995	
Carp Lake Provincial Park	Provincial Park	Fraser-Fort George	54°47′00″N 123°22′01″W	38,149	94,270	1973	
Cedar Point Provincial Park	Class C Provincial Park	Cariboo	52°34′41″N 121°32′10″W	8	20	1962	
Close To The Edge Provincial Park and Protected Area	Provincial Park; Protected Area	Fraser-Fort George	54°03′49″N 121°02′23″W	702	1,730	2001	Protects Close To The Edge cave.
Cottonwood River Provincial Park	Provincial Park	Cariboo	53°10′01″N 122°30′00″W	66	160	1956	
Crooked River Provincial Park	Provincial Park	Fraser-Fort George	54°28′30″N 122°40′59″W	963	2,380	1965	
Dahl Lake Provincial Park	Provincial Park	Fraser-Fort George	53°46′30″N 123°17′46″W	1,583	3,910	1981	
Dead Man’s Island Provincial Park	Provincial Park	Bulkley-Nechako	54°12′26″N 125°43′57″W	1	2.5	1933	One of the smallest provincial parks in British Columbia.
Donnely Lake Provincial Park	Provincial Park	Cariboo	51°45′16″N 120°40′24″W	814	2,010	2013	
Dragon Mountain Provincial Park	Provincial Park	Cariboo	52°52′58″N 122°20′15″W	1,773	4,380	2013	
Driftwood Canyon Provincial Park	Provincial Park	Bulkley-Nechako	54°49′34″N 127°01′19″W	21	52	1967	Protects fossil beds along its namesake creek.
Entiako Provincial Park	Provincial Park	Bulkley-Nechako	53°15′00″N 125°25′59″W	126,023	311,410	1999	
Erg Mountain Provincial Park	Provincial Park	Fraser-Fort George	53°34′16″N 120°54′29″W	1,011	2,500	2000	
Eskers Provincial Park	Provincial Park	Fraser-Fort George	54°04′01″N 123°10′01″W	4,044	9,990	1987	
Ethel F. Wilson Memorial Provincial Park	Memorial Provincial Park	Bulkley-Nechako	54°25′05″N 125°41′13″W	33	82	1953	
Evanoff Provincial Park	Provincial Park	Fraser-Fort George	54°05′03″N 121°20′16″W	1,473	3,640	2000	
Finger-Tatuk Provincial Park	Provincial Park	Bulkley-Nechako	53°29′38″N 124°12′58″W	17,151	42,380	1999	
Flat Lake Provincial Park	Provincial Park	Cariboo	51°30′04″N 121°31′01″W	4,275	10,560	1995	
Fort George Canyon Provincial Park	Provincial Park	Fraser-Fort George	53°40′59″N 122°43′01″W	178	440	2000	
François Lake Provincial Park	Provincial Park; Protected Area	Bulkley-Nechako	53°58′01″N 125°10′01″W	7,272	17,970	1999	
Fraser River Provincial Park	Provincial Park; Ecological Reserve	Fraser-Fort George	53°28′59″N 122°43′16″W	5,076	12,540	2000	
Heather-Dina Lakes Provincial Park	Provincial Park; Ecological Reserve	Fraser-Fort George	55°30′40″N 123°17′46″W	6,034	14,910	2001	
Horsefly Lake Provincial Park	Provincial Park	Cariboo	52°23′20″N 121°17′17″W	186	460	1974	
Itcha Ilgachuz Provincial Park	Provincial Park	Cariboo	52°42′00″N 124°49′59″W	109,063	269,500	1995	
Jackman Flats Provincial Park	Provincial Park	Fraser-Fort George	52°57′00″N 119°25′01″W	615	1,520	2000	Protects a unique sand dune ecosystem.
Junction Sheep Range Provincial Park	Provincial Park	Cariboo	51°48′00″N 122°25′19″W	4,774	11,800	1995	
Kakwa Provincial Park	Provincial Park; Protected Area	Fraser-Fort George	54.0443°N 120.3545°W	170,890	422,300	1987	Part of the Kakwa-Willmore Interprovincial Park.
Kluskoil Lake Provincial Park	Provincial Park	Cariboo	53°13′01″N 123°54′00″W	15,548	38,420	1995	
Lac La Hache Provincial Park	Provincial Park	Cariboo	51°51′32″N 121°38′17″W	24	59	1956	
Little Andrews Bay Marine Provincial Park	Marine Provincial Park	Bulkley-Nechako	53°48′06″N 126°36′40″W	102.1	252	1999	
Monkman Provincial Park	Provincial Park	Fraser-Fort George	54.5482°N 121.1578°W	62,867	155,350	1981	
Moose Valley Provincial Park	Provincial Park	Cariboo	51°39′N 121°39′W	2,500	6,200	1995	
Morice Lake Provincial Park	Provincial Park; Ecological Reserve	Bulkley-Nechako	53.9711°N 127.6458°W	52,788	130,440	2008	
Mount Blanchet Provincial Park	Provincial Park	Bulkley-Nechako	55°16′59″N 125°52′01″W	24,774	61,220	2001	
Mount Pope Provincial Park	Provincial Park	Bulkley-Nechako	54°29′38″N 124°20′31″W	2,030	5,000	2001	
Mount Robson Provincial Park	Provincial Park; Protected Area	Fraser-Fort George	53°02′02″N 119°13′55″W	225,777	557,910	1913	Protects Mount Robson, the highest peak of the Canadian Rockies. Part of the Canadian Rocky Mountain Parks World Heritage Site.
Mount Terry Fox Provincial Park	Provincial Park	Fraser-Fort George	52°56′42″N 119°15′29″W	1,930	4,800	1982	
Mudzenchoot Provincial Park	Provincial Park	Bulkley-Nechako	54°51′50″N 124°22′12″W	644	1,590	2001	
Nadina Mountain Provincial Park	Provincial Park	Bulkley-Nechako	54°05′56″N 126°52′56″W	2,789	6,890	2008	
Nation Lakes Provincial Park	Provincial Park	Bulkley-Nechako	55°27′29″N 125°24′00″W	19,398	47,930	2004	
Nazko Lake Provincial Park	Provincial Park	Cariboo	52°25′52″N 123°33′18″W	12,419	30,690	1995	
Nenikëkh/Nanika-Kidprice Provincial Park	Provincial Park	Bulkley-Nechako	53.9383°N 127.403°W	17,006	42,020	2008	
Netalzul Meadows Provincial Park	Provincial Park	Bulkley-Nechako	55°34′N 127°00′W	297	730	1999	
Nilkitkwa Lake Provincial Park	Provincial Park	Bulkley-Nechako	55°24′N 126°40′W	10.3	25	1999	
Nuntsi Provincial Park	Provincial Park	Cariboo	51°44′38″N 123°46′59″W	20,570	50,800	1995	
Old Man Lake Provincial Park	Provincial Park; Protected Area	Bulkley-Nechako	48°18′08″N 79°52′38″W	326	810	2008	
Omineca Provincial Park and Protected Area	Provincial Park; Protected Area	Bulkley-Nechako	55°51′47″N 124°38′02″W	135,434	334,660	2001	
Paarens Beach Provincial Park	Provincial Park	Bulkley-Nechako	54°25′16″N 124°22′41″W	50	120	1972	
Pine Le Moray Provincial Park	Provincial Park	Fraser-Fort George	55.3741°N 122.5624°W	43,245	106,860	2000	
Pinnacles Provincial Park	Provincial Park	Cariboo	52°58′44″N 122°33′29″W	124.39	307.4	1969	Protects a collection of prominent hoodoos.
Ptarmigan Creek Provincial Park and Protected Area	Provincial Park; Protected Area	Fraser-Fort George	53°29′35″N 120°53′24″W	4,633	11,450	2001	Protects the complete watershed of the east branch of Ptarmigan Creek, a tributary to the Fraser River.
Puntchesakut Lake Provincial Park	Provincial Park	Cariboo	52°58′59″N 122°55′59″W	38	94	1980	
Punti Island Provincial Park	Provincial Park	Cariboo	52°12′27″N 123°54′39″W	12	30	2013	
Purden Lake Provincial Park	Provincial Park	Fraser-Fort George	53°55′44″N 121°54′40″W	2,521	6,230	1971	
Rainbow Alley Provincial Park	Provincial Park	Bulkley-Nechako	55°20′06″N 126°38′28″W	110	270	1999	
Rainbow/Q'iwentem Provincial Park	Provincial Park	Cariboo	51°38′9″N 120°48′22″W	385	950	2013	
Rearguard Falls Provincial Park	Provincial Park	Fraser-Fort George	52°58′26″N 119°21′25″W	46	110	1991	
Red Bluff Provincial Park	Provincial Park	Bulkley-Nechako	54°51′14″N 126°10′52″W	148	370	1978	
Rubyrock Lake Provincial Park	Provincial Park	Bulkley-Nechako	54°41′10″N 125°20′46″W	41,221	101,860	2001	
Ruth Lake Provincial Park	Provincial Park	Cariboo	51°49′59″N 121°01′59″W	30	74	1959	
Schoolhouse Lake Provincial Park	Provincial Park	Cariboo	51°53′00″N 120°59′46″W	5,106	12,620	1995	
Slim Creek Provincial Park	Provincial Park	Fraser-Fort George	53°45′58″N 121°11′17″W	506	1,250	2000	
Small River Caves Provincial Park	Provincial Park	Fraser-Fort George	53°11′13″N 119°30′22″W	1,818	4,490	2000	Protects a remote cave system.
Sowchea Bay Provincial Park	Provincial Park	Fraser-Fort George	54°25′N 124°27′W	13	32	1989	
Stuart Lake Marine Provincial Park	Marine Provincial Park	Bulkley-Nechako	54°38′56″N 125°00′29″W	797	1,970	2001	
Stuart River Provincial Park	Provincial Park	Bulkley-Nechako	54°03′00″N 123°37′01″W	20,984	51,850	1999	
Sugarbowl - Grizzly Den Provincial Park	Provincial Park; Protected Area	Fraser-Fort George	53°51′05″N 121°35′57″W	24,765	61,200	2000	Protects the Grand Canyon of the Fraser.
Sutherland River Provincial Park and Protected Area	Provincial Park; Protected Area	Bulkley-Nechako	54°28′08″N 125°05′22″W	18,394	45,450	2000	
Takla Lake Marine Provincial Park	Provincial Park; Ecological Reserve	Bulkley-Nechako	55°07′44″N 125°39′22″W	1,170	2,900	1972	
Tazdli Wyiez Bin/Burnie-Shea Provincial Park	Provincial Park; Protected Area	Bulkley-Nechako	54.3379°N 127.556°W	36,881	91,130	2008	
Ten Mile Lake Provincial Park	Provincial Park	Cariboo	53°04′26″N 122°26′31″W	343	850	1962	
Three Sisters Lakes Provincial Park	Provincial Park	Fraser-Fort George	53°32′31″N 122°33′00″W	968	2,390	2000	
Titetown Provincial Park	Provincial Park	Cariboo	53°17′06″N 123°45′10″W	1,070	2,600	2013	Protects a collection of large kettle lakes.
Topley Landing Provincial Park	Provincial Park	Bulkley-Nechako	54°49′N 126°10′W	12	30	1964	
Trembleur Lake Provincial Park	Provincial Park	Bulkley-Nechako	54°49′48″N 125°14′06″W	57	140	2001	
Tsʼilʔos Provincial Park	Provincial Park	Cariboo	51°09′00″N 123°58′59″W	233,240	576,300	1994	
Tudyah Lake Provincial Park	Provincial Park	Fraser-Fort George	55°03′50″N 123°02′10″W	56	140	1981	
Tweedsmuir North Provincial Park and Protected Area	Provincial Park; Protected Area	Bulkley-Nechako	53°20′35″N 126°27′58″W	446,107	1,102,350	1938	
Tweedsmuir South Provincial Park	Provincial Park	Bulkley-Nechako	52°31′16″N 125°54′50″W	989,616	2,445,390	1938	Largest provincial park in British Columbia.
Tyhee Lake Provincial Park	Provincial Park	Bulkley-Nechako	54°42′29″N 127°02′20″W	33	82	1956	
Uncha Mountain Red Hills Provincial Park	Provincial Park	Bulkley-Nechako	53°58′26″N 125°32′02″W	9,421	23,280	2001	
Wells Gray Provincial Park	Provincial Park	Cariboo	51.951°N 120.296°W	541,516	1,338,120	1939	
Wendle Provincial Park	Class C Provincial Park	Cariboo	53°07′09″N 121°30′21″W	259	640	1941	
West Twin Provincial Park and Protected Area	Provincial Park; Protected Area	Fraser-Fort George	53°24′22″N 120°33′11″W	22,317	55,150	2000	
West Lake Provincial Park	Provincial Park	Fraser-Fort George	53°44′17″N 122°51′47″W	256	630	1981	
Whiskers Point Provincial Park	Provincial Park	Fraser-Fort George	54°54′14″N 122°56′20″W	116	290	1956	
White Pelican Provincial Park	Provincial Park	Cariboo	52°16′43″N 123°01′55″W	2,762.8	6,827	1971	Protects the only white pelican nesting colony in British Columbia.
Wistaria Provincial Park	Provincial Park	Bulkley-Nechako	53°51′29″N 126°19′12″W	40	99	1981	

== Gallery ==
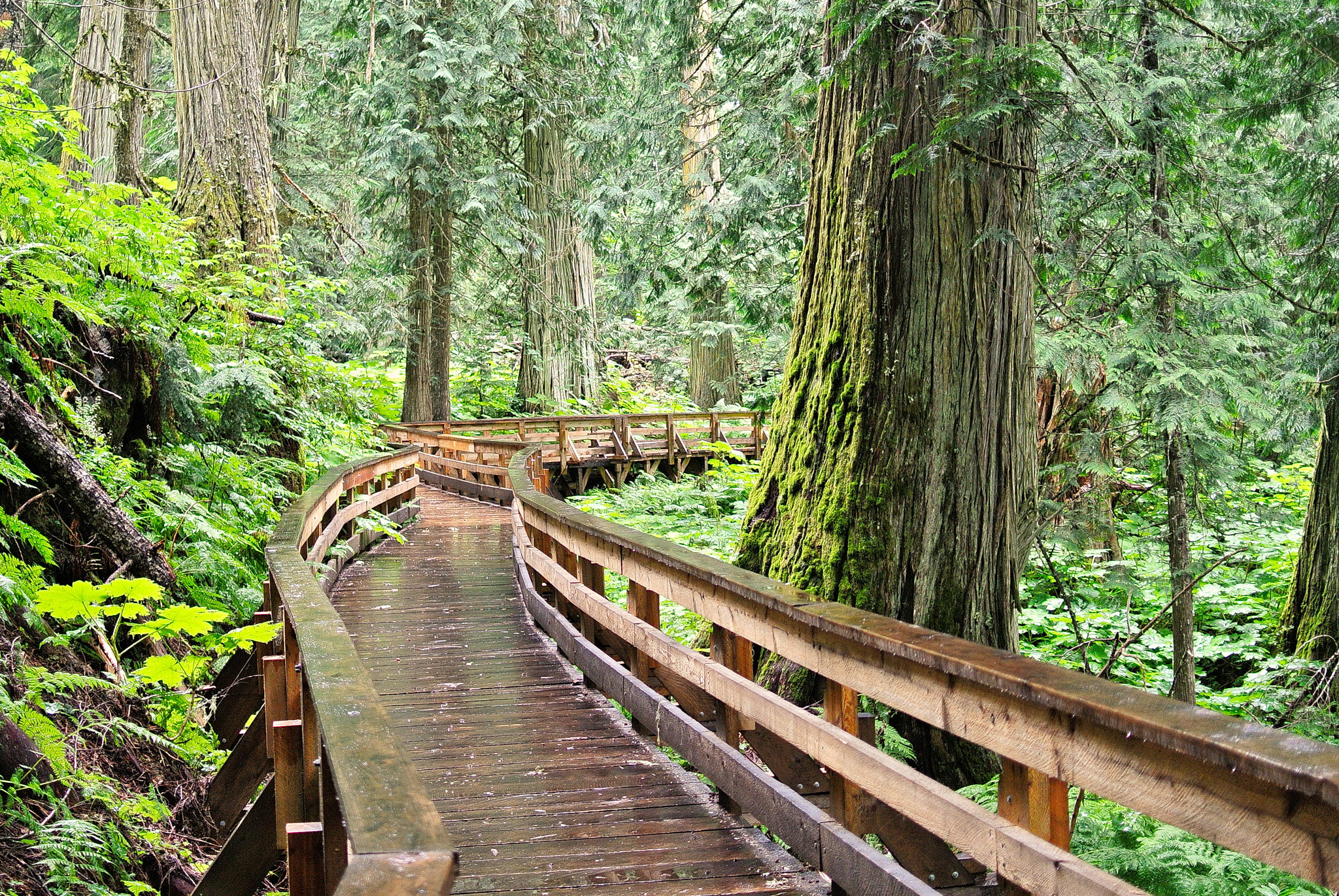
Ancient Forest/Chun T'oh Whudujut Provincial Park

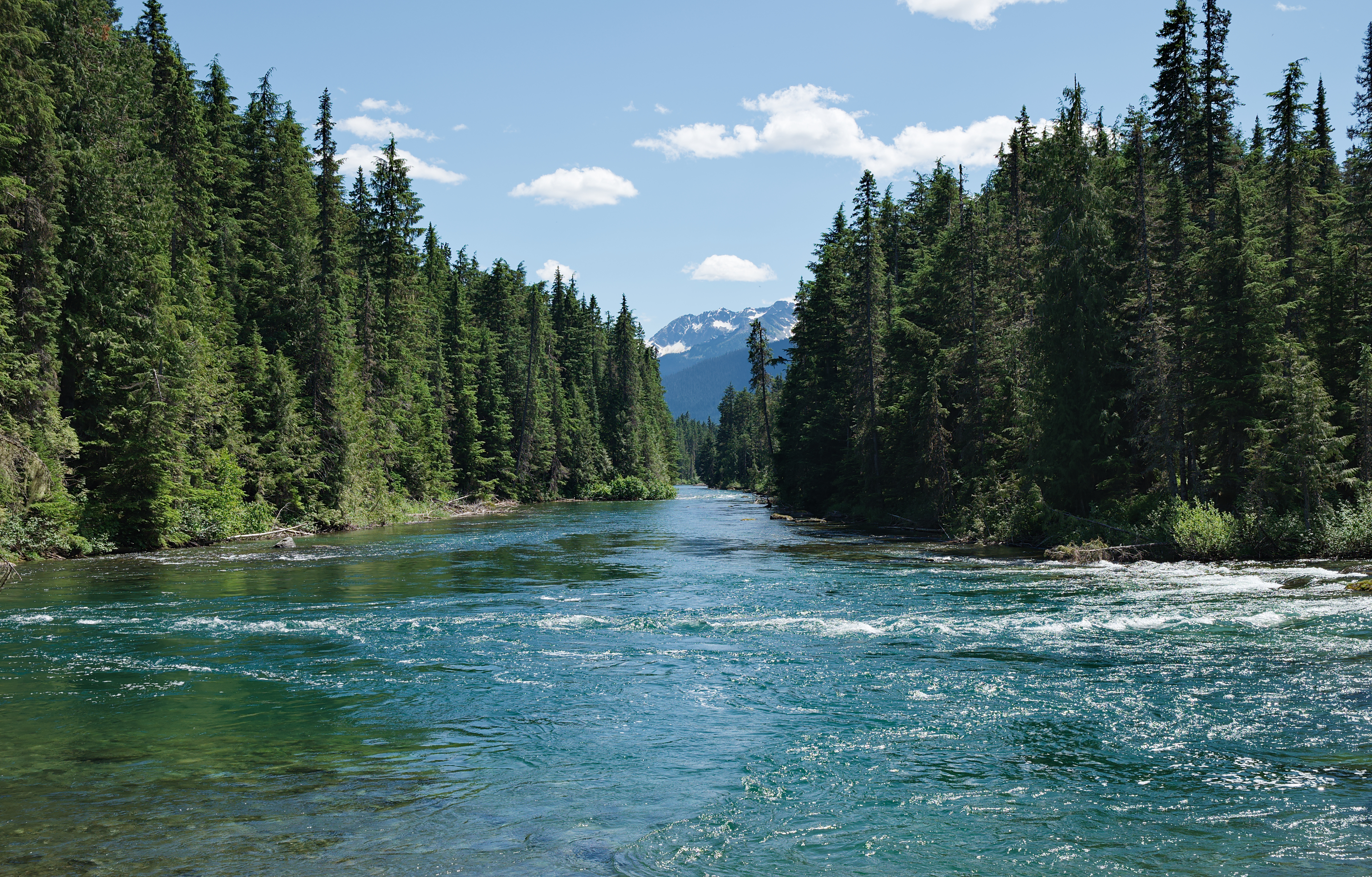
Bowron Lake Provincial Park

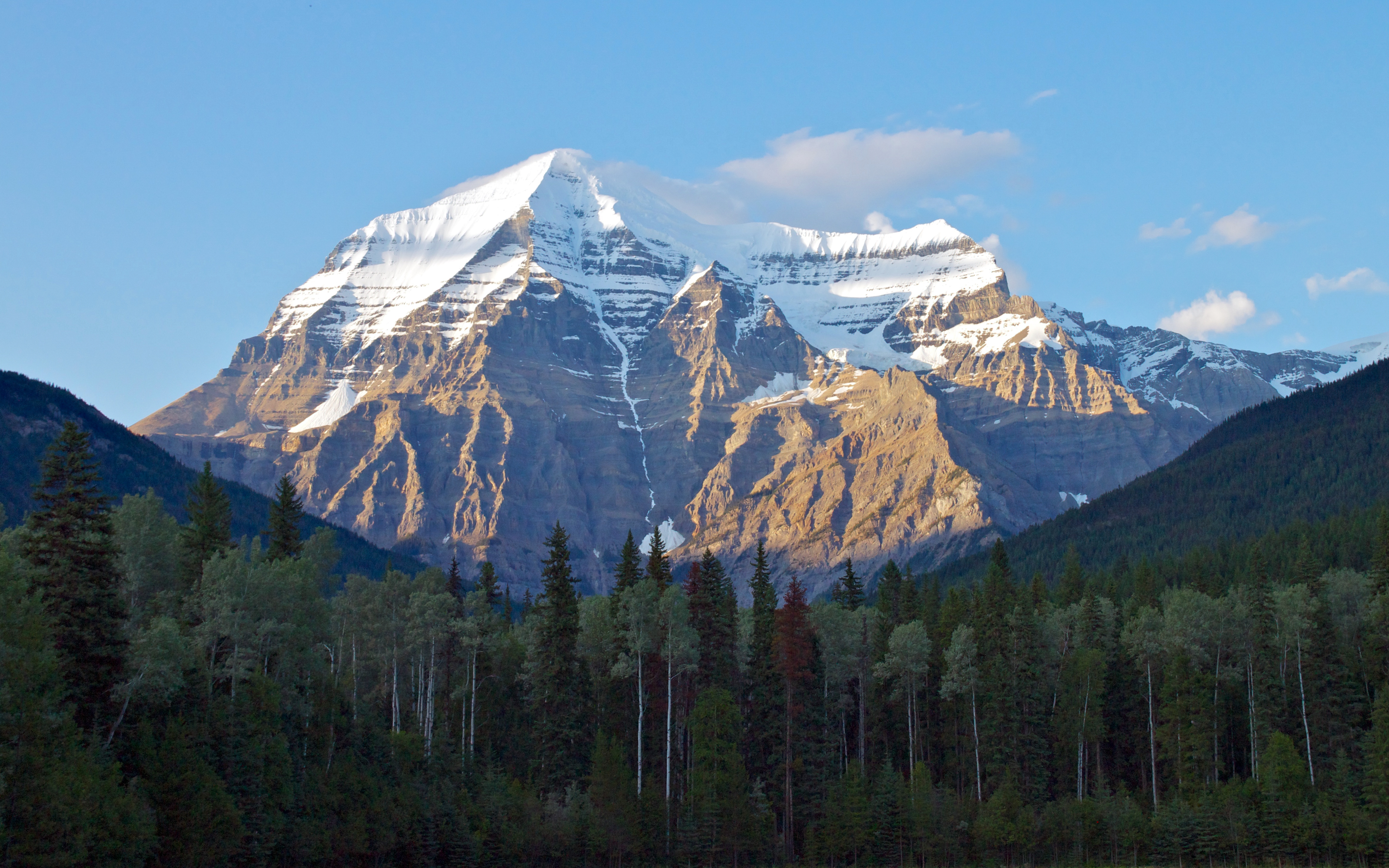
Mount Robson Provincial Park

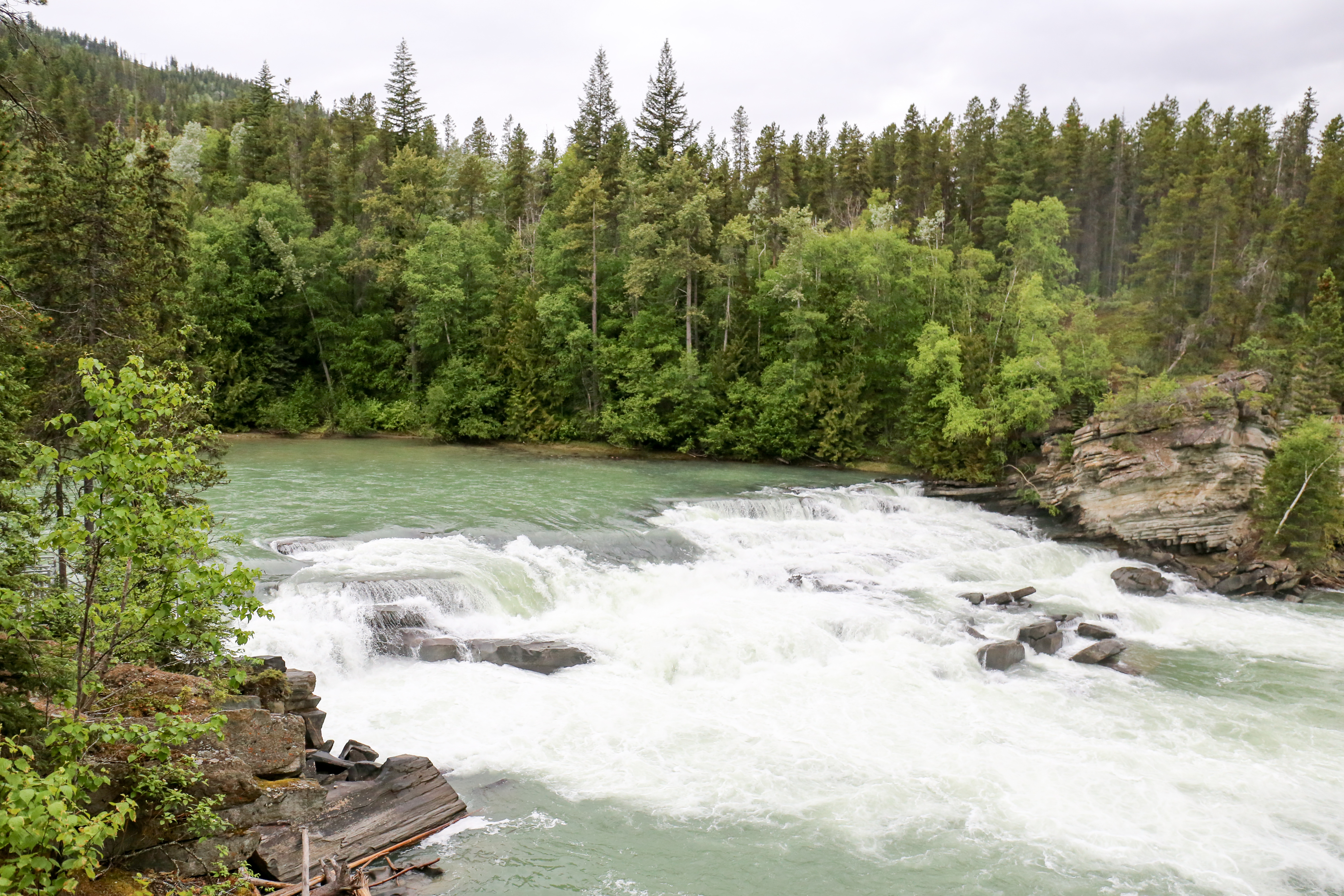
Rearguard Falls Provincial Park

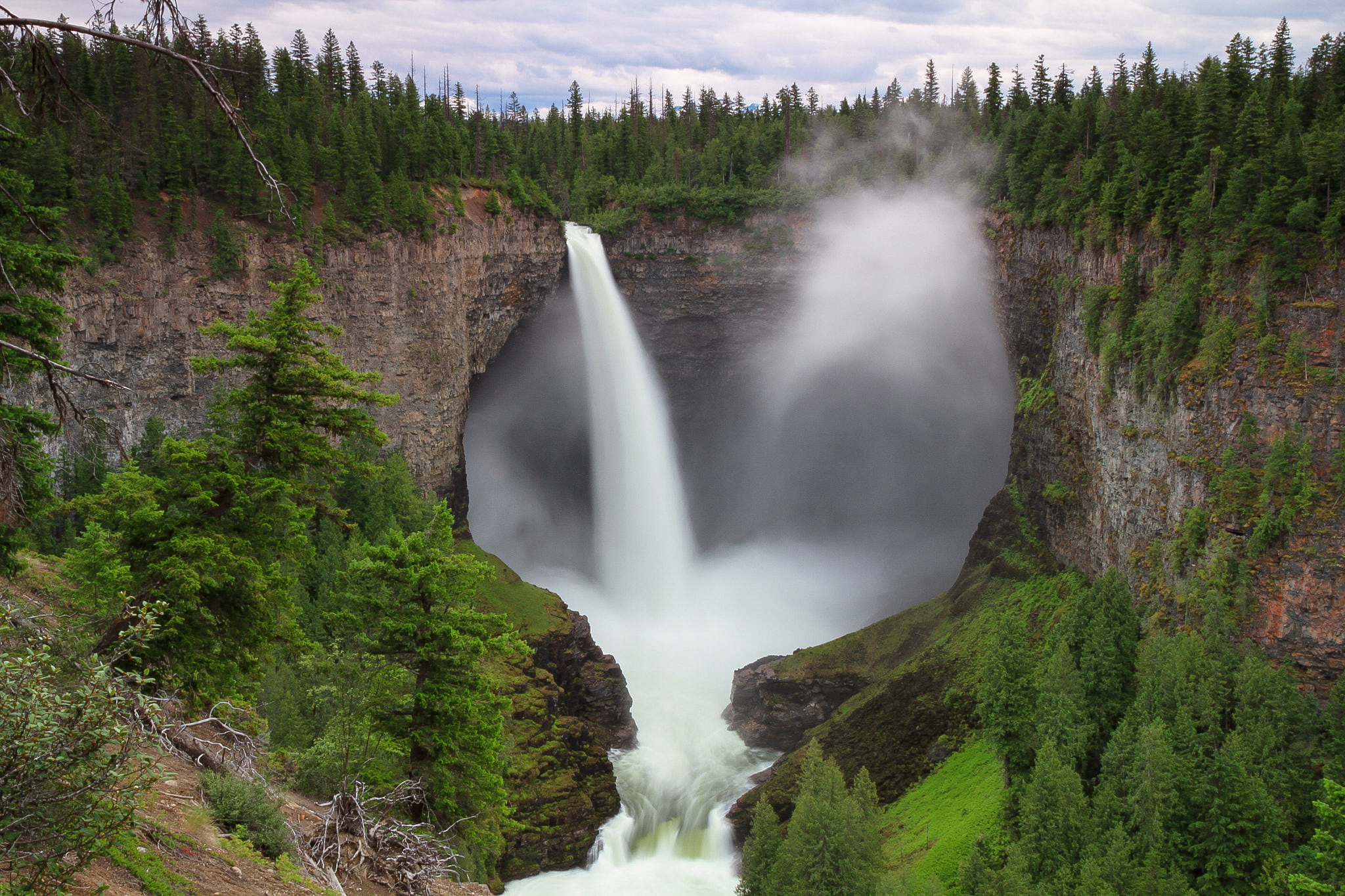
Wells Gray Provincial Park
