= Babine Lake Marine Provincial Park =

Provincial park in British Columbia, Canada

- IUCN category II (national park)
- Location within British Columbia
- Interactive map of Babine Lake Marine Provincial Park
- Location: Skeena/Omineca; British Columbia, Canada
- Coordinates: 54°30′39″N 125°42′20″W
- Area: 492 ha (1,220 acres)
- Established: January 1, 1993
- Governing body: BC Parks
- Website: Official website

Babine Lake Marine Park is on Babine Lake, which borders the Skeena and Omineca regions of central British Columbia. This provincial park comprises six separate sites around the lake. Vehicle access to the lake, via BC Highway 16 and Nilkitkwa forestry service road, is by road about 105 kilometres (65 mi) northeast of Smithers; via BC Highway 16 and Central Babine Lake Highway, is about 132 kilometres (82 mi) east of Smithers; or via Babine Lake Road, is about 20 kilometres (12 mi) northeast of Burns Lake.

== Earlier Pendleton Bay ==
Pendleton Bay was named after a family who pre-empted around 1914. After World War II, logging activity expanded. Many First Nations people seeking employment relocated from along the lake. In the late 1940s, the federal government built a large wharf to handle freight traffic.

In 1950–51, the school opened. That decade, a two-room teacherage was erected. A general store and café operated.

In 1963, indigenous children were integrated into the provincial three-room school.

In 1971, the school closed. That decade, the final sawmill closed. Nowadays, most residents are retired or seasonal occupants.

== Park profile ==
The province established sites at Pendleton Bay (37 hectares (91 acres)) in May 1993 and Smithers Landing (121 hectares (300 acres)) in June 1993. Sites added (334 hectares (830 acres)) in April 2001 were Sandpoint, Pierre Creek, Hook (Deep) Bay, and Pinkut Creek. The combined total is 492 hectares (1,220 acres).

== Park facilities ==
The gravel logging road from Burns Lake to Pendleton Bay branches to Pinkut Creek. The former provides the only public boat launch on the lake. A fish hatchery borders the latter site. The remaining sites are accessible by water or hiking trail. Seasonal fishing for rainbow and lake trout is popular. The lake is suitable for canoes, kayaks, and motorboats. Sites have picnicking areas and generally accommodate camping.

== Climate ==
Climate data for Babine Lake Marine Provincial Park
Month	Jan	Feb	Mar	Apr	May	Jun	Jul	Aug	Sep	Oct	Nov	Dec	Year
Record high °C (°F)	10.5 (50.9)	12.0 (53.6)	15.5 (59.9)	20.5 (68.9)	30.0 (86.0)	33.3 (91.9)	33.9 (93.0)	32.0 (89.6)	33.5 (92.3)	30.0 (86.0)	21.5 (70.7)	14.5 (58.1)	12.0 (53.6)
Mean daily maximum °C (°F)	−4.1 (24.6)	−1.7 (28.9)	3.1 (37.6)	8.5 (47.3)	13.7 (56.7)	17.4 (63.3)	20.0 (68.0)	19.8 (67.6)	15.1 (59.2)	8.2 (46.8)	1.1 (34.0)	−2.5 (27.5)	8.2 (46.8)
Daily mean °C (°F)	−7.3 (18.9)	−5.6 (21.9)	−1.6 (29.1)	3.4 (38.1)	8.1 (46.6)	12.3 (54.1)	14.7 (58.5)	14.4 (57.9)	10.1 (50.2)	4.5 (40.1)	−1.8 (28.8)	−5.4 (22.3)	3.8 (38.8)
Mean daily minimum °C (°F)	−10.5 (13.1)	−9.5 (14.9)	−6.2 (20.8)	−1.7 (28.9)	2.6 (36.7)	7.0 (44.6)	9.4 (48.9)	8.8 (47.8)	5.1 (41.2)	0.7 (33.3)	−4.6 (23.7)	−8.3 (17.1)	−0.6 (30.9)
Record low °C (°F)	−44.4 (−47.9)	−38.3 (−36.9)	−33.3 (−27.9)	−20.0 (−4.0)	−5.6 (21.9)	−2.2 (28.0)	0.0 (32.0)	−1.7 (28.9)	−5.0 (23.0)	−20.0 (−4.0)	−31.5 (−24.7)	−36.7 (−34.1)	−44.4 (−47.9)
Average precipitation mm (inches)	44.0 (1.73)	28.5 (1.12)	25.4 (1.00)	25.2 (0.99)	37.7 (1.48)	53.0 (2.09)	43.7 (1.72)	39.8 (1.57)	40.4 (1.59)	47.9 (1.89)	44.3 (1.74)	40.9 (1.61)	470.8 (18.54)
Average rainfall mm (inches)	4.9 (0.19)	3.0 (0.12)	5.8 (0.23)	18.7 (0.74)	37.1 (1.46)	53.0 (2.09)	43.7 (1.72)	39.8 (1.57)	40.4 (1.59)	40.7 (1.60)	16.0 (0.63)	4.5 (0.18)	307.5 (12.11)
Average snowfall cm (inches)	44.0 (17.3)	28.5 (11.2)	19.6 (7.7)	6.6 (2.6)	0.6 (0.2)	0.0 (0.0)	0.0 (0.0)	0.0 (0.0)	0.0 (0.0)	7.2 (2.8)	28.3 (11.1)	36.5 (14.4)	163.3 (64.3)
Source: Environment Canada

== Other protected areas on the lake ==
- Red Bluff Provincial Park on the southwest shore is 148 hectares (370 acres).
- Topley Landing Provincial Park on the southwest shore is 12 hectares (30 acres).

== Other protected areas in the vicinity ==
- Nilkitkwa Lake Provincial Park, which lies north of the lake, is 10 hectares (25 acres).
- Rainbow Alley Provincial Park, which lies north of the lake, is 110 hectares (270 acres).
- Ethel F. Wilson Memorial Provincial Park, which lies southwest of the lake, is 33 hectares (82 acres).
- Sutherland River Provincial Park and Protected Area, which lies east of the lake, is 18,394 hectares (45,450 acres).

== Maps ==
- "Standard Oil BC map". www.davidrumsey.com. 1937.
- "Shell BC map". www.davidrumsey.com. 1956.
- Babine Lake Marine Park sites map. 2003.
