= Longworth Peak =

Mountain in British Columbia, Canada

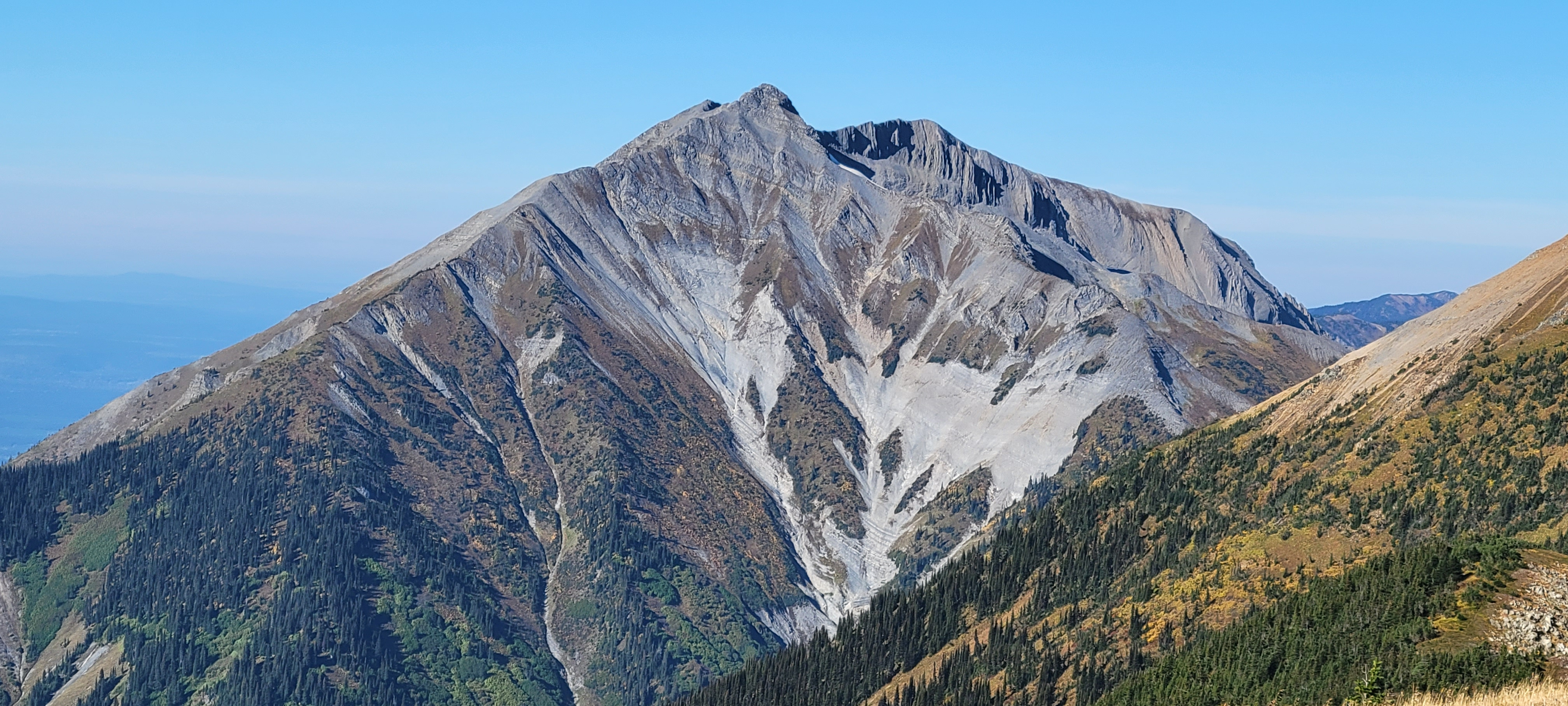

Highest point
- Elevation: 2,091 m (6,860 ft)
- Prominence: 1,265 m (4,150 ft)
- Parent peak: Mount Sir Alexander
- Isolation: 27.65 km (17.18 mi) to Kisano Mountain
- Listing: Mountains of British Columbia
- Coordinates: 53°55′57″N 121°21′52″W

Geography
- Location within British Columbia Location within Canada
- Location: Robson Valley; British Columbia, Canada
- District: Cariboo Land District
- Parent range: McGregor Range
- Topo map: NTS 93H14 Penny

Longworth Peak is a 2,091-metre (6,860 ft) mountain in the McGregor Range of the McGregor Plateau in Northern British Columbia. It is the highest peak in the McGregor Range.

Located between the Fraser River and the Torpy River, the peak is rocky with no glaciers.

The peak rises above the unincorporated hamlet of Longworth, BC and is a popular hiking destination. There is an abandoned fire lookout near the summit.

The British Columbia Ministry of Environment operates an automated snow weather station on the south west side of the mountain at an elevation of 1,740m installed in 2016.
