= Close to the Edge (disambiguation) =

Close to the Edge is the fifth album by the British progressive rock band Yes.

Close to the Edge may also refer to:

- "Close to the Edge" (song), a 1972 song from the Yes album of the same name
- Close to the Edge (Blessid Union of Souls album), 2008
- Close to the Edge (Diamond Rio album), or the title song
- Close To The Edge Provincial Park and Protected Area, British Columbia, Canada
  - Close to the Edge (cave), a cave in the park
- "Close to the Edge", one of the short stories in Terry Pratchett's book The Colour of Magic
- Close to the Edge (TV series), a British structured reality television show

== See also ==
- "Closer to the Edge", a 2010 song by Thirty Seconds to Mars
