= Ancient Forest/Chun T'oh Whudujut Provincial Park and Protected Area =

Provincial park and protected area in British Columbia, Canada

- IUCN category II (national park)
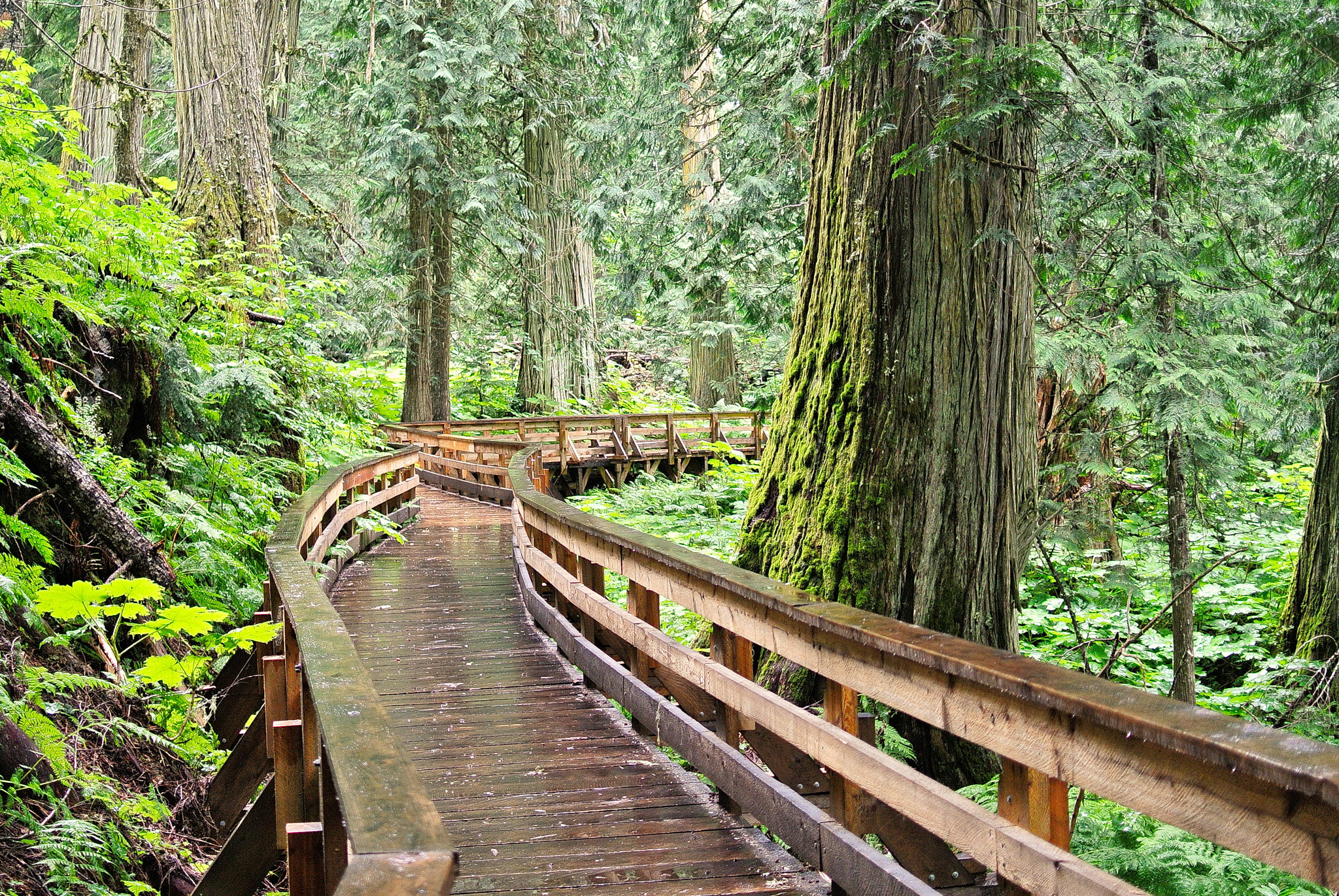
- Nowell Senior Universal Boardwalk

- Location within British Columbia
- Interactive map of Ancient Forest/Chun T'oh Whudujut Provincial Park and Protected Area
- Location: Fraser-Fort George RD, British Columbia, Canada
- Nearest city: Prince George
- Coordinates: 53°45′44″N 121°13′09″W
- Area: 11,875 ha (45.85 sq mi)
- Designation: Class A Provincial Park; Protected Area
- Established: 19 May 2016
- Governing body: BC Parks
- Website: Ancient Forest/Chun T'oh Whudujut

Ancient Forest/Chun T'oh Whudujut Provincial Park and Protected Area is a provincial park and protected area located in the Regional District of Fraser-Fort George in the Canadian province of British Columbia. The park was established on 19 May 2016 to protect a portion of the North American inland temperate rainforest, the only inland temperate rainforest in the world.

== Description ==
The park is located just off BC Highway 16 about 114 kilometres (71 mi) east of Prince George. The park is about 12 kilometres (7.5 mi) southwest of Sugarbowl-Grizzly Den Provincial Park and Protected Area and directly borders Slim Creek Provincial Park. The park contains a number of trees estimated to be over 1,000 years old.

== History ==
In 2018, the provincial government and Lheidli T'enneh Nation signed a memorandum of understanding to work together on the planning and management of the park.

On 6 July 2020, the Lheidli T'enneh Nation announced that both the provincial and federal government are contributing funds toward an $8.7 million development project to improve park facilities and build an interpretative centre sharing Lheidli T'enneh culture with visitors.

== See also ==
- List of provincial parks of British Columbia Central Interior
