= Wilson Park =

Wilson Park or variant, may refer to:

== United States ==
- Wilson Park, Baltimore, Maryland
- Wilson Park, Philadelphia, Pennsylvania
- Wilson Park Historic District, Fayetteville, Arkansas
- Wilson Commons Park, Washoe County, Nevada
- Wilson State Park (Michigan), Harrison, Michigan
- Wilson State Park (Kansas), Russell County, Kansas
- Wilson-Tuscarora State Park, Niagara County, New York
- Wilson Woods Park, Westchester, New York
- Justin P. Wilson Cumberland Trail State Park, Tennessee
- Wilson Park, a resort in Okolona, Mississippi

== Other ==
- Wilson Botanic Park, Berwick, Victoria, Australia
- Wilsons Promontory National Park, Victoria, Australia
- Wilsons Promontory Marine National Park, Victoria, Australia
- Ethel F. Wilson Memorial Provincial Park, British Columbia, Canada
- Maryon Wilson Park, Greenwich, England, United Kingdom

== See also ==
- Wilson Botanic Garden, Costa Rica
- Wilson's Creek National Battlefield Park, MI, USA
- Wilson Mountain Reservation, MA, USA
