= White pelican =

White pelican may refer to:

== Fauna ==
- American white pelican, Pelecanus erythrorhynchos
- Great white pelican, Pelecanus onocrotalus

== Other ==
- White Pelican Provincial Park in British Columbia, Canada
