= Evanoff Provincial Park =

Provincial park in British Columbia

- IUCN category III (natural monument or feature)
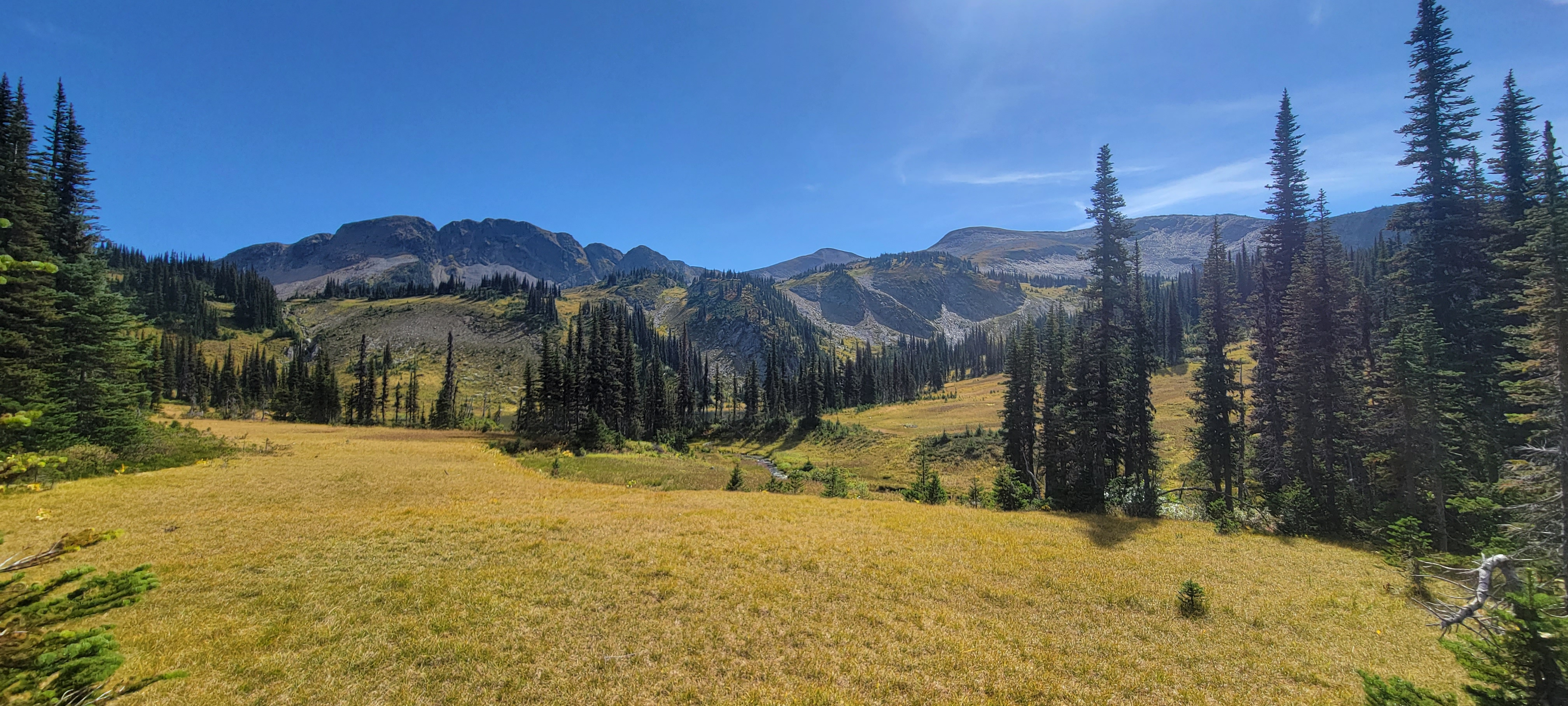
- Evanoff Provincial Park

- Location within British Columbia
- Interactive map of Evanoff Provincial Park
- Location: Fraser-Fort George, British Columbia, Canada
- Coordinates: 54°05′01″N 121°20′17″W
- Area: 1,473 ha (5.69 sq mi)
- Established: June 29, 2000
- Governing body: BC Parks

Evanoff Provincial Park is a provincial park in British Columbia, Canada.

== Geography ==
The park is situated in the McGregor Range, a sub-range of the McGregor Plateau. This park protects one of the most remarkable caves, the nationally significant Fang Cave complex, which includes the ninth longest cave in Canada. Other caves include the Tooth Decave and Window on the West.

The park also provides a scenic, easily accessible destination for backcountry recreation. It includes picturesque alpine bowls, three small alpine lakes, and distinctive limestone pinnacles and ridges. Two separate trails, the Fang Trail and Torpy Trail provide access to small alpine basins, with a connection over Fang Mountain. The Torpy Trail continues outside the park to Torpy Mountain.

== See also ==
- Close To The Edge Provincial Park and Protected Area
