= North American inland temperate rainforest =

7 million hectare disjunct temperate rainforest in Canada and the United States

North American Inland Temperate Rainforest
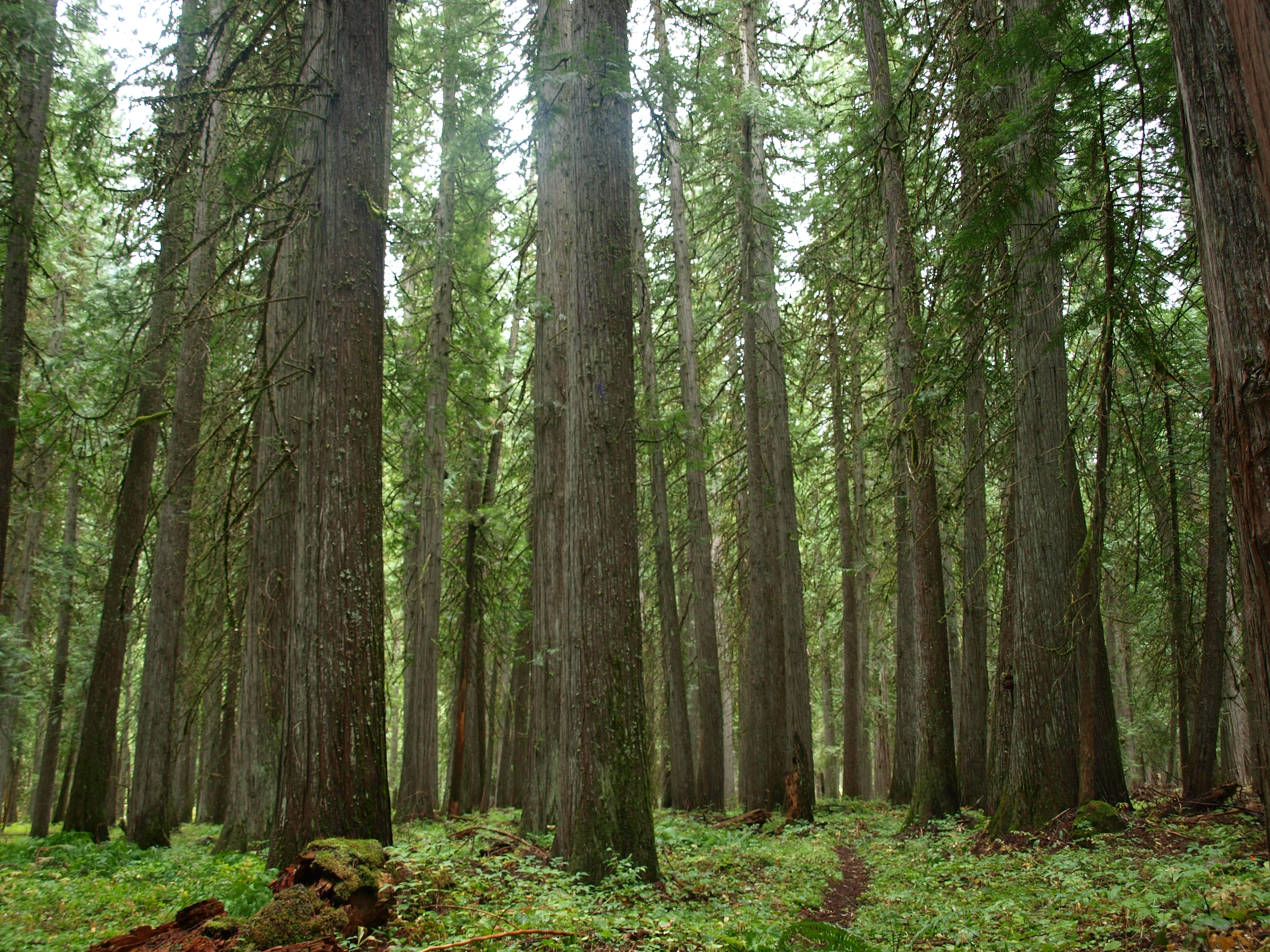
- Inland temperate rainforest of Moose Creek in Selway–Bitterroot Wilderness, Idaho

Ecology
- Realm: Nearctic
- Biome: Temperate coniferous forests

Geography
- Area: 70,000 km^{2} (27,000 sq mi)
- Countries: Canada; United States
- States: British Columbia; Idaho; Montana; Washington

The North American inland temperate rainforest is a 7 million hectare disjunct temperate rainforest spreading over parts of British Columbia in Canada as well as Washington, Idaho and Montana on the US side. Its patches are located on the windward slopes of the Rocky Mountains and the Columbia Mountains, extending roughly over 1000km from 54° North to 45° North. It is one of the largest inland temperate rainforests in the world.

== General description ==
=== Setting and extension ===
The North American inland rainforest is located in the so-called interior wet-belt, approximately 500-700 km inland from the Pacific coast on western, windward mountain slopes and valley bottoms of the Columbia Mountains and the Rocky Mountains. The interior wet-belt refers to a discontinuous band of humid forest patches, that are scattered over 1000 km between Purden Lake in Canada’s British Columbia (54° north) and Montana and Idaho's Bitterroot Mountains and Idaho’s Salmon River Mountains (45° north). It is closely associated with the North Central Rockies forests ecoregion designated by the World Wildlife Fund, which extends over a similar range but incorporates various non-temperate rainforest ecosystems.

=== Recognition as a rainforest ===
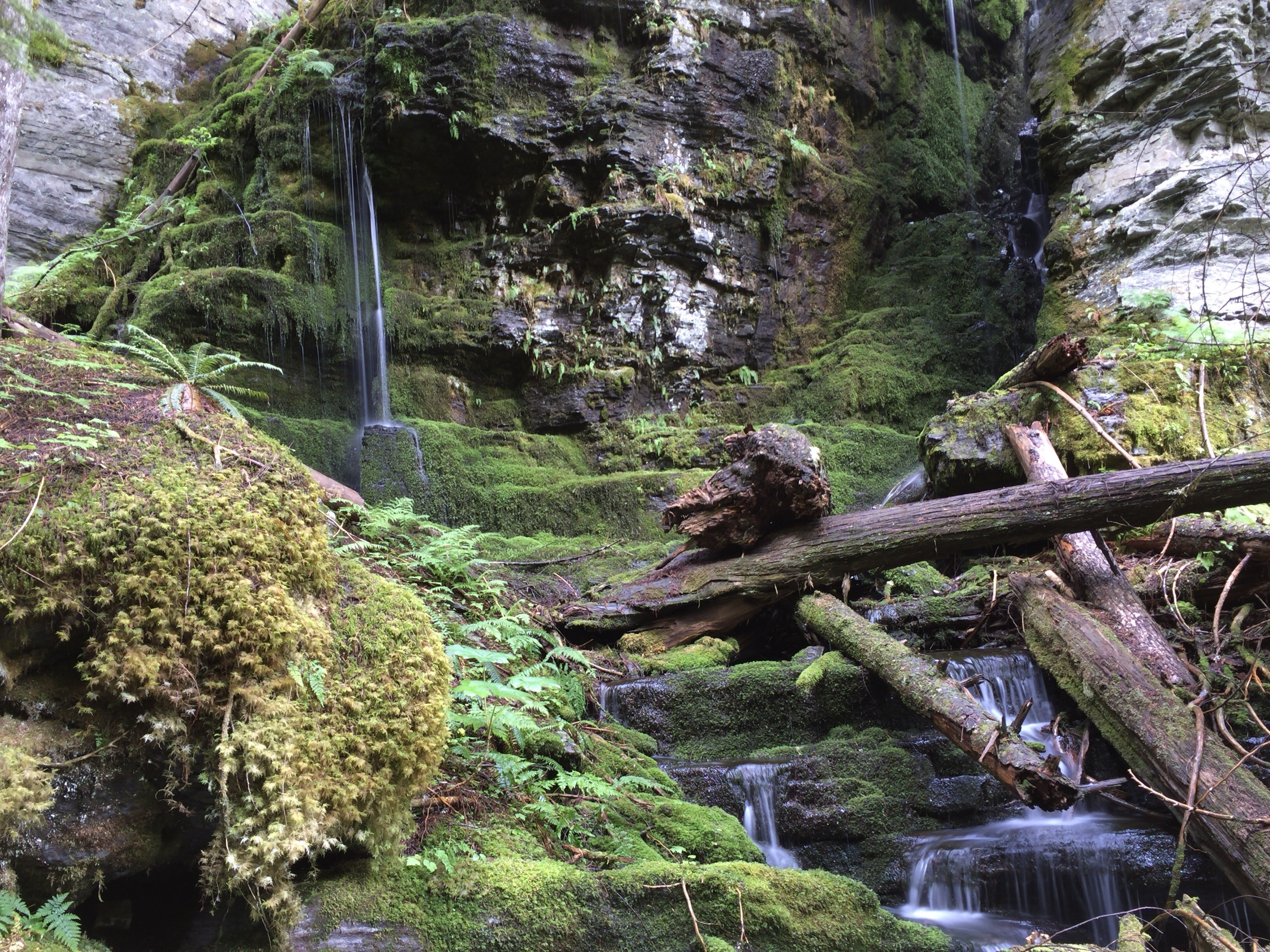
Coal Creek, Coeur d'Alene National Forest, Idaho

The North American inland temperate rainforest region is one of seven definitive temperate rainforest regions according to the Rainforest Distribution Model by Dominick DellaSala, next to

- the Pacific temperate rainforests
- the Valdivian temperate rainforest
- the Japanese temperate rainforest
- the Eastern Canadian temperate rainforest
- the European rainforest relicts
- and the Australasian temperate rainforest, including the Tasmanian temperate rainforest and temperate rainforests in Eastern Australia and New Zealand.

It has been started to be recognized as an “inland counterpart” of the coastal Pacific temperate rainforest extending from Washington state up to south-central Alaska. This is mainly, because the Inland rainforests share a great number of oceanic lichen species – which is remarkable, considering its distance from the coastline.

== Climate ==
=== Temperature ===
The general temperature pattern in the Inland rainforests in relation to its Pacific Northwestern counterpart can be summarized as: colder winters and warmer summers. In northern Idaho rainforest patches along the Clearwater River, a mean annual temperature of 5.4°C has been measured. In British Columbian Inland rainforest areas, the mean annual temperature ranges from 2.7 to 4.5°C. In the coldest months, the mean temperature of these region lies between -8 and -9.5°C.

=== Precipitation patterns ===
In general, the inland rainforest patches are restricted to areas with extraordinarily humid climate. For most of the year, pacific storm systems and maritime air masses moved into the interior by the prevailing westerlies create a zone of high precipitation when intersecting with the longitudinally oriented mountain ranges of that area (see Rocky Mountains, Columbia Mountains). This pattern changes in the southern regions during the summer months, when winds from Canada and the Great Plains dominate. This results in a substantially lower average rainfall in July and August in the southern rainforest patches than in the rest of the year, leading to a generally drier summer than in the North where the summers are cool and wet. In general, mean annual precipitation ranges between 700 and 1,500mm. For British Columbian rainforest patches, the mean annual precipitation varies between 788mm and 1,240mm. Because of low winter temperatures, winter precipitation generally falls as snow. Snowpack melting and a relatively high precipitation in early summer offset any potential drying effect caused by the colder winters and warmer summers.

== Flora ==
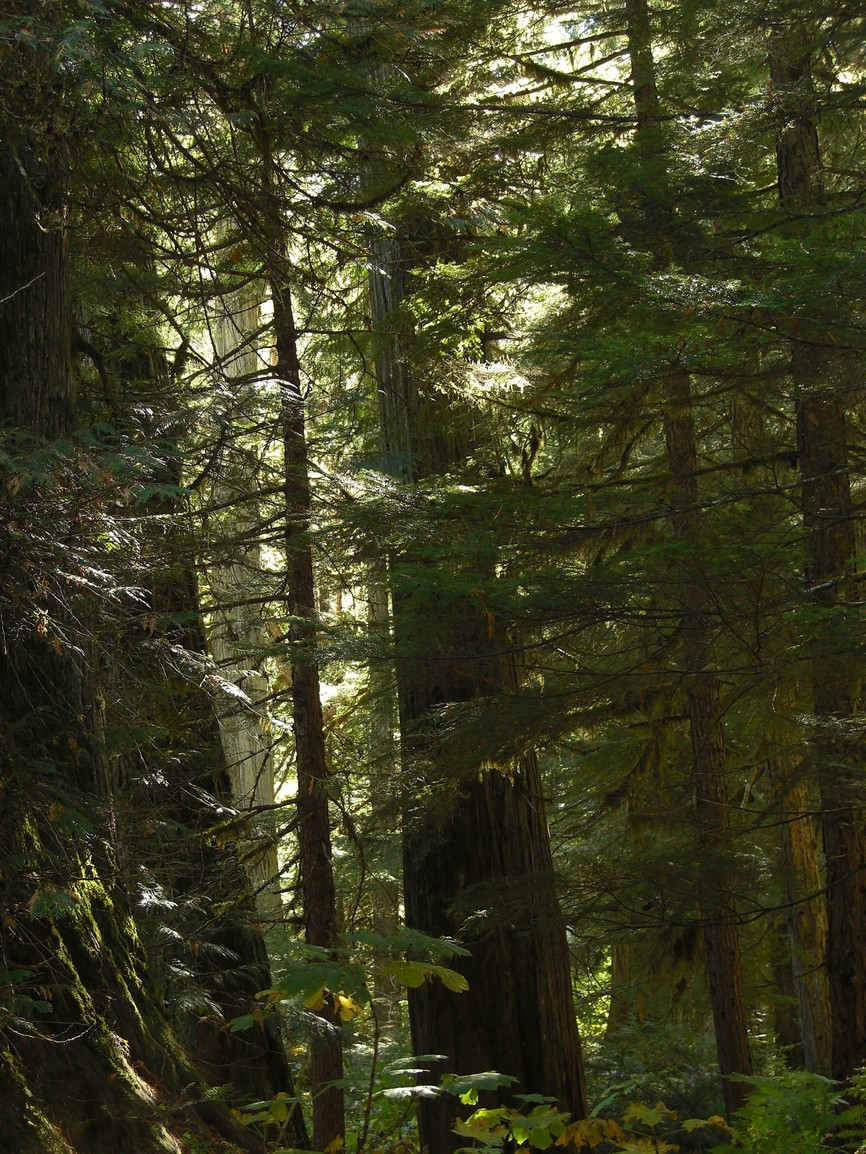
The Incomappleux River Valley of British Columbia hosts a rich collection of old-growth temperate rainforest

The inland rainforest patches are habitat for a variety of tree species. Probably the first species to colonize the northern regions after the last deglaciation was the lodgepole pine (Pinus contorta). The oldest stands however are usually dominated by western red cedar (Thuja plicata), which are also the oldest individuals in these forests. Western red cedar and Western hemlock (Tsuga heterophylla) are the most common tree species in low elevation inland rainforest patches, while the high elevation rainforest regions of British Columbia are dominated by Engelmann spruce (Picea engelmannii) and subalpine fir (Abies lasiocarpa). In northern Idaho rainforest patches, grand fir (Abies grandis) and red alder (Alnus rubra) seem to play an important role.

In Canada, red cedar and hemlock domination has led to the classification of the inland rainforest areas as belonging to the Interior Cedar-Hemlock Biogeoclimatic zone (ICH). In the United States, the inland rainforest regions are also classified as significant habitat types for western redcedar and western hemlock.

Because of their humid climate, the inland rainforest patches support the establishment of oceanic species that would typically be expected to grow in maritime and coastal environments. Examples for vascular oceanic species include deer fern (Blechnum spicant) and red huckleberry (Vaccinium parviflorum). A large number of epiphytes occur, such as hanging moss (Antitrichia curtipendula) settling on trees and various oceanic lichen genera (such as Chaenotheca, Chaenothecopsis, Collema, Fuscopannaria, Lichinodium, Lobaria, Nephroma, Parmeliella, Polychidium, Pseudocyphellaria, Sphaerophorus, and Sticta). Roughly 40% of the lichen found in the Pacific northwestern rainforest are also found in the inland rainforest. Because of their unique occurrence only in the specific climatic conditions provided by the inland rainforests, oceanic lichen has been used as an indicator for the location of these forest patches.

== Fauna ==
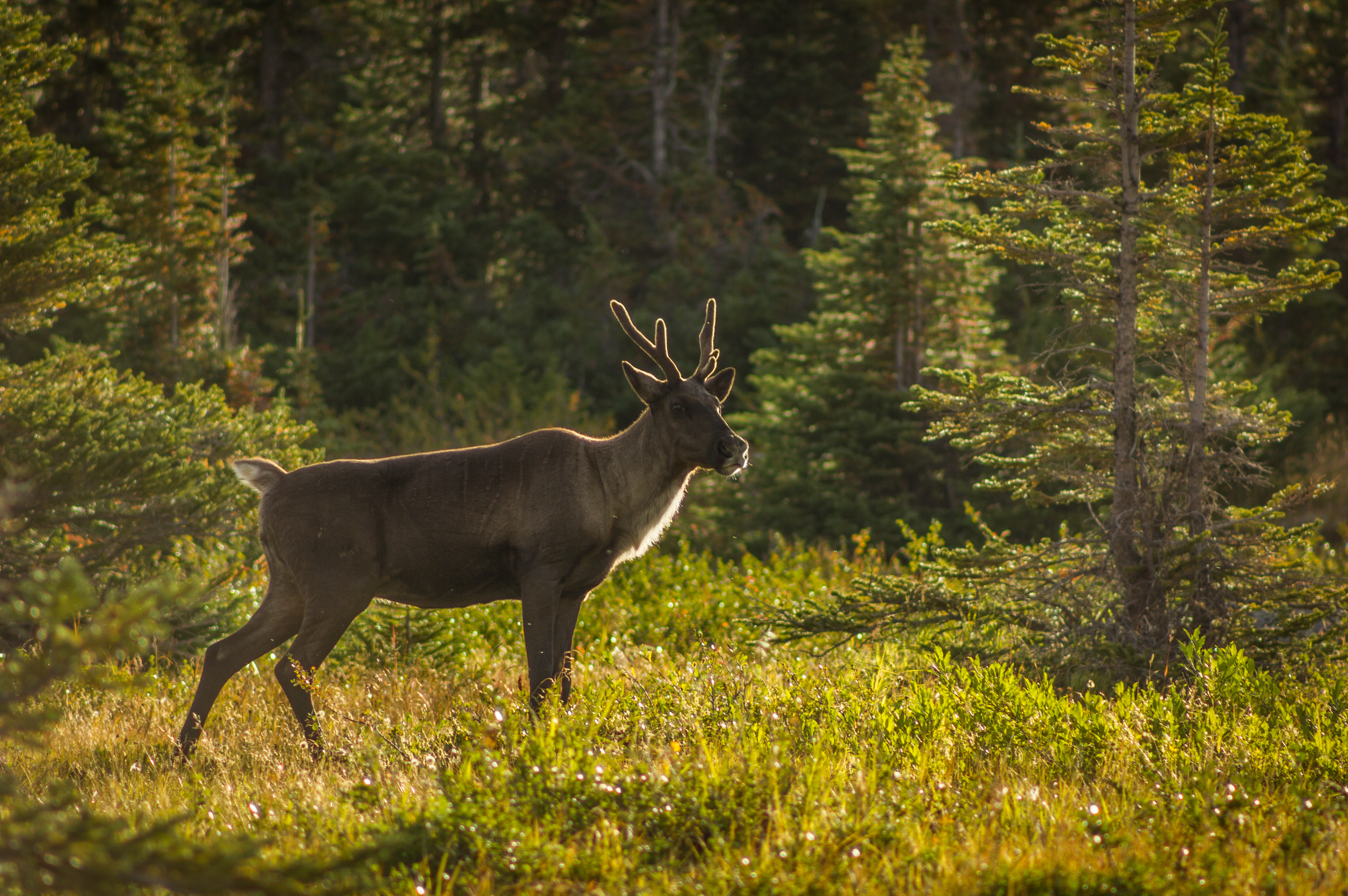
Mountain-type Woodland Caribou

The inland rainforest regions provide habitat for a large number of carnivores, including black bears (Ursus americanus), grizzly bears (Ursus arctos), grey wolf (Canis lupus), cougar (Puma concolor), lynx (Lynx lynx) and wolverine (Gulo gulo).

The most characteristic animal for these forests is the mountain caribou (Rangifer tarandus), also referred to as woodland caribou, which is currently listed as an endangered species by the U.S. Fish and Wildlife Service. The reasons for this endangerment are complex: Mountain caribou rely heavily on oceanic hair lichen as main food source during the winter, when ground vegetation is out of reach due to the immense accumulation of snow (2-5m) in the mountainous regions. Because of an increase in logging, the old-growth habitat for these lichen species are diminishing. Another problem is the increasing temperatures: due to a shift towards warmer climate conditions, inland rainforest patches have become successional habitat for moose (Alces alces), deer (Odocoileus) and elk (Cervus canadensis), leading to an increase in predatory species. Mountain caribou are protected by the high elevation during the winter months. During the summer months, when the snow retreats, caribou are highly vulnerable because moose and deer move to higher elevations. Moose and deer attract predators that also prey on the caribous.

== Conservation and environmental issues ==
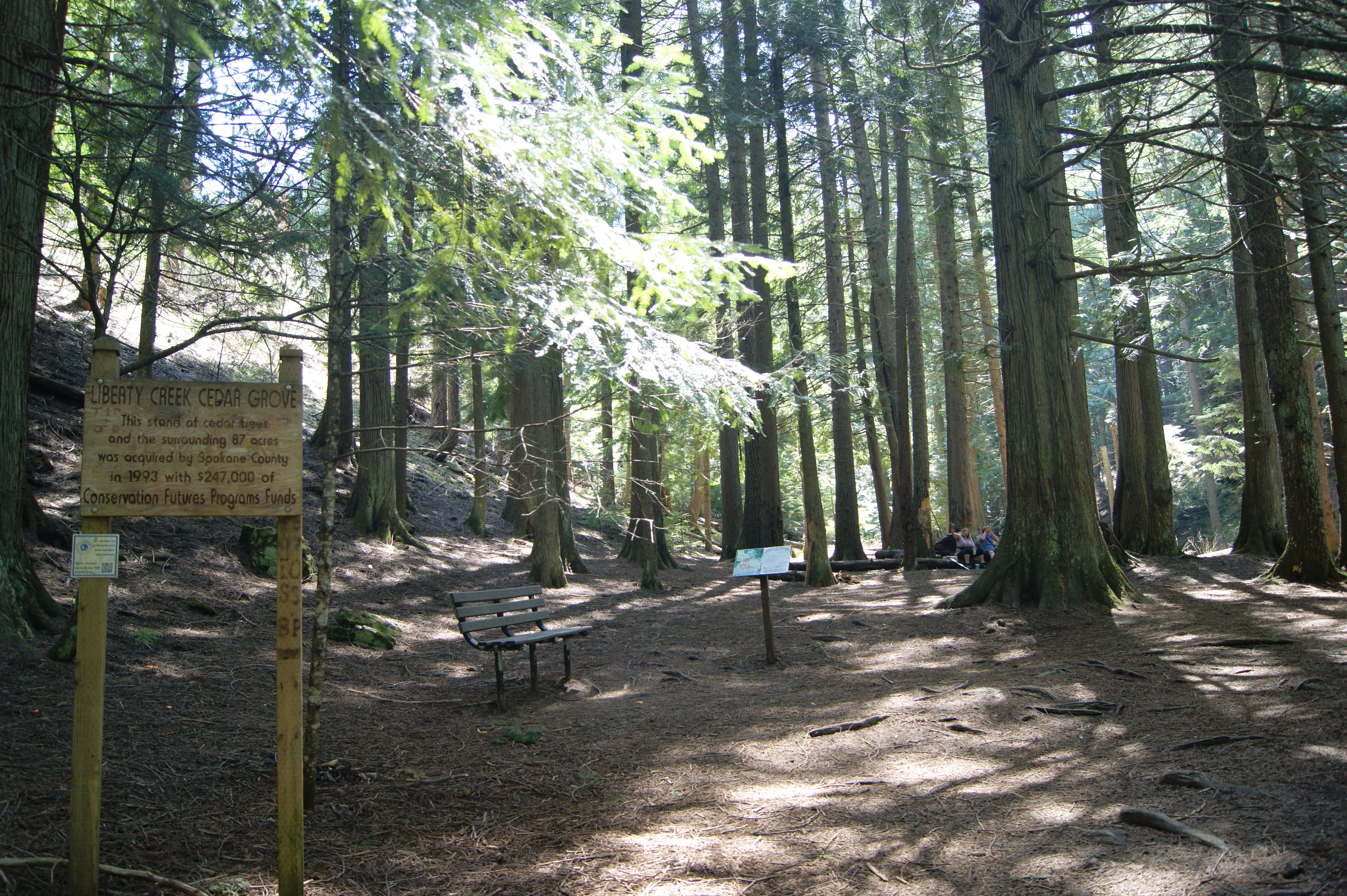
The Cedar Grove Conservation Area, The first property acquired though a county Conservation Futures program

=== Conservation ===
In British Columbian inland rainforests, there are 17.1% of forests, 5% of old forests and 4.5% of old, intact forests strictly protected. That means that the vast majority of the Canadian Inland rainforests are open to large-scale human impacts like clear-cut logging and other anthropogenic disturbances. Conservation projects in the United States are as of now not specifically tilted towards the protection of Inland rainforest patches. However, there are efforts to catalogue these areas by using conservation-area design (CAD) techniques.

=== Environmental issues ===
Currently, there are three major threats to the Inland rainforests: 1. logging, 2. mining and hydroelectric development projects and 3. climate change.

==== Logging ====
The Inland rainforest patches are highly at risk of being clear-cut. There is an extensive history of forestry in the region, however the rate of exploitation seems to be increasing. Forest ecologist Dominick DellaSala has compared the speed at which the Inland rainforest in British Columbia gets logged to logging in the tropical rainforest of Brazil.

==== Hydroelectric development ====
Particularly in British Columbia, large hydroelectric projects enormously threaten the functionality of the Inland rainforests and other riparian ecosystems. These projects are often highly controversial, and in the past have been permitted without adequate consideration for sensitive ecosystems and local communities.

==== Climate change ====
Climate change is likely to impact especially the amount of snow in winter and spring and the general annual temperature, which is believed to increase. Summer droughts and fires would be more probable, as well as a higher number of beetle outbreaks due to warmer winters that would allow more beetles to survive. Plant and animal species alike would be affected, for example, a drier climate would favor more drought-adapted species over the moisture-dependent plants in the Inland rainforest patches.

== Disturbance dynamics ==
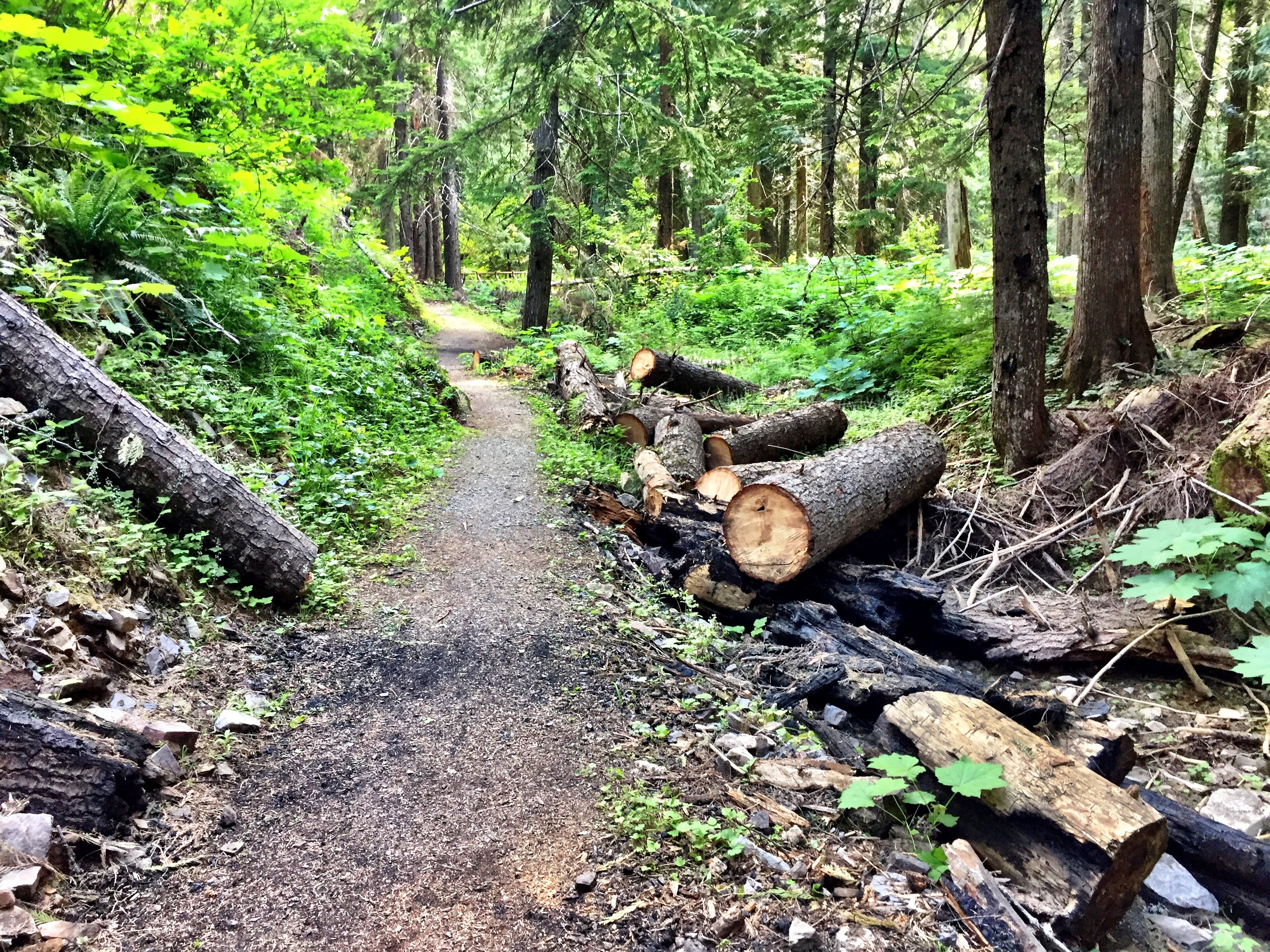
Charred trees in the Settlers Grove of Ancient Cedars, Idaho

The main large-scale disturbances in the northern Inland rainforest patches in British Columbia are infrequent periodic fires and insect outbreaks of the western hemlock looper (Lambdina fiscellaria lugubrosa). On a small scale, these forests are characterized by gap dynamics as results of senescence, heart rot and root rots. Avalanches, wind and snow loading can have varying effects from small-scale events like tree snapping to disturbances that affect large areas.

== See also ==
- Ancient Forest/Chun T'oh Whudujut Provincial Park
- Cascadia (bioregion)

== Bibliography ==
- Alaback, Paul; Krebs, Michael; Rosen, Paul (2000). “Ecological Characteristics and Natural Disturbances in Interior Rainforests of Northern Idaho.”, in: Robert G. D’Eon et alter (Ed.): Ecosystem Management of Forested Landscapes. Directions and Implementation: pp.27-37.
- Arsenault, André; Goward, Trevor (2000). “Ecological characteristics of inland rainforests. Ecoforestry. 15 (4): 20-23.
- Benson, Shelly; Coxson, Darwyn S. (2002). “Lichen Colonization and Gap Structure in Wet-temperate Rainforests of Northern Interior British Columbia”. The Bryologist. 105 (4): pp. 673-692.
- Cox, Sarah (2019). “Canada’s forgotten rainforest.” https://thenarwhal.ca/canadas-forgotten-rainforest/, accessed 11/06/2019.
- DellaSala, Dominick (2011). Temperate and Boreal Rainforests of the World. Ecology and Conservation.
- Drinkwater, Bob; Stevenson, Susan K. (2011). British Columbia's Inland Rainforest. Ecology, Conservation, and Management.
- Goward, Trevor; Spribille, Toby (2005). "Lichenological evidence for the recognition of inland rain forests in western North America". Journal of Biogeography. 32 (7): 1209-1219.
- Radies, David; Coxson, Darwyn; Johnson, Chris; Konwicki, Ksenia (2009). “Predicting canopy macrolichen diversity and abundance within old-growth inland temperate rainforests”. Forest Ecology and Management (2009): pp. 86-97.
- Stevenson, Susan K.; Jull, Michael J.; Rogers, Bruce J. (2006). “Abundance and attributes of wildlife trees and coarse woody debris at three silvicultural systems study areas in the Interior Cedar-Hemlock Zone, British Columbia”. Forest Ecology Management 233 (2006): pp. 176-191.
- U.S. Fish and Wildlife Service: Woodland Caribou (Rangifer tarandus caribou), https://ecos.fws.gov/ecp0/profile/speciesProfile?sId=4618, accessed 11/06/2019.
