= Whiskers Point Provincial Park =

Provincial Park in British Columbia

- IUCN category II (national park)
- Location within British Columbia
- Interactive map of Whiskers Point Provincial Park
- Location: British Columbia, Canada
- Nearest city: McLeod Lake
- Coordinates: 54°54′16″N 122°56′22″W
- Area: 116 ha (290 acres)
- Established: March 16, 1956
- Governing body: BC Parks

Whiskers Point Provincial Park is a provincial park in British Columbia, Canada and is located beside McLeod Lake approximately 20 km south of the community of McLeod Lake.

While primarily focused on recreational opportunities, Whiskers Point Provincial Park also provides significant conservation value as it is 1 of only 5 protected areas in McGregor Plateau ecosystem, all of which all small. Whiskers Point contributes 2.24% of the overall representation of this ecosection.

== Recreation ==
The park's location beside the lake allows access to swimming, windsurfing, waterskiing, boating and fishing. There is also lakeside hiking, picnicking, and camping.
