= Dezaiko Range =

Mountain range in British Columbia, Canada

- Location within British Columbia

Geography
- Location: British Columbia
- Range coordinates: 54°09′59″N 121°00′01″W
- Parent range: McGregor Plateau

The Dezaiko Range is a mountain range within the McGregor Plateau, a sub-plateau of the larger Nechako Plateau in British Columbia, Canada.

The Dezaiko Range is located northeast of the McGregor Range and extends 55+ km along the east side of McGregor River, from the Herrick Creek confluence to the McCullagh Creek confluence.

Close-To-The-Edge Provincial Park and Protected Area is located within the Dezaiko Range, home to the third deepest cave in Canada (472 m).

== Prominent peaks ==
- Mount Hedrick
- Mount McCullagh
- Gleason Peak
- Dezaiko Peak

== See also ==
- Close-To-The-Edge Provincial Park and Protected Area
