= Sutherland River =

River in British Columbia, Canada

Coordinates: 54°29′N 125°11′W

The Sutherland River, also once known as the Beaver River, is a river in the area of Babine Lake in northeastern British Columbia, Canada. The river, which flows northwest into the southeast end of Babine Lake, is named for Joachim Sutherland, a Part-First Nations man who had a homestead near the Nautley Indian Reserve Joachim (nicknamed Wassa) accompanied a British Columbia Land Survey Party in 1914.

Part of the river's basin forms the Sutherland River Provincial Park and Protected Area.

== See also ==
- List of rivers of British Columbia
