= Kluskoil Lake Provincial Park =

Provincial park in British Columbia, Canada

- IUCN category II (national park)
- Location within British Columbia
- Interactive map of Kluskoil Lake Provincial Park
- Location: British Columbia, Canada
- Nearest city: Quesnel
- Coordinates: 53°12′59″N 123°53′59″W
- Area: 155.48 km^{2} (60.03 sq mi)
- Established: July 13, 1995
- Governing body: BC Parks

Kluskoil Lake Provincial Park is a provincial park in British Columbia, Canada, located on the West Road River (Blackwater River) downstream from the Euchiniko Lakes.
