= Wistaria Provincial Park =

Provincial park in the Regional District of Bulkley-Nechako, British Columbia

- Location within British Columbia
- Interactive map of Wistaria Provincial Park
- Location: British Columbia, Canada
- Nearest city: Burns Lake
- Coordinates: 53°51′28″N 126°19′11″W
- Area: 40 ha (99 acres)
- Established: 1981
- Governing body: BC Parks

Wistaria Provincial Park is a provincial park in the Canadian province of British Columbia, located 60 km southwest of Burns Lake and approximately 80 km southeast of Houston, BC.

== Climate ==
Protected by the Coast Mountains and with a high plateau, the climate is subarctic continental (Köppen: Dfc) with long cold winters and warm summers, but spring can be very dry.

Climate data for Wistarial Provincial Park, elevation: 862.6 m or 2,830 ft, 1981-2010 normals, extremes 1926-2004
Month	Jan	Feb	Mar	Apr	May	Jun	Jul	Aug	Sep	Oct	Nov	Dec	Year
Record high °C (°F)	11.1 (52.0)	12.8 (55.0)	18.3 (64.9)	26.7 (80.1)	35.6 (96.1)	32.8 (91.0)	36.1 (97.0)	35.6 (96.1)	33.9 (93.0)	24.4 (75.9)	18.0 (64.4)	11.5 (52.7)	36.1 (97.0)
Mean daily maximum °C (°F)	−4.1 (24.6)	−1.4 (29.5)	3.3 (37.9)	8.5 (47.3)	13.2 (55.8)	17.2 (63.0)	19.6 (67.3)	19.8 (67.6)	15.6 (60.1)	8.3 (46.9)	1.0 (33.8)	−3.0 (26.6)	8.2 (46.7)
Daily mean °C (°F)	−7.9 (17.8)	−6.2 (20.8)	−2.1 (28.2)	2.7 (36.9)	7.2 (45.0)	11.2 (52.2)	13.5 (56.3)	13.4 (56.1)	9.5 (49.1)	4.0 (39.2)	−2.1 (28.2)	−6.3 (20.7)	3.1 (37.5)
Mean daily minimum °C (°F)	−11.6 (11.1)	−11.1 (12.0)	−7.6 (18.3)	−3.1 (26.4)	1.1 (34.0)	5.2 (41.4)	7.4 (45.3)	6.9 (44.4)	3.5 (38.3)	−0.4 (31.3)	−5.2 (22.6)	−9.5 (14.9)	−2.0 (28.3)
Record low °C (°F)	−43.9 (−47.0)	−40.6 (−41.1)	−36.1 (−33.0)	−25.6 (−14.1)	−9.4 (15.1)	−4.4 (24.1)	−2.8 (27.0)	−3.3 (26.1)	−19.4 (−2.9)	−23.5 (−10.3)	−35.5 (−31.9)	−41.7 (−43.1)	−43.9 (−47.0)
Average precipitation mm (inches)	38.5 (1.52)	25.5 (1.00)	20.5 (0.81)	16.7 (0.66)	32.3 (1.27)	54.0 (2.13)	42.3 (1.67)	38.0 (1.50)	41.4 (1.63)	40.3 (1.59)	43.7 (1.72)	39.5 (1.56)	432.7 (17.06)
Average rainfall mm (inches)	5.9 (0.23)	2.5 (0.10)	1.7 (0.07)	10.6 (0.42)	29.8 (1.17)	54.0 (2.13)	42.3 (1.67)	38.0 (1.50)	41.3 (1.63)	30.9 (1.22)	13.6 (0.54)	4.7 (0.19)	275.3 (10.87)
Average snowfall cm (inches)	32.5 (12.8)	23.0 (9.1)	18.8 (7.4)	6.1 (2.4)	2.5 (1.0)	0.0 (0.0)	0.0 (0.0)	0.0 (0.0)	0.1 (0.0)	9.4 (3.7)	30.2 (11.9)	34.8 (13.7)	157.4 (62)
Average precipitation days (≥ 0.2 mm)	11.1	8.5	7.6	5.9	9.5	11.7	10.6	10.1	9.9	11.1	12.3	10.0	118.3
Average rainy days (≥ 0.2 mm)	1.5	1.0	1.1	3.8	8.8	11.7	10.6	10.1	9.9	9.5	4.3	1.3	73.6
Average snowy days (≥ 0.2 cm)	10.2	7.6	6.8	2.5	1.1	0	0	0	0.05	2.8	9.0	9.2	49.25
Source: Environment Canada

== Recreation ==
The 40-hectare park provides boating and fishing access to Ootsa Lake. There is also a picnic area.
