= François Lake Provincial Park =

Provincial park in British Columbia, Canada

- IUCN category II (national park)
- Location within British Columbia
- Interactive map of François Lake Provincial Park
- Location: Range 4 Coast Land District, British Columbia, Canada
- Nearest city: Smithers, BC
- Coordinates: 53°57′59″N 125°10′39″W
- Area: 7,214 ha (17,830 acres)
- Established: June 28, 1999
- Governing body: BC Parks

François Lake Provincial Park is a provincial park in British Columbia, Canada, located at the east end of Francois Lake. The total park area is 7,214 hectares (17,830 acres). It is about 12 kilometres (7.5 mi) off BC Highway 16, southwest of the town of Fraser Lake. There is no potable water at the site so campers should bring their own.

== History ==
The Francois Lake Park was granted governmental protection in 1999. The decision was a result of the recommendations of the Vanderhoof Land and Resource Management Plan.

The Francois Lake Park protects a 25-kilometre stretch of shoreline. The predominant cover on this shoreline is conifers. The park is famous for its recreation facilities. These include boating and fishing on Francois Lake. There are also campsites with spectacular scenery. Picnickers can also avail of the picnic grounds.

== Cultural heritage ==
The Francois Lake is an area of abundant First Nations history. Ties to the history and to its ownership have been claimed by the Office of the Wet'suwet'en Hereditary Chiefs and the Carrier-Sekani Tribal Council. The park and its neighbouring Uncha Mountain Red Hills Park are associated with the historical and cultural lives of several bands, including Wet'suwet'en First Nation, Nadleh Whut’en Band, Stellat’en First Nation, Burns Lake Band, Nee Tahi Buhn Band, and Skin Tyee Band. The area is an ancient site where the First Nations people used to hunt, fish and gather.

== Flora and fauna ==
The park's large forest tracts are full of plant life. They also offer important habitat for moose in winter. Several mammals, like deer and black bear are found here. There are several species of birds. The lake supports a good population of sockeye salmon.

== Conservation ==
The Francois Lake Park lies within the Bulkley Basin Ecosection. The park contains some important habitat, which includes riparian zones. The park also supports numerous wildlife species. The lake's shore are covered with scarce stretches of low-elevation old-growth forest. This is due to an uncommon microclimate. Combined with the Uncha Mountain Red Hills Provincial Park to the west, the Francois Lake Park forms a 47 kilometres (29 mi) long corridor along its south shore. This is vital for maintaining connectivity between riparian and upland ecosystems.

== See also ==
- Uncha Mountain Red Hills Provincial Park
