= Torpy River =

Coordinates: 53°44′00″N 120°54′00″W

The Torpy River is a tributary of the Fraser River, rising in the Northern Rockies and the McGregor Range, a subdivision of the McGregor Plateau, and forming the boundary between the Rockies and the McGregor Plateau.

== See also ==
- List of rivers of British Columbia
