= McGregor Range =

Mountain range in British Columbia, Canada

- Location within British Columbia

Geography
- Country: Canada
- Province: British Columbia
- Range coordinates: 54°02′59″N 121°17′00″W
- Parent range: McGregor Plateau
- Topo map: NTS 93I3 Gleason Creek

The McGregor Range is a mountain range in the Central Interior of British Columbia, located between the main spine of the Rocky Mountains and the Fraser River on the northeast and southwest, and between the Torpy River on its southeast and the McGregor River on its northwest. Though adjacent to the Rockies and very mountainous, the McGregor Range is part of the McGregor Plateau, a subdivision of the Fraser Plateau.

Evanoff Provincial Park is located within the McGregor Range, and is home to the nationally significant Fang Cave Complex.

The northwest corner of the McGregor Range also includes the "Farm", a locally popular backcountry ski area in the vicinity of Mt. Charles.

== Prominent peaks ==
- Fang Mountain
- Mount Charles
- Longworth Peak
- Torpy Mountain
