= Heather-Dina Lakes Provincial Park =

Provincial park in British Columbia, Canada

- IUCN category II (national park)
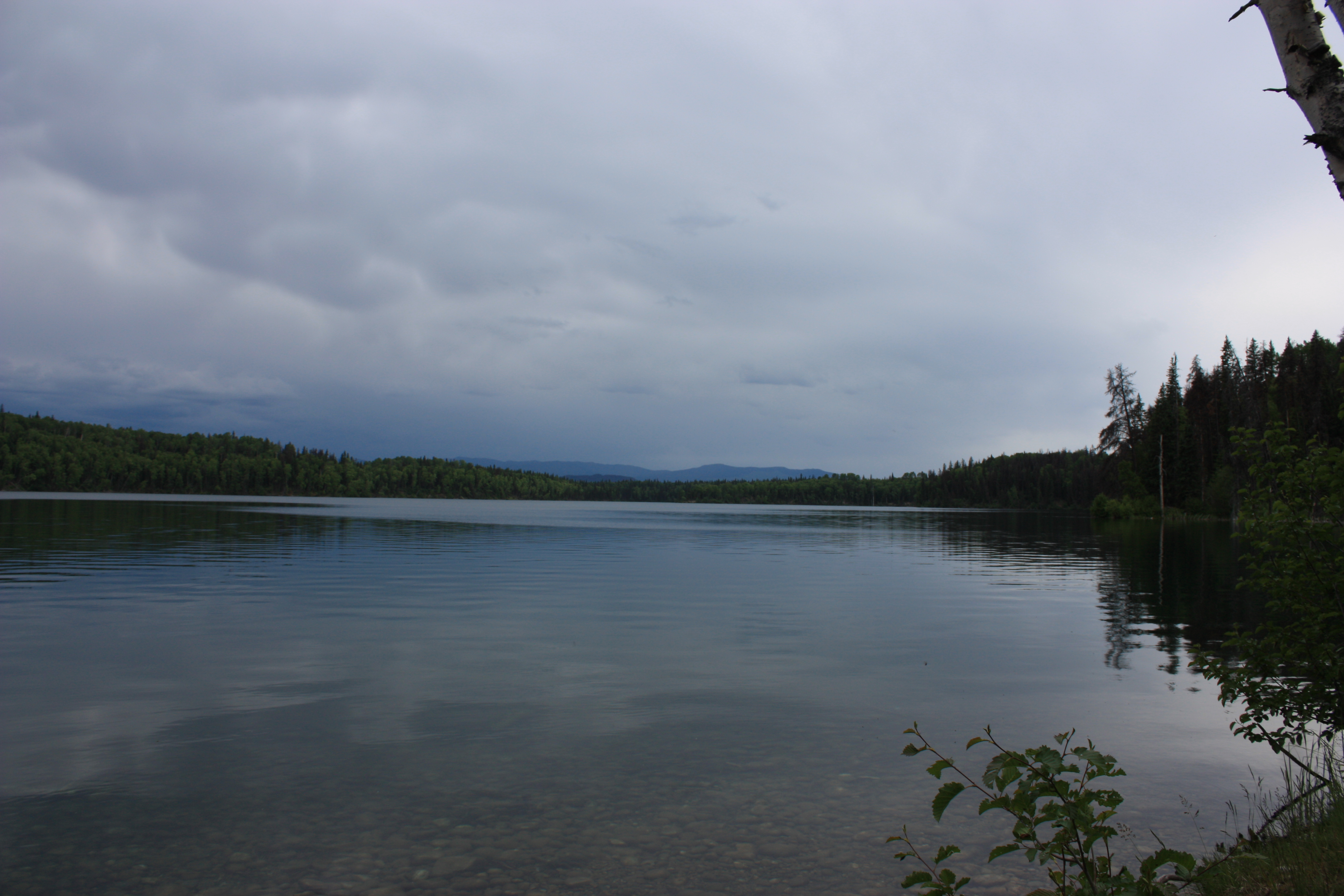
- Dina Lake

- Location within British Columbia
- Interactive map of Heather-Dina Lakes Provincial Park
- Location: Peace River Land District, British Columbia, Canada
- Nearest city: Mackenzie, British Columbia
- Coordinates: 55°30′37″N 123°17′46″W
- Area: 5,786 ha (14,300 acres)
- Established: April 11, 2001
- Governing body: BC Parks

Heather-Dina Lakes Provincial Park is a provincial park in British Columbia, Canada. Located along the eastern edge of Williston Lake, Heather-Dina Lakes Park, which is named after two lakes in the park, features mature, mixed forest with many small lakes. Facilities are quite limited compared to other parks in British Columbia. A primitive campground is located at Heather Lake and another at Dina Lake. Camping, fishing, canoeing, and hiking are popular activities among visitors.

Both lakes are stocked with fish and feature abundant wildlife, including abundant loons, ducks and other animals. The park size is reported to be 5,786 hectares.
