= Little Andrews Bay Marine Provincial Park =

Provincial park in Canada

- IUCN category II (national park)
- Location within British Columbia
- Interactive map of Little Andrews Bay Marine Provincial Park
- Location: British Columbia, Canada
- Nearest city: Smithers
- Coordinates: 53°47′44″N 126°38′29″W
- Area: 1.02 km^{2} (0.39 sq mi)
- Established: July 28, 1999
- Governing body: BC Parks

Little Andrews Bay Marine Provincial Park is a provincial park in British Columbia, Canada, located on Ootsa Lake in the Nechako Country in that province's Central Interior. It is 102 hectares (250 acres) in size.
