= Dahl Lake Provincial Park =

Provincial park in British Columbia, Canada

- IUCN category II (national park)
- Location within British Columbia
- Interactive map of Dahl Lake Provincial Park
- Location: Cariboo Land District, British Columbia, Canada
- Nearest city: Prince George, BC
- Coordinates: 53°46′29″N 123°17′45″W
- Area: 1,583 ha (3,910 acres)
- Established: October 22, 1981
- Governing body: BC Parks

Dahl Lake Provincial Park is a provincial park in British Columbia, Canada. It was established on October 22, 1981, and is currently 1,583 hectares (3,910 acres) in size.
