= Fraser River Provincial Park =

Provincial park in British Columbia, Canada

- IUCN category II (national park)
- Location within British Columbia
- Interactive map of Fraser River Provincial Park
- Location: Cariboo Land District, British Columbia, Canada
- Nearest city: Prince George, BC
- Coordinates: 53°28′59″N 122°43′14″W
- Area: 4,899 ha (12,110 acres)
- Established: June 29, 2000
- Governing body: BC Parks

Fraser River Provincial Park is a provincial park in British Columbia, Canada. It is 4,899 ha. in size and is located along the Fraser River.
