= Lac La Hache Provincial Park =

Provincial park in British Columbia, Canada

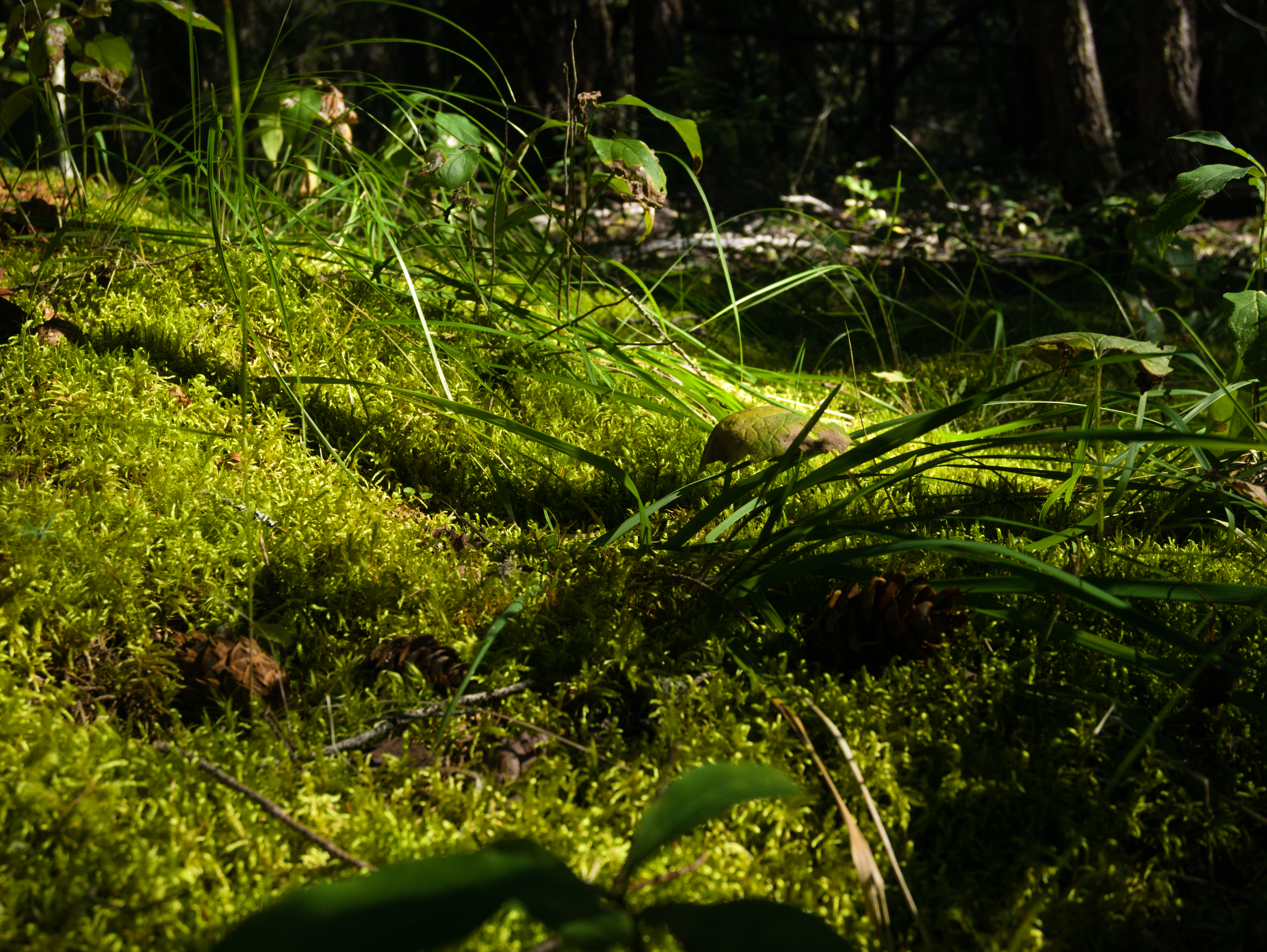
- Lichens and Grasses sparkle on the forest floor in Lac La Hache Provincial Park

- Location within British Columbia
- Interactive map of Lac La Hache Provincial Park
- Location: Canada
- Nearest city: Lac La Hache, British Columbia
- Coordinates: 51°51′34″N 121°38′17″W
- Area: 28 ha (69 acres)
- Established: 1956
- Operator: BC Parks
- Website: bcparks.ca/lac-la-hache-park/

Lac La Hache Provincial Park is a provincial park in British Columbia, Canada, located on lake and near community of the same name in the South Cariboo region of that province.

The park is in the Interior Douglas Fir Zone, and an old-growth stand of Douglas-fir trees surrounds the campground. Sunlight reaching the forest floor allows the growth of trembling aspen, lodgepole pine, pinegrass, bunchberry and prickly rose.
