= Tudyah Lake Provincial Park =

Provincial Park in British Columbia

- IUCN category II (national park)
- Location within British Columbia
- Interactive map of Tudyah Lake Provincial Park
- Location: British Columbia, Canada
- Nearest city: Mackenzie
- Coordinates: 55°03′50″N 123°02′10″W
- Area: 0.56 km^{2} (0.22 sq mi)
- Established: 1981
- Governing body: BC Parks

Tudyah Lake Provincial Park is a provincial park in British Columbia, Canada. The park is approximately 56 km south of Mackenzie, BC on Highway 97.

On the south shore of Tudyah Lake between the highway and the Pack River, Tudyah Lake Provincial Park offers lake and river oriented recreation activities, as well as a setting for camping and picnicking, all easily accessible to highway travellers and local residents. The rolling forest covered hills surrounding Tudyah Lake are characteristic of the Nechako Plateau natural landscape, and within the park, the shoreline and forested areas encourage nature appreciation. Use of the Pack River system as an early trading route adds historical interest and opportunities for interpretation in this park.

Topography within this park varies only slightly with elevations ranging from approximately 686 m to 672 m at the lake. Hydrologic features include Tudyah Lake on the north park boundary, the Pack River and an arm of backwater on the west boundary, and Bear Creek near the eastern boundary.

The park is on the former site of the Melville Lodge as well as a now-abandoned airstrip. This resort provided cabins, camping and boat launch facilities and was popular with Prince George and Mackenzie residents. In 1974, BC Hydro purchased this property in the reservoir basin because of the possible effect of the Williston Reservoir at maximum full pool flooding. Public demand for maintaining recreational opportunities of this area was so strong that BC Hydro contracted a caretaker to maintain the campground, picnic area and boat launch. During this time public pressure for park development at this site grew and following considerable negotiations, a Provincial Park was established in August, 1981.

Tudyah Lake supports a recreational fishery with rainbow trout and Dolly Varden as the popular sport species. Bear Creek has been noted as an important spawning area for trout.
