= Nation Lakes Provincial Park =

Provincial park in British Columbia, Canada

- IUCN category II (national park)
- Location within British Columbia
- Interactive map of Nation Lakes Provincial Park
- Location: British Columbia, Canada
- Nearest city: Fort St. James
- Coordinates: 55°27′29″N 125°24′00″W
- Area: 193.98 km^{2} (74.90 sq mi)
- Established: May 17, 2004
- Governing body: BC Parks

Nation Lakes Provincial Park is a provincial park in British Columbia, Canada.
