= Arctic Pacific Lakes Provincial Park =

Provincial park in British Columbia, Canada

- IUCN category II (national park)
- Location within British Columbia
- Interactive map of Arctic Pacific Lakes Provincial Park
- Location: Cariboo Land District, British Columbia, Canada
- Nearest city: Prince George, BC
- Coordinates: 54°23′04″N 121°33′20″W
- Area: 13,887 ha (34,320 acres)
- Established: 29 June 2000
- Governing body: BC Parks

Arctic Pacific Lakes Provincial Park is a provincial park in British Columbia, Canada, protecting a pair of lakes known as Arctic and Pacific Lakes, which as their name indicate are on the divide between the Pacific and Arctic drainages. Inherently, the Continental Divide runs between the two lakes, which lie in a narrow valley amid the rugged mountains of the northwesternmost McGregor Plateau. The pass formed by the lakes was important during early fur trade operations and was one of the main links between New Caledonia and the fur companies' eastern territories beyond the Rockies.

The park is located 90 kilometres northeast of Prince George, British Columbia and is 13,887 ha. in area.

== History and conservation ==
The park was established 29 June 2000.

The parks aims to protect fall and spring grizzly bear populations, and year-round caribou habitat, as well as fish populations including lake trout, bull trout, rainbow trout, kokanee, dolly varden, mountain whitefish, redside shiner, lake trout, chinook salmon, and Arctic grayling. The secondary role of the park is to protect the 1793 route of Alexander Mackenzie through the continental divide.
