= Donnely Lake Provincial Park =

Provincial park in British Columbia, Canada

Coordinates: 51°45′16″N 120°40′24″W

- Interactive map of Donnely Lake Provincial Park
- Location: Cariboo, British Columbia
- Area: 814 hectares (2,010 acres)
- Established: 2013
- Governing body: BC Parks

Donnely Lake Provincial Park is a BC Parks and former recreation site located in the Cariboo Regional District of British Columbia. The park was established in 2013. The park entirely surround Donnely Lake, directly north of Deka Lake. A single trail from the former recreation site of the same name leads between Bowers Lake Forest Service Road and the lake, providing access for camping and fishing.
