= Close to the Edge (cave) =

Cave in British Columbia, Canada

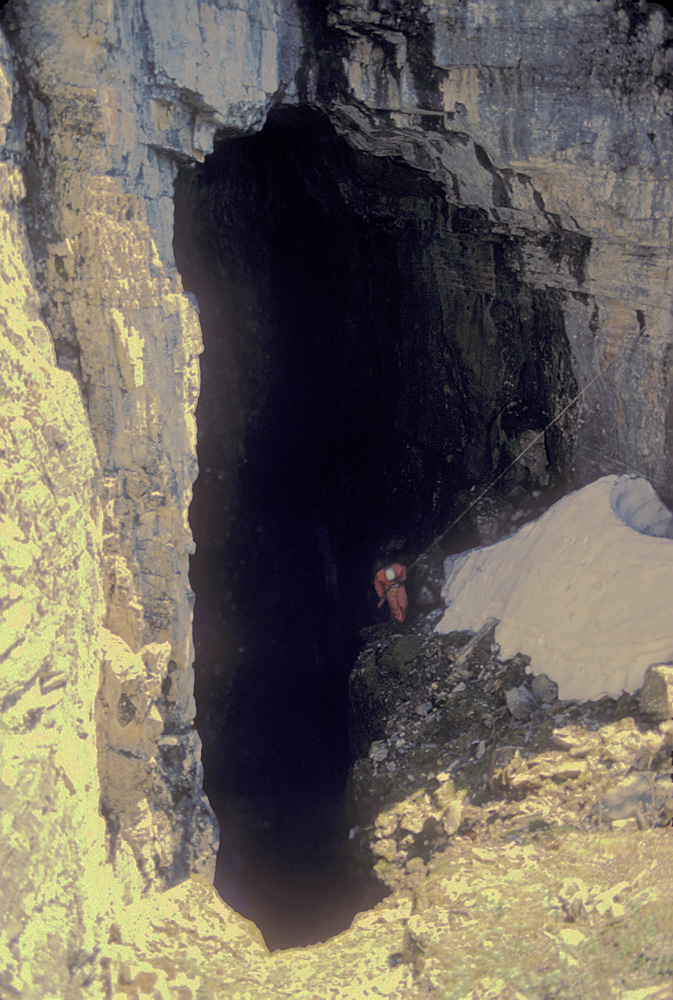
- Entrance to CTTE, 1986
- Location: Close To The Edge Provincial Park, British Columbia, Canada
- Depth: 472 metres (1,549 ft)
- Length: 1,153 metres (3,783 ft)
- Discovery: 1985
- Entrances: 1
- Difficulty: Highly technical
- Hazards: Ice, rockfall
- Access: long and steep

Close to the Edge is a significant cave in the Dezaiko Range of the Rocky Mountains in British Columbia, Canada. It is within Close To The Edge Provincial Park and Protected Area about 160 km east of Prince George, British Columbia.

== Name origin ==
The cave is named for its remarkable cliffside location; a caver standing on the entrance rampart can look down the 255-metre entrance shaft on one side and down some 700 metres to the valley floor on the other. This topographic oddity is also reminiscent of the artwork on the 1972 record album Close to the Edge by the band Yes, which featured lakes improbably perched on mountain summits. Local cavers also felt "close to the edge" of their abilities while exploring the unprecedented deep shaft.

== Cave setting and form ==
The 20m wide entrance to Close to the Edge is located in a cliff near the summit of an unnamed mountain, but is hidden by a natural rampart and thus only visible from the air. The entrance shaft is 255 m deep, by far the deepest in Canada, and often sports a 20-metre-long overhanging icicle. This is followed by shafts of 32 m, 17 m, 7 m, 10 m, 10 m, 8 m, 9 m, 68 m, and 9 m, ending at a sump. As of 2023, the surveyed length of all passages only totals 1153 metres, while its overall depth of 472 metres makes it the fifth-deepest cave in Canada. It is believed that the sump water reappears at Twin Falls Resurgence some 600 m below the entrance.

== Exploration ==
The first recorded entrance sighting was in 1985 by cavers in a helicopter supporting a nearby expedition. The following year the cave was explored to a frozen mud and stone blockage at the base of the second pitch at a depth of about 320 meters. The blockage was removed in 1994 by a team led by Neeld Messler, Jim Hewett and Stephen Alvarez. A final exploration in 2001 by a team led by Canadians John Donovan, Jason Morgan, Dan Pach and Australian Warwick M Green (Formally known as Warwick Baggs) pushed the cave from the blockage and discovered the sump at -472 m. This team surveyed and mapped the cave and published their findings with the assistance of Dr Chas Yonge of the University of Calgary. Subsequent explorations have not resulted in further depth.

== See also ==
- List of caves in Canada
