= Bobtail Mountain Provincial Park =

Provincial park in British Columbia, Canada

- IUCN category II (national park)
- Location within British Columbia
- Interactive map of Bobtail Mountain Provincial Park
- Location: Cariboo Land District, British Columbia, Canada
- Nearest city: Prince George, BC
- Coordinates: 53°41′14″N 123°21′53″W
- Area: 1,360 ha (3,400 acres)
- Established: June 29, 2000; 26 years ago
- Governing body: BC Parks

Bobtail Mountain Provincial Park is a provincial park in British Columbia, Canada. It was established on June 29, 2000, under the Protected Areas of British Columbia Act.
