= Three Sisters Lakes Provincial Park =

Provincial park in British Columbia, Canada

- IUCN category II (national park)
- Location within British Columbia
- Interactive map of Three Sisters Lakes Provincial Park
- Location: British Columbia, Canada
- Nearest city: Quesnel
- Coordinates: 53°32′05″N 122°31′51″W
- Area: 9.68 km^{2} (3.74 sq mi)
- Established: June 29, 2000
- Governing body: BC Parks

Three Sisters Lake Provincial Park is a provincial park in British Columbia, Canada, located 35 km southeast of Prince George and northeast of the community of Hixon. In addition the three lakes which are the parks namesake the park protects a unique canyon feature on Government Creek.

The officially gazetted name of the park is "Three Sisters Lakes Park", although the BC Parks website uses "Three Sisters Lake Park" (the singular form).
