= Nuntsi Provincial Park =

Provincial park in British Columbia, Canada

- IUCN category II (national park)
- Location within British Columbia
- Interactive map of Nuntsi Provincial Park
- Location: British Columbia, Canada
- Nearest city: Alexis Creek
- Coordinates: 51°44′34″N 123°47′05″W
- Area: 207.5 km^{2} (80.1 sq mi)
- Established: July 13, 1995
- Governing body: BC Parks

Nuntsi Provincial Park, also known as Taseko Provincial Park, is a provincial park in British Columbia, Canada, located on the west side of the Taseko River in that province's Chilcotin District, flanking both sides of Nuntsi Creek.
