= Erg Mountain Provincial Park =

Provincial park in British Columbia, Canada

- IUCN category II (national park)
- Location within British Columbia
- Interactive map of Erg Mountain Provincial Park
- Location: Cariboo Land District, British Columbia, Canada
- Nearest city: Crescent Spur, BC
- Coordinates: 53°34′13″N 120°54′29″W
- Area: 1,011 ha (2,500 acres)
- Established: June 29, 2000
- Governing body: BC Parks

Erg Mountain Provincial Park is a provincial park in British Columbia, Canada.

The park is spread over an area of 1,011 hectares. In its interior parts, starting from the slopes of the valley above the Upper Fraser Trench, the park consists of cedar hemlock forests. From these forests, the park continues on to higher altitudes, reaching the sub-alpine and alpine areas near the Erg Mountain. This mountain, which is an old hiking destination, is known for the magnificent vistas it offers of the Upper Fraser Valley along with the mountain range in the vicinity. When the weather is clear, the prominent Mount Sir Alexander is visible.
