= Ruth Lake Provincial Park =

Provincial park in British Columbia

- IUCN category II (national park)
- Location within British Columbia
- Interactive map of Ruth Lake Provincial Park
- Location: British Columbia, Canada
- Nearest city: 100 Mile House
- Coordinates: 51°49′39″N 121°01′55″W
- Area: 0.3 km^{2} (0.12 sq mi)
- Established: August 21, 1959
- Governing body: BC Parks

Ruth Lake Provincial Park is a provincial park in British Columbia, Canada, located northeast of 100 Mile House.
