= Call Lake Provincial Park =

Provincial park in British Columbia, Canada

- IUCN category II (national park)
- Location within British Columbia
- Interactive map of Call Lake Provincial Park
- Location: Range 5 Coast Land District, British Columbia, Canada
- Nearest city: Smithers, BC
- Coordinates: 54°45′47″N 127°05′27″W
- Area: 60 ha (150 acres)
- Established: June 28, 1999
- Governing body: BC Parks

Call Lake Provincial Park is a provincial park in British Columbia, Canada, 5 kilometres (3.1 mi) southeast of Smithers, British Columbia, in the Bulkley Valley region. The park was established in 1999, comprising approximately 60 hectares.
