= Rubyrock Lake Provincial Park =

Provincial park in the Regional District of Bulkley-Nechako, British Columbia

- IUCN category II (national park)
- Location within British Columbia
- Interactive map of Rubyrock Lake Provincial Park
- Location: British Columbia, Canada
- Nearest city: Fort St. James
- Coordinates: 54°41′09″N 125°20′44″W
- Area: 412.21 km^{2} (159.16 sq mi)
- Established: January 25, 2001
- Governing body: BC Parks

Rubyrock Lake Provincial Park is a provincial park in British Columbia, Canada.
