= Netalzul Meadows Provincial Park =

Provincial park in British Columbia, Canada

- IUCN category II (national park)
- Location within British Columbia
- Interactive map of Netalzul Meadows Provincial Park
- Location: British Columbia, Canada
- Nearest city: Hazelton
- Coordinates: 55°14′19″N 127°01′49″W
- Area: 2.92 km^{2} (1.13 sq mi)
- Established: June 28, 1999
- Governing body: BC Parks

Netalzul Meadows Provincial Park is a provincial park in British Columbia, Canada. It is located in the Harold-Price watershed, about 50 km north of Smithers. The park consists of an unusual wet meadow complex, as well as a spectacular waterfall and rare plant species.
