= Ptarmigan Creek Provincial Park and Protected Area =

Provincial park in British Columbia, Canada

Ptarmigan Creek Provincial Park
- IUCN category II (national park)
- Location within British Columbia
- Interactive map of Ptarmigan Creek Provincial Park
- Location: British Columbia, Canada
- Nearest city: Prince George
- Coordinates: 53°29′33″N 120°53′22″W
- Area: 33.29 km^{2} (12.85 sq mi)
- Established: June 29, 2000
- Governing body: BC Parks

Ptarmigan Creek Provincial Park and Protected Area is a provincial park in British Columbia, Canada.
