= Uncha Mountain Red Hills Provincial Park =

Provincial park in British Columbia, Canada

- IUCN category II (national park)
- Location within British Columbia
- Interactive map of Uncha Mountain Red Hills Provincial Park
- Location: British Columbia, Canada
- Nearest city: Burns Lake
- Coordinates: 53°58′26″N 125°32′05″W
- Area: 94.21 km^{2} (36.37 sq mi)
- Established: January 25, 2001
- Governing body: BC Parks

Uncha Mountain Red Hills Provincial Park is a provincial park in British Columbia, Canada, comprising two parcels of land on the north and south shores of Francois Lake. Total area of the park is 9,421 hectares.

== Climate ==
Climate data for Tayksie Lake, BC (1981-2010): 884m
Month	Jan	Feb	Mar	Apr	May	Jun	Jul	Aug	Sep	Oct	Nov	Dec	Year
Record high °C (°F)	12.0 (53.6)	11.5 (52.7)	18.0 (64.4)	23.5 (74.3)	27.0 (80.6)	30.0 (86.0)	32.0 (89.6)	32.5 (90.5)	31.0 (87.8)	25.5 (77.9)	13.5 (56.3)	10.0 (50.0)	32.5 (90.5)
Mean daily maximum °C (°F)	−4.4 (24.1)	−0.9 (30.4)	3.2 (37.8)	9.2 (48.6)	13.8 (56.8)	17.3 (63.1)	19.4 (66.9)	19.8 (67.6)	15.7 (60.3)	8.2 (46.8)	0.8 (33.4)	−2.9 (26.8)	8.3 (46.9)
Daily mean °C (°F)	−9.1 (15.6)	−6.6 (20.1)	−3.0 (26.6)	2.4 (36.3)	6.4 (43.5)	10.2 (50.4)	12.2 (54.0)	12.3 (54.1)	8.7 (47.7)	2.7 (36.9)	−3.4 (25.9)	−7.2 (19.0)	2.1 (35.8)
Mean daily minimum °C (°F)	−13.9 (7.0)	−12.2 (10.0)	−9.1 (15.6)	−4.5 (23.9)	−1.1 (30.0)	3.1 (37.6)	4.9 (40.8)	4.8 (40.6)	1.6 (34.9)	−3.0 (26.6)	−7.6 (18.3)	−11.5 (11.3)	−4.0 (24.7)
Record low °C (°F)	−44.0 (−47.2)	−38.5 (−37.3)	−31.5 (−24.7)	−21.5 (−6.7)	−14.0 (6.8)	−7.0 (19.4)	−6.0 (21.2)	−8.0 (17.6)	−10.0 (14.0)	−25.5 (−13.9)	−35.0 (−31.0)	−45.0 (−49.0)	−45.0 (−49.0)
Average precipitation mm (inches)	48.4 (1.91)	30.4 (1.20)	34.9 (1.37)	22.7 (0.89)	41.6 (1.64)	60.9 (2.40)	57.9 (2.28)	45.6 (1.80)	45.0 (1.77)	56.8 (2.24)	58.7 (2.31)	56.1 (2.21)	559 (22.02)
Average snowfall cm (inches)	41.5 (16.3)	26.9 (10.6)	29.7 (11.7)	7.3 (2.9)	2.8 (1.1)	0.0 (0.0)	0.0 (0.0)	0.0 (0.0)	0.2 (0.1)	15.3 (6.0)	42.8 (16.9)	50.5 (19.9)	217 (85.5)
Source: Environment Canada

== See also ==
- Francois Lake Provincial Park
