= Mudzenchoot Provincial Park =

Provincial park in British Columbia

- IUCN category II (national park)
- Location within British Columbia
- Interactive map of Mudzenchoot Provincial Park
- Location: British Columbia, Canada
- Nearest city: Fort St. James
- Coordinates: 55°02′19″N 124°26′29″W
- Area: 6.44 km^{2} (2.49 sq mi)
- Established: January 25, 2001
- Governing body: BC Parks

Mudzenchoot Provincial Park is a provincial park in British Columbia, Canada, located 90 km (56 mi) northwest of Fort St. James in the Omineca Country of British Columbia's Central Interior. It is at a high elevation and is characterized by dry meadows including unique vegetation such as erigerons, aster type species, and cotton grass. The provincial park has zero facilities or road access points.

== Mudzenchoot Lake ==
Mudzenchoot lake is located on the northwest corner of the park. It has a surface area of 0.4 sq mi (1.1 km^{2}) Nearby lakes include Witch Lake, Inzana Lake, and Trembleur Lake.

The average depth of the lake is 16 ft (4.9 m), and the deepest point is 44.3 ft (13.5 m) as of June 11, 1977.
