= Jackman Flats Provincial Park =

Provincial park in British Columbia, Canada

- IUCN category II (national park)
- Location within British Columbia
- Interactive map of Jackman Flats Provincial Park
- Location: Cariboo Land District, British Columbia, Canada
- Nearest city: Tête Jaune Cache
- Coordinates: 52°56′09″N 119°23′10″W
- Area: 615 ha (1,520 acres)
- Established: June 29, 1971
- Governing body: BC Parks
- Website: bcparks.ca/jackman-flats-park/

Jackman Flats Provincial Park is a provincial park in British Columbia, Canada, comprising approximately 615 ha. and just southeast of Tête Jaune Cache in the Rocky Mountain Trench, near the Yellowhead Pass. The park features several hiking trails.
