= Babine Mountains Provincial Park =

Provincial park in British Columbia

- IUCN category II (national park)
- Location within British Columbia
- Interactive map of Babine Mountains Provincial Park
- Location: Range 5 Coast Land District, British Columbia, Canada
- Nearest city: Smithers, BC
- Coordinates: 54°55′34″N 126°54′52″W
- Area: 31,465 ha (77,750 acres)
- Established: April 4, 1984
- Governing body: BC Parks

Babine Mountains Provincial Park is a provincial park in British Columbia, Canada, located to the east of the Bulkley River between the town of Smithers (to the southwest) and Babine Lake (to the northeast). Established by Order-in-Council as the Babine Mountains Recreation Area in 1984, it was upgraded to park status and its name changed in 1999. It contains approximately 31,465 hectares (77,750 acres).

The park is home to black bears, ground squirrels, moose, marmot, and several species of birds. On occasion, grizzly bears, lynx, and wolverines have been sighted as well.
