= Sutherland River Provincial Park and Protected Area =

Provincial park in British Columbia, Canada

Sutherland River Provincial Park
- IUCN category II (national park)
- Location within British Columbia
- Interactive map of Sutherland River Provincial Park
- Location: British Columbia, Canada
- Nearest city: Fort St. James
- Coordinates: 54°28′07″N 125°05′21″W
- Area: 135.59 km^{2} (52.35 sq mi)
- Established: April 11, 2001
- Governing body: BC Parks

Sutherland River Provincial Park and Protected Area is a provincial park in British Columbia, Canada.

Sutherland River Park and Protected Area is located at the east end of Babine Lake. It makes up a portion of the Sutherland River Drainage. In 2000, Sutherland River Park was designated a class A Park following the recommendation of the Lakes Land and Resource Management Plan. In 1999 it was designated a protected area by the Vanderhoof Land and Resource Management Plan.

The Sutherland River is a spawning site for sockeye and steelhead fish, as well as being a habitat for moose, grizzly bears, and wolves.

The park offers fishing, canoeing and kayaking, hiking, camping and hunting.
