= Slim Creek Provincial Park =

Canadian provincial park

- IUCN category II (national park)
- Location within British Columbia
- Interactive map of Slim Creek Provincial Park
- Location: British Columbia, Canada
- Nearest city: Prince George
- Coordinates: 53°45′55″N 121°11′16″W
- Area: 5.06 km^{2} (1.95 sq mi)
- Established: June 29, 2000
- Governing body: BC Parks

Slim Creek Provincial Park is a provincial park in British Columbia, Canada.
