= Rainbow Alley Provincial Park =

Provincial park in the Regional District of Bulkley-Nechako, British Columbia

- IUCN category II (national park)
- Location within British Columbia
- Interactive map of Rainbow Alley Provincial Park
- Location: British Columbia, Canada
- Nearest city: Fort Babine
- Coordinates: 55°20′06″N 126°38′27″W
- Area: 1.1 km^{2} (0.42 sq mi)
- Established: June 28, 1999
- Governing body: BC Parks

Rainbow Alley Provincial Park is a provincial park in British Columbia, Canada.
