= Purden Lake Provincial Park =

Canadian provincial park

- IUCN category II (national park)
- Location within British Columbia
- Interactive map of Purden Lake Provincial Park
- Location: Fraser-Fort George, British Columbia, Canada
- Nearest city: Prince George
- Coordinates: 53°55′45″N 121°54′41″W
- Area: 2,521 ha (9.73 sq mi)
- Established: August 21, 1971
- Governing body: BC Parks

Purden Lake Provincial Park is a provincial park in British Columbia, Canada. It is located east of Prince George. It encompasses the north and east sides of Purden Lake. It was established in August 1971 and covers 2,521 hectares. In 2018, Purden became the first accessible park in British Columbia, adding wheelchair ramps and specialist playground equipment.

A report by BC Parks stated that 45,449 people visited the park in the 2016/17 season, and 52,547 visited it in the 2017/18 season.
