= White Pelican Provincial Park =

Provincial park in British Columbia, Canada

- IUCN category III (natural monument or feature)
- Location within British Columbia
- Interactive map of White Pelican Provincial Park
- Location: British Columbia, Canada
- Nearest city: Alexis Creek
- Coordinates: 52°16′43″N 123°1′54″W
- Area: 2,763 ha (6,830 acres)
- Established: April 8, 1971
- Governing body: BC Parks

White Pelican Provincial Park is a provincial park in British Columbia, Canada. The park is located 31 kilometres (19 mi) northeast of Alexis Creek, and 60 kilometres (37 mi) northwest of Williams Lake. The park surrounds Stum Lake, which hosts the only nesting colony of the American white pelican in the province. The park is closed annually from March 1 to August 31. Boating, hiking, discharging firearms, trapping and other recreational activities are restricted during this period.

American white pelicans are endangered in British Columbia, and are very sensitive to disturbance. Widespread nesting failures and abandonment have been caused numerous times by both human and natural disturbances. Current threats to the population include expansion of logging roads near the park boundary, and increasing numbers of humans attempting to view the pelicans.
