= Nilkitkwa Lake Provincial Park =

Provincial park in British Columbia

Nilkitwa Lake Provincial Park
- IUCN category II (national park)
- Location within British Columbia
- Interactive map of Nilkitwa Lake Provincial Park
- Location: British Columbia, Canada
- Nearest city: Smithers
- Coordinates: 55°24′00″N 126°39′43″W
- Area: 0.1 km^{2} (0.039 sq mi)
- Established: June 28, 1999
- Governing body: BC Parks

Nilkitkwa Lake Provincial Park is a provincial park in British Columbia, Canada.
