= McGregor Plateau =

- Plateau
- Location within British Columbia
- Coordinates: 54°19′59″N 121°00′04″W
- Location: British Columbia, Canada
- Part of: Nechako Plateau

The McGregor Plateau is a sub-plateau of the Nechako Plateau, the northernmost major subdivision of the Interior Plateau spanning the inland regions of the Pacific Northwest. Located in British Columbia, Canada, to the east of the city of Prince George, British Columbia, the McGregor Plateau lies between the main spine of the Northern Rocky Mountains on the east and the Fraser River on the west, beginning on its southeast at the confluence of the Torpy River with the Fraser and running northwest, parallel to the Fraser and the Rockies, to end in the area of the Arctic and Pacific Lakes to the north of the great bend in the Fraser River just upstream from and to the northeast of Prince George. The McGregor Plateau is very mountainous in character and includes several large rivers, the largest being the McGregor River and Herrick Creek. Included in the McGregor Plateau is the McGregor Range, which lies between the McGregor and Torpy Rivers and the Dezaiko Range, which lies between Herrick and McGregor Rivers.

The plateau's name commemorates Captain James Herrick McGregor PLS, who died at the Second Battle of Ypres during World War I on April 25, 1915, in service with the 16th Battalion Canadian Highland Brigade.
