= Close To The Edge Provincial Park and Protected Area =

Protected area in British Columbia, Canada

- IUCN category III (natural monument or feature)
- Location within British Columbia
- Interactive map of Close To The Edge Provincial Park and Protected Area
- Location: Fraser-Fort George, British Columbia, Canada
- Nearest city: Prince George
- Coordinates: 54°03′25″N 121°01′00″W
- Area: 702 ha (1,730 acres)
- Established: January 25, 2001
- Governing body: BC Parks

Close To The Edge Provincial Park and Protected Area is a provincial park and a protected area in British Columbia, Canada.

== History and conservation ==
The Park was established June 29, 2000 to protect Close To The Edge, a significant cave feature: the deepest shaft (255 m) and the third-deepest cave (472 m) in Canada. The cave was discovered in 1985, but its bottom was not reached until 2001.

The adjacent Protected Area was established on January 25, 2001, to protect the less significant caves Bluebell Resurgence Cave and Twin Falls Resurgence, and is a lower level of protection which allows future logging road access to the headwaters of Hedrick Creek.

Both the Park and the Protected Area also protect habitat for caribou, moose, black and grizzly bears.

== Geography ==
Close To The Edge Provincial Park and Protected Area is located within the Dezaiko Range of the McGregor Plateau approximately 160 kilometers northeast of Prince George, British Columbia. It is 702 hectares in size (414 ha Provincial Park and 288 ha Protected Area).

== Facilities ==
There are no park facilities. Access is on logging roads, followed by unmaintained horse/foot trails.

== See also ==
- The Stone Corral (Monkman Provincial Park)
