= Ethel F. Wilson Memorial Provincial Park =

Provincial park in British Columbia, Canada

- IUCN category II (national park)
- Location within British Columbia
- Interactive map of Ethel F. Wilson Memorial Provincial Park
- Location: Range 5 Coast Land District, British Columbia, Canada
- Nearest city: Houston, BC
- Coordinates: 54°25′03″N 125°41′13″W
- Area: 33 ha (82 acres)
- Established: May 2, 1953
- Governing body: BC Parks

Ethel F. Wilson Memorial Provincial Park is a provincial park in central British Columbia, Canada. The park is situated on the northern tip of Pinkut Lake. Activities in the park include rainbow trout fishing and boating. The park has five campsites that are allocated on a first-come first-served basis. The area of the park is 33 hectares.
