= Babine (disambiguation) =

The Babine are an indigenous group in New Brunswick, Canada.

Babine may also refer to:

- Babine, British Columbia, Canada
- Babine Lake, lake in British Columbia
- Babine (alcoholic drink)
- Babine (film)

== See also ==
- Babine-Witsuwitʼen language
