= Topley =

Topley may refer to:

Surname:

- Don Topley (born 1964), former English cricketer
- Lady Sophia Topley (born 1957), daughter of the 11th Duke of Devonshire
- Martina Topley-Bird (born 1975), British vocalist
- Peter Topley (born 1950), former English cricketer
- Reece Topley (born 1994), English cricketer
- William James Topley (1845–1930), Canadian photographer based in Ottawa, Ontario
- William Topley (geologist) FRS (1841–1894), British geologist
- William Topley (musician), British musician
- William Whiteman Carlton Topley FRS (1886–1944), British bacteriologist

Places:

- Topley, British Columbia, small town in northern British Columbia, located on the Trans-Canada highway
- Topley Landing Provincial Park, provincial park in British Columbia, Canada
- Topley Landing, British Columbia, small town near the provincial park
