= Range 5 Coast Land District =

Land district in British Columbia, Canada

Coordinates: 54°30′N 127°30′W

Range 5 Coast Land District is one of the 59 land districts of British Columbia, Canada, which are part of the cadastral divisions of British Columbia.

== Islands ==
- Digby Island
- Kaien Island
- Kitson Island
- Lelu Island

== Lakes ==
- Barrett Lake
- Stuart Lake

== Settlements ==
- Amsbury
- Broman Lake
- Burns Lake
- Braeside
- Clemretta
- Colleymount
- Decker Lake
- Dorreen
- Driftwood Creek
- Engen
- Frantois Lake
- Fraser Lake
- Fort Fraser
- Gingolx
- Glentanna
- Grand Rapids
- Granisle
- Lake Kathlyn
- Lakelse Lake
- Lax Kw'alaams
- Lucas
- Metlakatla
- Middle River
- Nechako
- Oona River
- Perow
- Phelan
- Pinchi Lake
- Pitman
- Port Edward
- Prairiedale
- Prince Rupert
- Remo
- Rose Lake
- Sheraton
- Smithers
- Telkwa
- Terrace
- Thornhill
- Topley Landing
- Usk
- Wet'suwet'en Village
- Wiley
- Yekooche
