= Cunningham Lake =

- Location within British Columbia
- Location: Omineca; British Columbia, Canada
- Coordinates: 54°35′15″N 125°19′18″W
- Type: reservoir
- Primary outflows: Nancut Creek
- Basin countries: Canada
- Surface area: 78 km^{2} (30 mi^{2})
- Average depth: 3.6 m (12 ft)
- Residence time: 76.9 days
- Shore length^{1}: 12.1 km (7.5 mi)
- Surface elevation: 1,100 m (3,600 ft)
- ^{1} Shore length is not a well-defined measure.

Cunningham Lake (Dakelh lang. Yeko Bun) is in the Omineca region of central British Columbia. By road and trail, the eastern end is about 80 kilometres (50 mi) northwest of Fort St. James. Nancut Creek flows northeast from the lake into Stuart Lake.

== Name origin ==
The Hudson's Bay Company (HBC) journals record the name as Yokogh, Jokoh, Petit Lac or Little Lake. A.G. Morice's 1907 map adopted the latter. Maps since 1912 have used Cunningham Lake. The oldest Dakelh name is Tadulh of unknown meaning. The more recent name of Yeko may come from 'ukoh meaning creek. One theory is that Yeko refers to the western part of the lake and Yekoozdli to the eastern part.

== Lake profile ==
The shore length is 12.1 kilometres (7.5 mi). The surface area is 78 square kilometres (30 mi^{2}) and elevation is 1,100 metres (3,600 ft) above sea level. The mean depth is 3.6 metres (12 ft).

Important locations are Yekoozdli (former village), Tadulh (the narrows, where cache pits and possibly pit houses are located), Noo Tsui and Noo Tsula islands, and Scooby Island (a.k.a. Ts 'oo Noo).

== Permanent village ==
The Yekooche First Nation (a.k.a. the Portage Band) have inhabited the Stuart Lake area for thousands of years. Around 1800, Father Morice described the population near the lake as a few small bands of fishermen subsisting mostly on whitefish. By the early 1800s, the tribe lived at the Yekoozdli village site on the creek at the east end of the lake.

The North West Company (NWC) network never extended beyond Fort St. James. Unless buyers came from the fort in the winter to trade, the First Nations around Babine Lake largely traded furs directly with the Yekooche, who in turn traded with that fort. To secure this trading network, the Stuart Lake Dakelh acted as middlemen by bringing goods from the fort to the various Babine Lake locations, and were blocking other tribes from passing between Babine Lake and Stuart Lake by 1820. This business opportunity ceased with the establishment of the HBC Fort Babine in 1822.

The Yekoozdli village in 1824 comprised 6 couples, 2 widows, 3 young men, and 8 infants. After the NWC merger in 1821, the HBC operated Fort St. James. The HBC fishery founded at Beaver Creek produced inconsistent returns. However, an abundance of fish at Yekoozdli prompted the HBC to create a second fishery at that lake in 1827. A fishing weir was installed on the creek beside the village.

A large burial ground was established at Yekoozdli by the late 1800s.

== Seasonal presence ==
Around the 1880s, most of the people moved to Yekooche (a.k.a. Portage), which lies at the eastern end of the Babine Portage. Villages historically located close to primary resources. In this instance, colonization changed settlement behaviour. The value of being on an important trade route took precedence over proximity to fish as a food source.

The former settlement became primarily a fishing, hunting, and trapping area. From the early 1900s to the 1940s, numerous families from throughout the watershed came to Cunningham Lake for whitefish. In 1908, a fish hatchery was built on the creek, which provided a new source of income for some of the villagers. On closing in 1930, the families moved to Yekooche. However, many have continued to maintain cabins and smokehouses at the lake. Ucausley 16 is the present reserve.

As well as a source of hay for cows and horses, the area provides lake trout, whitefish, kokanee, moose, bear, deer, duck, and beaver to hunters. Such food is dried or canned for winter.

On a small island called Ruby Rock, the Joseph brothers have a hunting/fishing guide outfitting company. On a little peninsula, known as Yekoosle, a Yekooche family owns cabins. The Joseph brothers own small cabins on the small reservation nearby, which they use for haying and hunting. At night, guests can hear loons calling in the distance, and wolves and coyotes howling.

== Maps ==
- "Standard Oil BC map". www.davidrumsey.com. 1937.
- "Shell BC map". www.davidrumsey.com. 1956.

== See also ==
- List of lakes of British Columbia
