= Port Edward =

Port Edward may refer to:

- Port Edward, British Columbia, a district municipality in Canada
- Port Edward, KwaZulu-Natal, a town in South Africa
- Port Edward, China, the former name of the urban core of Weihai, Shandong, China

== See also ==
- Port Edwards, Wisconsin
