= Babine Portage, British Columbia =

Babine Portage
- Location of Babine Portage in British Columbia
- Coordinates: 54°31′00″N 125°11′00″W
- Country: Canada
- Province: British Columbia
- Region: Skeena/Omineca
- Regional district: Kitimat–Stikine
- Time zone: UTC-8 (PST)
  - Summer (DST): UTC-7 (PDT)

Babine Portage borders the Skeena and Omineca regions of central British Columbia. The portage linked Babine Lake and Stuart Lake, and lies between the Yekooche First Nation reserves of Nan tl' at 13 and Ye koo che 13. By road, the location is about 80 kilometres (50 mi) northwest of Fort St. James.

== First Nations ==
The Yekooche First Nation (a.k.a. the Portage Band) have inhabited the Stuart Lake area for thousands of years. The band originally settled in Yekoozdli at the east end of Cunningham Lake. Around the 1880s, the band moved from Yekoozdli to Yekooche (a.k.a. Portage), which lies at the eastern end of the Babine Portage.

== Main traffic route ==
On the establishment of Fort Babine in 1822, the Hudson's Bay Company (HBC) needed a link to the existing Fort St. James. The respective legs were Babine Lake (140 kilometres (90 mi)), Babine Portage (14 kilometres (9 mi)), and Stuart Lake (64 kilometres (40 mi)).

The initial portage trail was cut with great difficulty through dense forest over a one-week period in October 1822. Cargo was carried and canoes dragged westward from Stuart Lake to Yekoozdli and then on to Babine Lake. To avoid hilly sections, the new trail deviated in places from the rudimentary First Nations ones. The objective was to make transportation easier for the planned pack trains.

Southeastward freight comprised furs for sale overseas and salmon for Fort St. James. The fort at Fraser Lake also supplied salmon, because fish stocks were frequently scarce in Stuart Lake.

Northwestward freight comprised trading items and general supplies for Fort Babine.

In the early 1840s, the route was upgraded to a wagon road and horsedrawn carts replaced packhorses on the portage, which reduced freight costs.

== Branch traffic route ==
In the early 1870s, freight for Fort Babine began coming via the Skeena River to The Forks, followed by a 64-kilometre (40 mi) portage. From 1879, Fort St. James freight also largely came via the Skeena.

Expanding trade increased the Fort St. James traffic. To handle the greater volumes, warehouses were built in 1887 at both ends of the Babine Portage to house freight.

In the early 1890s, the Skeena route became almost exclusive.

In the early 1900s, the HBC was known to operate two pairs of horses and wagons on the Babine Portage throughout the summer. The wagon road over the divide was about 91 metres (300 ft) above Babine Lake and 110 metres (350 ft) above Stuart Lake. About 3 kilometres (2 mi) from the latter, the road crossed the creek. At this point canoes were launched to travel downstream.

== Lake transportation ==
During the 1820s, the canoes carrying freight were probably of birch bark construction. By the early 1830s, dugout canoes were in use. During winter, freight could be carried in sleighs across frozen lakes.

In the early 1840s, boats replaced the canoes. A decade later, a boat with a four-person crew took three to five days to complete the lake portions between the two forts. Water transportation remained the preferred mode for local shipping throughout the district.

In 1892, two cutters were built to reduce the shipping costs of freight on the two lakes.

In the early 1900s, the Stuart and the Babine were built to ply the respective lakes, which significantly reduced freight costs by 1907. The former was overhauled that year and replaced with a new Stuart in 1908. The Babine was repaired in 1908. A successful trip to Fort St. James by the steamer Nechacco in 1909 suggested that the previous Quesnel route could again be viable.

== Demise ==
The fur trade continued into the 1900s, before slowly declining. However, the completion of the Grand Trunk Pacific Railway (GTP) in 1914 replaced water transportation with rail. Many of the traditional HBC routes fell into disuse. The Babine Portage's importance to the fur trade ended The railway bypassed the area, creating a relative isolation for the inhabitants, which proved fortunate, because the people escaped the devastation of the 1918 Spanish flu epidemic.

== Maps ==
- "Standard Oil BC map". www.davidrumsey.com. 1937.
- "Shell BC map". www.davidrumsey.com. 1956.
