= Topley Landing =

- Location of Topley Landing Topley Landing (Canada)
- Coordinates: 54°48′44″N 126°8′59″W
- Country: Canada
- Province: British Columbia
- Time zone: UTC−07:00 (Pacific Time)
- Area codes: 250, 778

Topley Landing is an unincorporated community at the outlet of the Fulton River on the western shore of Babine Lake in northwest British Columbia, Canada.

Topley Landing is located just off Highway 118. It is within the Pacific Time Zone and observes daylight saving time. The largest local settlement is Smithers, about 65 km (40 mi) west of Topley Landing. Topley lies about 40 km (25 mi) to the south.

== Description ==
The community has 83 homes, with a few full-time residents, most of the homes being seasonal dwellings for the large influx of tourists visiting in the summer months. The sockeye salmon fishery, which opens for six weeks from the beginning of August, attracts many campers and boaters to the area.

The Nat'oot'en Nation, a First Nations band government, has a community called Tachek (or Tachet) nearby.

== History ==
Topley Landing dates back to 1822, when it was established by the Hudson's Bay Company for local natives to trade furs for other goods, and named after an early settler, William J. Topley. Catholic missionaries took up residence in 1848 and a small church was built. A post office opened in 1921, followed by a one-room school, which was stocked with five hundred books by the retired Topley who was living in Alberta.

The church was used until 1988, when much of the population moved to nearby Granisle, where two copper mines had opened, and the church became disused. Then between 1993 and 1995 the old church building was relocated and restored, a pump organ was installed, and the church was opened to visitors in the warmer months and used for weddings, memorials and special occasions.

== Climate ==
Climate data for Topley Landing, BC (1981-2010): 722m
Month	Jan	Feb	Mar	Apr	May	Jun	Jul	Aug	Sep	Oct	Nov	Dec	Year
Record high °C (°F)	10.0 (50.0)	12.8 (55.0)	16.0 (60.8)	24.5 (76.1)	33.0 (91.4)	32.8 (91.0)	34.4 (93.9)	33.5 (92.3)	31.0 (87.8)	24.5 (76.1)	17.8 (64.0)	11.0 (51.8)	34.4 (93.9)
Mean daily maximum °C (°F)	−5.0 (23.0)	−1.5 (29.3)	3.7 (38.7)	9.4 (48.9)	14.6 (58.3)	18.5 (65.3)	20.7 (69.3)	20.4 (68.7)	15.4 (59.7)	8.1 (46.6)	0.3 (32.5)	−3.9 (25.0)	8.4 (47.1)
Daily mean °C (°F)	−8.5 (16.7)	−6.0 (21.2)	−1.6 (29.1)	3.6 (38.5)	8.4 (47.1)	12.4 (54.3)	14.6 (58.3)	14.1 (57.4)	9.7 (49.5)	4.0 (39.2)	−2.6 (27.3)	−6.9 (19.6)	3.4 (38.1)
Mean daily minimum °C (°F)	−12.0 (10.4)	−10.4 (13.3)	−6.9 (19.6)	−2.3 (27.9)	2.2 (36.0)	6.3 (43.3)	8.4 (47.1)	7.7 (45.9)	4.1 (39.4)	−0.2 (31.6)	−5.4 (22.3)	−9.8 (14.4)	−1.5 (29.3)
Record low °C (°F)	−41.7 (−43.1)	−36.5 (−33.7)	−35.0 (−31.0)	−20.6 (−5.1)	−10.0 (14.0)	−1.7 (28.9)	0.0 (32.0)	−1.0 (30.2)	−4.5 (23.9)	−20.5 (−4.9)	−34.0 (−29.2)	−41.0 (−41.8)	−41.7 (−43.1)
Average precipitation mm (inches)	54.4 (2.14)	34.5 (1.36)	29.6 (1.17)	25.0 (0.98)	42.2 (1.66)	58.5 (2.30)	46.4 (1.83)	42.1 (1.66)	43.1 (1.70)	54.4 (2.14)	57.0 (2.24)	51.1 (2.01)	538.1 (21.19)
Average rainfall mm (inches)	4.9 (0.19)	3.6 (0.14)	4.7 (0.19)	16.8 (0.66)	40.6 (1.60)	58.5 (2.30)	46.4 (1.83)	42.1 (1.66)	43.1 (1.70)	42.8 (1.69)	14.6 (0.57)	3.8 (0.15)	322.0 (12.68)
Average snowfall cm (inches)	49.5 (19.5)	30.8 (12.1)	24.8 (9.8)	8.2 (3.2)	1.6 (0.6)	0.0 (0.0)	0.0 (0.0)	0.0 (0.0)	0.0 (0.0)	11.5 (4.5)	42.4 (16.7)	47.3 (18.6)	216.1 (85.1)
Average precipitation days (≥ 0.2 mm)	15.4	11.0	9.7	9.6	13.4	14.8	13.9	12.5	12.8	15.0	16.0	14.6	158.7
Average rainy days (≥ 0.2 mm)	2.2	1.6	3.3	7.6	13.0	14.8	13.9	12.5	12.8	13.6	5.7	1.8	102.8
Average snowy days (≥ 0.2 cm)	13.9	10.1	7.3	3.0	0.6	0.0	0.0	0.0	0.0	2.7	12.0	13.4	63.0
Mean monthly sunshine hours	45.2	90.7	156.9	201.9	237.4	232.0	260.0	243.5	173.0	100.0	42.0	28.4	1,811
Percentage possible sunshine	18.5	33.2	42.8	47.8	47.6	44.9	50.2	52.6	45.2	30.6	16.5	12.5	36.9
Source: Environment Canada

== Topley Landing Provincial Park ==
Topley Landing Provincial Park, was established in 1964 along the western shore of the Lake.
