= Red Bluff Provincial Park =

Provincial park in British Columbia, Canada

- IUCN category II (national park)
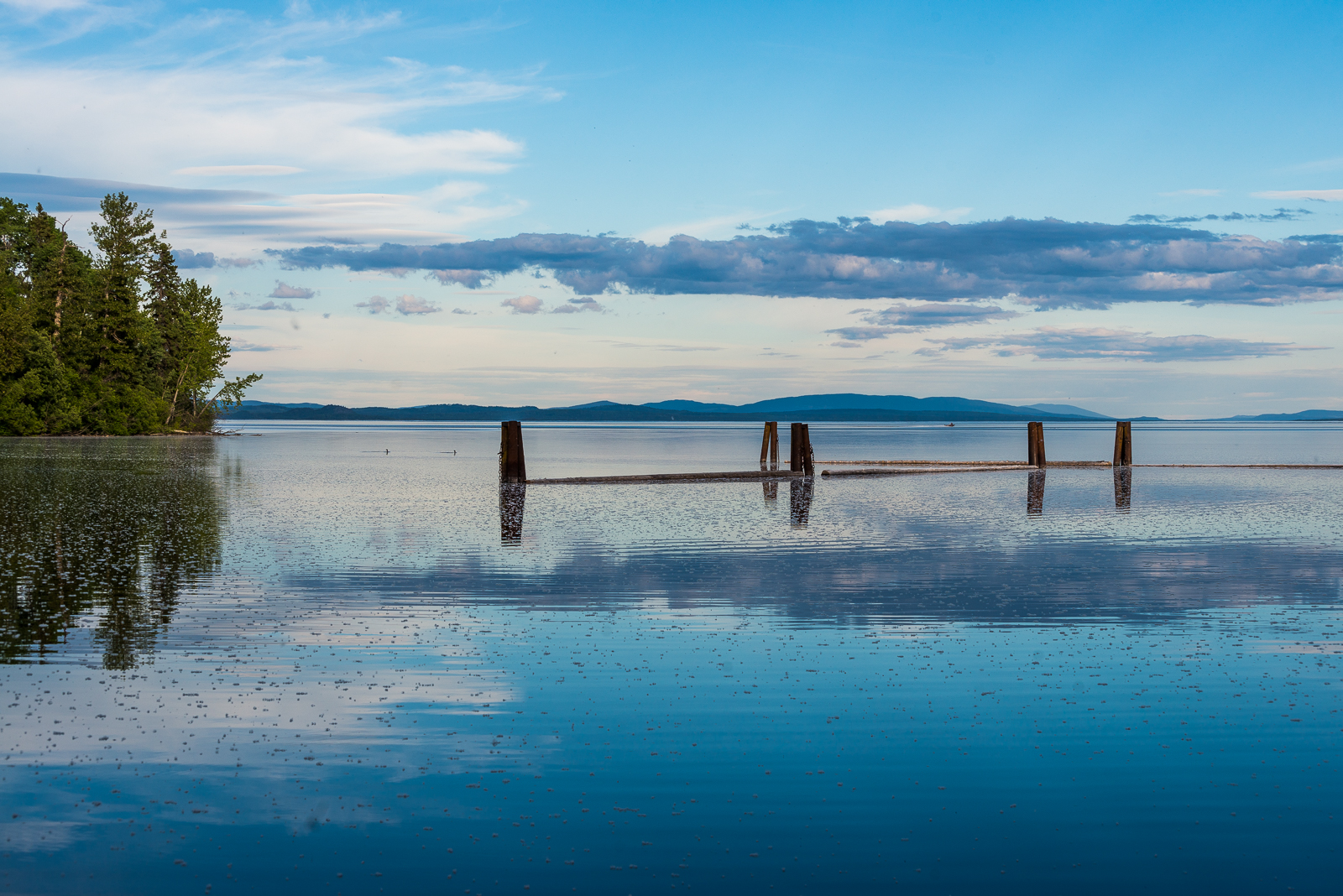
- Panoramic view

- Location within British Columbia
- Interactive map of Red Bluff Provincial Park
- Location: British Columbia, Canada
- Nearest city: Granisle
- Coordinates: 54°51′15″N 126°10′51″W
- Area: 1.48 km^{2} (0.57 sq mi)
- Established: August 24, 1978
- Governing body: BC Parks

Red Bluff Provincial Park is a provincial park in British Columbia, Canada.
