= Kitson Island Marine Provincial Park =

Provincial park in British Columbia, Canada

- IUCN category II (national park)
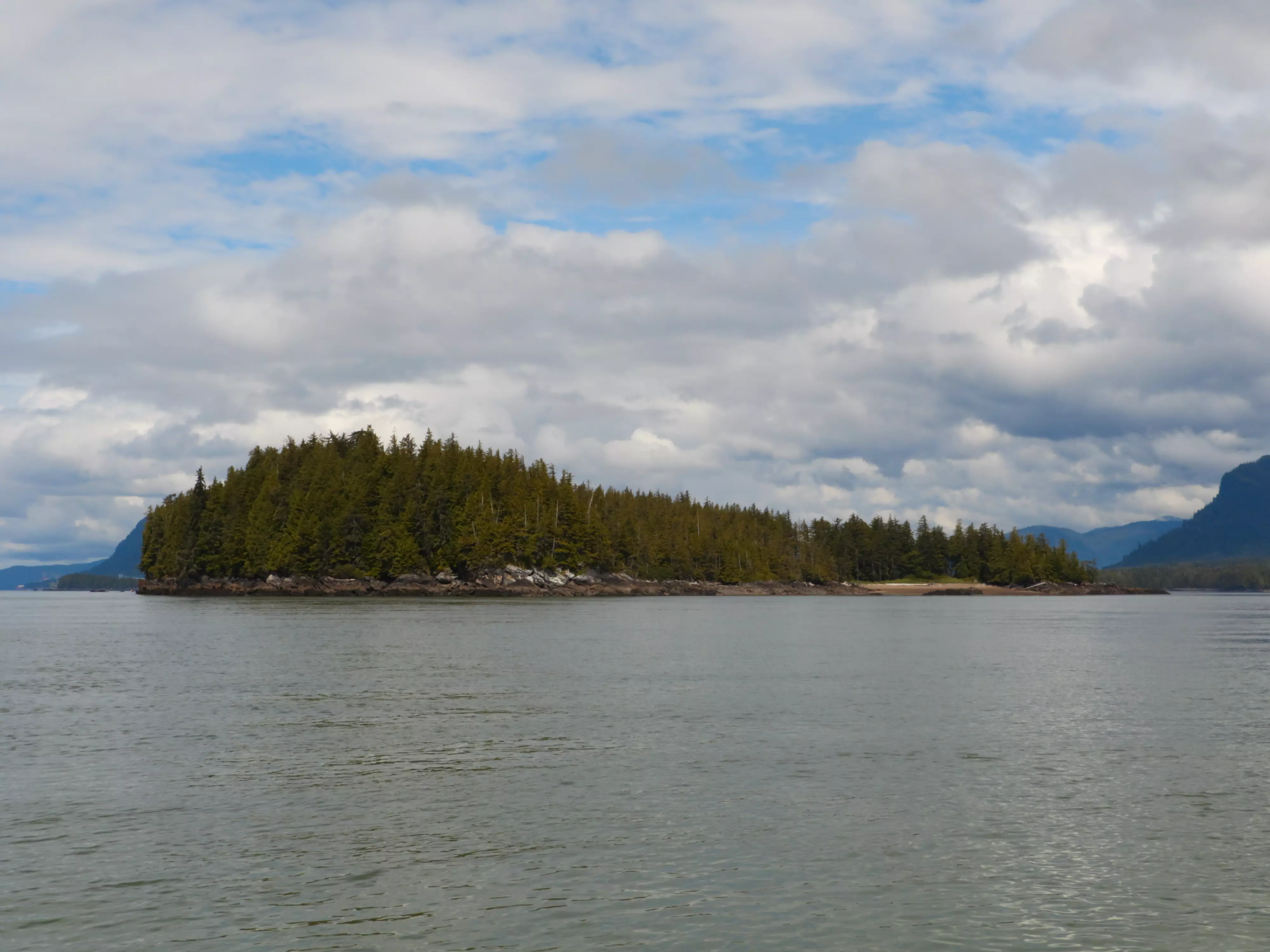
- Kitson Island Marine Park as seen from the southwest

- Location within British Columbia
- Interactive map of Kitson Island Marine Provincial Park
- Location: Canada
- Coordinates: 54°10′45″N 130°19′01″W
- Area: 45 ha (110 acres)
- Established: 14 June 1993
- Operator: BC Parks

Kitson Island Marine Provincial Park is a provincial park protecting all 45 hectares (110 acres) of Kitson Island and Kitson Islet. The park is located within the asserted traditional territory of the Tsimshian and Metlakatla First Nation, at the mouth of the Skeena River in British Columbia, Canada.

This park is one of a number of marine parks along the Inside Passage, protecting significant wildlife species and their habitats and the portion of Flora Bank within the park. It also features one of only a few easily accessible sandy beaches in the North Coast area.
