= Guy Lovell =

English cricketer (born 1969)

Personal information
- Full name: William Guy Lovell
- Born: 16 February 1969 (age 57); Whitehaven, Cumberland, England
- Batting: Right-handed
- Bowling: Slow left-arm orthodox

Domestic team information
- Years: Team
- 1991: Essex
- 1993: Cumberland
- 1998: Lancashire Cricket Board

Career statistics
Competition	List A
Matches	1
Runs scored	0
Batting average	–
100s/50s	–/–
Top score	–
Balls bowled	36
Wickets	0
Bowling average	–
5 wickets in innings	–
10 wickets in match	–
Best bowling	–
Catches/stumpings	–/–
- Source: Cricinfo, 2 January 2019

William Guy Lovell (born 16 February 1969) is a former English cricketer.

Born at Whitehaven, Lovell made a single appearance in List A cricket for Essex against Lancashire at Old Trafford in the 1991 Refuge Assurance League. He wasn't called upon to bat during the match, but did bowl six wicketless overs. Two years later he played minor counties cricket for Cumberland, making two appearances in the Minor Counties Championship. He later played one match for the Lancashire Cricket Board in the 1998 Minor Counties Knockout Trophy.

After his brief playing career, Lovell became a plumber in Lancashire. Alongside Don Topley, he later alleged that the match he played in between Lancashire and Essex was fixed.
