= Lake Babine Nation =

Babine band government in British Columbia, Canada

- Band No. 607
- People: Babine
- Headquarters: Burns Lake
- Province: British Columbia

Land
- Main reserve: Woyenne 27
- Reserves: List: Alphonse Tommy 7; Augier Lake 22; Babine 6, 16, 25, 26; Babine Lake 20, 21B; Babine River 21A; Casdeded 8; Chanoodandidalch 14; Chapel Park 28; Clotalairquot 4; Michell Pierre 12; Ne-Tsaw-Greece 10; Nedoats 11, 13; No-Cut 5; Pinkut Lake 23; Tadinlay 15; Tahlo Lake 24; Tsak 9
- Land area: 30.94 km^{2} (11.95 sq mi)

Population (2025)
- On reserve: 969
- On other land: 45
- Off reserve: 1545
- Total population: 2559

Government
- Chief: Wilfred Adam
- Council: 2024-2027: Bessie West (Deputy Chief); Jason Charlie; Melvin Joseph; Fabian Michell; Debbie West; Delores Alec; Mildred George; Lyle Michell; Erin Alec

Website
- lakebabine.com

Lake Babine Nation (also known as Nataotin or Nat'oot'en Nation) is a Babine band government, historically located on the banks of Babine Lake in central British Columbia, Canada. Since the 1940s, many members of the Nation have relocated to its main community in Woyenne, near Burns Lake. Other year-round communities include Tachet, located on the central part of Babine Lake, and Wit'at (Fort Babine), situated at the northwest arm of the lake. Seasonal communities include Nedo'ats (Old Fort) at the northern end of the lake and Donald's Landing (Pinkut Nation) near the southern end.

The nation consists of roughly 2,500 members, living both on and off the nation's 27 reserve lands. Its traditional language is Babine-Witsuwit'en, a Northern Athabaskan language. Lake Babine Nation was officially established in December 1957 through legislation by the Department of Indian and Northern Affairs Canada, which amalgamated the Fort Babine and Old Fort Bands. It is currently at Stage 4 of the British Columbia Treaty Negotiation Process. The nation also signed a reconciliation agreement called the Foundation Agreement with the Province of British Columbia and the Government of Canada in September 2020.

Woyenne, the Nation's largest community with around 940 residents, is located adjacent to Burns Lake, British Columbia. The community features its own preschool, kindergarten, daycare, and adult learning center, as well as the Nation's main band office.

Wit'at, home to approximately 150 permanent residents, has an elementary school, a health clinic, a water treatment plant, and a satellite band office. Since the amalgamation of the Fort Babine and Old Fort Bands in the 1950s, a separation movement has emerged in Wit'at, with some residents identifying as members of the "Wit'at Nation" rather than Lake Babine Nation.

Tachet also has approximately 130 permanent residents, along with a satellite band office, a water treatment plant, and a convenience store.

== Clans ==
The Lake Babine Nation has traditionally comprised four clans:

- Jilh tsekh xu (Frog)
- Likh tsa mis xu (Beaver)
- Gilanton (Cariboo)
- Likh c’ bu (Bear)
