= Babine =

Nadot'en
Regions with significant populations
- British Columbia, Canada

Languages
- English, Babine-Witsuwitʼen

Religion
- Christianity, Animism

Related ethnic groups
- Other Dene; Especially Tsilhqotʼin, Dakelh, and Wetʼsuwetʼen

In its broader sense, Babine (sometimes spelled Babeen in older English-language texts) refers to the First Nations peoples who speak the Babine dialect of the Babine-Witsuwitʼen language, part of the Athabaskan language family, in the vicinity of the Babine River, Babine Lake, Trembleur Lake, and Takla Lake in the central interior of British Columbia, Canada.

In its narrower sense, Babine refers to the subset of Babine speakers who belong to the Lake Babine Nation, a band comprising three main communities:

- Fort Babine (traditional name: Wit'at, approx. 100 full-time residents);
- Tachet (approx. 100 full-time residents);
- and Woyenne (next to the village of Burns Lake, approx. 800 residents).

The term Babine is of French origin, meaning "lippy", because when first encountered by fur traders. Babine women wore labrets. Although perceived by some as disparaging, the band prefers to use the name "Lake Babine Nation" because it emphasizes the connection of the people to their traditional territory around Babine Lake. Other ethnonyms associated with the Babine in historical literature incorrectly include Chemesyan or Chimpseyan, which is an archaic term used for all Tsimshianic speaking peoples, usually the Tsimshian.

The Babine is located in the Skeena River watershed.
