= Pakistani cricket team in England in 2024 =

International cricket tour

	England	Pakistan
- Dates: 22 May – 30 May 2024
Captains	Jos Buttler	Babar Azam

Twenty20 International series
- Results: England won the 4-match series 2–0
Most runs	Jos Buttler (123)	Babar Azam (68)
Most wickets	Moeen Ali (3); Jofra Archer (3); Liam Livingstone (3); Adil Rashid (3); Reece Topley (3)	Haris Rauf (5)
- Player of the series: Jos Buttler (Eng)

The Pakistan cricket team toured England in May 2024 to play four Twenty20 International (T20I) matches. The series formed part of both teams' preparation ahead of the 2024 ICC Men's T20 World Cup. In July 2023, the England Cricket Board (ECB) confirmed the fixtures.

The first match was abandoned because of heavy rain in Leeds. England won the second match in Birmingham by 23 runs and that game saw Jofra Archer play his first international fixture in over a year due to injuries. The third match, in Cardiff, was another washout. England won the fourth match in London by 7 wickets and won the series 2–0.

== Squads ==
England	Pakistan
Jos Buttler (c, wk); Moeen Ali (vc); Jofra Archer; Jonny Bairstow (wk); Harry Brook; Sam Curran; Ben Duckett; Tom Hartley; Will Jacks; Chris Jordan; Liam Livingstone; Adil Rashid; Phil Salt (wk); Reece Topley; Mark Wood	Babar Azam (c); Abbas Afridi; Abrar Ahmed; Iftikhar Ahmed; Hasan Ali; Mohammad Amir; Shaheen Afridi; Saim Ayub; Salman Ali Agha; Azam Khan (wk); Irfan Khan; Shadab Khan; Usman Khan; Haris Rauf; Mohammad Rizwan (wk); Naseem Shah; Imad Wasim; Fakhar Zaman

== T20I series ==
=== 1st T20I ===
22 May 2024
18:30 (N)
Scorecard

England	v	Pakistan

Match abandoned
Headingley, Leeds
Umpires: Russell Warren (Eng) and Alex Wharf (Eng)

- No toss.
- No play was possible due to rain.

=== 2nd T20I ===
25 May 2024
14:30
Scorecard

England; 183/7 (20 overs)	v	Pakistan; 160 (19.2 overs)
Jos Buttler 84 (51); Shaheen Afridi 3/36 (4 overs)		Fakhar Zaman 45 (21); Reece Topley 3/41 (3.2 overs)

England won by 23 runs
Edgbaston, Birmingham
Umpires: Mike Burns (Eng) and Martin Saggers (Eng)
Player of the match: Jos Buttler (Eng)

- Pakistan won the toss and elected to field.
- Jos Buttler (Eng) scored his 3,000th run in T20Is.

=== 3rd T20I ===
28 May 2024
18:30 (D/N)
Scorecard

England	v	Pakistan

Match abandoned
Sophia Gardens, Cardiff
Umpires: Mike Burns (Eng) and Russell Warren (Eng)

- No toss.
- No play was possible due to rain.

=== 4th T20I ===
30 May 2024
18:30 (N)
Scorecard

Pakistan; 157 (19.5 overs)	v	England; 158/3 (15.3 overs)
Usman Khan 38 (21); Liam Livingstone 2/17 (3 overs)		Phil Salt 45 (25); Haris Rauf 3/38 (3.3 overs)

England won by 7 wickets
The Oval, London
Umpires: Mike Burns (Eng) and Martin Saggers (Eng)
Player of the match: Adil Rashid (Eng)

- England won the toss and elected to field.
- Babar Azam (Pak) scored his 4,000th run in T20Is.
