= Yekooche First Nation =

- Band No. 728
- Yekoochet’en
- People: Dakelh
- Headquarters: 1830, 3rd Avenue, Prince George
- Province: British Columbia

Land
- Main reserve: Ye Koo Che 3
- Reserves: Ye Koos Lee 11; Nan Tl'at 13; Ucausley 16
- Land area: 32.26 km^{2} (12.46 sq mi)

Population (2025)
- On reserve: 93
- On other land: 12
- Off reserve: 118
- Total population: 223

Government
- Chief: Mitchell Joseph
- Council: Miranda Joseph; Austin Joseph; Mathew E. Joseph

Website
- yekooche.com

Yekooche First Nation is a band government of the Dakelh people, located 75 kilometres (47 mi) northwest of Fort St. James, British Columbia at the north end of Stuart Lake on Yekooche reserves (about 380 hectares in size). It is known in English as Portage due to its location along the portage route between Babine Lake and Stuart Lake.

Yekooche is a small community reserve. As of March 2019, there are 236 band members, 98 of whom live on the Yekooche reserves. Yekooche territory adjoins or encompasses Babine, Cunningham and Whitefish Lakes. These locales are used to hunt and to gather winter food for families.

The people of Yekooche are Dakelh and speak the Stuart Lake dialect of the Carrier language. Due to their proximity to Lake Babine territory, they have traditionally been bilingual in Babine-Witsuwit'en.

== History ==
Yekoochet'en people have lived in the region of Cunningham Lake for thousands of years. In fact, the Yekooche people's very name derives from the area—Ye Koo refers to Yeko Bun (Cunningham Lake) and Che describes the tail end of Nankut Creek.

Yekooche First nation was one of the five communities that made up the Tl'azt'en Nation band, from which it separated in 1994.

== Economy ==
Yekooche First Nation's main economic development project is the forestry program. Currently, the majority of people residing in Yekooche seek out social assistance programmes such as Work Opportunity Program, TESI and Basic Needs. Many young families are forced to leave Yekooche in search of employment and education opportunities. Yekooche First Nation has a band office, a health clinic, a resource house, a church, a graveyard, an elementary school, and about 50 houses. The Elementary school consists of the head start program, adult basic education, Carrier language courses, and Kindergarten to grade seven. The school has teacherages to allow the 3 school teachers to reside in Yekooche during the week.

=== Carrier Sekani Family Services ===
Although Yekooche First Nation is not part of the Carrier Sekani Tribal Council, it is part of Carrier Sekani Family Services. Yekooche First Nation and CSFS have an agreement for the health programme, whereby CSFS provides Yekooche with healthcare services including a nurse, dental care practitioners, doctor appointments, medical travel funds, workshops, clinic maintenance, etc.

== Negotiations ==
Yekooche First Nation started its treaty negotiations in 1995. The treaty team negotiated an Agreement in Principle in 2005, which the Nation agreed to. Yekooche First Nation is currently in Stage 5 of the British Columbia Treaty Process.

== Access ==
Yekooche First Nation can be reached by road, or by boat across Stuart Lake. An average water crossing takes 1.5 hours from Tache or 2.5 hours from Fort St. James.
