= Lelu Island (British Columbia) =

Island in British Columbia, Canada

Native name: Lax U’u’la
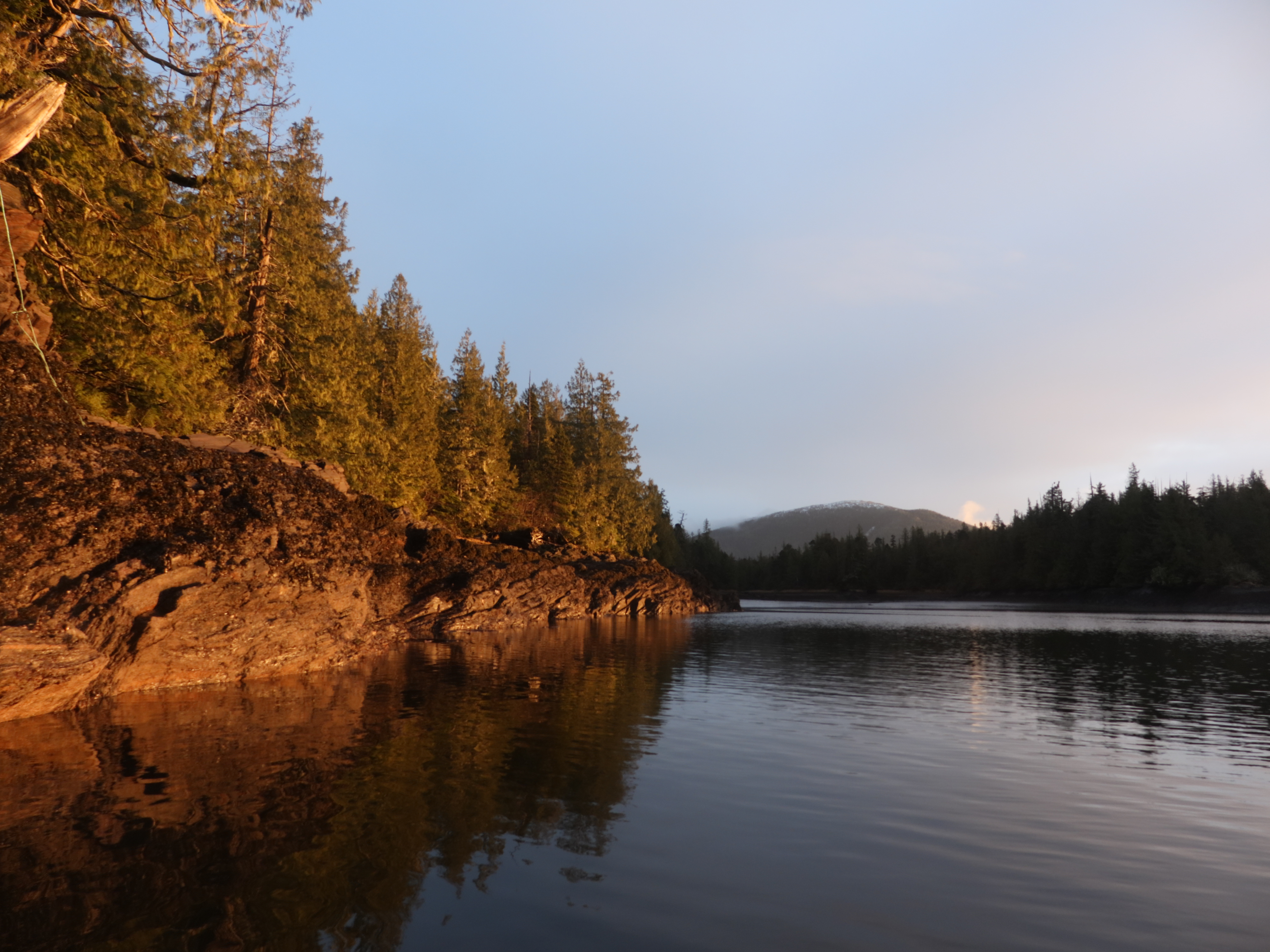
- Lelu Island at Sunset

- Location within British Columbia

Geography
- Coordinates: 54°11′59″N 130°17′19″W
- Area: 192 ha (470 acres)
- Highest elevation: 40 m (130 ft)

Lelu Island is an island of the Range 5 Coast Land District, of British Columbia, Canada, located in the Skeena Estuary between Smith and Ridley Islands. The island has gentle topography, with moderate perimeter woodland slopes rising to a central plateau, characterized by wetlands and bogs. Gitwilgyoots are reliant on the island for traditional food gathering and other cultural traditions.

Immediately southwest and associated with the island is the Flora Bank, a unique geomorphic feature supporting a critical fish habitat.

== Features ==
=== Range Marks ===
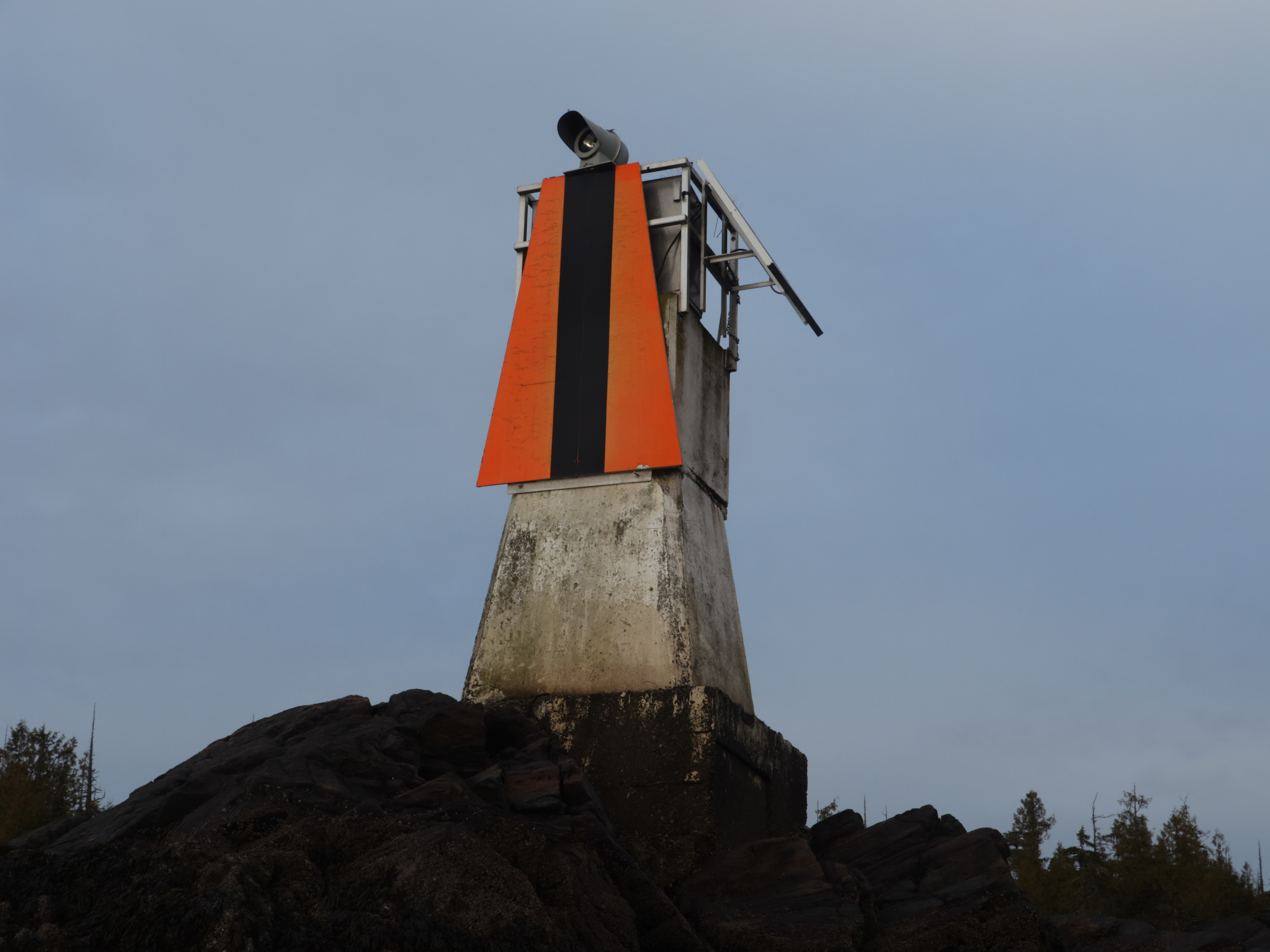
Range Light on northwest of Lelu Island, British Columbia

Due to the combination of strong tidal currents, and a narrow entrance to Port Edward, Lelu Island hosts three pairs of range marks. One pair of range lights on the northwest, guiding ships past the Agnew and Flora banks, while the other two pairs of daymarks are to the northeast, guiding ships through Porpoise Channel and Porpoise Harbour.

=== Culturally Modified Trees ===
Culturally Modified Trees are widely distributed on the island, dated across the range of 1830‍–‍1961. In the winter of 2015, a survey of approximately 550 were identified.

=== Lelu Wolf Totem ===
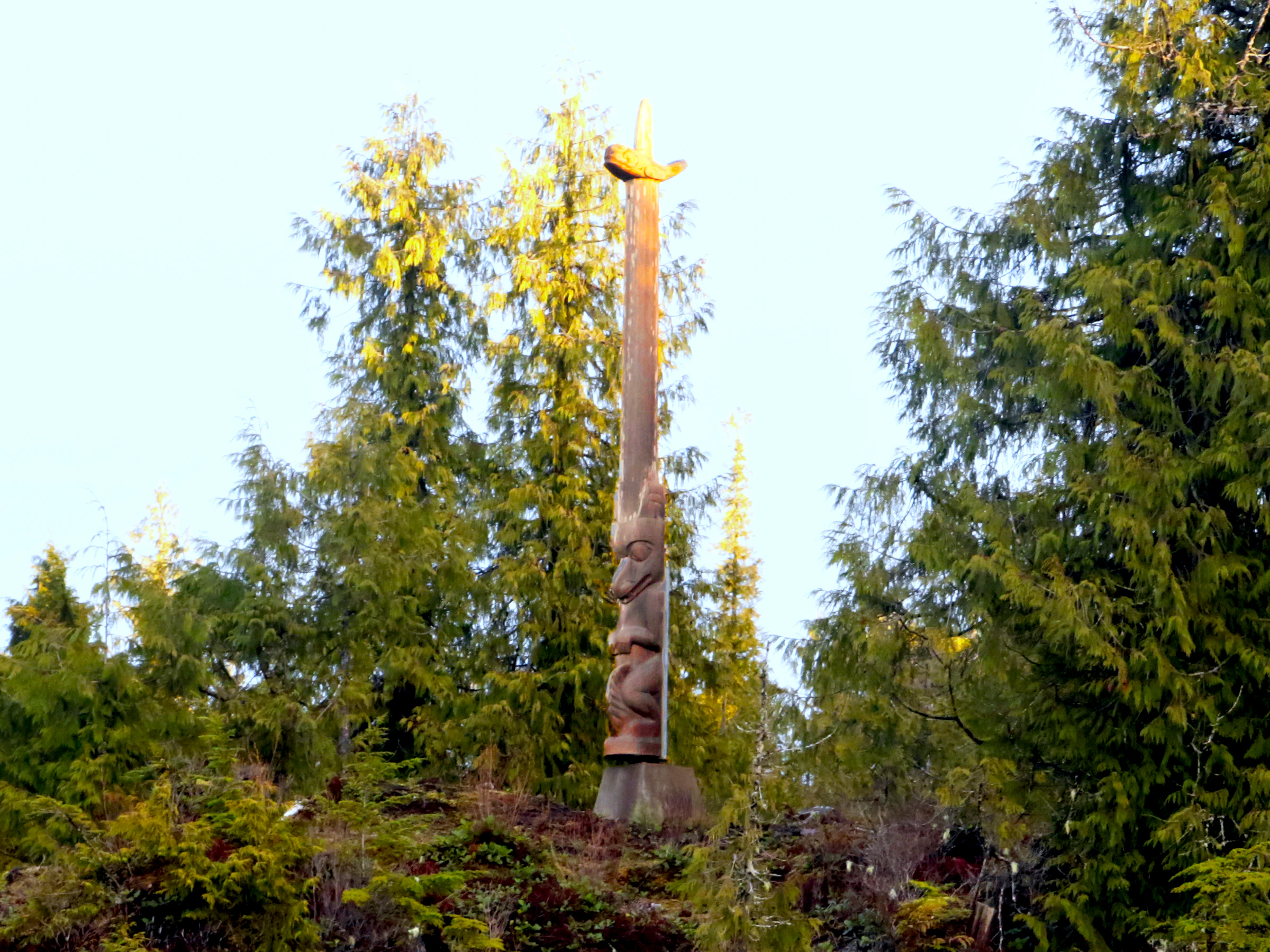
Lelu Wolf totem

Carved by Tsimshian artist Phil Gray, significant figures include a wolf (near the base) and also an orca (killer whale) fin near the top. The totem was blessed by Tsimshian of high ranking, the Nine Allied Tribes of the Lax Kw’alaams were involved in raising the totem, and the Prince Rupert Port Authority recognizes the cultural significance of the event.

=== Lelu Slough ===
The island is separated from the mainland by Lelu Slough. This is an intertidal slough of soft silt containing an estuarine channel. The slough contains the 11.45 ha (28.3 acres) Stapledon Island.

=== Indigenous Education ===
The island functions as a cultural camp aimed at teaching Tsimshian (Tsm’syen) lifeways, and as a forum to learn traditional teachings, cultural revitalization, and the health, and well-being of Tsm’syen communities on their land.

== History ==
In the Coast Tsimshian dialect, the island is referred to as Lax U’u’la in community and advocacy publications.

=== Development Moratorium ===
On 17 January 2019 the Prince Rupert Port Authority announced a twenty year moratorium prohibiting industrial development within the Flora, Agnew, and Horsey Banks, and the foreshore of Lelu Island.

=== Lelu Island Declaration ===
On 23 January 2016, Hereditary Chiefs across the Skeena watershed, and citizens of the Nine Allied Tribes of Lax Kw'alaams, signed the Lelu Island Declaration, declaring that Lelu Island, and Flora and Agnew Banks will be protected and held in trust for all time.

=== Pacific NorthWest LNG export facility ===
Petronas made a proposal for a liquefied natural gas export facility on this island in 2013. In September 2015, members of Lax Kw'alaams Nation began occupation of a camp on the island in opposition to the facility. In April 2016, the Prince Rupert Port Authority ordered a stop to construction of the camp. In September 2016, the Canadian federal government approved the project with 190 conditions, but members of the Lax Kw'alaams nation maintained their camp opposing the project.

The proposal had previously been opposed by unanimous vote but then supported by John Helin the mayor of the Lax Kw'alaams First Nation while still finding opposition among its hereditary chiefs, and is supported by Premier of British Columbia Christy Clark.

On July 25, 2017, Petronas announced they were abandoning the proposed export facility. The reasons for ending the project included market factors as well as political opposition.

== In Media ==
The resistance of Lax Kwʼalaams is the subject of a short documentary, A Last Stand for Lelu, which premiered on 15 February 2016 at the Vancouver International Mountain Film Festival.
