= Flora Bank =

Canadian underwater geological formation

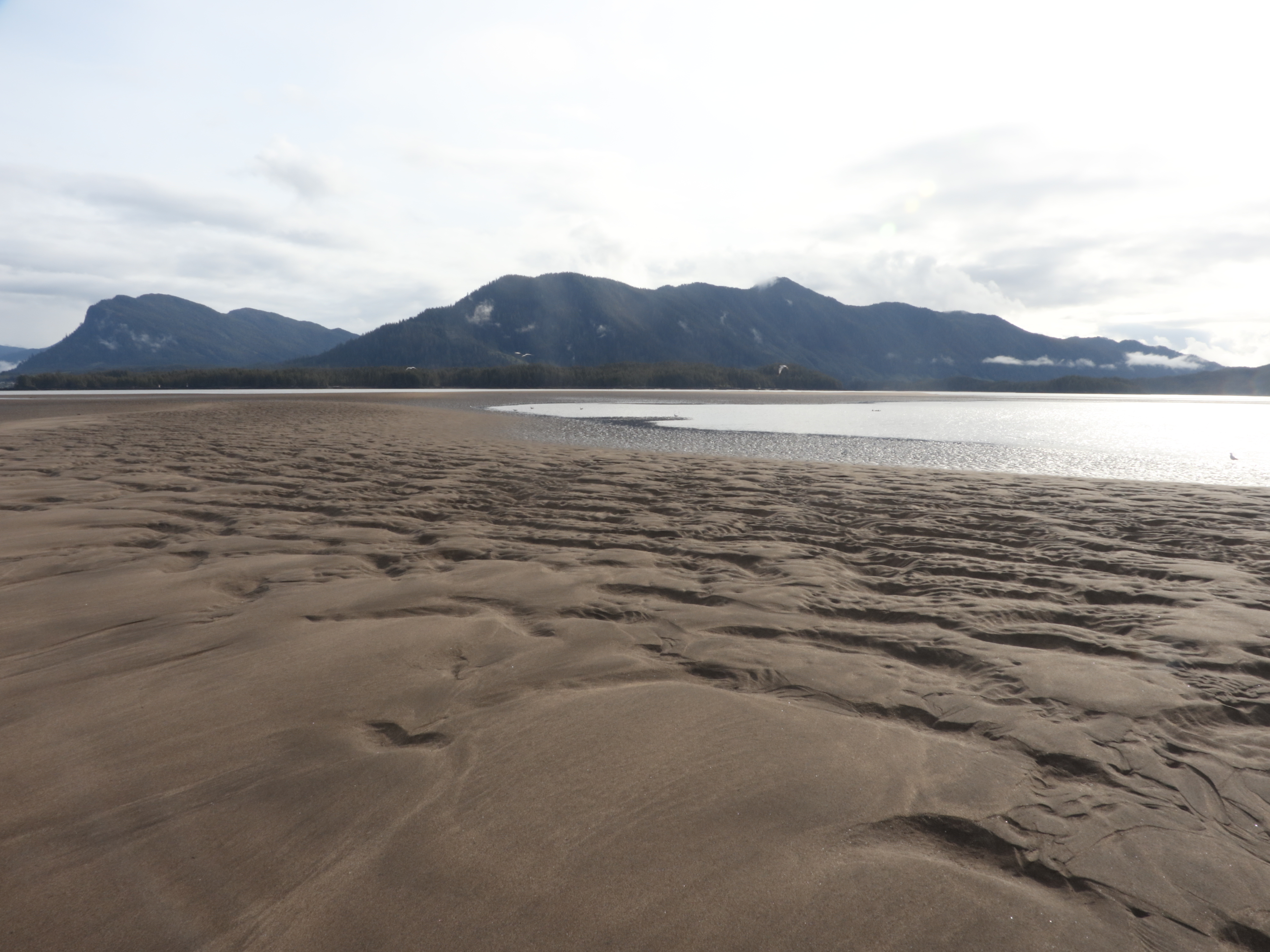
- Flora Bank at low tide
- Interactive map of Flora Bank
- Coordinates: 54°11′N 130°18′W
- Max. length: 2.3 kilometres (1.4 mi)
- Max. width: 1.7 kilometres (1.1 mi)
- Surface area: 4 km^{2} (1.5 sq mi)

Flora Bank is a bank in British Columbia, Canada, located at the edge of Chatham Sound, between Lelu and Kitson Islands at the north entrance to Inverness Passage, south of Prince Rupert. Flora Bank is a is wide, flat, and very shallow feature, mostly at or just below sea level, because of the large tidal range in the area, it may be exposed at low tides.

The bank was named after Miss Flora MacDonald, daughter of the manager of Inverness Cannery.

The bank is associated wit the nearby Agnew Bank, which extends and diversifies Flora Bank's vegetated (seagrass meadow) ecosystem with non-vegetated (soft sediment) habitats.

== Ecology ==
Flora Bank is recognized as one of the largest eelgrass beds in British Columbia, representing 50–60% of tidal and subtidal eelgrass habitat in the Skeena estuary, and the Canadian Department of Fisheries and Oceans have identified the area as important habitats for Skeena River juvenile salmon, as well as important eulachon habitat. Flora Bank is known as a critical habitat for juvenile epibenthic feeder species, such as chum, chinook, and pink salmon, which spend the early part of their marine life in shallow eelgrass beds and sheltered subestuaries.

== Geography ==
A unique geomorphic feature, there is no geomorphological term or name that can be applied to define Flora Bank. While the sediments of the Flora Bank are from 8000-year-old glacial deposits, the processes sustaining the bank by holding its sediments in place are still not fully understood.

== Hydrology ==
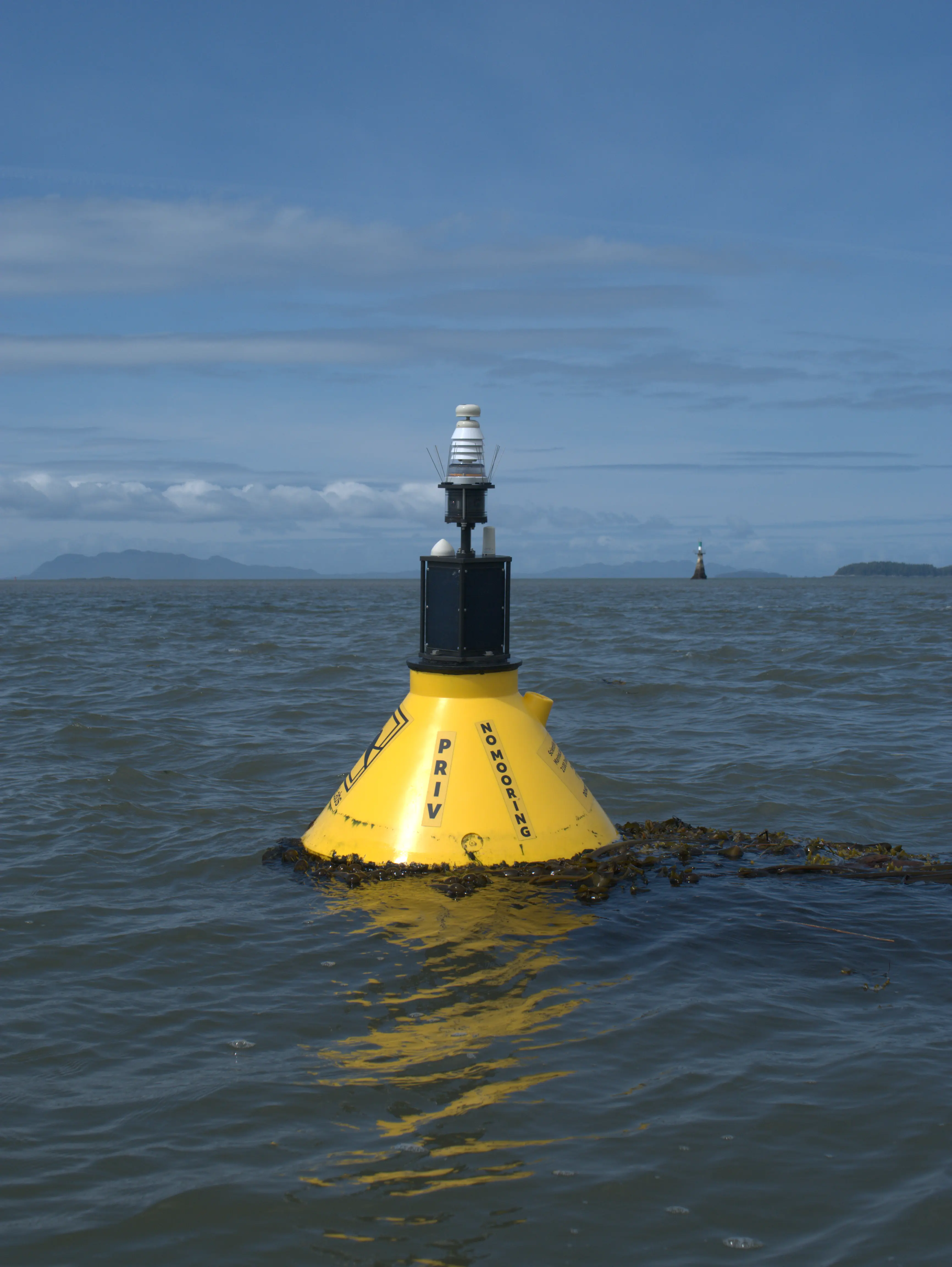
MarineLabs CoastScout sensor buoy north of bank

MarineLabs operates a CoastScout sensor buoy off the north end of the bank.
