= BC Bus North =

State-owned intercity bus company of British Columbia, Canada

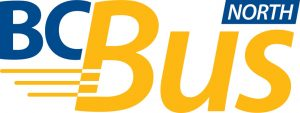

Overview
- Owner: Province of British Columbia; BC Transit
- Area served: Highway 16 Corridor, Highway 97
- Locale: Northern British Columbia
- Transit type: Intercity Bus
- Number of lines: 4
- Line number: 100, 200, 300, 400
- Number of stations: 38
- Website: bcbus.ca

Operation
- Began operation: June 2018

BC Bus North is a public intercity bus service created by the Province of British Columbia after Greyhound Canada cancelled all services in British Columbia, leaving the Highway 16 and Highway 97 corridors without passenger transportation options. In its first month of operation, June 2018, the service saw 300 riders, while its second month saw an increase to 450 riders. While BC Transit does not operate BC Bus North or share branding, BC Bus North is listed as a public transit system by BC Transit.

== Routes ==
BC Bus North operates four routes. Not all stops are listed below.

- Prince George - Prince Rupert: Twice weekly service on highway 16 through Vanderhoof, Burns Lake, Smithers, Terrace, and Port Edward, and many other intermediate stops.
- Prince George - Valemount: Twice weekly service on highway 16 through McBride and Tête Jaune Cache.
- Prince George - Fort St. John: Twice weekly service on highway 97 through Mackenzie, Chetwynd, Dawson Creek, and six other intermediate stops.
- Fort St. John - Fort Nelson: Twice weekly service with four intermediate stops.

== See also ==
- Jasper-Prince Rupert train, a Via Rail service in northern British Columbia
