= Don Topley =

English cricketer

Personal information
- Full name: Thomas Donald Topley
- Born: 25 February 1964 (age 62); Canterbury, Kent, England
- Nickname: Toppers
- Batting: Right-handed
- Bowling: Right-arm medium-fast
- Role: Bowler
- Relatives: Reece Topley (son); Peter Topley (brother)

Domestic team information
- Years: Team
- 1984–1985: Norfolk
- 1985: Surrey
- 1985–1994: Essex
- 1987/88: Griqualand West

Career statistics
Competition	First-class	List A
Matches	120	158
Runs scored	1,693	452
Batting average	15.53	9.04
100s/50s	0/4	0/0
Top score	66	38*
Balls bowled	19,422	7,428
Wickets	367	197
Bowling average	27.64	26.39
5 wickets in innings	15	2
10 wickets in match	2	0
Best bowling	7/75	6/33
Catches/stumpings	70/–	32/–
- Source: CricInfo, 28 August 2011

Thomas Donald Topley (born 25 February 1964) is an English former professional cricketer.

== Career ==
Initially employed as an MCC Young Professional at Lord's in 1984, he was selling scorecards one minute, and then the next fielding as 12th man substitute fielder for the 1984 Lord's Test match involving England vs West Indies. During this game, Topley gained notoriety for a splendid one handed catch on the boundary from a shot by Malcolm Marshall that did not count, as his foot was on the boundary rope. Topley played for Norfolk, Surrey and Griqualand West, as well as his 10-year career with Essex.

As a right-arm medium-fast bowler, Topley took 564 wickets at the top level of county cricket before being released from his contract in 1994, whereupon he made accusations that two 1991 county matches were fixed. Together with Guy Lovell, Topley took part in an interview with the Sunday Mirror stating that during matches against Lancashire, Essex were approached by the opposing team and accepted their offer of throwing one match in the Sunday League in return for Lancashire throwing the two sides' next encounter in the County Championship. The Test and County Cricket Board reported that they had found no substance to the revelations.

Topley was also an international coach with Zimbabwe from 1990 to 1992, after spending many winters playing and coaching all over southern Africa. In this capacity he helped Zimbabwe to upset England in a group match at the 1992 Cricket World Cup, placing him in the unusual position of helping to defeat England's captain Graham Gooch who was also his county captain at Essex. This match occurred between Gooch and Topley combining on the same side in Essex's triumphs in the County Championship in 1991 and 1992.

Being an alumnus of the Royal Hospital School in Suffolk, he returned there after his career as Master i/c cricket.

Today Topley commentates on the domestic game of cricket, and is often found on the after dinner speaking circuit. He also hosts overseas supporters' cricket tours following the England team.

== Personal life ==
His brother, Peter Topley, had a brief career for Kent and his son, Reece Topley, is a left-arm fast-bowler who has played for Essex, Hampshire, Sussex, Surrey and the England one-day team.
