= Peter Topley =

English cricketer

Personal information
- Full name: Peter Aland Topley
- Born: 29 August 1950 (age 76); Canterbury, Kent, England
- Batting: Right-handed
- Bowling: Slow left-arm orthodox
- Relatives: Don Topley (brother); Reece Topley (nephew)

Domestic team information
- Years: Team
- 1972–1975: Kent

Career statistics
Competition	First-class	List A
Matches	19	3
Runs scored	184	–
Batting average	12.26	–
100s/50s	0/0	–
Top score	38*	–
Balls bowled	1,316	–
Wickets	15	–
Bowling average	49.40	–
5 wickets in innings	0	–
10 wickets in match	0	–
Best bowling	2/28	–
Catches/stumpings	19/–	0/–
- Source: Cricinfo, 21 April 2011

Peter Aland Topley (born 29 August 1950) is a former English cricketer. Topley was a right-handed batsman who bowled slow left-arm orthodox. He was born at Canterbury, Kent.

Topley made his first-class debut for Kent against Warwickshire at Hesketh Park, Dartford, in the 1972 County Championship. He made seventeen further first-class appearances for the county, the last of which came against Middlesex in the 1975 County Championship. In his eighteen first-class appearances for Kent, he scored a total of 150 runs at an average of 10.71, with a high score of 38 not out. With the ball, he took 14 wickets at a bowling average of 47.78, with best figures of 2/28. Topley also made a single first-class appearance in 1973 for the Marylebone Cricket Club against Kent, scoring 34 runs and taking a single wicket. In addition to playing first-class cricket, Topley also made three List A appearances for Kent, against Glamorgan in 1972, Derbyshire in 1973, and Worcestershire in 1975.

His brother, Don, and nephew, Reece Topley, have both played first-class cricket.

Since retiring from cricket Topley has worked as a driving instructor in Canterbury.
