= Fixed-point ocean observatory =

Cable-anchored system of ocean sensors

An example of a fixed-point ocean observatory, with several sensors and a communicating buoy

A fixed-point ocean observatory is an ocean observing autonomous system of automatic sensors and samplers that continuously gathers data from deep sea, water column and lower atmosphere, and transmits the data to shore in real or near real-time.

== Infrastructure ==
Fixed-point ocean observatories are typically composed of a cable anchored to the sea floor to which several automatic sensors and samplers are attached. The cable ends with a buoy at the ocean surface that may have some more sensors attached. Most observatories have communicating buoys that transmit data to shore, and which allow changes to the acquisition method of the sensors, as required.

These unmanned platforms can be linked via a cable to the shore transmitting data via an internet connection, or they can transmit data to relay buoys which are able to provide a satellite link to the shore.

An example for a network of observatories is the Ocean Observatories Initiative.

== Instrumentation ==
A typical multi-disciplinary observatory is equipped with sensors and instruments to measure physical and biogeochemical variables along the water column. Additionally the surface buoy can hold several sensors measuring atmospheric parameters at sea level. Main measured variables:

Sea surface	Sea-surface temperature (SST) Sea-surface salinity (SSS); Sea level Sea state Sea ice Current; Ocean colour (for biological activity); Carbon dioxide partial pressure (pCO2); Dissolved oxygen
Sub-surface	Temperature Salinity; Current; Nutrients; Carbon; Ocean tracers Phytoplankton; Turbidity; Pressure (used to measure depth)
Atmosphere (Surface)	Air Temperature; Atmosphere Pressure at Sea Level; Relative Humidity; Wind Speed; Wind Direction; Solar Radiation

In order to do so, typically the ocean observatories are equipped with instruments like:

- ADCP – Acoustic Doppler current profiler, to measure currents;
- CTD (conductivity, temperature and depth) sensors, to measure conductivity and thermal variations at a known depth;
- Hydrophone – to record sounds;
- Sediment Trap – to quantify the quantity of sinking material;
- Deep sea camera – to capture footage on location;
- Seismometer – to record the earth motion;
- CO_{2} analyser – to measure CO_{2};
- Dissolved Oxygen sensor – to measure dissolved oxygen;
- Fluorometers – to measure Chlorophyll;
- Turbidity sensor – to measure turbidity.

== Purpose ==
Ocean observatories can collect data for different purposes from scientific research to environmental monitoring for marine operations or governance for the benefit of economy and society as a whole. Ocean observatories provide real-time, or near real time data allowing to detect changes as they happen, such as geo-hazards for example. Furthermore, continuous time series data allow to investigate interannual-to-decadal changes and to capture episodic events, changes in ocean circulation, water properties, water mass formation and ecosystems, to quantify air-sea fluxes, and to analyse the role of the oceans for the climate.

The data collected by the several ocean observatories around the globe on the sub-sea-floor, seafloor, and water column, allows to improve our knowledge of the ocean including:

1. Ocean physics and climate change
2. Biodiversity and ecosystem assessment
3. Carbon cycle and ocean acidification
4. Geophysics and geodynamics

Moreover, networks of ocean observatories can also be used to input data into global ocean models and to calibrate them thus allowing for the investigation of future changes in ocean circulation and ecosystems.

== See also ==
- VENUS Canada, an ocean observatory operated by Ocean Networks Canada.
- NEPTUNE Canada, a sister observatory to VENUS, also operated by Ocean Networks Canada.
- MARS, a similar MBARI cabled-based oceanography observatory.
- SATURN, Science and Technology University Research Network, a coastal margin, or river-to-ocean, testbed observatory for the United States Pacific Northwest, a project of the National Science Foundation Science and Technology Center for Coastal Margin Observation and Prediction.
- Ocean development
