= Babine (alcoholic drink) =

Babine is a sparkling alcoholic drink originating from Zaire. It is made from the leaves of the avocado tree.
