= Reece Topley =

English cricketer (born 1994)

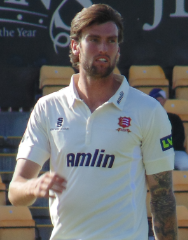

Personal information
- Full name: Reece James William Topley
- Born: 21 February 1994 (age 32); Ipswich, Suffolk, England
- Height: 6 ft 7 in (2.01 m)
- Batting: Right-handed
- Bowling: Left-arm Fast-medium
- Role: Bowler
- Relatives: Don Topley (father); Peter Topley (uncle)

International information
- National side: England (2015–present)
- ODI debut (cap 243): 13 September 2015 v Australia
- Last ODI: 6 November 2024 v West Indies
- ODI shirt no.: 38 (formerly 23)
- T20I debut (cap 74): 31 August 2015 v Australia
- Last T20I: 9 November 2024 v West Indies
- T20I shirt no.: 38 (formerly 23)

Domestic team information
- Years: Team
- 2011–2015: Essex (squad no. 6)
- 2016–2018: Hampshire (squad no. 6)
- 2019: Sussex (squad no. 23)
- 2020–present: Surrey (squad no. 24)
- 2021–2022: Oval Invincibles (squad no. 23)
- 2021/22: Melbourne Renegades
- 2023-2024: Durban's Super Giants
- 2023–2024: Royal Challengers Bangalore
- 2023–2024: Northern Superchargers (squad no. 23)
- 2025: Mumbai Indians
- 2025: Southern Brave (squad no. 17)
- 2025/26: Sydney Thunder
- 2026: Joburg Super Kings
- 2026: Sunrisers Leeds

Career statistics
Competition	ODI	T20I	FC	LA
Matches	30	35	51	75
Runs scored	35	17	152	82
Batting average	11.66	8.50	4.22	10.25
100s/50s	0/0	0/0	0/0	0/0
Top score	15*	9	16	19
Balls bowled	1,392	706	8,611	3,487
Wickets	47	33	169	124
Bowling average	26.74	29.63	28.54	25.91
5 wickets in innings	1	0	8	1
10 wickets in match	0	0	2	0
Best bowling	6/24	3/22	6/29	6/24
Catches/stumpings	7/–	6/–	9/–	18/–
Medal record
Men's Cricket
Representing England
ICC Men's T20 World Cup
Runner-up	2016 India
- Source: CricketArchive, 27 September 2026

Reece James William Topley (born 21 February 1994) is an English international cricketer who plays for the England cricket team in white ball cricket as a left-arm fast medium bowler. He plays for Surrey in domestic cricket. Topley debuted for England in August 2015 against Australia, and represented the team at both the 2016 ICC World Twenty20 and 2023 Cricket World Cup. He plays for the Mumbai Indians in the Indian Premier League.

== Background ==
He was born on 21 February 1994 in Ipswich. He was educated at the Royal Hospital School. His father, Don Topley, was a first-class cricketer for Essex and Surrey. His father was also one of his teachers at Royal Hospital School, where he is a master of cricket. His uncle, Peter Topley, was also a first-class cricketer.

== Domestic and franchise career ==
In June 2009, aged 15, Topley made the headlines when he was injured bowling in the nets at Loughborough University to England batsman Kevin Pietersen. Pietersen flat drove a delivery, which ended up striking Topley on the side of the head, knocking him to the ground. He was taken to Leicester Royal Infirmary where he required stitches to his ear and was kept in hospital overnight. Following the incident, Pietersen, whom Topley cited as his favourite player, gave the youngster his cricket bat with his signature on.

A product of the Essex youth cricket system, Topley made his first-class debut for Essex against Cambridge MCCU in the 2011 season. He impressed on County Championship debut against Kent, taking his maiden five wicket haul when he took figures of 5/46 in Kent's second-innings of the match. In the following championship match against Middlesex he his second five wicket haul, with figures of 5/64 in Middlesex's first-innings. In May 2011, he signed a one-year professional contract with Essex. That month also saw Topley make his List A debut against the Unicorns in the Clydesdale Bank 40, with Topley claiming his maiden wicket in that format, that of Robin Lett.

Mid-season Topley took a break from county cricket to return to Royal Hospital School to revise for his summer exams. However, during his break he was called up to play for England Under-19s for their Youth One Day International series against South Africa Under-19s. He returned to action for Essex in August, to date he has played two List A matches and nine first-class matches. He has made a good start to his first-class career, taking to date 34 wickets at an average of 23.55. The start to his career drew praise from former England captain Michael Vaughan, who stated that Topley could become a future Test cricketer.

On 1 September 2015, Hampshire County Cricket Club confirmed the signing of Topley from Essex at the end of the 2015 season. At the end of the 2018 season and yet another stress fracture, Topley underwent back surgery.

In IPL 2021, he was asked for being a replacement for injured Josh Hazlewood by Chennai Super Kings, but he denied the offer as the cricketer feared by the hike of COVID-19 cases in India. In 2021, he was drafted by Oval Invincibles for the inaugural season of The Hundred. In December 2021, he was signed by Islamabad United following the players' draft for the 2022 Pakistan Super League.

In April 2022, he was bought by the Oval Invincibles for the 2022 season of The Hundred.

He is bought by Royal Challengers Bangalore to play in the IPL 2023 season for INR. 1.90 Crore in the IPL auction held on 23 December 2022. In the first match of the 2023 season against Mumbai Indians he sustained a dislocated shoulder injury and was ruled out of the whole IPL season.

In 2023 he was bought by the Northern Superchargers for the 2023 season of The Hundred.

In 2024, he and his teammate from Royal Challengers Bangalore, Will Jacks, withdrew from the final stages of the IPL due to international duties.

He was selected to play for Sylhet Strikers in 2025 Bangladesh Premier League. In 2025, he was recruited by the Mumbai Indians for the 2025 IPL season.

== International career ==
He made his Twenty20 International debut against Australia on 31 August 2015 and his One Day International debut, also against Australia, on 13 September 2015, taking figures of 0-33.

He kept his place in the ODI team for the series against Pakistan and played in all four matches. He picked up his first international wickets in the first match and finished with figures of 3-26, although it wasn't enough to prevent an England defeat. He had picked up one wicket in each of the next three matches, with England winning all three games. He played in the first T20 international between the two teams, and finished with figures of 3-24.

He continued his role in the ODI team for the tour of South Africa, and again played every game in the series. He took figures of 1–43 in the first game, as England won by 39 runs on the DL Method. In the next game he took figures of 4–50 to help England to back to back wins. England lost the next three games of the series, although Topley performed well, taking figures of 2–39 in the fourth match of the series and 3–41 in the final match, which South Africa won by 5 wickets. He played in both T20 internationals, although he didn't take a wicket in either game.

He kept his place in the England team for the T20 World Cup, but was expensive in the first game against the West Indies, taking figures of 1–22 in 2.1 overs. He was expensive in the next match against South Africa, bowling two overs for 33 runs. He was replaced in the team by Liam Plunkett and did not play in the tournament again. Topley was part of that successful T20 squad that was defeated in the World Cup Final in India, but upon returning home was found to have a stress fracture in his back.

On 26 March 2021, Topley returned to the England starting XI in the second ODI against India at Pune. He took 2-50 from 8 overs. In October 2021, Topley was added to England's squad for the 2021 ICC Men's T20 World Cup as a travelling reserve.

On 14 July 2022, in the second match against India, Topley took his first five-wicket haul and the best bowling figures for England in an ODI match with 6 for 24.

In May 2024, he was named in England’s squad for the 2024 ICC Men's T20 World Cup tournament.

== Hollywood Cricket ==
Topley launched fashion brand Hollywood Cricket in 2026.
