= Port Edward, British Columbia =

Port Edward
- District municipality
- District of Port Edward
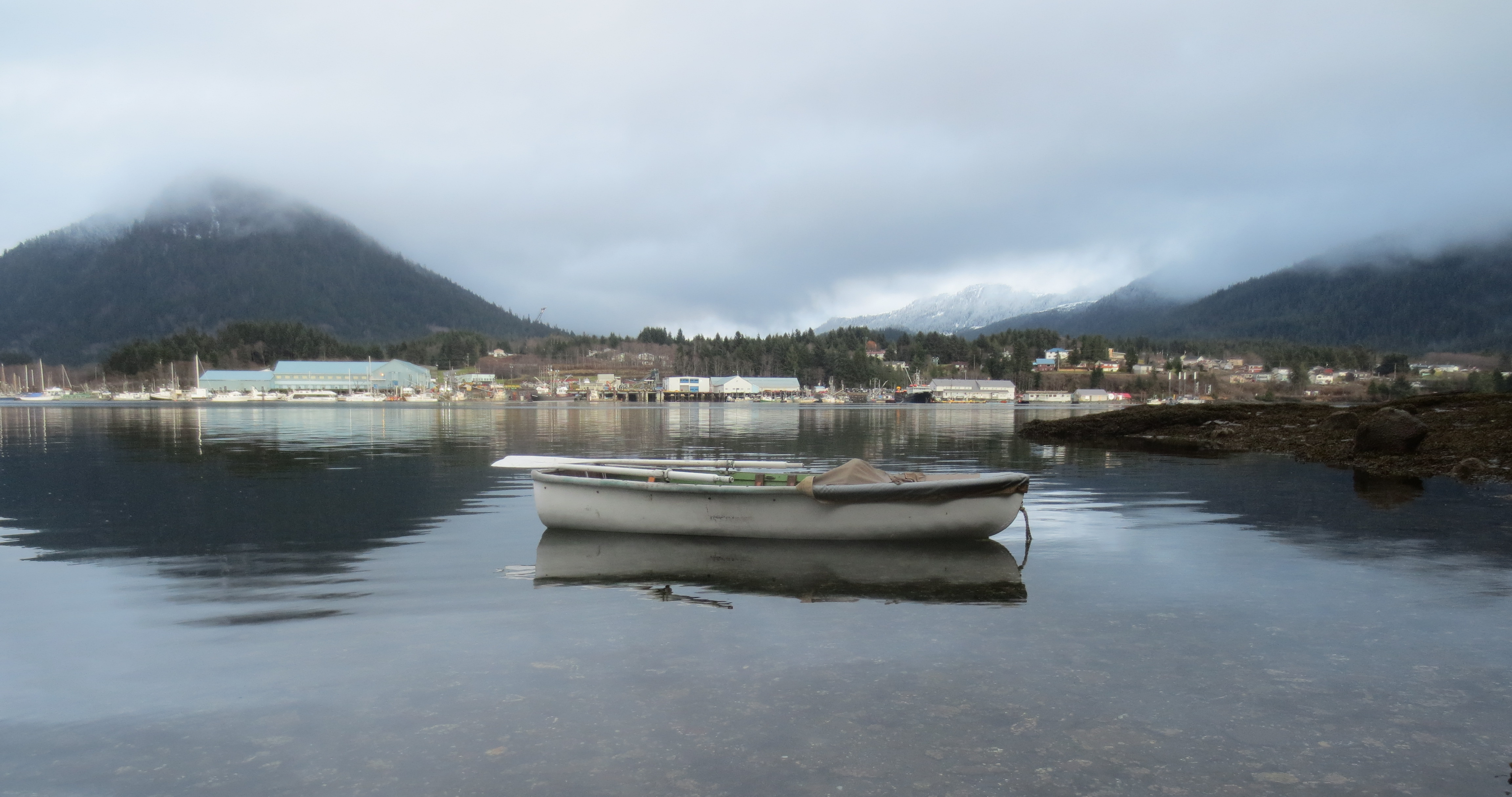
- Port Edward, British Columbia as seen from across Porpoise Harbour
- Interactive map of Port Edward
- Coordinates: 54°13′14″N 130°17′22″W
- Country: Canada
- Province: British Columbia
- Regional district: North Coast
- Incorporated (village): 1966-06-29
- Incorporated (district): 1991-04-17

Area
  - Total: 168.01 km^{2} (64.87 sq mi)

Population (2021)
  - Total: 470
  - Density: 2.8/km^{2} (7.2/sq mi)
- Time zone: UTC−07:00 (PT)
- Postal code: V0V 1G0
- Highways: Highway 16 (TCH)
- Website: www.portedward.ca

The District of Port Edward is a district municipality of 16,812 hectares (41,540 acres), located in the Range 5 Coast Land District of British Columbia, Canada. It is situated near the southern end of Chatham Sound, close to the mouth of the Skeena River, on the Tsimpsean Peninsula between Mount Stewart, Mount McDonald, and Porpoise Harbour.

== Directions ==
The City of Prince Rupert is 15 kilometres (9.3 mi) to the northwest, while the City of Terrace is 135 kilometres (84 mi) to the northeast. BC Transit provides a bus service from Prince Rupert, while BC Bus North and VIA Rail provide bus and rail services from the City of Prince George.

== Geology ==
Port Edward lies on the Tsimpsean Peninsula of northwest coastal British Columbia, within the Canadian Cordillera, formed by the accretion of multiple terranes onto the western edge of North America during the Cretaceous. The region lies in a shear zone between the Alexander and Nisling terranes.

During the Last Glacial Maximum, the region was covered by 1 to 2 kilometres (0.62 to 1.24 mi) ice sheets. After deglaciation, sea levels from 50 metres (160 ft) above present levels gradually dropped to current levels by the Lithic stage. Current surface geology in the district includes glacial deposits, as well as Skeena River and estuarine sediments.

== Ecology ==
The district occupies a unique ecological crossroads where pacific temperate rainforests, coastal estuaries, and marine coastal ecosystem converge. Rainforests of western hemlock, Sitka spruce, and western red cedar provide diverse habitats for a diverse fungal community, including chanterelles, hedgehog mushrooms, and shelf fungi, while the Skeena River estuary and tidal zones support critical salmon spawning grounds, migratory birds, and invertebrate communities. This sustains not only local wildlife, including black bears, river otters, and bald eagles, but also human communities that have traditionally relied on the abundance of marine and forest resources.

The associated aquatic and estuarine ecosystems provide essential nursery and migratory grounds. Harbour porpoises are known to reside year‑round in these waters. Local intertidal zones, mudflats and eelgrass beds sustain populations of clams, mussels, barnacles, dungeness crabs, and benthic invertebrates.

== Economy ==
At one time sustained by the numerous canneries in the area, transportation and construction are now the mainstays of the local economy. The Port Edward Harbour Authority provides annual moorage for over 2000 vessels annually. Tourism is also important, with the North Pacific Cannery providing both a living museum and national heritage site within Port Edward.

Pembina Pipeline operates a propane rail terminal on Watson Island, moving propane from rail cars to tankers on Porpoise Harbour. The facility is staffed with 25 full time employees, and is licensed to load 25,000 barrels per day (4,000 m^{3}/d).

== History ==
Originally incorporated as Village Municipality on June 29, 1966, the townsite was re-incorporated as a District Municipality April 17, 1991, and is now called the District of Port Edward.

In 1942, the United States Army established the Port Edward staging base, containing two wharves and a loading pier with necessary rail connections, and facilities accommodating 10,000 troops. As a member of the Quartermaster Corps, Colonel Floyd W. Stewart oversaw the embarkation of 35,000 troops and civilian workers through to the Aleutian and Pacific theatres of war.

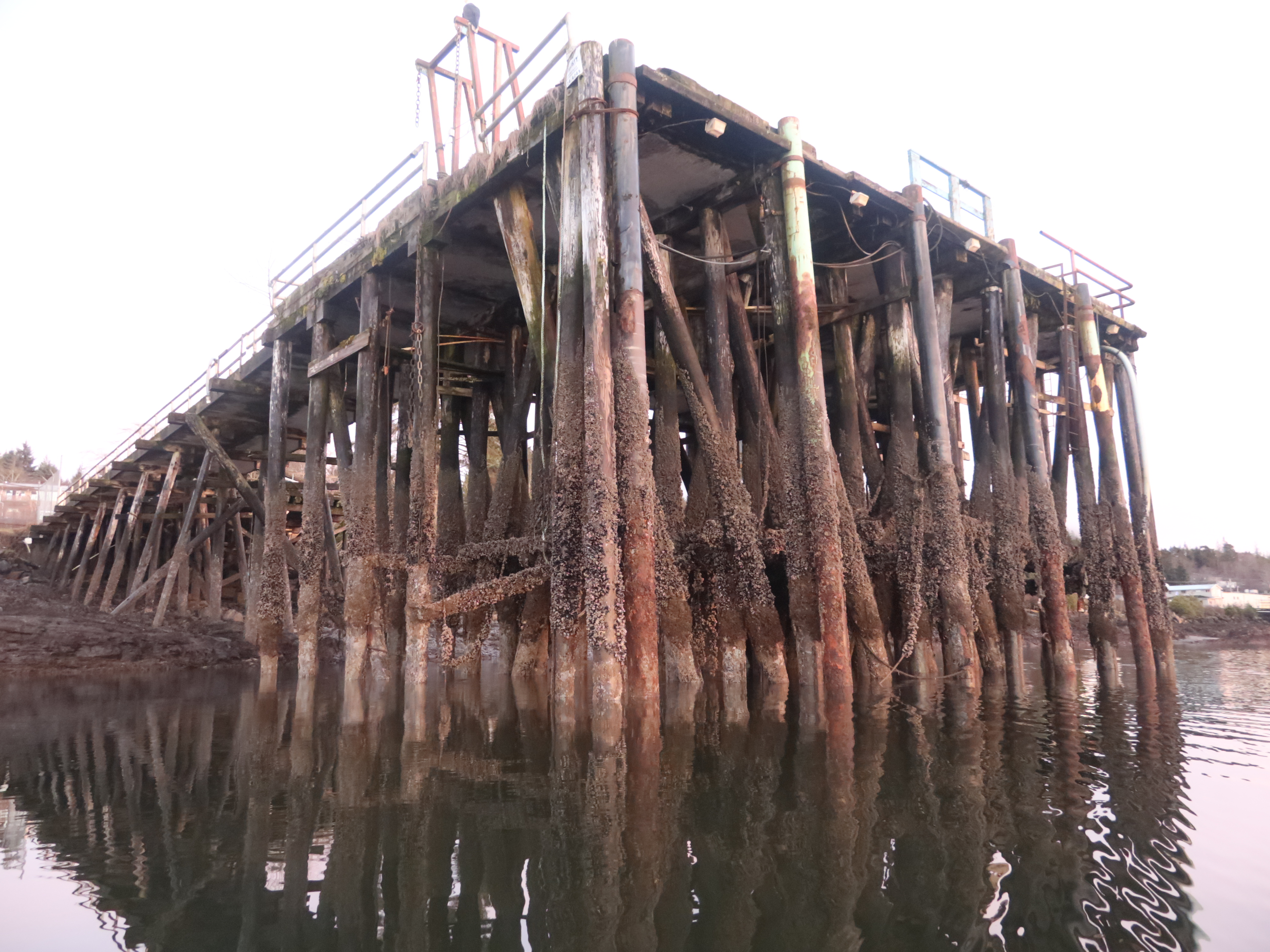
Remains of WWII era wharf in Port Edward, British Columbia

Watson Island also contained a major ammunition transshipment facility, it is estimated that over 100,000 tons of high-explosive ammunition were passed through to Alaska .

By the early 1960s Port Edward had become the largest northern salmon canning area. Commercial milestones include the installations of crab canning equipment in 1953, shellfish operations in 1959 and shrimp operations in 1961.

The Watson Island pulp mill began operations in 1951. Operations continued until the Skeena Cellulose pulp mill filed for bankruptcy in 2001.

Pacific Northwest LNG (PNW LNG) had been proposed for Lelu Island, adjacent to the townsite of Port Edward. The project was a major joint-venture between Malaysia's state oil and gas company, Petronas, and significant partners including Sinopec and JAPEX. This $11 billion (CAD) project, if constructed, would have brought significant economic activity to Port Edward. The project was cancelled on July 25, 2017.

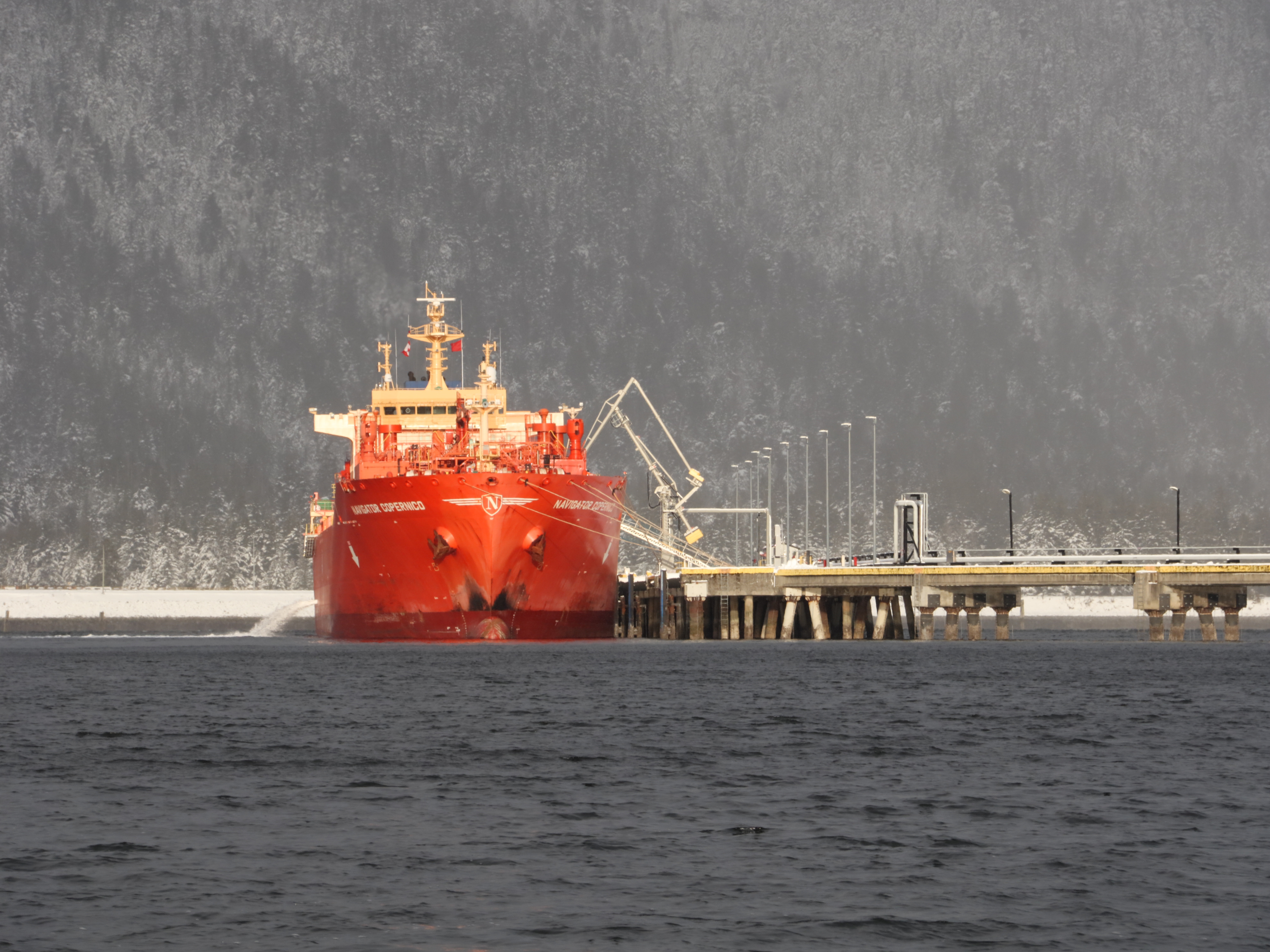
Propane Export Terminal on Watson Island

9 April 2021, Pembina Pipeline commenced exporting 20,000 barrels per day (3,200 m^{3}/d) from its liquefied natural gas terminal on Watson Island. This facility provided some of Canada's first large-scale propane shipments to South Korea.

== Demographics ==
In the 2021 Census of Population conducted by Statistics Canada, 49.4% of Port Edward's population identified as Indigenous, a proportion substantially higher than the Canadian average. The area now known as Port Edward lies within, or adjacent to, the overlapping traditional territories of several Tsimshian First Nations, including Gitxaała, Lax Kw'alaams, Metlakatla, Gitga'at, Kitselas, Kitsumkalum, and Kitasoo Xai'xais.

In 2021. the district had a population of 470 living in 181 of its 207 total private dwellings, a change of 0.6% from its 2016 population of 467. With a land area of 167.16 km^{2} (64.54 sq mi), it had a population density of 2.8/km^{2} (7.3/sq mi) in 2021.

== See also ==
- Royal eponyms in Canada
