= Topley Landing Provincial Park =

Provincial park in British Columbia, Canada

- IUCN category II (national park)
- Location within British Columbia
- Interactive map of Topley Landing Provincial Park
- Location: British Columbia, Canada
- Nearest city: Smithers
- Coordinates: 54°48′39″N 126°08′37″W
- Area: 0.12 km^{2} (0.046 sq mi)
- Established: April 17, 1964
- Governing body: BC Parks

Topley Landing Provincial Park is a provincial park near Topley Landing in British Columbia, Canada.

== Climate ==
Climate data for Topley Landing Provincial Park
Month	Jan	Feb	Mar	Apr	May	Jun	Jul	Aug	Sep	Oct	Nov	Dec	Year
Record high °C (°F)	10 (50)	12.8 (55.0)	16 (61)	23.9 (75.0)	33 (91)	32.8 (91.0)	34.4 (93.9)	33.5 (92.3)	31 (88)	24.5 (76.1)	17.8 (64.0)	10.5 (50.9)	34.4 (93.9)
Mean daily maximum °C (°F)	−6.5 (20.3)	−2.2 (28.0)	3.6 (38.5)	9.3 (48.7)	14.3 (57.7)	18 (64)	20.7 (69.3)	20.3 (68.5)	15.2 (59.4)	8.1 (46.6)	0.2 (32.4)	−4.5 (23.9)	8 (46)
Mean daily minimum °C (°F)	−14.1 (6.6)	−11.2 (11.8)	−7.1 (19.2)	−2.5 (27.5)	1.9 (35.4)	6 (43)	8.2 (46.8)	7.7 (45.9)	4 (39)	−0.2 (31.6)	−5.5 (22.1)	−11 (12)	−2 (28)
Record low °C (°F)	−41.7 (−43.1)	−36.5 (−33.7)	−35 (−31)	−20.6 (−5.1)	−10 (14)	−1.7 (28.9)	0 (32)	−1 (30)	−4.5 (23.9)	−20.5 (−4.9)	−34 (−29)	−41 (−42)	−41.7 (−43.1)
Average precipitation mm (inches)	54.1 (2.13)	35.4 (1.39)	28.4 (1.12)	23.5 (0.93)	38.1 (1.50)	56.2 (2.21)	47.6 (1.87)	43.6 (1.72)	41.3 (1.63)	49.2 (1.94)	57.2 (2.25)	58.6 (2.31)	533.1 (20.99)
Source: Environment Canada
