= Granisle =

- Village
- Village of Granisle
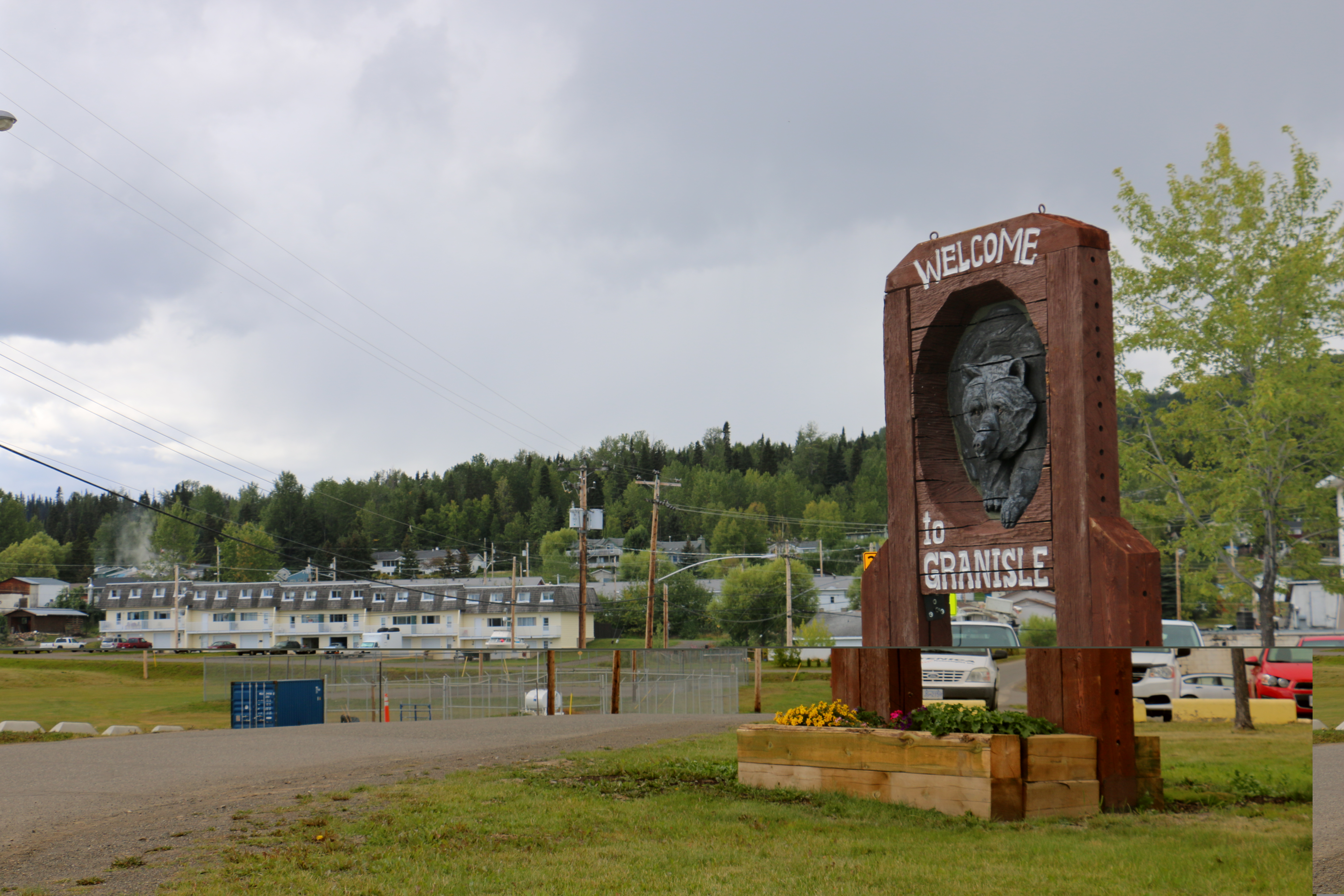

- Location of Granisle in British Columbia
- Coordinates: 54°53′13″N 126°12′25″W
- Country: Canada
- Province: British Columbia
- Region: BC Interior
- Regional district: Regional District of Bulkley-Nechako
- Incorporated: 1971

Government
  - Governing body: Granisle Village Council
  - Mayor: Linda McGuire

Area
  - Land: 39.85 km^{2} (15.39 sq mi)
- Elevation: 740 m (2,430 ft)

Population (2021)
  - Total: 337
  - Density: 8.5/km^{2} (22/sq mi)
- Time zone: UTC−07:00 (PT)
- Waterways: Babine Lake
- Website: www.granisle.ca

Granisle (/ˌɡræˈnaɪl/) is a village on Babine Lake in the Northern Interior of British Columbia, Canada, to the north of Topley between Burns Lake and Houston.

== History ==
The early inhabitants of the area were Carrier Indians, called "Babine" by the early explorers, referring to the distended ornamented lower lips of the native women.

The village of Granisle was founded in the late 1960s and early 1970s on the shores of Babine Lake as a home for the families of the miners working in the nearby copper mines. Granisle was incorporated as a village in 1971. At the height of its population, Granisle boasted approximately 3,000 people.

After the last mine shut down in 1992, the community transformed into a retirement destination. Tourism in the area also began to grow and is now the area's main industry.

In 1971 workmen excavating in an open-pit copper mine at Babine Lake discovered the partly articulated skeleton of a Columbian Mammoth. The bones were taken from silty pond deposits overlain by very thick boulder-clay deposited by the last glacier that covered the area. Radiocarbon dates indicate that the animal sank in sticky pond deposits about 34,000 years ago. A replica of some of the Mammoth's Bones can be seen at the Granisle Museum.

== Demographics ==
In the 2021 Census of Population conducted by Statistics Canada, Granisle had a population of 337 living in 194 of its 262 total private dwellings, a change of 11.2% from its 2016 population of 303. With a land area of 39.85 km^{2} (15.39 sq mi), it had a population density of 8.5/km^{2} (21.9/sq mi) in 2021.

Federal census population history - Granisle

Year	Pop.	±%
1971	515	—
1976	1,210	+135.0%
1981	1,430	+18.2%
1986	646	−54.8%
1991	803	+24.3%
1996	446	−44.5%

Year	Pop.	±%
2001	353	−20.9%
2006	364	+3.1%
2011	303	−16.8%
2016	303	+0.0%
2021	337	+11.2%

Source: Statistics Canada

== Village ==
Granisle had an ice hockey team in the now non-existent Pacific Northwest Hockey League.
