= Fort Babine =

Small native reserve community, Babine Lake, British Columbia

- Location of Fort Babine in British Columbia
- Coordinates: 55°19′04″N 126°37′29″W
- Country: Canada
- Province: British Columbia
- Region: Skeena/Omineca
- Regional district: Kitimat–Stikine

Area
  - Total: 1.8 km^{2} (0.69 sq mi)

Population (2021)
  - Total: 75
  - Density: 42/km^{2} (110/sq mi)
- Time zone: UTC-8 (PST)
  - Summer (DST): UTC-7 (PDT)

Fort Babine is an unincorporated community that borders the Skeena and Omineca regions of central British Columbia. This First Nations settlement is on the east shore of the Babine River at the northern tip of Babine Lake. By road, the location is about 105 kilometres (65 mi) northeast of Smithers.

== Forts ==
In 1822, on the north bank, where the lake forms two arms, the Hudson's Bay Company (HBC) founded the Babine Establishment (later known as Fort Kilmaurs, then Old Fort). Neither William Brown (who was in charge), nor John Stuart (his superior) undertook the proposed exploration that year of the Babine River out to the coast or the Chilcotin area, because motivation and manpower were lacking. The next year, under Brown were 1 clerk and a 5-man crew. During 1824–1826, Brown was able to explore to the coast.

Leather was a scarce trading commodity, because moose had not yet entered the region. The HBC obtained moose hides from trading districts east of the Canadian Rockies. The Babine-Wet'suwet'en desired high quality leather for funeral ceremonies, whereas the Dakelh used leather mainly for making clothing and sturdy moccasins, essential for hunting expeditions that procured furs to trade. First Nations would often refuse to trade if no leather was available at an HBC post. The demand was so great that it might be the sole item described among a general shipment of supplies.

In 1926, Joseph McGillivray replaced Brown, supervising 1 clerk and a 6-man crew. Supplies came northwestward by canoe from Fort St. James via the Babine Portage, while salmon returned southeastward. From the 1820s to the 1900s, the Babine Lake fisheries played a significant role.

In 1830, poor trading returns were recorded. To attract the Babine trade going elsewhere, the fort was relocated northward in 1836 from a village of about 150 people to a more centralized site and renamed Fort Babine. Under the charge of mixed-race William McBean, the old fort had been in a state of disrepair. McBean was also a lay preacher, who proclaimed a hybrid religion.

In 1842, William Morwick, who replaced McBean, was assigned the lower title of postmaster. Through his interpreter Charles Toin, Morwick had a heated argument six weeks later with a Babine man, who wanted to trade caribou meat for animal skins. When the negotiation over price resumed the next day, Toin challenged the man to a duel with pistols. When the man indicated his preference for a knife fight, Toin stepped backward, fired his pistol and lacerated the man's arm. In response, the man stabbed Toin in the arm. A false report that Morwick had shot the man to death prompted a relative to fatally shoot Morwick in the head. On news reaching Fort St. James, an 11-man posse under McBean hunted the perpetrator, who was shot dead on peacefully surrendering. After reparations were made, Duncan E. Cameron took charge of the fort, and McBean departed for his next posting.

Fearful of being drawn into inter-tribal unrest, Cameron resigned in 1845. His replacement D. McLean equally understood the vulnerability of his small 3-man crew. Peace came the next year, when Catholic missionary Father John Nobili stayed 12 days and returned for a few months in 1847.

In charge of the fort were Thomas Charles by 1850 and Gavin Hamilton by 1864.

1874 sketch by Harry Bullock-Webster in Fort Babine titled “Breaking in young dogs to harnesses”

By 1867, external and internal competition (such as the new HBC Ackwilgate post) (Roucher de Bouille) diminished returns.

In 1891, administrative oversight of the fort transferred from the New Caledonia to the Port Simpson district.

== Portage from Hazelton ==
During the Omineca Gold Rush, Capt. William Moore improved an old First Nations trail in 1871, which connected Hazelton (then known as the Forks) and Fort Babine. Over the following years, freight for the fort began coming via the Skeena River to The Forks, followed by a 64-kilometre (40 mi) portage. In 1876, delays resulted in a late arrival and diminished trade at the fort. From 1879, Fort St. James freight also largely came via the Skeena.

By 1889 the HBC contracted Vieth and Borland to operate the packtrains on the Hazelton–Babine portage. In 1897, the HBC were the only party interested in buying the endeavour for $4,760. In 1902, the HBC sold the operation to Cataline for $3,960, which comprised 46 mules and 4 horses. By 1905, he had recovered his investment. This packtrain trail ascended via the Bulkley and Suskwa rivers, transited the pass over the Babine Range, and descended to Babine Lake.

== Earlier communities ==
Since gambling distracted the indigenous people from engaging in hunting, the HBC endeavoured to discourage this practice from the 1820s to 1890.

A 1906 observation noted the importance to this indigenous village of salmon catches, which were both the chief staple and barter commodity. A pile bridge spanned the river to the village on the northeast side, which comprised 30 log houses and a Roman Catholic (RC) church. Sited southeast of the reserve, an HBC post supplied Fort St. James on Stuart Lake, McLeod Lake, and Fort Grahame. The post comprised a store, warehouse, residence, and several log cabins to accommodate travellers in summer and miners in winter. A trail northeast led to Takla Lake.

The RC church administered a day school 1913–1959. New church buildings were erected at Fort Babine and Old Fort in 1915 and 1925 respectively.

== Maps ==
- New Caledonia map. 1904.
- "Standard Oil BC map". www.davidrumsey.com. 1937.
- "Shell BC map". www.davidrumsey.com. 1956.
- Former HBC forts in the area. 2011.
- Babine reserves in the area. 2015.

== Later communities ==
In 1957, the Department of Indian Affairs did not consult band members when administratively merging the Old Fort Band and Fort Babine Band, which formed what is now known as the Lake Babine Nation (LBN).

=== Fort Babine ===
Census population: Fort Babine (Babine 6)
Year	Pop.	±%
1986	80	—
1991	126	+57.5%
1996	128	+1.6%
2001	77	−39.8%
2006	78	+1.3%
2011	93	+19.2%
2016*	81	−12.9%
2021	75	−7.4%
Source: * Revised figure

The Fort Babine Indian Reserve #6 is a small community inhabited year round. The traditional name is "Wit'at," which is an abbreviated form of "Wit'ane Keh," meaning "place of making dry fish" in the Nadut'en language. Many LBN members visit over the summer months to obtain their annual salmon supply, which is cured in family smokehouses.

The post office operated 1950–1983.

Constructed in the 1970s, the narrow Nilkitkwa forestry service road provides the only vehicle access. That decade, the HBC store closed.

In 1999, the new elementary school opened. Transmission lines were installed by BC Hydro in the 1980s and by Telus in 2006. That year, a water treatment plant was completed.

The UNBC began archaeological excavations in 2010. The hundreds of artifacts uncovered, which date to over a thousand years ago, indicate the longevity and continued presence of the community.

In 2014, the province gave the LBN the existing Fort Babine Lodge, $100,000, and additional land to develop tourism.

Unemployment is high, but a 2015 community survey found social development (29%) as the perceived key need. This encompassed a desire for more people living in the community and improved educational opportunities and support services. Governance (21%) was also identified, indicating a strong desire to be separate from Woyenne resolutions.

=== Old Fort ===
The Old Fort Indian Reserve #13 is inhabited mostly during summer and fall. The traditional name is Nedo'ats. Families return to fish and hunt at this important site, which is accessible only by boat.

The survey found infrastructure (31%) as the paramount need. The erection of cabins, a community centre, and shower/bathhouses, would facilitate visitors and enable permanent residence.
