= Babine Lake =

Natural lake in British Columbia, Canada

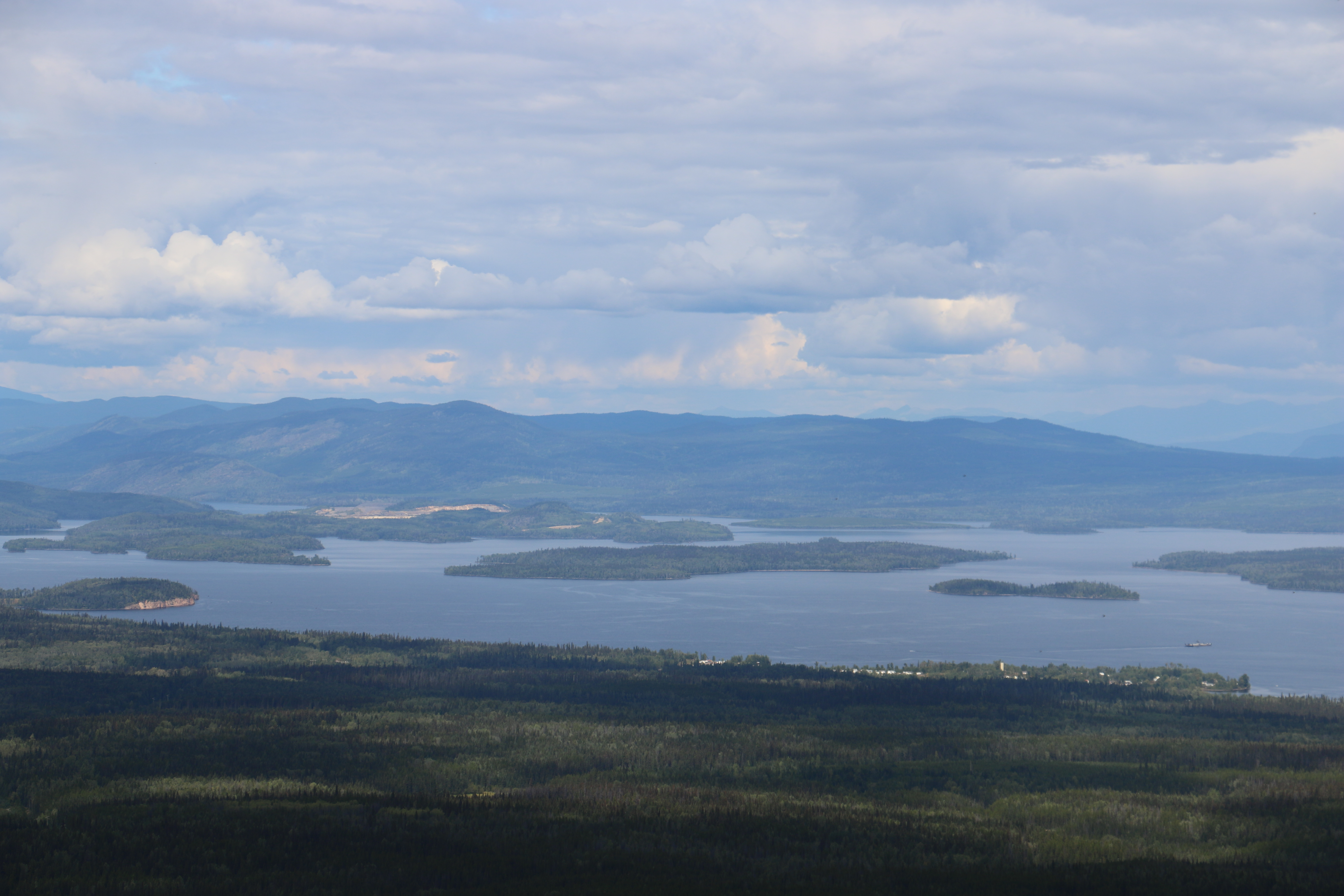

- Location within British Columbia
- Location: Skeena/Omineca; British Columbia, Canada
- Group: Nechako Lakes
- Coordinates: 54°46′34″N 126°00′50″W
- Primary outflows: Babine River
- Basin countries: Canada
- Max. length: 153 km (95 mi)
- Max. width: 10 km (6.2 mi)
- Surface area: 479 km^{2} (185 mi^{2})
- Average depth: 55 m (180 ft)
- Max. depth: 186 m (610 ft)
- Surface elevation: 711 m (2,333 ft)
- Islands: 16 km^{2} (6 mi^{2})

Babine Lake borders the Skeena and Omineca regions of central British Columbia, Canada. Vehicle access to the lake, via BC Highway 16 and Nilkitkwa forestry service road, is by road about 105 kilometres (65 mi) northeast of Smithers; via BC Highway 16 and Central Babine Lake Highway, is about 132 kilometres (82 mi) east of Smithers; or via Babine Lake Road, is about 20 kilometres (12 mi) northeast of Burns Lake.

== Name origin ==
In 1812, fur traders James McDougall and Daniel Harmon of the North West Company (NWC) Fort St. James post travelled over the ice to what became known as "McDougall's Lake". The men were likely the first Europeans to explore the Skeena River system.

On observing that the women of the "Nata" tribe inserted an object between their teeth and lower lip that stretched the lip, a NWC employee called the tribe "Babine". At the time, the French word babine also meant a large lower lip like that of a cow or horse. The earliest known recorded mention of the name Babine's Lake is 1853 and Babine Lake is 1858. Trutch's 1871 map adopted this name. The lake was called Kit-koin by the Tsimshian and Na-taw-bun-kut ("long lake") by the Dakelh, now spelled Nado Bun.

== Lake profile ==
The lake is the second largest and the longest of the natural lakes within BC. The length is 153 kilometres (95 mi) and the width 2 to 10 kilometres (1 to 6 mi). The surface area of 479 square kilometres (185 mi^{2}), plus 16 square kilometres (6 mi^{2}) of islands, covers 495 square kilometres (191 mi^{2}). The elevation is 711 metres (2,333 ft) above sea level.

The lake contains high levels of organic matter but low levels of nutrients, suspended solids, and trace metals. The mean depth is 55 metres (180 ft) and maximum depth is 186 metres (610 ft), though depth in much of the lake is in the 10 to 20 metres (33 to 66 ft) range.

By regions, the mean depth of the Main Arm is 68 metres (223 ft), the North Arm 18.7 metres (61 ft), and the Morrison Arm 11.4 metres (37 ft), causing the latter two to be ice covered six weeks longer than the main lake.

The lake has 37 significant tributaries, of which the Sutherland River, Pinkut Creek, Fulton Creek, Morrison Creek, and Shass Creek, are considered major.

The lake drains northwestward into the Babine River, an important tributary of the Skeena.

== Fisheries ==
The Babine River is the main sockeye salmon tributary of the Skeena. From the 1820s, the Hudson's Bay Company (HBC) procured large quantities of salmon from the Babines, who installed fishing weirs across this river and some of the lake tributaries. In 1825, the HBC acquired 44,000 salmon, which were transported over the Babine Portage to Fort St. James. Although the Babines consumed far more salmon than the HBC, both groups were dependent upon this staple. In 1826, the HBC developed a fisheries strategy.

As the canneries became established at the mouth of the Skeena increasing pressure on the government to stop the long established weir system at Nass Glee near present-day Wit"at(Fort Babine) resulted in the Barricade Treaty of 1906. Each season the Lake Babine Nation (LBN) set up weirs in accordance with the dictates of their annual Bal'Hat. This was centred around the annual sockeye fishery. It was a food staple as well and a much sought after trading commodity. Babine Lake is part of the long-standing 'Grease Trail', a major trade route connecting coastal nations with the BC Interior. By this time, the HBC demand had reduced to 10,000–15,000 salmon annually.

When the government failed to supply fishing nets, the Babines rebuilt their fishing weirs and resisted attempts by federal fishery officers to destroy them. The delivery of nets in 1906 ended the conflict. In 1907, a fish hatchery was built directly behind Old Fort. In 1908, the BC Fishery Commission recommended that the sale of native-caught salmon be prohibited. In 1917, the purchase of such fish became illegal.

Fulton River Spawning Channel is managed by DFO and is an enhanced area of the Fulton River regulated in a number of ways to increase survival of the fry. It has been in operation since 1965 and has improved the sockeye runs long term stability. Stats are available on DFO webpage.

In 1983, a salmon hatchery, which was re-established adjacent to Fort Babine, was successful in rebuilding Babine coho stocks, followed by chinook stocks. Since 2010, habitat monitoring has been the project focus.

Fishing weirs have been reintroduced but are now used responsibly. Many Lake Babine Nation (LBN) members visit Fort Babine over the summer months to obtain their annual salmon supply, which is cured in family smokehouses.

== Ferries and HBC watercraft ==
HBC watercraft connected to the Babine Portage (details in article).

Although a ferry likely existed over the North Arm during the Omineca Gold Rush, one definitely operated for miners during the 1890s.

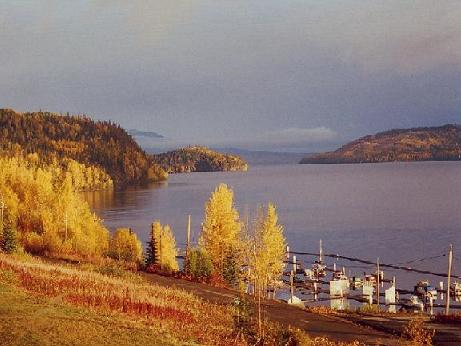
Babine Lake, near Granisle, 2005.

The 1914 tender advertisement for a government ferry charter was probably across the North Arm.

In 1965, the road was extended 10 kilometres (6 mi) from Topley Landing to Granisle, where a private ferry crossed the lake to carry construction material for the Granisle Copper mine on the east shore. Compressed air released from lower levels to the surface prevented the ferry channel from freezing during winter. The ferry carried ore concentrates when mine production began in 1966.

From 1969, a Granisle ferry transported logging trucks across the lake.

In 1993, the ferry Babine Charger was launched. On the 40-minute crossing, the ferry can carry eight to nine logging trucks for Canadian Forests Products. The ferry runs from Michelle Bay (near Topley Landing) to Nose Bay.

== Shoreline ==
Shoreline locations include:

- Babine Lake Marine Provincial Park
- Topley Landing Provincial Park
- Red Bluff Provincial Park
- Lake Babine Nation reserves of Fort Babine, Old Fort, Tachet, and Donald's Landing/Pinkut Creek.
- Babine Portage
- Granisle
- Topley Landing

== Maps ==
- BC map. 1882.
- "Standard Oil BC map". www.davidrumsey.com. 1937.
- "Shell BC map". www.davidrumsey.com. 1956.
- Babine Lake map. 2008.

== Climate ==
Climate data for Babine Lake
Month	Jan	Feb	Mar	Apr	May	Jun	Jul	Aug	Sep	Oct	Nov	Dec	Year
Record high °C (°F)	10.5 (50.9)	12.0 (53.6)	15.5 (59.9)	20.5 (68.9)	30.0 (86.0)	33.3 (91.9)	33.9 (93.0)	32.0 (89.6)	30.0 (86.0)	21.5 (70.7)	14.5 (58.1)	12.0 (53.6)	33.9 (93.0)
Mean daily maximum °C (°F)	−4.1 (24.6)	−1.7 (28.9)	3.1 (37.6)	8.5 (47.3)	13.7 (56.7)	17.4 (63.3)	20.0 (68.0)	19.8 (67.6)	15.1 (59.2)	8.2 (46.8)	1.1 (34.0)	−2.5 (27.5)	8.2 (46.8)
Daily mean °C (°F)	−7.3 (18.9)	−5.6 (21.9)	−1.6 (29.1)	3.4 (38.1)	8.1 (46.6)	12.3 (54.1)	14.7 (58.5)	14.4 (57.9)	10.1 (50.2)	4.5 (40.1)	−1.8 (28.8)	−5.4 (22.3)	3.8 (38.8)
Mean daily minimum °C (°F)	−10.5 (13.1)	−9.5 (14.9)	−6.2 (20.8)	−1.7 (28.9)	2.6 (36.7)	7.0 (44.6)	9.4 (48.9)	8.8 (47.8)	5.1 (41.2)	0.7 (33.3)	−4.6 (23.7)	−8.3 (17.1)	−0.6 (30.9)
Record low °C (°F)	−44.4 (−47.9)	−38.3 (−36.9)	−33.3 (−27.9)	−22.0 (−7.6)	−5.6 (21.9)	−2.2 (28.0)	0.0 (32.0)	−1.7 (28.9)	−5.0 (23.0)	−20.0 (−4.0)	−31.5 (−24.7)	−36.7 (−34.1)	−44.4 (−47.9)
Average precipitation mm (inches)	44.0 (1.73)	28.5 (1.12)	25.4 (1.00)	25.2 (0.99)	37.7 (1.48)	53.0 (2.09)	43.7 (1.72)	39.8 (1.57)	40.4 (1.59)	47.9 (1.89)	44.3 (1.74)	40.9 (1.61)	470.8 (18.54)
Average rainfall mm (inches)	4.9 (0.19)	3.0 (0.12)	5.8 (0.23)	18.7 (0.74)	37.1 (1.46)	53.0 (2.09)	43.7 (1.72)	39.8 (1.57)	40.4 (1.59)	40.7 (1.60)	16.0 (0.63)	4.5 (0.18)	307.5 (12.11)
Average snowfall cm (inches)	39.0 (15.4)	25.5 (10.0)	19.6 (7.7)	6.6 (2.6)	0.6 (0.2)	0.0 (0.0)	0.0 (0.0)	0.0 (0.0)	0.0 (0.0)	7.2 (2.8)	28.3 (11.1)	36.5 (14.4)	163.3 (64.3)
Average precipitation days (≥ 0.2 mm)	12.9	8.4	9.1	9.8	12.8	13.7	12.5	11.7	12.9	15.8	12.9	11.5	144.0
Average rainy days (≥ 0.2 mm)	1.7	1.6	3.5	8.2	12.6	13.7	12.5	11.7	12.9	14.7	6.1	1.8	101.1
Average snowy days (≥ 0.2 cm)	11.4	6.9	6.0	2.2	0.2	0.0	0.0	0.0	0.0	1.5	7.4	10.1	45.8
Mean monthly sunshine hours	40.4	84.6	142.5	191.1	242.2	247.2	277.3	245.4	178.8	106.0	45.0	27.3	1,827.7
Percentage possible sunshine	16.4	30.9	38.9	45.4	48.8	48.1	53.8	53.1	46.7	32.4	17.6	11.9	37.0

== See also ==
- List of lakes of British Columbia
