= Capilano Mountain =

Mountain in British Columbia, Canada

- Location within Greater Vancouver Regional District Location within Squamish-Lillooet Regional District Location within British Columbia

Highest point
- Elevation: 1,692 m (5,551 ft)
- Prominence: 603 m (1,978 ft)
- Parent peak: Cathedral Mountain
- Listing: Mountains of British Columbia
- Coordinates: 49°33′23″N 123°08′09″W

Geography
- Country: Canada
- Province: British Columbia
- Region: Squamish-Lillooet Regional District
- District: New Westminster Land District
- Parent range: Britannia Range
- Topo map: NTS 92G11 Squamish

Climbing
- First ascent: 1920

Capilano Mountain, 1,692 metres (5,551 ft), is a summit in the Britannia Range, a subrange of the Coast Mountains of British Columbia, Canada. The mountain is located just east of the village of Furry Creek on the Howe Sound shoreline below. Capilano Mountain is one of the northernmost peaks that can be seen from downtown Vancouver and is therefore often considered to be one of the northernmost North Shore Mountains. It is the headwaters of the Capilano River in the Capilano Watershed, which flows south through to Capilano Lake and the North Shore of the Burrard Inlet. Its north aspect drains into the Howe Sound via Furry and Downing creeks.

Capilano Mountain is typically ascended via the Beth Lake Trail, accessed by Furry Downing Road from the village of Furry Creek.

== Name origin ==
Capilano Mountain was named after Squamish Chief Kiapalano, the father of Chief Joe Capilano. Capilano was first used to describe the Capilano River in 1867 and Capilano Mountain in 1912. The name was officially adopted in 1924.

== See also ==
- Mount Hanover
- Mount Brunswick
