= Mount Burwell =

Mountain in British Columbia, Canada

- White Mountain
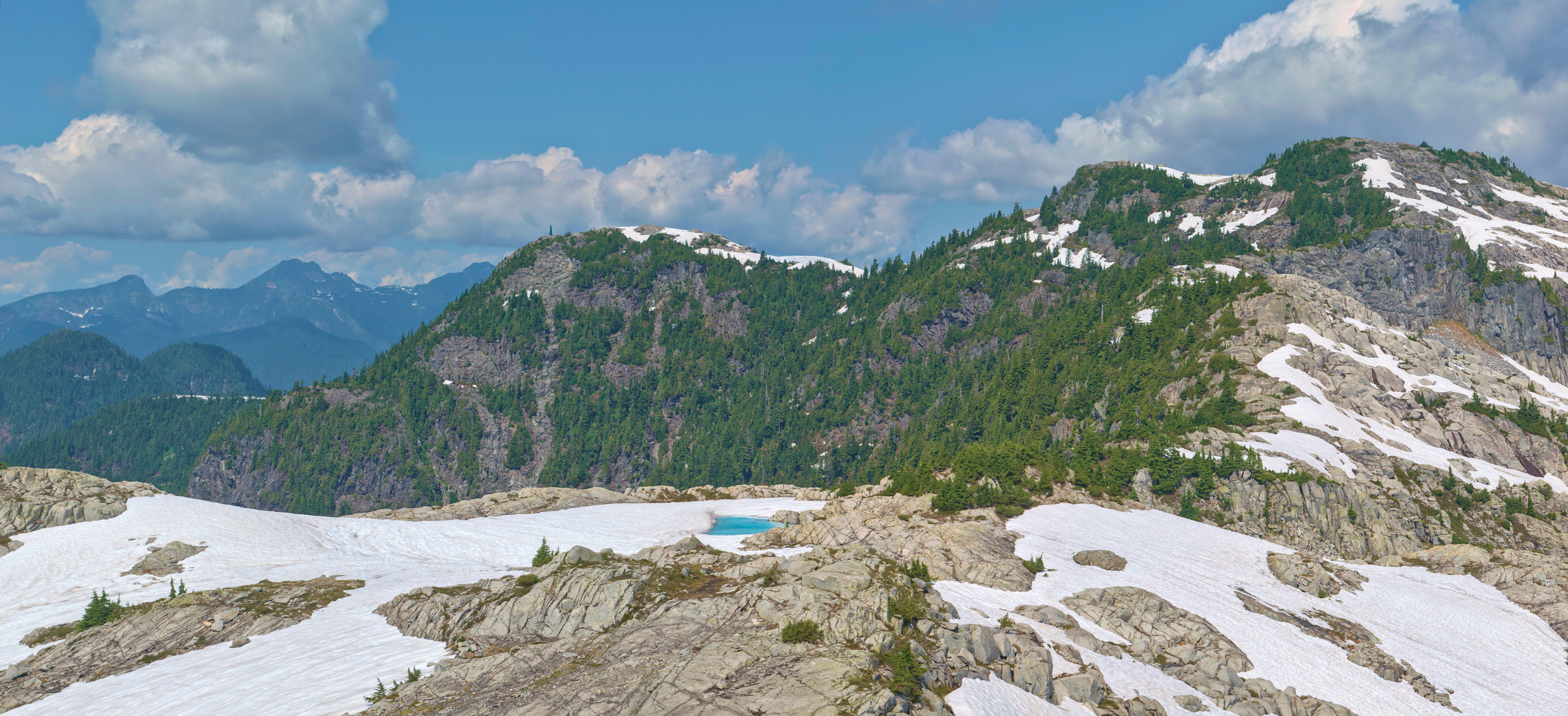
- Mount Burwell as seen from Coliseum Mountain

Highest point
- Elevation: 1,541 m (5,056 ft)
- Prominence: 369 m (1,211 ft)
- Parent peak: Cathedral Mountain
- Isolation: 2.4 km (1.5 mi)
- Listing: Mountains of British Columbia
- Coordinates: 49°26′33″N 123°00′55″W

Geography
- Location within Greater Vancouver Regional District Location within British Columbia Location within Canada
- Interactive map of Mount Burwell
- Country: Canada
- Province: British Columbia
- Districts: New Westminster Land District; Metro Vancouver Regional District
- Parent range: North Shore Mountains; Coast Mountains
- Topo map: NTS 92G6 North Vancouver

Climbing
- First ascent: 1908

Mount Burwell is a 1,541-metre (5,056 ft) mountain summit in the Metro Vancouver Regional District of British Columbia, Canada. It is part of the North Shore Mountains, which are a small subrange of the Pacific Ranges of the Coast Mountains.

== Name origin ==
Mount Burwell had its first recorded ascent in 1908 by a British Columbia Mountaineering Club party who called it 'White Mountain' due to its bare, white granite top. It was officially named Mount Burwell in 1927, after Herbert Mahlon Burwell (1862–1925), a surveyor and consulting engineer for major waterworks projects for the City of Vancouver. However, the name 'White Mountain' was commonly used until the 1950s.

== Access ==
Mount Burwell is accessible from hiking trails from Lynn Headwaters Regional Park and Lower Seymour Conservation Reserve which lead up to Coliseum Mountain (1,441 metres; 4,728 ft), a granitic subpeak of Mount Burwell named for its resemblance to Roman ruins. From Coliseum Mountain, climbers can use a scrambling route to summit Mount Burwell. The northern slopes of Mount Burwell, including Palisade Lake, Burwell Lake, and ridge between line parent Cathedral Mountain, fall within the Seymour and Capilano Watersheds and are closed to the public.

== See also ==
- Crown Mountain
- The Lions (peaks)
- Brunswick Mountain
