= Mount Fromme =

Mountain in British Columbia (province), Canada

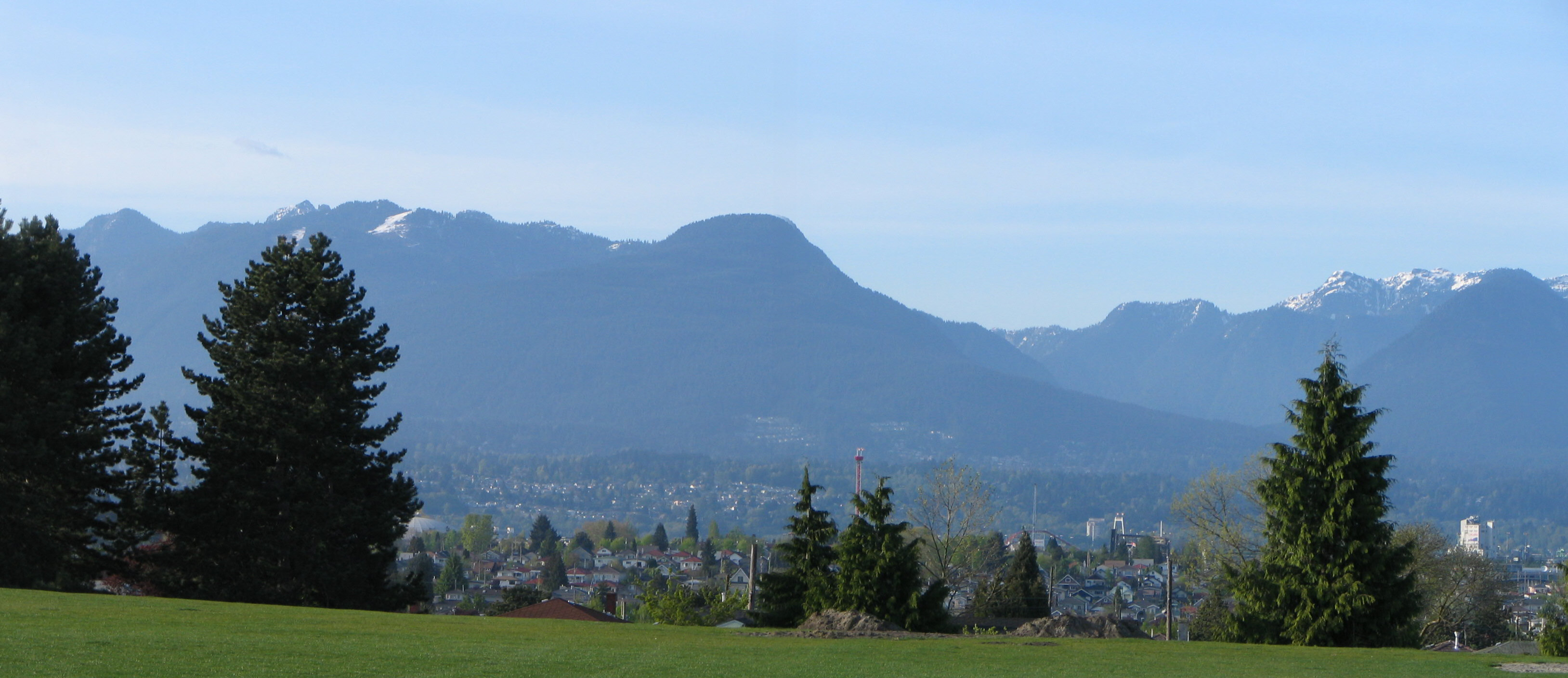
- Mount Fromme from Sunrise Park in East Vancouver

Highest point
- Elevation: 1,185 m (3,888 ft)
- Prominence: 235 m (771 ft)
- Parent peak: Grouse Mountain (1231 m)
- Listing: Mountains of British Columbia
- Coordinates: 49°23′00″N 123°03′23″W

Geography
- Location within British Columbia
- Interactive map of Mount Fromme
- Location: British Columbia, Canada
- District: New Westminster Land District
- Parent range: North Shore Mountains
- Topo map: NTS 92G6 North Vancouver

Climbing
- Easiest route: Mt. Highway & Bill's Trail (T2 Mountain Hiking)

Mount Fromme is one of the North Shore Mountains that overlook Burrard Inlet north of Vancouver, British Columbia. It stands just east of Grouse Mountain, and the District of North Vancouver and the City of North Vancouver lie on its lower slopes, where it descends to the inlet. Mount Fromme, like the other mountains of the Pacific Ranges, is covered with temperate rainforest of the Coastal Western Hemlock Zone. In the case of Mount Fromme, this is largely secondary growth forest, since the mountain was extensively logged in the early 20th century. Outside of the Vancouver area Mount Fromme is known as a mountain biking destination.

== Origin of the name ==
Mount Fromme is named after J. M. Fromme (ca. 1858-1941), the "Father of Lynn Valley," a lumber camp foreman who built the first house in Lynn Valley, which drains the eastern slope of the mountain. This name, first proposed in 1928 when Fromme was reeve of the District of North Vancouver, became official on December 7, 1937. Prior to that, the mountain had been known as The Dome and, still earlier, as Timber Mountain.

== Mountain biking ==
Mount Fromme features various trails, many of which are part of the NSMBA (North Shore Mountain Biking Association). Some of these trails are sponsored by companies which provide money to maintain the trails. Mount Fromme features green, blue, black, and double black trails.

Mt. Fromme is a popular destination for many bikers during the summer. The trails are accessed via Mountain Highway, though bikers have to ride up as the gravel path is restricted to vehicle access with special privileges above 360 metres elevation. Mountain Highway eventually leads to Grouse Mountain. The easier trails are usually located at the bottom of the hill while the advanced ones are further up. The majority of the trails are located below the seventh switchback.

From the lowest trail at 280 m to the highest trail at 780 m, the Mount Fromme Mountain Biking area covers 600 metres vertical.

=== Notable trails ===
There are approximately 40 mountain biking trails in total though many of them have become not ride-able due to lack of maintenance. Companies can sponsor trails to maintain them.

Bobsled

Bobsled is the most popular trail on Mount Fromme. It is past the first switchback a little further than Floppy Bunny. The trail is a very fast, smooth trail resembling a pump track that contains a lot of berms, bumps, and jumps. There are several ladder bridges and drops. The trail is rated a green/blue. The run is a green if none of the features are attempted but a blue if they are.

Baden-Powell Trail

Though it is mainly a hiking trail, many mountain bike trails end at various points along the Baden Powell which bikers use to get back to Mountain Highway. It contains ladder bridges and several technical rock features. The Baden Powell is rated a black trail.

38DD

38DD is a very advanced trail which is situated between the third and fourth switchback. It is most notable for the giant drop at the opening of the trail which launches off from a massive boulder. There is an alternate entrance that starts higher up on Mountain Highway. It was rated as the now unused triple red diamond trail (the hardest difficulty) but is now decommissioned and is in disrepair.

Air Supply/Jerry Rig

Air Supply is a trail located on the sixth switchback after Oil Can. It is currently decommissioned and all the jumps which used to be on it are now destroyed. It used to contain massive jumps and drops, some of which still exist but are unsafe to ride. Air Supply branches onto the trail Jerry Rig (which is sometimes called Lower Air Supply). Jerry Rig officially starts further up Mountain Highway. It contains massive ladder bridges, many of which are over 10 feet in the air and under six inches thick, giant jumps and wall-rides, almost all of which are in disrepair and unsafe to ride. Both trails are triple red diamonds and deposit onto the Baden-Powell Trail.

The Flying Circus

The Flying Circus is a triple red diamond run constructed by North Shore biker "Dangerous Dan". It starts just below Upper Oil Can and is known for the extremely challenging skinnies and ladder-bridges which are very thin and high in the air. Some of the skinnies require the rider to do a bunny hop to maneuver around the corners.

The Flying Circus is now decommissioned.

Floppy Bunny

Floppy Bunny is a popular trail found before Bobsled on the climb up. It is a black diamond but can be ridden as a blue if none of the optional features are attempted. It contains an optional jump line but several mandatory wood features.

== Hiking ==
View from the summit of Mount Fromme

Mount Fromme also contains a few hiking trails. Some trails are shared biking and hiking trails. Some hiking-only trails include St. Georges which connects the Baden Powell Trail with Mountain Highway just before the seventh switchback, and Per Gynt which connects the seventh switchback to past the eighth. There are three major trails to the summit of Mount Fromme. These are, in order of difficulty from easiest to most difficult, Bill's Trail, Wally's Trail, and Doug's Trail. All three wind through second growth forest, gaining a final 350 meters of elevation above Mountain Highway (which continues on to Grouse Mountain). Bill's Trail approaches from the south after the end of the Per Gynt trail. Wally's trail approaches the summit from the southwest. Doug's trail approaches from the north from the Mosquito Creek headwaters. From the pass between Fromme and Grouse, north of the summit at an elevation of 950 metres above sea level, one may use Erik the Red trail to proceed to Grouse Mountain and Goat Mountain. The summit offers views of Cathedral Mountain, Mount Burwell, Mount Coliseum, Fannin Range, The Needles, Lynn Peak, Mount Seymour, and Mount Baker. The summit typically sees snowpack until mid to late June.
