= Lynn Valley =

Neighbourhood in North Vancouver, British Columbia, Canada

Coordinates: 49.3371°N 123.0384°W

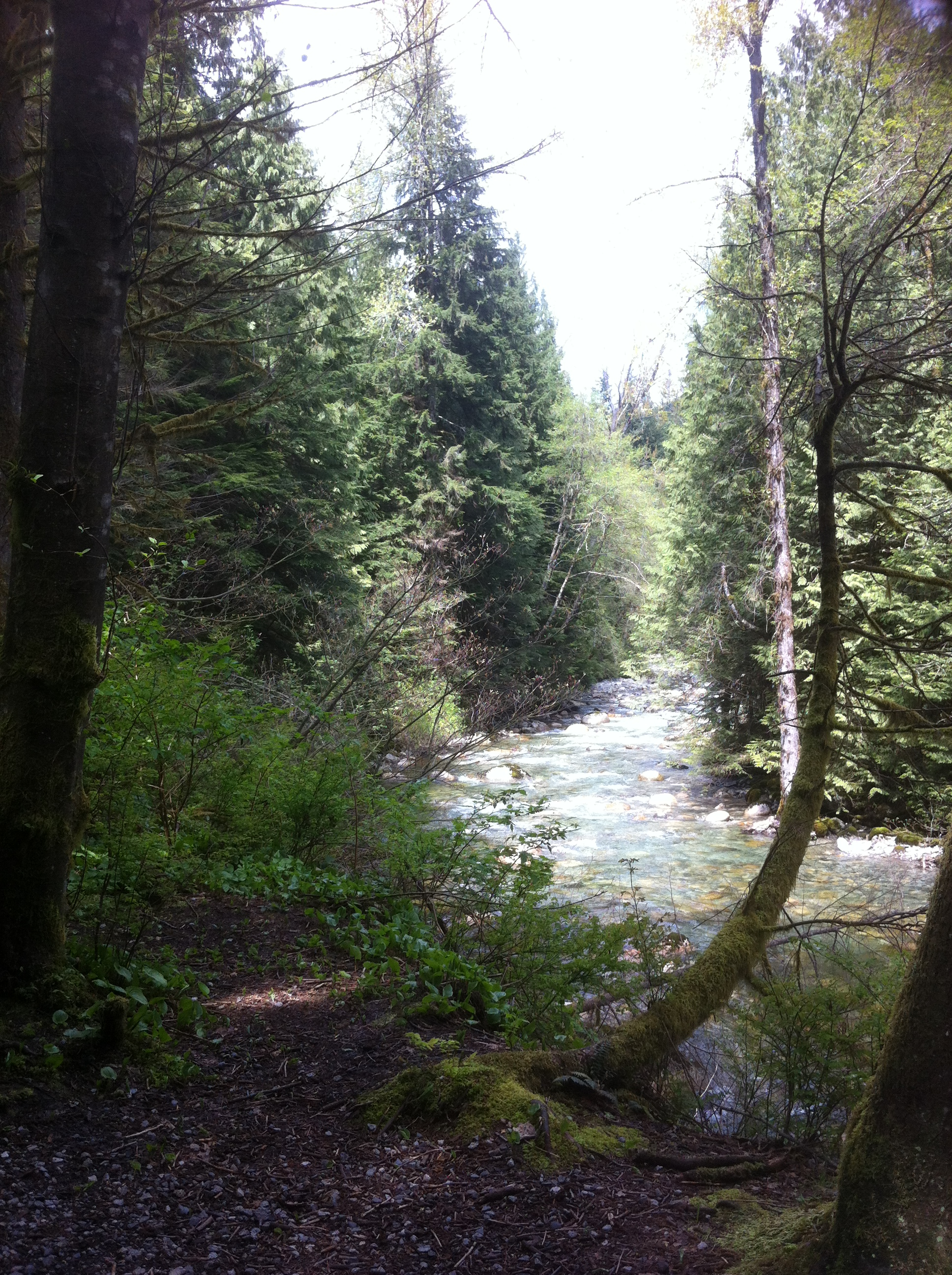
Lynn Valley May 2012

Lynn Valley is a neighbourhood in the District of North Vancouver, British Columbia, Canada. Located at the northern edge of Metro Vancouver, it sits between Mount Fromme and Mount Seymour. The area's natural parks include Lynn Headwaters Regional Park, the Lower Seymour Conservation Reserve (formerly known as the "Seymour Demonstration Forest") and Lynn Canyon Park, whose main attraction is the Lynn Canyon Suspension Bridge. Lynn Valley is named after British Royal Engineer John Linn, who settled in the area after 1869. The main intersection of Lynn Valley Road and Mountain Highway is the location of the Main Library and Town Centre. The area is now known as Lynn Valley Village.

== Natural features ==
Lynn Valley is known as a mountain biking, hiking destination, and for easy access to ski hill. The forest area in and around Lynn Valley is often used as a filming location.

Lynn Canyon Park contains approximately 250 hectares (620 acres) of land area, which some have characterized as relatively "unspoilt". Lynn Canyon Park is home to the spectacular second-growth rainforest and offers a range of hiking trails for all abilities. The Lynn Valley Tree, one of the tallest known specimen of Douglas fir, was once located in the valley.

== Geography ==
Lynn Valley is bounded by the Upper Lonsdale to the west, Lower Lynn to the south, Lynn Creek to the east, and the North Shore Mountains to the north.

== Poet's Corner ==
A niche of Lynn Valley is Poet's Corner, a series of street names of past poets. These include Shakespeare, Tennyson, William, Chaucer, and Milton as well as many others that weave around the outskirts of Hunter's or Kirkstone Park.

== History ==
Previously known as "Shaketown", the rugged beginnings of Lynn Valley consisted of shake-sided shakes to accommodate lumberjacks, cooks, blacksmiths, and millwrights who used the lumber during the turn of the 19th century. The skid road built straight down the middle called Tote Road, used for oxen to haul felled logs to the Moodyville waterfront, was bisected by "Centre Road" (now Mountain Highway), and Pipeline Road, a simple plank road along which a pipeline was installed to carry drinking water from Rice Lake to North Vancouver, which is now called Lynn Valley Road.

== Lynn Valley Town Centre ==
Lynn Valley has a Town Centre, designed by architect Gregory Henriquez. It is also home to the Lynn Valley branch of the North Vancouver District Public Library.

== Argyle Secondary School ==
The primary secondary school in Lynn Valley is Argyle Secondary School (built in 1960), part of School District 44 North Vancouver. Construction for the new school began in the summer of 2018 and was completed in January 2021. The new school can now accommodate up to 1300 students to cater to the expanding neighbourhoods.

== Transportation ==
The neighbourhood is served by various TransLink buses. Bus 210 directly links the neighbourhood to Downtown Vancouver.
