= North Shore Mountains =

Mountain range in British Columbia, Canada

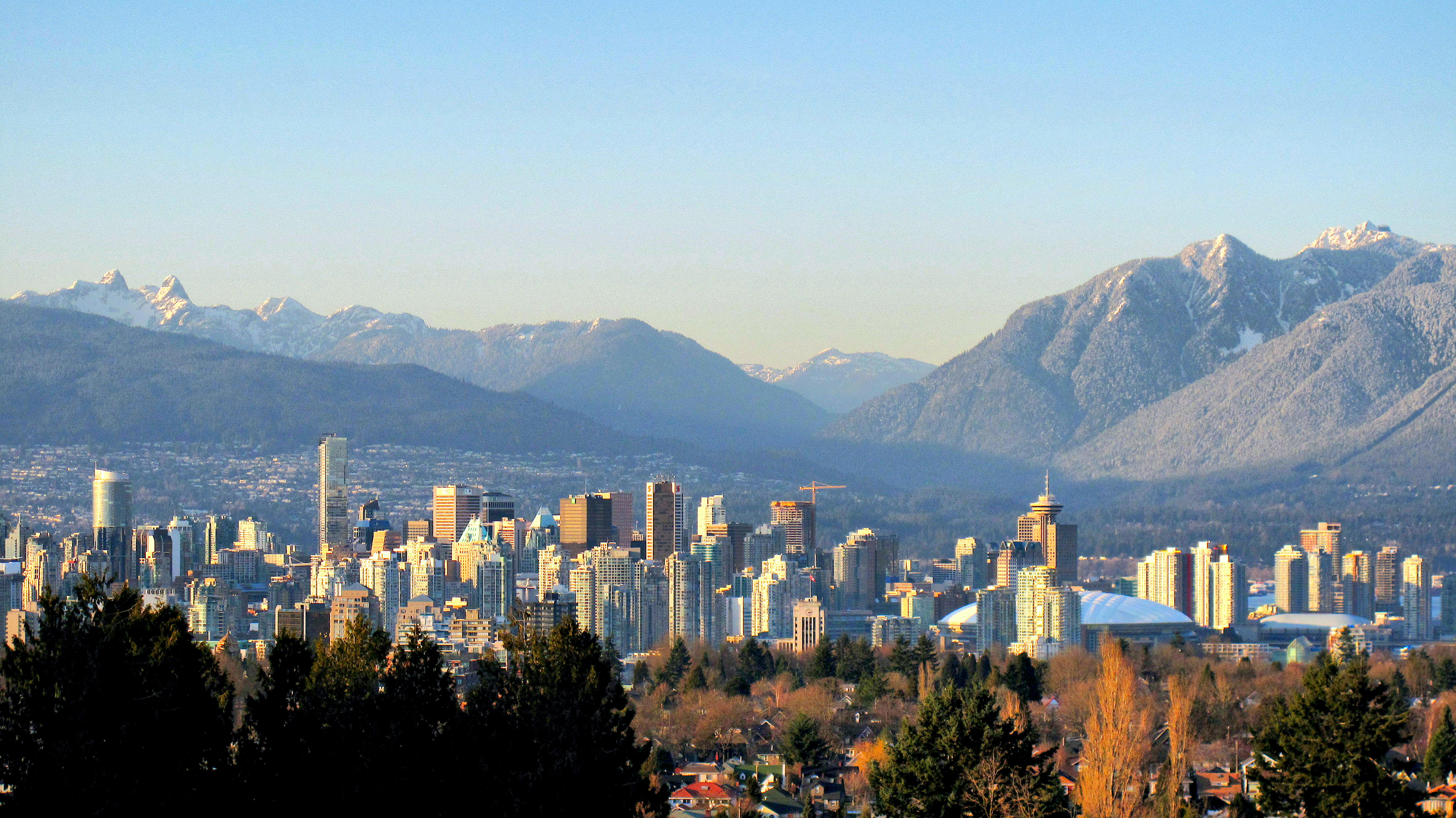
- North Shore Mountains from Queen Elizabeth Park in Vancouver

Highest point
- Peak: Brunswick Mountain or Sky Pilot Mountain
- Elevation: 1,788 or 2,031 m (5,866 or 6,663 ft)
- Parent peak: Pacific Ranges
- Coordinates: 49.407°N 123.211°W

Geography
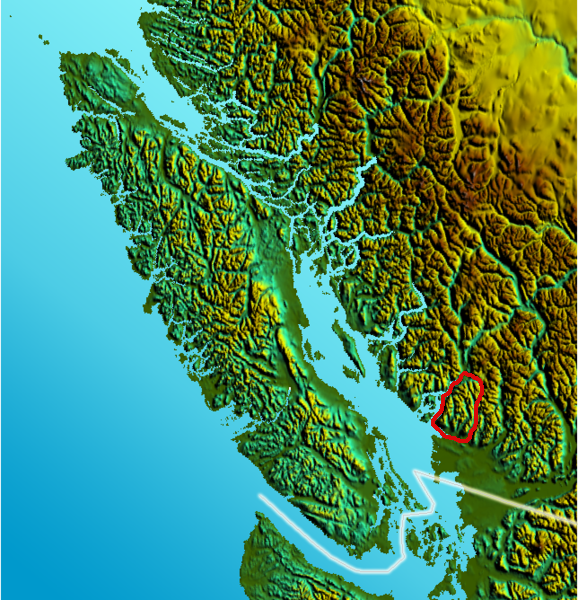
- Location of the North Shore Mountains
- Country: Canada
- Province: British Columbia

The North Shore Mountains are a mountain range overlooking Vancouver in British Columbia, Canada. Their southernmost peaks are visible from most areas in Vancouver and form a distinctive backdrop for the city.

The steep southern slopes of the North Shore Mountains limit the extent to which the municipalities of Metro Vancouver's North Shore (West Vancouver, the District of North Vancouver, the City of North Vancouver and the Village of Lions Bay) can grow. In many places on the North Shore, residential neighbourhoods abruptly end and rugged forested slopes begin. These forested slopes are crisscrossed by a large network of trails including the Baden-Powell Trail, the Howe Sound Crest Trail, the Binkert/Lions Trail and a wide variety of mountain biking trails.

The North Shore Mountains are a small subrange of the Pacific Ranges, the southernmost grouping of the vast Coast Mountains. They are bounded on the south by Burrard Inlet, on the west and north-west by Howe Sound, and on the north and north-east by the Garibaldi Ranges. To the east the bounds are defined by Indian Arm (a branch of Burrard Inlet). The ridge running north from Mount Seymour has its own name, the Fannin Range, while much of the Howe Sound-flanking portion of it is known as the Britannia Range. There is debate whether the Britannia Range is part of the North Shore Mountains as there are no official boundaries of the North Shore Mountains.

Although not particularly high, these mountains are rugged and should not be underestimated. Severe weather conditions in the North Shore Mountains often contrast dramatically with mild conditions in nearby Vancouver. This is especially true in winter, but even in summer, large precipices are hidden very close to popular hiking trails and it is very easy to get lost, despite being in sight of the city. Those who venture into the North Shore Mountains for whatever reason should be well prepared at any time of year.

Three deep river valleys divide the North Shore Mountains. These are, in order from west to east:

- Capilano River valley
- Lynn Headwaters
  - Lynn Valley
  - Lynn Canyon - known for Lynn Canyon Suspension bridge
- Seymour River valley

The Capilano and Seymour rivers emanate from the massive Metro Vancouver watershed area administered by Metro Vancouver. The watershed extends deep into the North Shore Mountains region, but is strictly off-limits to all unauthorized human activities. The Lynn Headwaters, a deep cirque valley drained by Lynn Creek, is a very popular regional park administered by Metro Vancouver.

There are two provincial parks in the area, Cypress Provincial Park and Mount Seymour Provincial Park. Both feature reliable road access, downhill ski areas, and extensive trail networks. Nearby Grouse Mountain features a downhill ski area and tourist attractions which are accessible by the Skyride, an aerial tramway. A very popular hiking trail, the Grouse Grind, climbs up the steep flanks of Grouse Mountain from the tramway parking lot. Before the Grouse Mountain Skyride was built, a chairlift operated from Skyline Drive at the head of North Vancouver's Lonsdale Avenue, and the ski area itself could be accessed via Mountain Highway, which now has a gate at its upper end in the Lynn Valley neighbourhood.

In the Seymour River valley, the Lower Seymour Conservation Reserve features over 100 km of trails including a paved bicycle path called the Seymour Valley Trailway that winds into the mountains for 10 km to Seymour Lake. It is frequently used for recreation, and occasionally for TV and film productions such as Stargate SG-1.

== Mountains ==
A view of the North Shore Mountains as seen looking west from the Mount Seymour alpine area in March. The sharp-pointed peak near the upper right is Crown Mountain.

There are dozens of individual mountains in the North Shore Mountains. The list below is incomplete.

=== Howe Sound Crest / Lions area ===
Rising above the eastern shore of the Howe Sound, the crests of the mountains are protected by Cypress Provincial Park and are accessed by the 29 km Howe Sound Crest Trail.

- Brunswick Mountain (1,788 m; 5,866 ft) – The highest peak along the Howe Sound Crest and often considered the highest peak in the North Shore Mountains, located just above Brunswick Beach in Lions Bay.
- Mount Hanover (1,748 m; 5,735 ft) – The second highest peak along the Howe Sound Crest.
- The Lions (1,654 m; 5,427 ft) – Possibly the most famous peaks in the North Shore Mountains. These mountains, a pair of twin granite domes, are visually distinctive and can be seen from much of the Metro Vancouver area.
- Mount Harvey (1,652 m; 5,420 ft) – An isolated alpine peak located near the Lions.

=== Cypress group ===
The southwestern tip of the North Shore mountains that are visible from Vancouver and a popular destination for recreation. It is the namesake of Cypress Provincial Park.

- Black Mountain (1,217 m; 3,993 ft) – A flat-topped, forested summit overlooking Horseshoe Bay. Ski runs on the northern slopes are managed by Cypress Mountain Resort.
- Hollyburn Mountain (1,325 m; 4,347 ft) – A popular hiking destination. Commonly known as Hollyburn Ridge and the location of an old alpine recreation community dating back to the early years of the 20th Century. It is the site of the only groomed cross-country ski trails in the Lower Mainland.
- Mount Strachan (1,454 m; 4,770 ft) – Ski runs on the southern slopes are managed by Cypress Mountain Resort.

=== Grouse area ===
Located centrally in the range between Capilano Valley and Lynn Valley, its peaks are highly visible throughout Metro Vancouver.

- Mount Fromme (1,185 m; 3,888 ft) – A large forested summit dome. This mountain is noted for the mountain biking trails on its south slopes.
- Grouse Mountain (1,231 m; 4,039 ft) – Site of the very popular Grouse Mountain ski area, and the popular hiking trail Grouse Grind. It can be accessed by gondola.
- Dam Mountain (1,349 m; 4,426 ft) – Located directly west of Grouse Mountain with the hike from the Grouse lodge referred to as the "Snowshoe Grind" in the winter.
- Goat Mountain (1,401 m; 4,596 ft) – Another popular alpine hiking destination, along with its neighbour Goat Ridge Peak (1,269 m; 4,163 ft).
- Crown Mountain (1,504 m; 4,934 ft) – An exposed granite pyramid ringed by sheer cliffs.

=== Cathedral / Lynn range ===
This range begins as just a narrow ridge between Lynn Valley and Seymour Valley, but nonetheless features some large and prominent peaks.

- Lynn Peak (1,015 m; 3,330 ft) – This small forested mountain is a popular hiking destination due to ease of access.
- The Needles (1,258 m; 4,127 ft) – An isolated series of ridge-top summits north of Lynn Peak.
- Mount Burwell (1,541 m; 5,056 ft) – A remote granite dome located at the limit of legal backcountry access.
- Coliseum Mountain (1,441 m; 4,728 ft) – A subpeak of Mount Burwell named for its resemblance to Roman ruins, consisting of a series of gentle granite exposures.
- Cathedral Mountain (1,737 m; 5,699 ft) – Among the tallest and most prominent of the North Shore Mountains, but off-limits due to its location within the Metro Vancouver watershed.

=== Fannin Range ===
The Fannin Range is the easternmost part of the North Shore Mountains that extends from the western shore of the glacial fjord Indian Arm to headwaters of the Indian River. Mount Seymour Provincial Park and Indian Arm Provincial Park occupy its south-eastern drainage, while its north-eastern drainage is provincial crown land. Its entire western drainage is part of the Seymour Watershed.

- Mount Seymour (1,449 m; 4,754 ft) – Good trails and convenient access by road make Seymour a local classic hiking area. Downhill ski area in winter.
- Mount Elsay (1,419 m; 4,656 ft) – A backcountry peak located beyond Seymour.
- Mount Bishop (1,509 m; 4,951 ft) – A rarely climbed peak in the remote northern region of Mount Seymour Provincial Park. The second highest peak in the Fannin Range.
- Mount Dickens (1,288 m; 4,226 ft) – A remote peak in Indian Arm Provincial Park above from the Wigwam Inn.
- Mount Jukes (1,574 m; 5,164 ft) – The highest point in the Fannin Range. There are very few recorded ascents due to its remoteness.

=== Britannia Range / Sky Pilot group ===
The Britannia Range is the northernmost part of the North Shore Mountains, although some lists consider it to be a separate range. It is officially bounded by the Stawamus River in the north, the Seymour River in the east, and Deeks Lake in the south.

- Sky Pilot Mountain (2,031 m; 6,663 ft) – Possibly the highest peak of the North Shore Mountains depending on the inclusion of this range. It forms the basis of the Sky Pilot group, a popular mountaineering area which includes several nearby rocky peaks including Co-Pilot (1,881m), Ledge Mountain (1,964m), Mount Sheer (1,752m), and Ben Lomond (1,654 m).
- Mount Habrich (1,792 m; 5,879 ft) – A prominent granite peak visible from Squamish known for its rock climbing routes and pyramidal shape.
- Capilano Mountain (1,692 m; 5,551 ft) – At the headwaters of the Capilano River, east of Furry Creek.
- Deeks Peak (1,672 m; 5,485 ft) – A forested peak overlooking Deeks Lake.

== See also ==
- Geography of British Columbia
- Mountains of British Columbia
- North Shore (Greater Vancouver)
