= Britannia Range =

Britannia Range may refer to:

- Britannia Range (Antarctica)
- Britannia Range (Canada) in the North Shore Mountains north of Vancouver
