= Crown Mountain (North Shore Mountains) =

Mountain in British Columbia, Canada

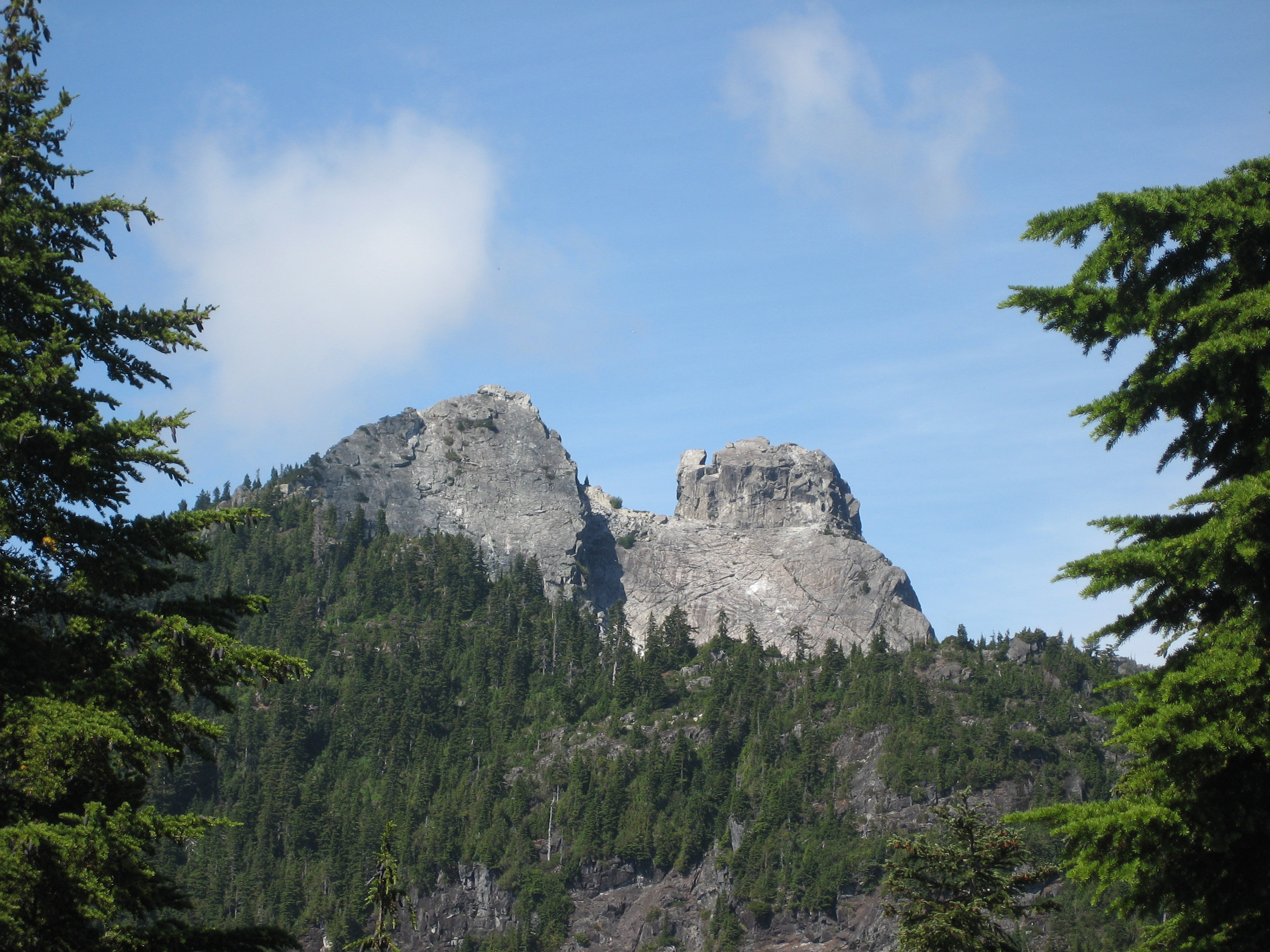

Highest point
- Elevation: 1,504 m (4,934 ft)
- Prominence: 519 m (1,703 ft)
- Parent peak: Cathedral Mountain (1737 m)
- Listing: Mountains of British Columbia
- Coordinates: 49°24′36″N 123°05′31″W

Geography
- Location within British Columbia
- Interactive map of Crown Mountain
- Location: British Columbia, Canada
- District: New Westminster Land District
- Parent range: North Shore Mountains
- Topo map: NTS 92G6 North Vancouver

Climbing
- First ascent: FRA 1895 G. Edward, Knox, Musket, R. Parkinson
- Easiest route: Scramble

Crown Mountain is a mountain located north of North Vancouver, British Columbia, in the North Shore Mountains (part of the Coast Mountains) and is visible from most of Vancouver and the vicinity. A rock formation known as The Camel sits just east of the main summit, and the mountain has west and north peaks. The mountain lies on the fringes of Lynn Headwaters Regional Park.

Crown has a history of local hiking, rock climbing, and mountaineering activity. Access is usually from the Grouse Mountain ski area. It is considered a very challenging objective. The top requires scrambling with the risk of a deadly fall, and is not recommended for novices. The mountain has been the site of numerous search and rescue operations.

== Gallery ==
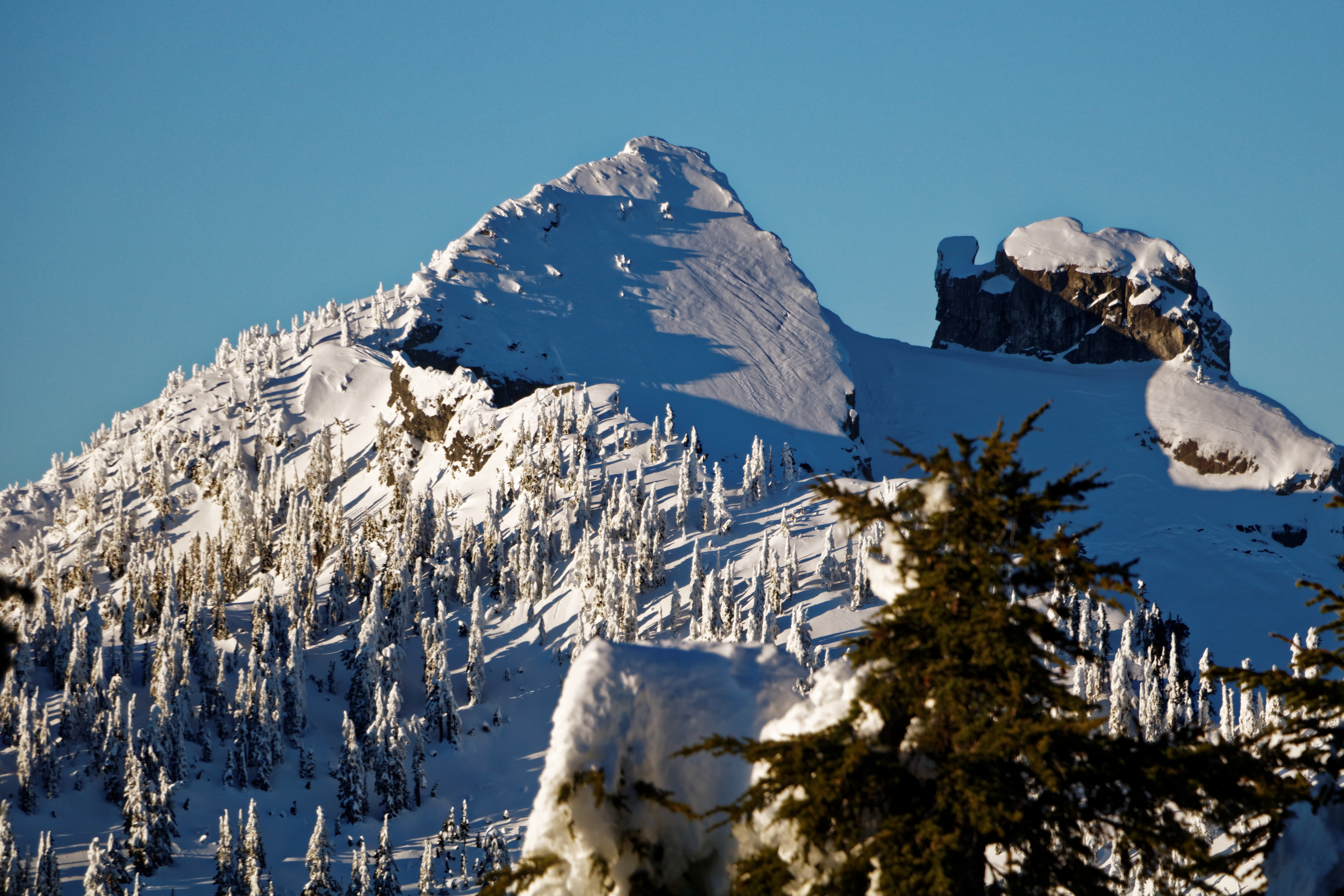
Crown Mountain as seen from the East

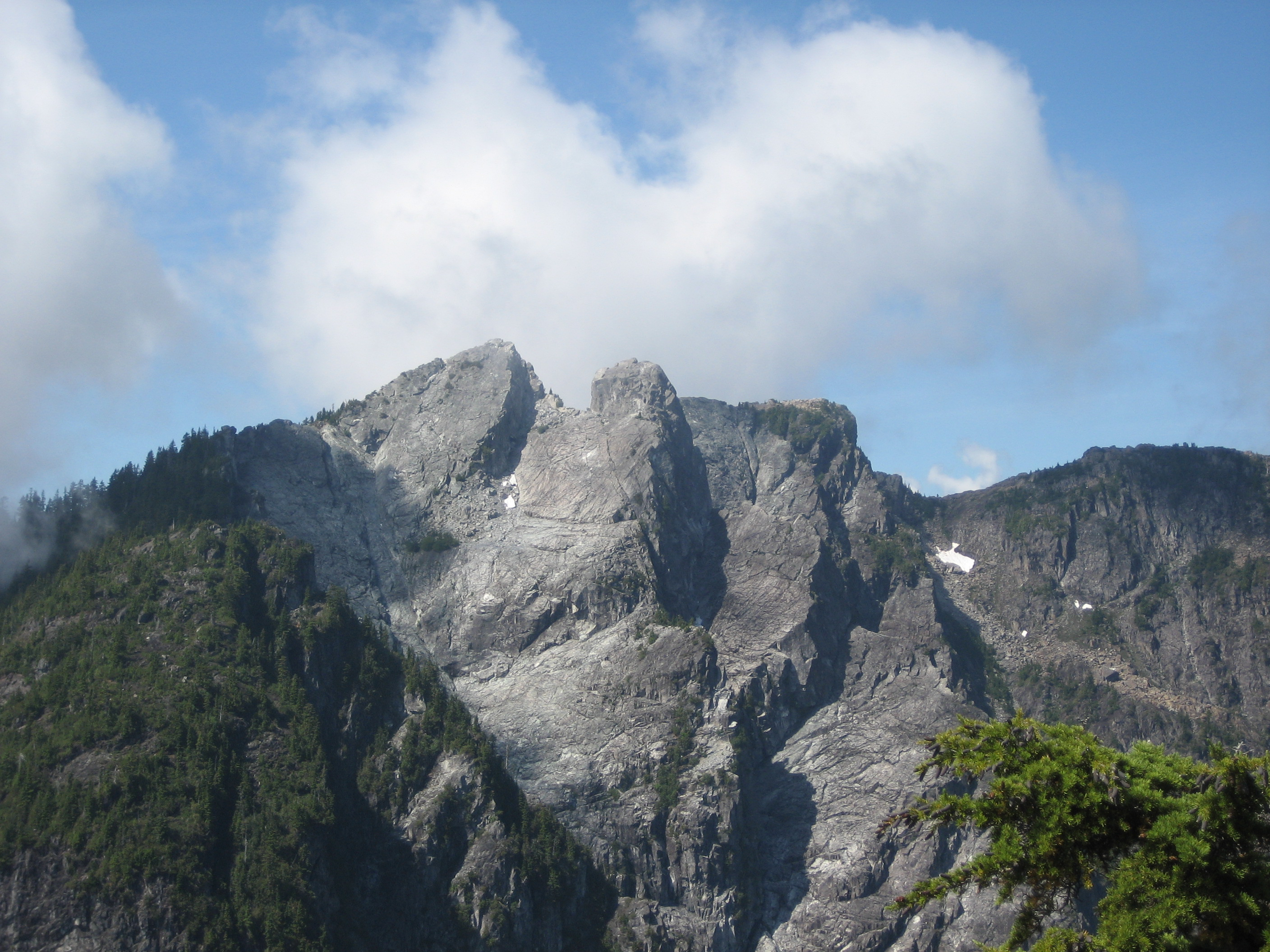

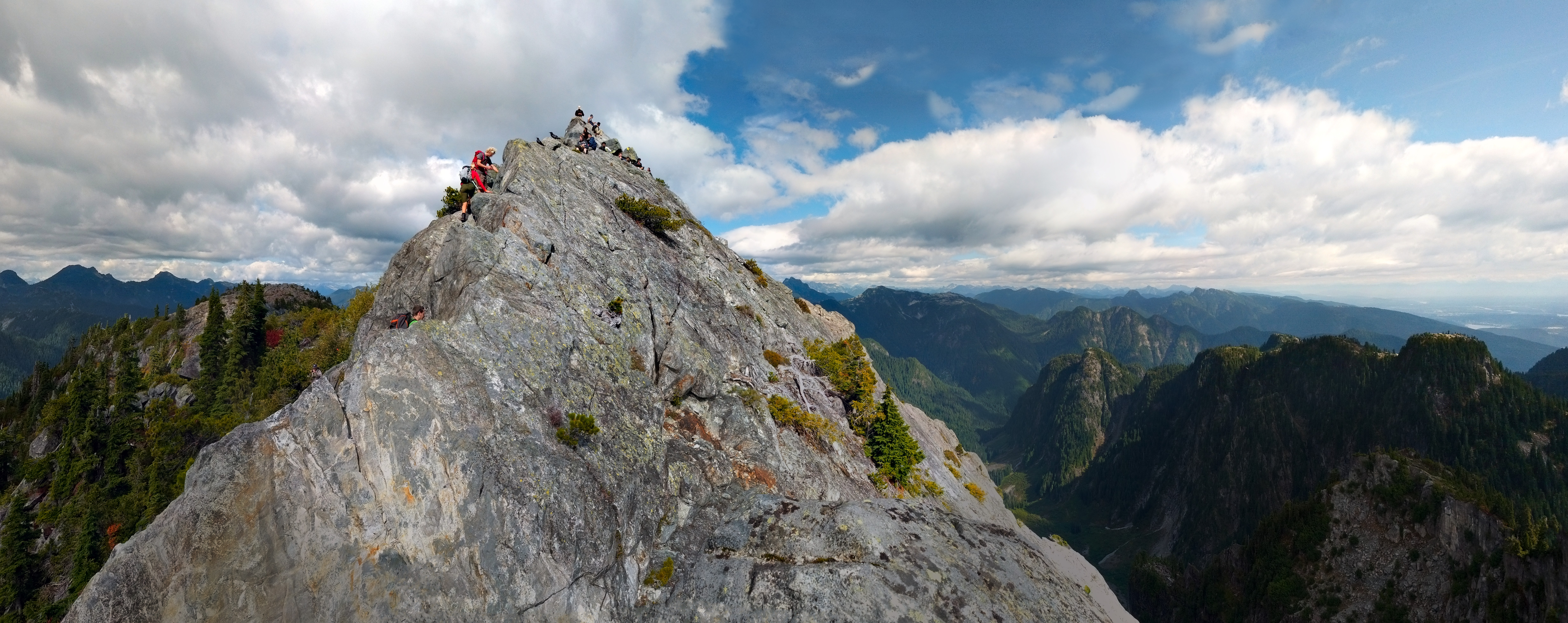
Peak viewed from the south

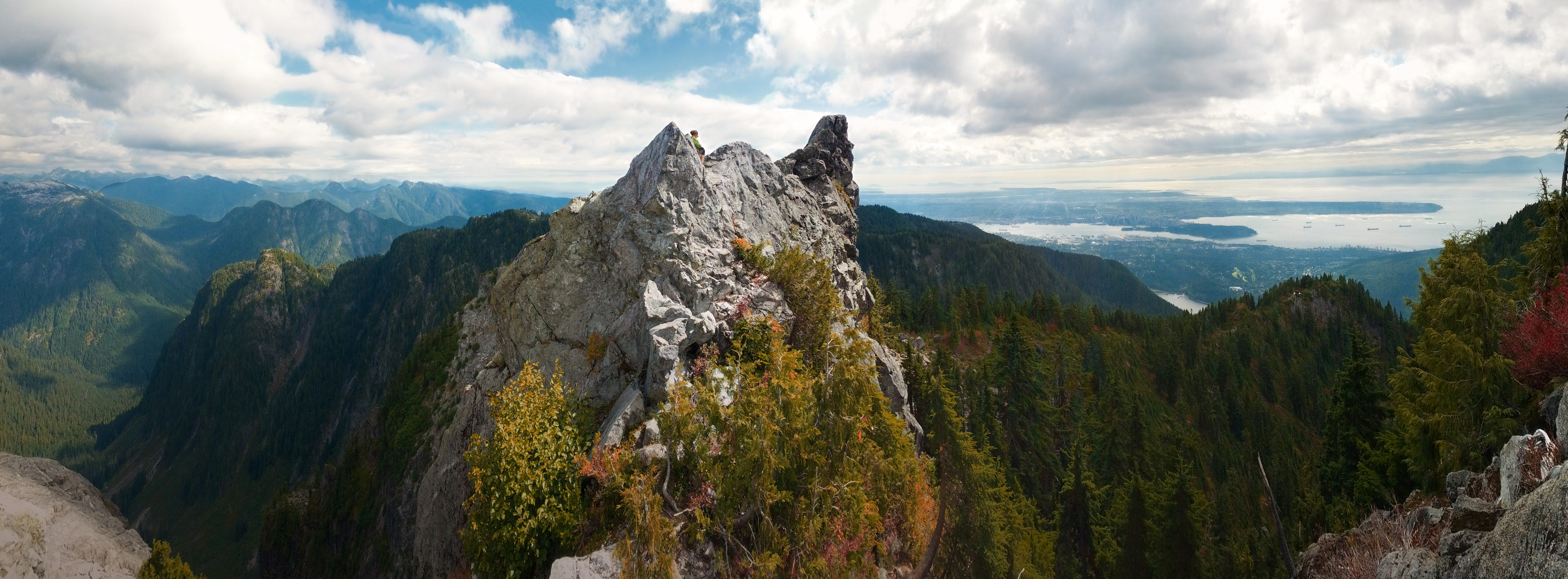
Southern ridge viewed from the peak
