= Mount Harvey (Britannia Range) =

Mountain in British Columbia, Canada

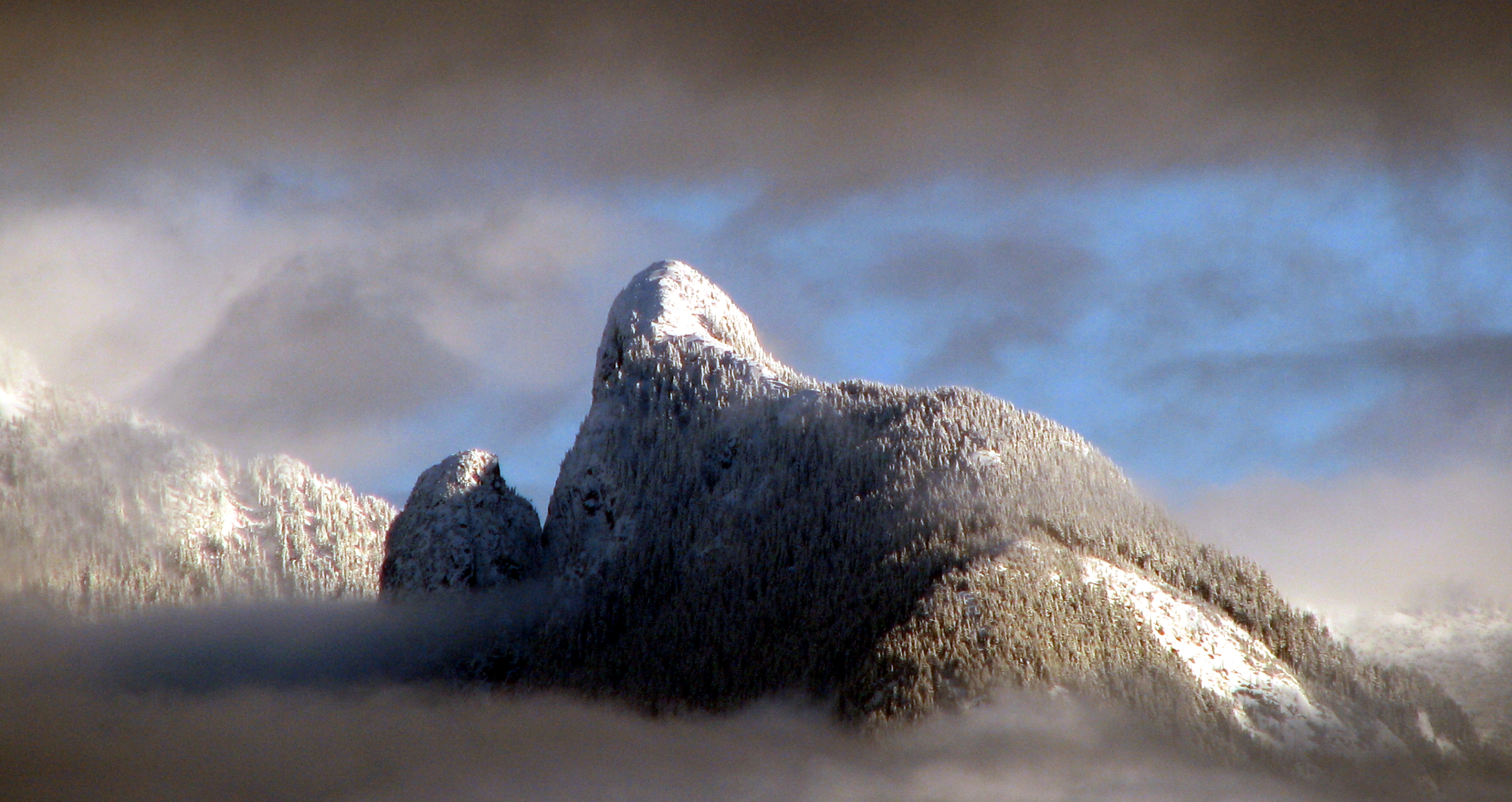
- Mount Harvey, as seen from Bowen Island

Highest point
- Elevation: 1,652 m (5,420 ft)
- Prominence: 202 m (663 ft)
- Parent peak: Brunswick Mountain (1,788 m)
- Listing: Mountains of British Columbia
- Coordinates: 49°28′31″N 123°12′00″W

Geography
- Location within Greater Vancouver Regional District Location within British Columbia
- Interactive map of Mount Harvey
- Location: British Columbia, Canada
- Region: Metro Vancouver Regional District
- District: New Westminster Land District
- Parent range: Britannia Range
- Topo map: NTS 92G6 North Vancouver

Mount Harvey, 1,652 m (5,420 ft), is a mountain in the Britannia Range of the North Shore Mountains just northeast of the Village of Lions Bay, British Columbia, Canada.

It is accessible via the Howe Sound Crest Trail or the Mount Harvey Trail from Lions Bay.

On April 8, 2017, five hikers died when a cornice collapsed, causing them to fall from the north face of the mountain.

== Name origin ==
Like nearby Mount Brunswick, which is Mount Harvey's line parent in prominence terms, and like other placenames in the Howe Sound region, the mountain was named in associated with the marine battle of 1794 known as the Glorious First of June. Such names were conferred by Captain Richards of HMS Plumper during his survey of the region in 1859. John Harvey (1740–1794) was the captain of HMS Brunswick and lost a limb in that battle, dying from complications from it soon afterwards.
