= John Linn (Royal Engineer) =

John Linn was a British Royal Engineer. He was born in Corstorphine and joined the Army in 1846. Two years later he moved to Halifax, Nova Scotia where he was stationed for 9 years. He later settled in British Columbia in 1859. He died on 18 April 1876 from a paralytic stroke. North Vancouver's Lynn Valley is named after him.
