= Mount Hanover =

Mountain in British Columbia, Canada

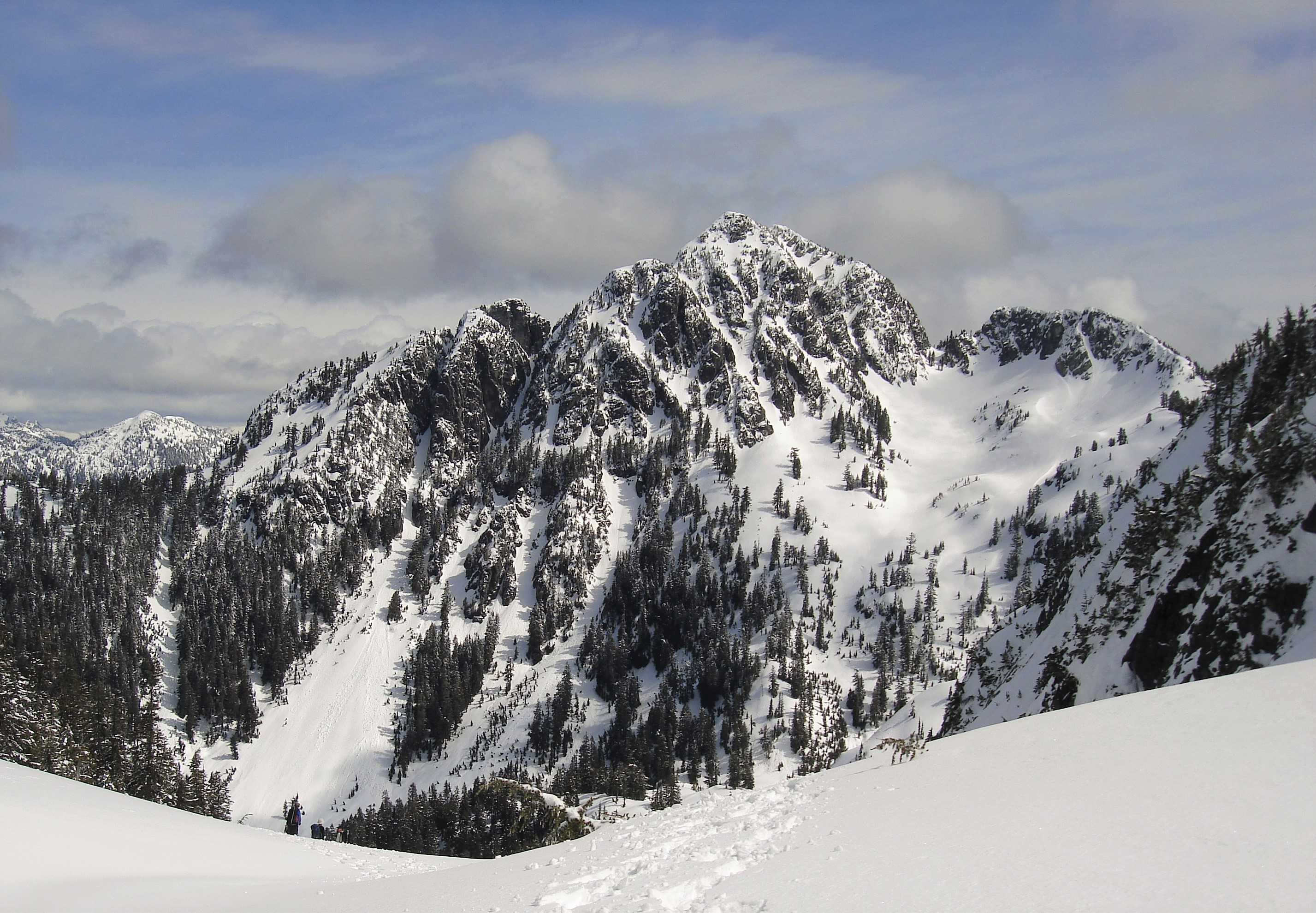
- West aspect, seen from Hat Pass

Highest point
- Elevation: 1,748 m (5,735 ft)
- Prominence: 228 m (748 ft)
- Parent peak: Brunswick Mountain (1,788 m)
- Isolation: 1.45 km (0.90 mi)
- Listing: Mountains of British Columbia
- Coordinates: 49°29′57″N 123°11′02″W

Naming
- Etymology: House of Hanover

Geography
- Location within Squamish-Lillooet Regional District Location within British Columbia
- Interactive map of Mount Hanover
- Location: Cypress Provincial Park; British Columbia, Canada
- Region: Squamish-Lillooet Regional District
- District: New Westminster Land District
- Parent range: Britannia Range; North Shore Mountains; Coast Mountains
- Topo map: NTS 92G6 North Vancouver

Climbing
- First ascent: 1913 by Don Munday and party
- Easiest route: Scrambling via South gully

Mount Hanover is a mountain summit located in British Columbia, Canada.

== Description ==
Mount Hanover is a 1,748-metre-elevation (5,735-foot) peak situated in Cypress Provincial Park, 24 kilometres (15 miles) north of Vancouver, in the Britannia Range of the North Shore Mountains, which are subsets of the Coast Mountains. Hanover is the second-highest peak of the North Shore Mountains, after Brunswick Mountain. Precipitation runoff from Mount Hanover drains east to the Capilano River, and west to Howe Sound via Deeks Creek. Mount Hanover is more notable for its steep rise above local terrain than for its absolute elevation. Topographic relief is significant as the summit rises 1,748 metres (5,735 feet) above Howe Sound in five kilometres (3.1 miles).

== History ==
The first ascent of the summit was made May 23, 1913, by Don Munday, Ben Hanafin and Edward LaPage. The mountain's toponym was officially adopted December 7, 1937, by the Geographical Names Board of Canada. The peaks in the Britannia Range (Mts. Brunswick, Hanover, Windsor) are named for British royalty, in this case the House of Hanover.

== Climate ==
Based on the Köppen climate classification, Mount Hanover is located in the marine west coast climate zone of western North America. Most weather fronts originate in the Pacific Ocean, and travel east toward the Coast Mountains where they are forced upward by the range (Orographic lift), causing them to drop their moisture in the form of rain or snowfall. As a result, the Coast Mountains experience high precipitation, especially during the winter months in the form of snowfall. Temperatures in winter can drop below −20 °C with wind chill factors below −30 °C.

== Gallery ==
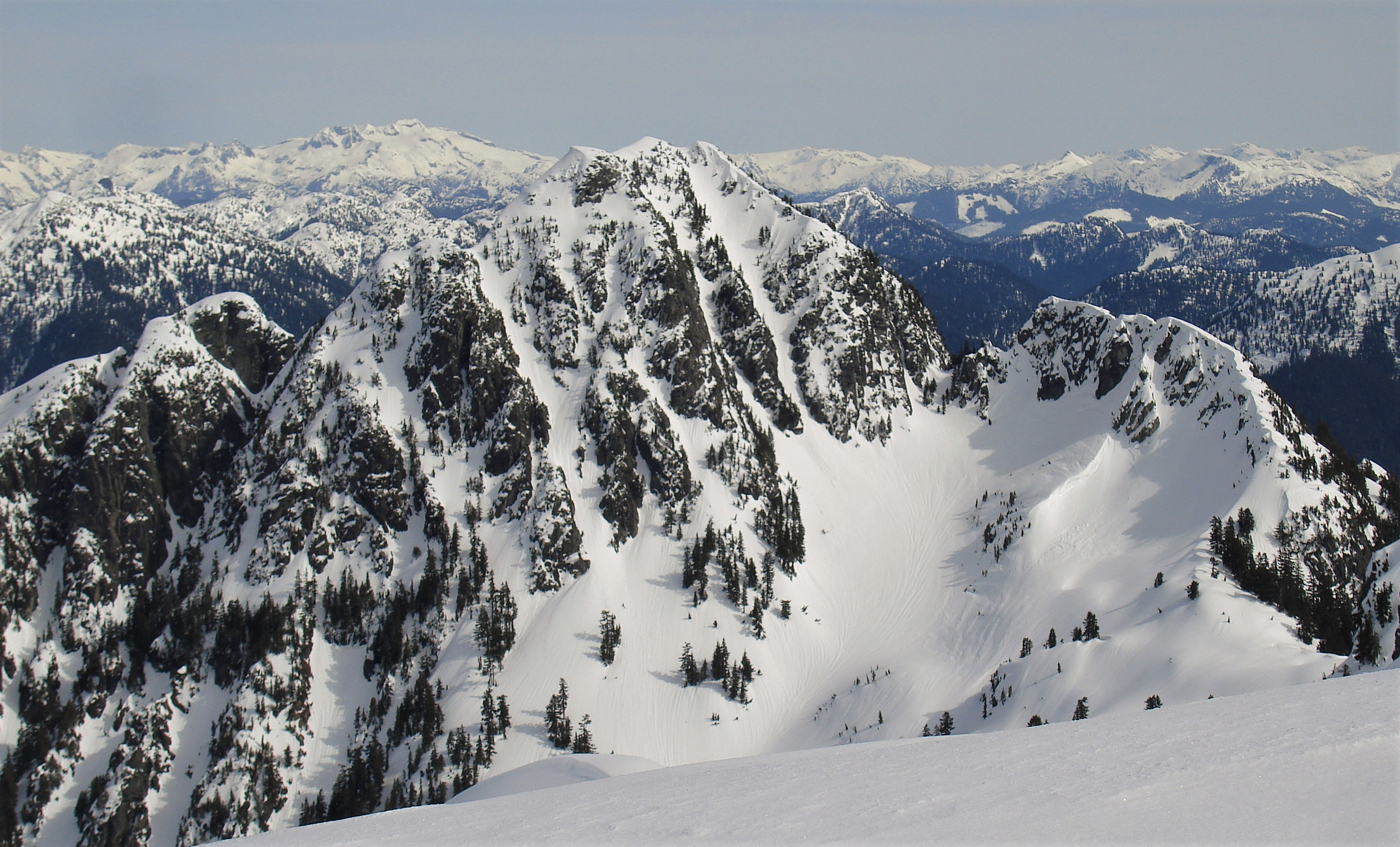
Mt. Hanover seen from Brunswick Mountain

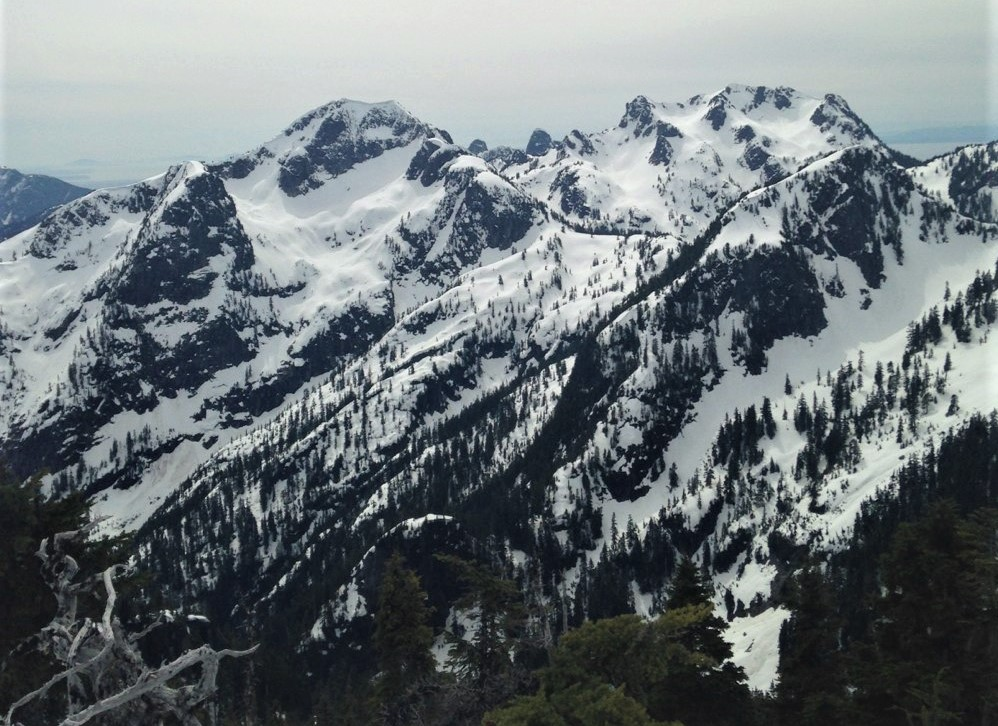
North aspect of Mt. Hanover (left) and Brunswick Mountain (right) seen from Mt. Windsor.

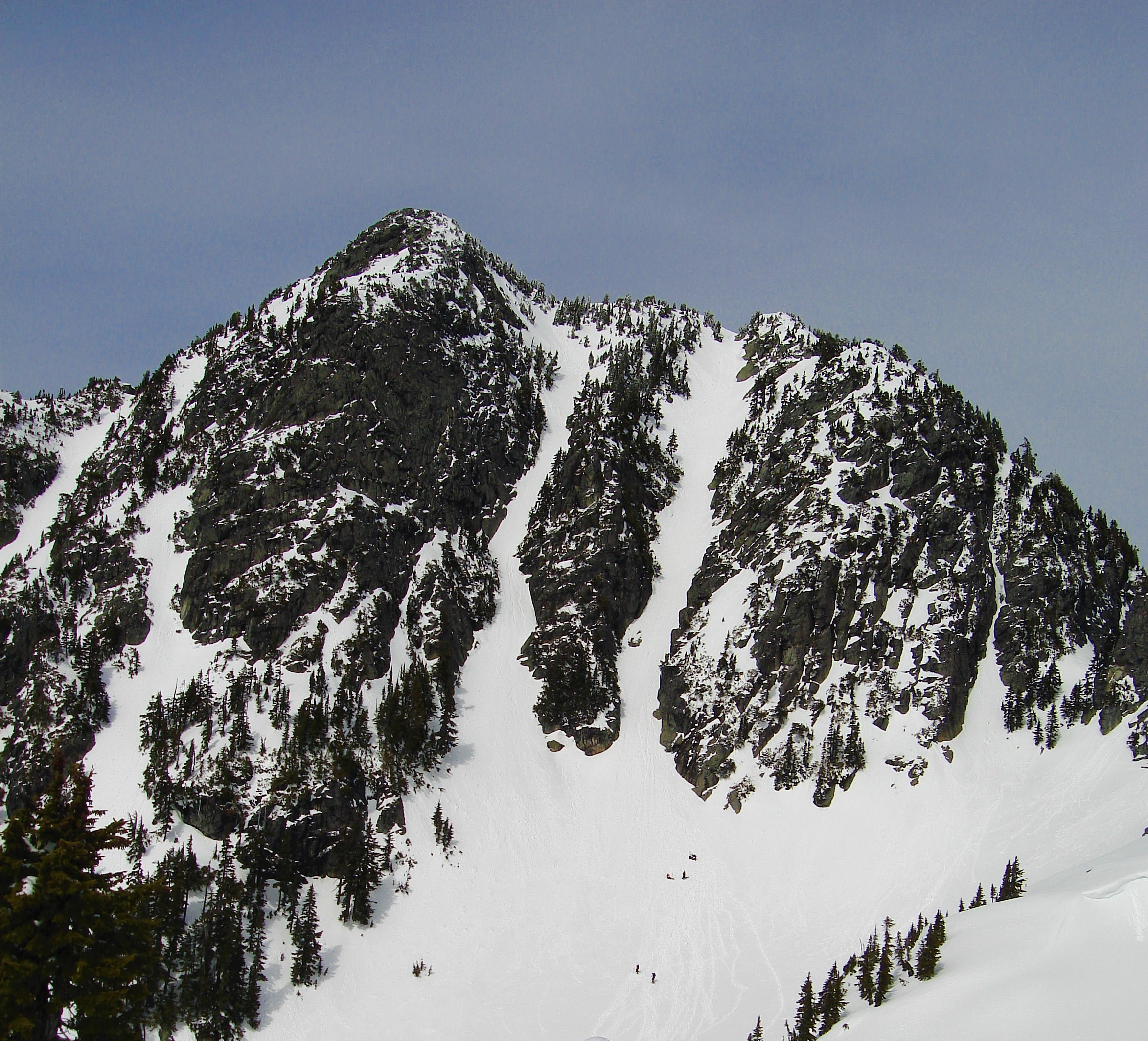
Hanover's south gully

== See also ==
- Geography of British Columbia
