= Sunrise Park =

Recreational area

Coordinates: 49.2665°N 123.0352°W

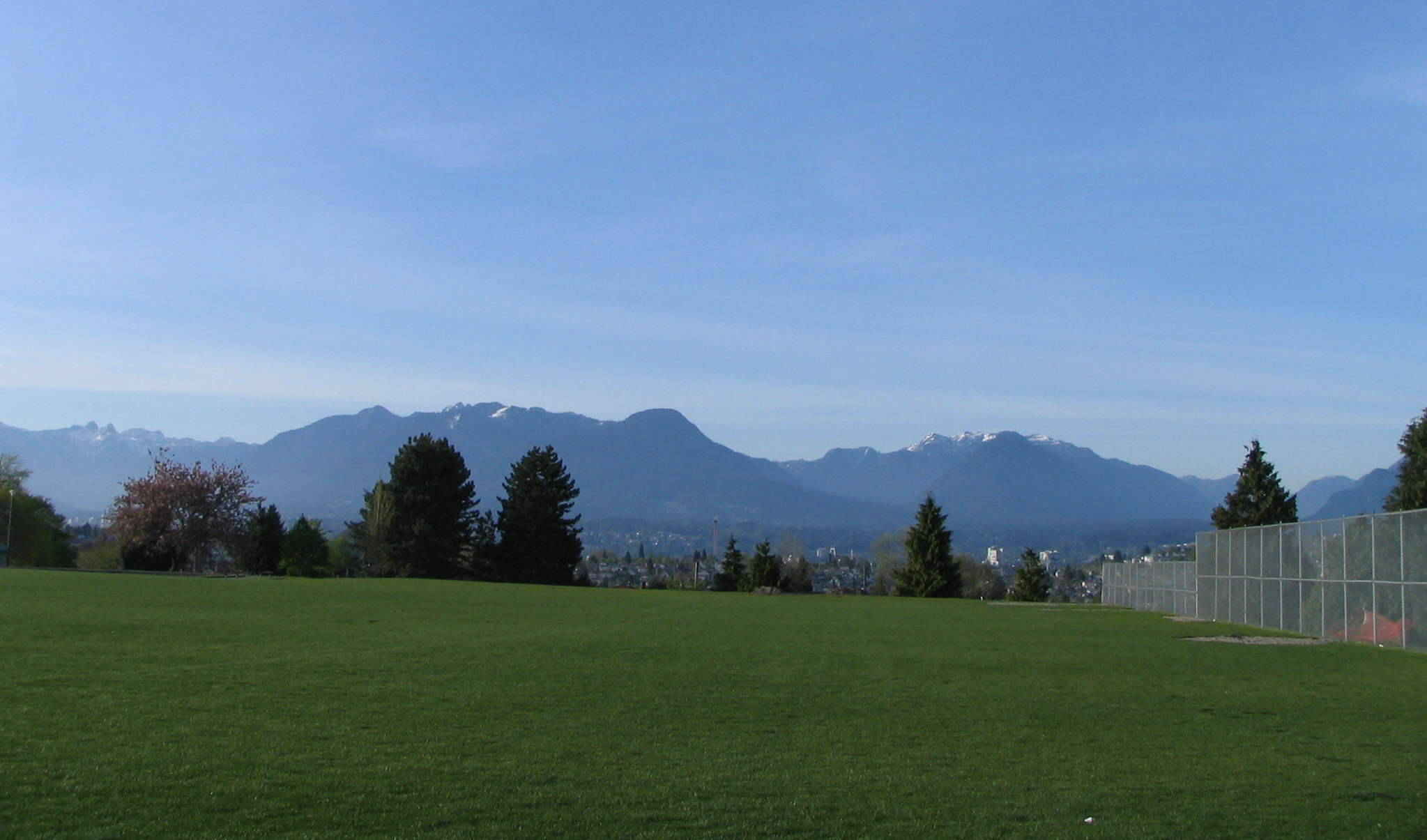
- Sunrise Park, East Vancouver
- Interactive map of Sunrise Park
- Type: Public Park
- Location: Vancouver, British Columbia
- Operator: City of Vancouver

Sunrise Park is a popular urban park in East Vancouver, British Columbia, Canada. It is located south of 1st Ave E and north of East Broadway, between Windermere Street and Rupert Street.

Sunrise Park has a community centre, a baseball field and a children's playground.

Sunrise Park offers panoramic views towards the North Shore Mountains, Burnaby Mountain, and Mount Baker, an active volcano in Washington State.
