= Brunswick, British Columbia =

Coordinates: 51.633°N 127.557°W

Location of Brunswick in British Columbia

Brunswick is a settlement in British Columbia, located near the Village of Lions Bay. The name Brunswick is used for the railway point and former flagstop at this location for the British Columbia Railway.

== Name ==
The locality was named in association with nearby Mount Brunswick, which was named for HMS Brunswick, which was in the Battle of the Glorious First of June in 1794.
