= Mount Brunswick =

Mountain in British Columbia, Canada

- Brunswick Mountain
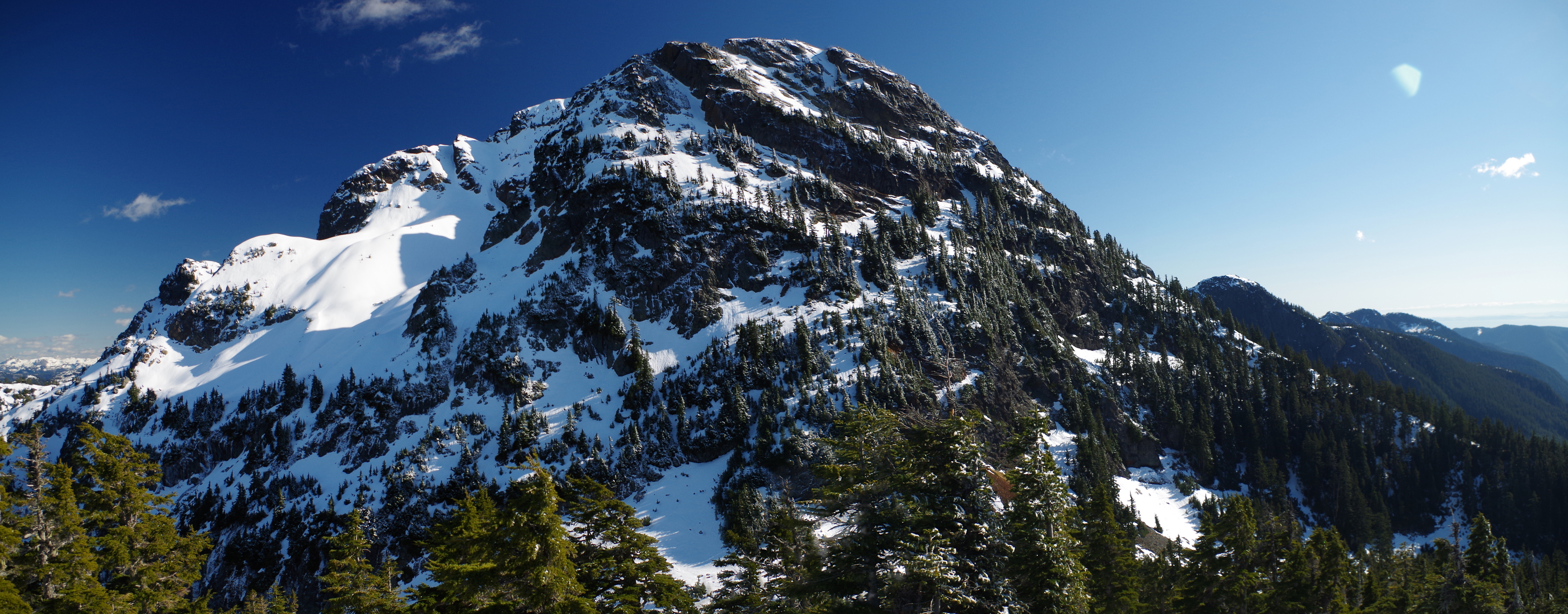

Highest point
- Elevation: 1,788 m (5,866 ft)
- Prominence: 1,294 m (4,245 ft)
- Parent peak: Sky Pilot Mountain
- Listing: Mountains of British Columbia
- Coordinates: 49°29′16″N 123°12′05″W

Geography
- Location within Greater Vancouver Regional District Location within British Columbia
- Interactive map of Mount Brunswick
- Location: British Columbia, Canada
- Region: Squamish-Lillooet Regional District
- District: New Westminster Land District
- Parent range: Britannia Range
- Topo map: NTS 92G6 North Vancouver

Climbing
- First ascent: 1889

Mount Brunswick (officially Brunswick Mountain), 1,788 metres (5,866 ft), is a summit in the Britannia Range of the North Shore Mountains on the Howe Sound side of the latter range. The mountain is located just northeast of the village of Lions Bay and is the namesake of Brunswick Beach, a locality on the Howe Sound shoreline below. Brunswick is often considered the highest peak of the North Shore Mountains.

It is accessible via the Howe Sound Crest Trail or the Brunswick Mountain trail from Lions Bay.

== Name origin ==
Mount Brunswick was, like other names in the Howe Sound area, named in 1859 by Captain Richards in association with the Battle of the Glorious First of June in 1794. HMS Brunswick, 74 guns, 1,836 tons, built at Deptford, 1790, was commanded by Captain John Harvey who lost a limb in the conflict. Also in the area is Mount Harvey, also named for the captain, and nearby is Hutt Island, which was named for Captain John Hutt who also lost a limb and commanded HMS Queen in the battle.
