= Lynn Headwaters Regional Park =

Area in the country of Canada

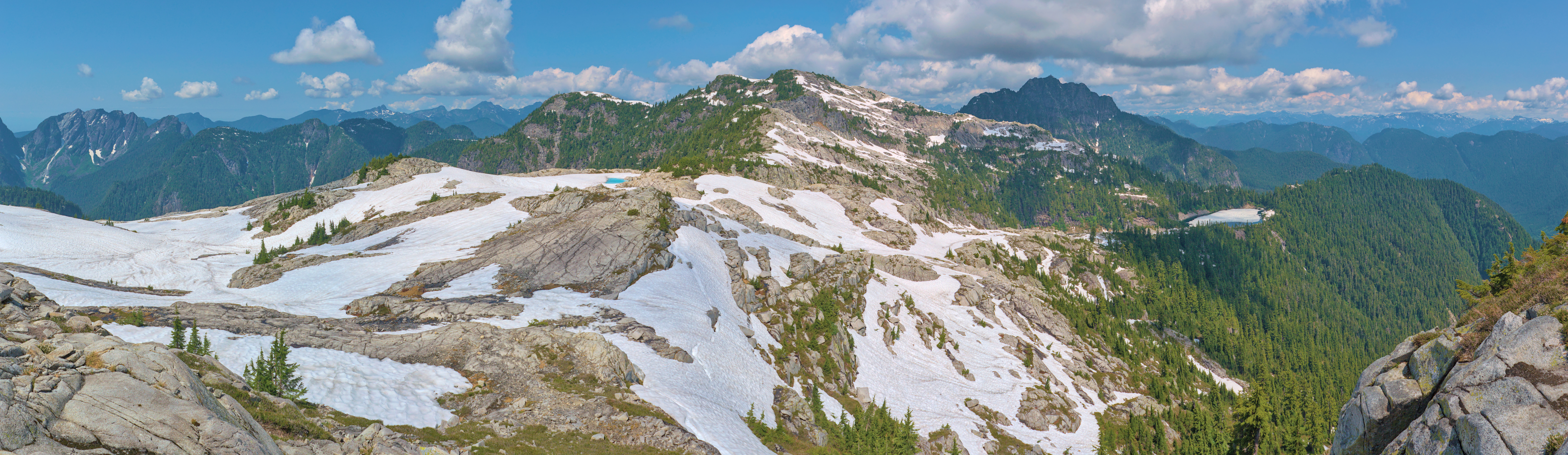
- View from Coliseum Mountain.

- Location within Greater Vancouver Regional District
- Location: North Vancouver, British Columbia
- Coordinates: 49°24′47″N 123°02′17″W
- Area: 617 acres (250 ha)
- Operator: Metro Vancouver Regional District
- Website: metrovancouver.org/services/regional-parks/park/lynn-headwaters-regional-park

Lynn Headwaters Regional Park is an area of North Vancouver, British Columbia, and is the largest of twenty-three regional parks in Metro Vancouver. At 9,216.5 acres (3,729.8 ha), the park boasts a variety of trails for hikers, including easy, intermediate, and challenging. The trails are colour-coded and range from 3 kilometres (1.9 mi) to 21.4 kilometres (13.3 mi). Bikes and dogs are allowed on select trails.

Lynn Headwaters is also home to the BC Mills House, which is a small building near the entrance of the park. The BC Mills House offers information and visual depictions of the natural history and industrial history of the area, including kinds of animals that inhabit the forest and locations of previous mines and logging camps.

== Ecology ==
The park is covered in dense temperate rainforest that houses a wide array of organisms. Like the neighbouring Lynn Canyon Park, Lynn Headwaters is a second growth forest. Cedar stumps can be seen throughout the park, reminding visitors of old logging practices. However, there remain a few scattered trees which are 600 to 700 years old and four to five meters in diameter.

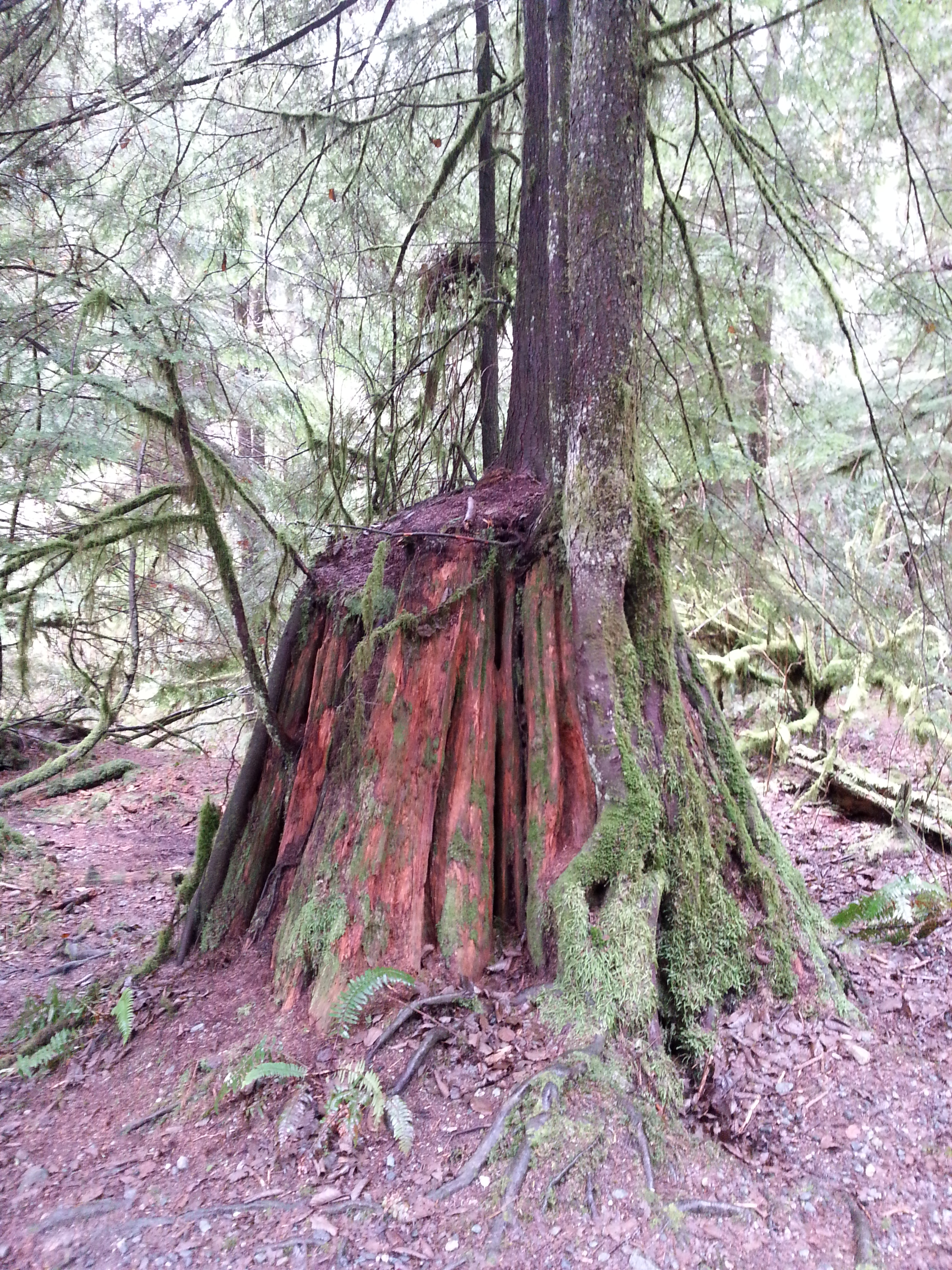
Western red cedar stump

Lynn Headwaters is situated in Lynn Valley on the North Shore of Vancouver. Lynn Headwaters largely sits between two peaks; on one side, the park area is closer to Mount Fromme, and on the other side is Mount Seymour. The temperate rainforest experiences moderate temperatures, plenty of rainfall, and a mild climate that is suitable for growth of large coniferous trees and shade-loving shrubs and ferns. On average per year, the park receives around 200 cm (79 in) of rain, which contributes to the forest's cool and moist quality. The most common coniferous trees in the forests are western red cedar, western hemlock, Douglas fir and sitka spruce. Red alder, black cottonwood, vine maple and broadleaf maple are deciduous trees that also inhabit the forest. Additionally, ground hugging flora are present, including some mosses and ferns, salmonberry, Oregon grape and salal.

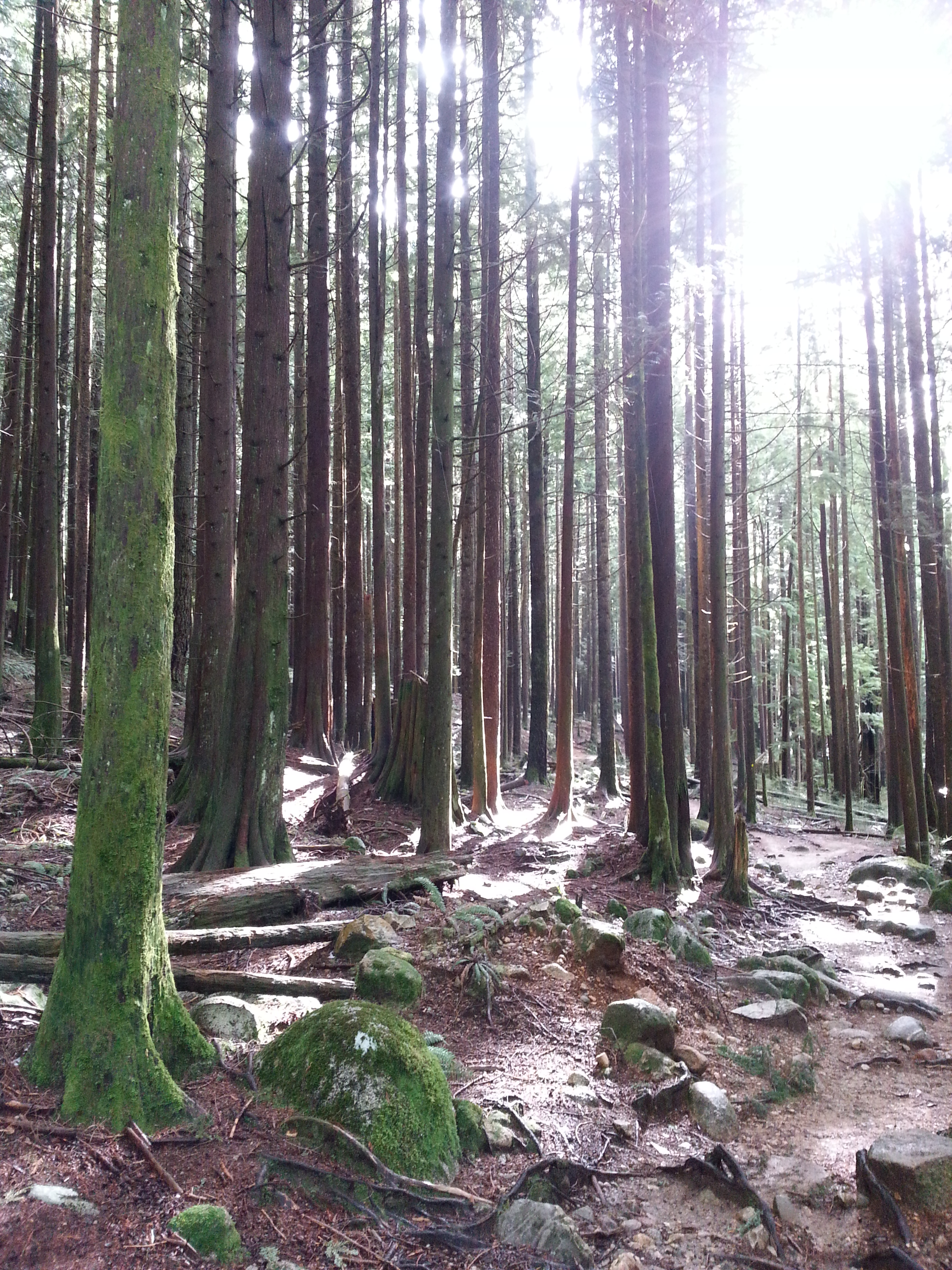
Second growth forest

Lynn Headwaters is the habitat for a diversity of fauna. Some mammals include squirrels, raccoons, mice, and deer. Amphibians and insects include the salamander, mayfly, caddisfly and stonefly. Also, some birds that are present are red-breasted sapsuckers, winter wrens, owls, crows, chickadees and northern flickers.

== History ==
Much of the original woody vegetation inhabiting the Lynn Headwaters area has been logged. In 1863, the first lumber mill began operation and cleared most of the old growth trees. Remnants of these giants can be found in old, sizeable stumps. After this logging, 5 hectares (12 acres) of cleared land was donated to the district of North Vancouver with the intention to encourage people to purchase real estate. The district also contributed 4 acres (1.6 ha) to supplement the project. In 1991, the district again added 241 hectares (600 acres) of land to the park making it the largest in North Vancouver.

== Conservation ==
Lynn Headwaters is just off of the Lower Seymour Conservation Reserve (LSCR) area. The Rice Lake trail, which can be accessed from the Lynn Headwaters entrance runs through a part of the conservation reserve. The LSCR is 5,668 hectares (14,010 acres) and contains a diversity of landscapes: forested slopes, river flood plains and alpine meadows. Since 1908, the Seymour river has been used as a water supply. It has also been used by gold miners, hunters, farmers and fishermen. Until 1994 with the ceasing of logging, watershed land has since been used as a water treatment, storage, and delivery facility. Currently, it is used for educational purposes that emphasize environmentally notable land management practices.

== Trails ==
Lynn Valley Regional Park offers a variety of hiking trails ranging in difficulty. Near BC Mills House, a number of picnic tables are available and separate male and female outhouse washroom facilities. Across the bridge over the creek, an information board describes trail conditions and shows a map of the trails. From this place, hikers can access the Varley Trail, the Lynn Valley Loop Trail, and the Lynn Peak Trail. Other trails require walking along one of the previous hikes initially until a trail marker indicates another route option. Also accessible from the parking lot are the Baden Powell Trail towards Grouse Mountain and Rice Lake within the Lower Seymour Conservation Reserve.

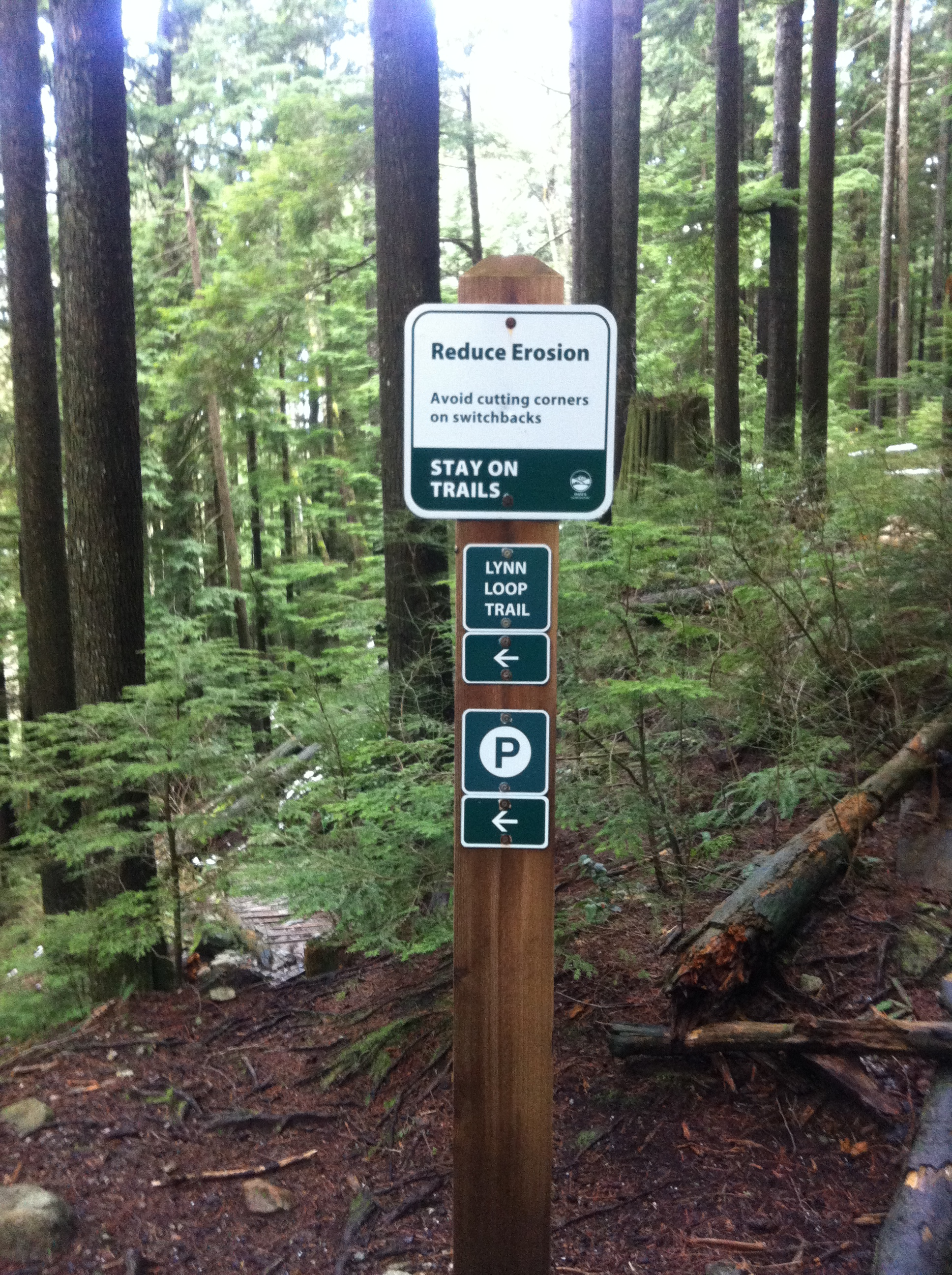
Signs guide hikers to be cautionary on certain trails

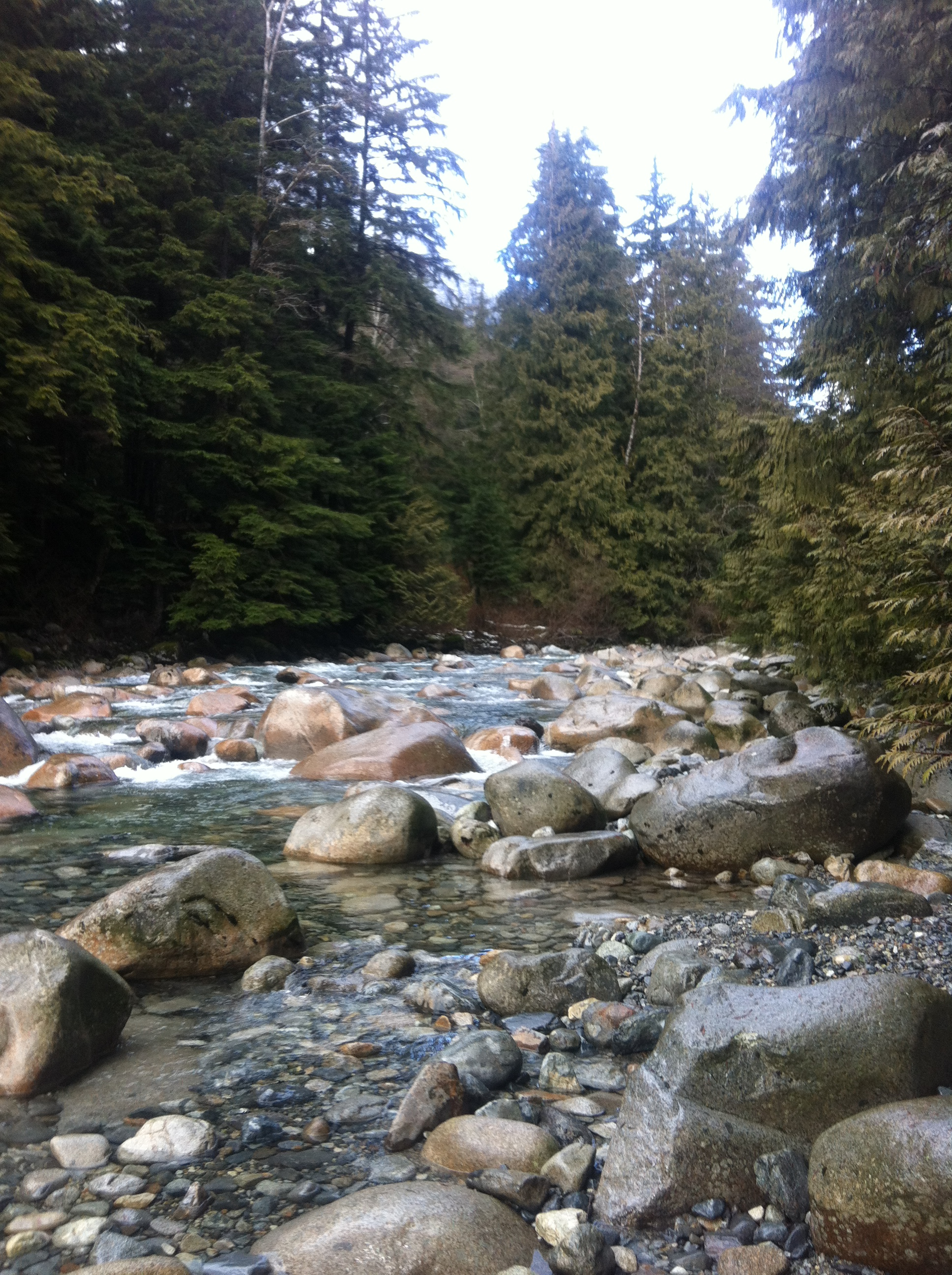
Lynn Creek

=== Varley Trail ===
The Varley Trail takes hikers south along the creek 1.5 km (0.93 mi). The trail is named after Frederick Varley, one of the famed Group of Seven (artists). This trail is only gently sloped in some sections and is deemed appropriate for all hiking levels. Dogs are allowed on this trail.

=== Lynn Valley Loop Trail ===
The Lynn Loop Trail is an estimated 1.5-hour trail, with a round trip distance of 5.2 km (3.2 mi). This walk guides you along a slight incline adjacent to the fresh water creek, and through the mountains and forest of North Vancouver. As you walk over the bridge and past the rushing water of Lynn Creek with Mount Fromme in the backdrop, to your left there will be wooden fence where the Lynn Loop trail begins. This path parallels the Lynn Creek waters for roughly two kilometers, then loops up into a deeper part the forest with varying steep sections. Nearing the end, the incline returns to normal, bringing hikers back to the bridge area.

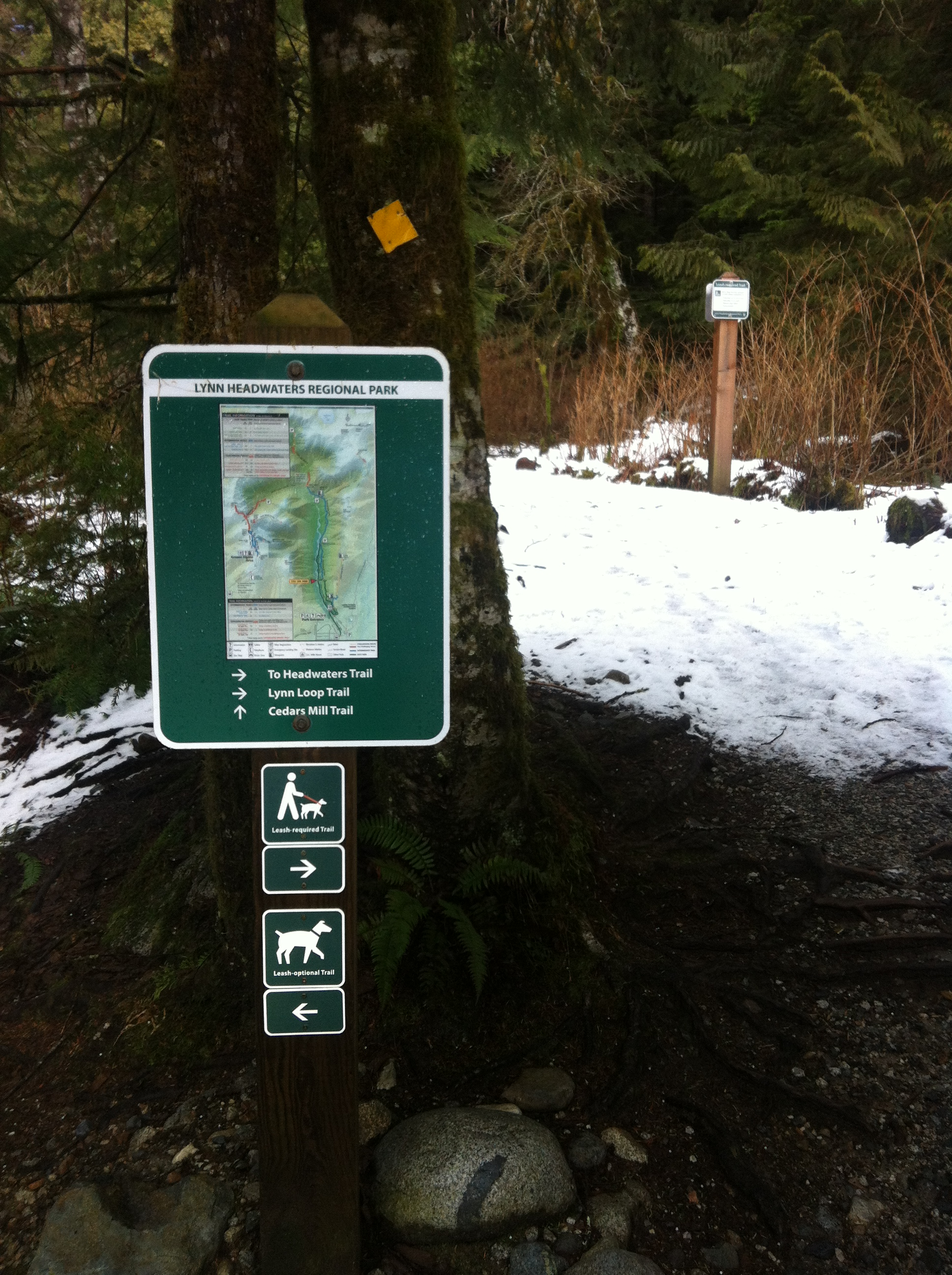
Halfway Mark at Lynn Roundabout

=== Lynn Peak Trail ===
The Lynn Peak Trail is a rigorous hike in Lynn Headwaters Regional Park with a distance of 9 km to the summit. The incline is comparable to the popular Grouse Grind up Grouse Mountain.

=== Cedars Mill and Lynn Headwaters Trail Loop ===
To access the Cedars Mill and Lynn Headwaters Trail Loop, hikers must first walk along the Lynn Valley Loop trail adjacent to the creek until the paths diverge. The trail is eight kilometres long and takes an estimated four hours as a round trip.

=== Lynn Lake Trail ===
A very challenging hike only recommended to experienced hikers, the Lynn Lake trail is only accessible during summer months when the lake levels are low. The distance is 22 km (14 mi), which can take hikers eight hours or more to complete. Interested hikers will take the Lynn Valley Loop Trail, continuing onto the Cedars Mill Trail for 2 km (1.2 mi), then the Lynn Headwaters Trail up to Norvan Falls. Take the Norvan Creek route for about 1km then turn right onto Lynn Lake Trail. This trail requires extensive knowledge of hiking safety and preparation for treacherous conditions.

=== Coliseum Mountain Trail ===
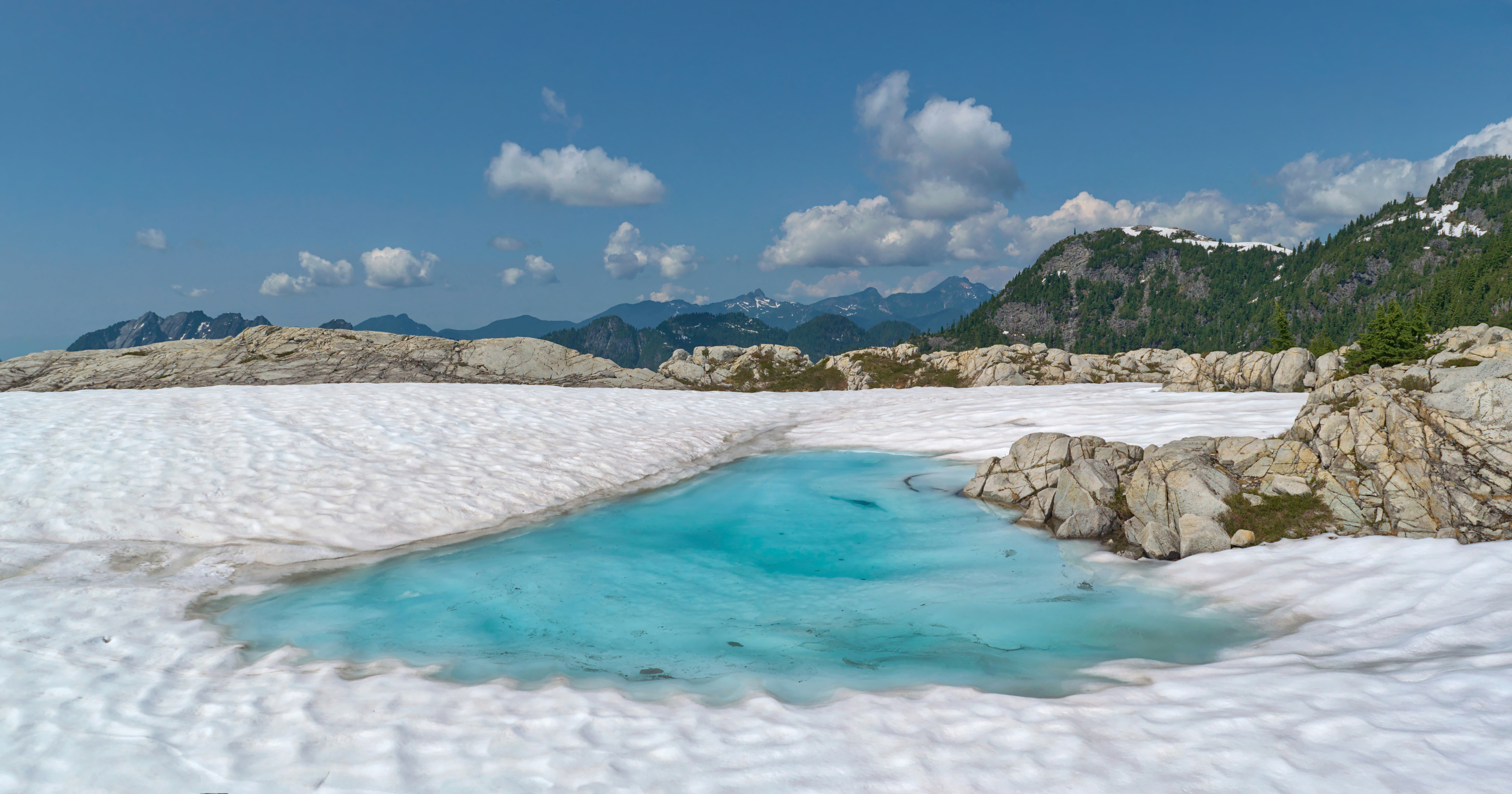
Coliseum Mountain Tarn

An equally challenging hike to the Lynn Lake Trail is the Coliseum Mountain Trail. This trail, recommended for experienced hikers only, is 23 km (14 mi) and takes about 9.5 hours. Similar to Lynn Lake Trail, hikers will take the Lynn Valley Loop Trail, continuing onto the Cedars Mill Trail for 2 km (1.2 mi). Continuing onto the Lynn Headwaters Trail, take a right at the junction for Coliseum Mountain Trail prior to Norvan Falls. This trail requires extensive knowledge of hiking safety and preparation for treacherous conditions.

=== Hanes Valley Trail ===
Probably the most difficult trail in Lynn Headwaters Regional Park, the Hanes Valley Trail should only be undertaken by experienced and fit hikers. It can be completed in a 30 km (19 mi) loop or 17 km (11 mi) point-to-point hike to the Grouse Mountain sky-ride (car-drop required). North Shore Rescue saves many people in this area, so be very well prepared on this strenuous route.

== Safety ==
The park makes efforts to ensure hikers are well prepared for the trails and signs on site offer information about current weather conditions, trail conditions, and proper gear. As well, there is a hiker registration box that allows visitors to sign in and out. Back country trails are much more rugged and are suggested only for the most experienced and prepared hikers. Certain trails are dog-friendly though biking is not allowed. In the summer months, BC Mills House is available to educate hikers on current weather and trail conditions.

== Access ==
Access to the Lynn Headwaters Park can be done by walking or driving to the end of Lynn Valley Road. Within the parking lot of the park, there is an information board that displays trail conditions as well as a map and descriptions of all the trails in the park.

The area is accessible by car via BC Highway 1 and Lynn Valley Road; the site includes parking lots. Public transit does not stop near the park entrance, but does facilitate on-foot access.
