= Lynn Canyon Suspension Bridge =

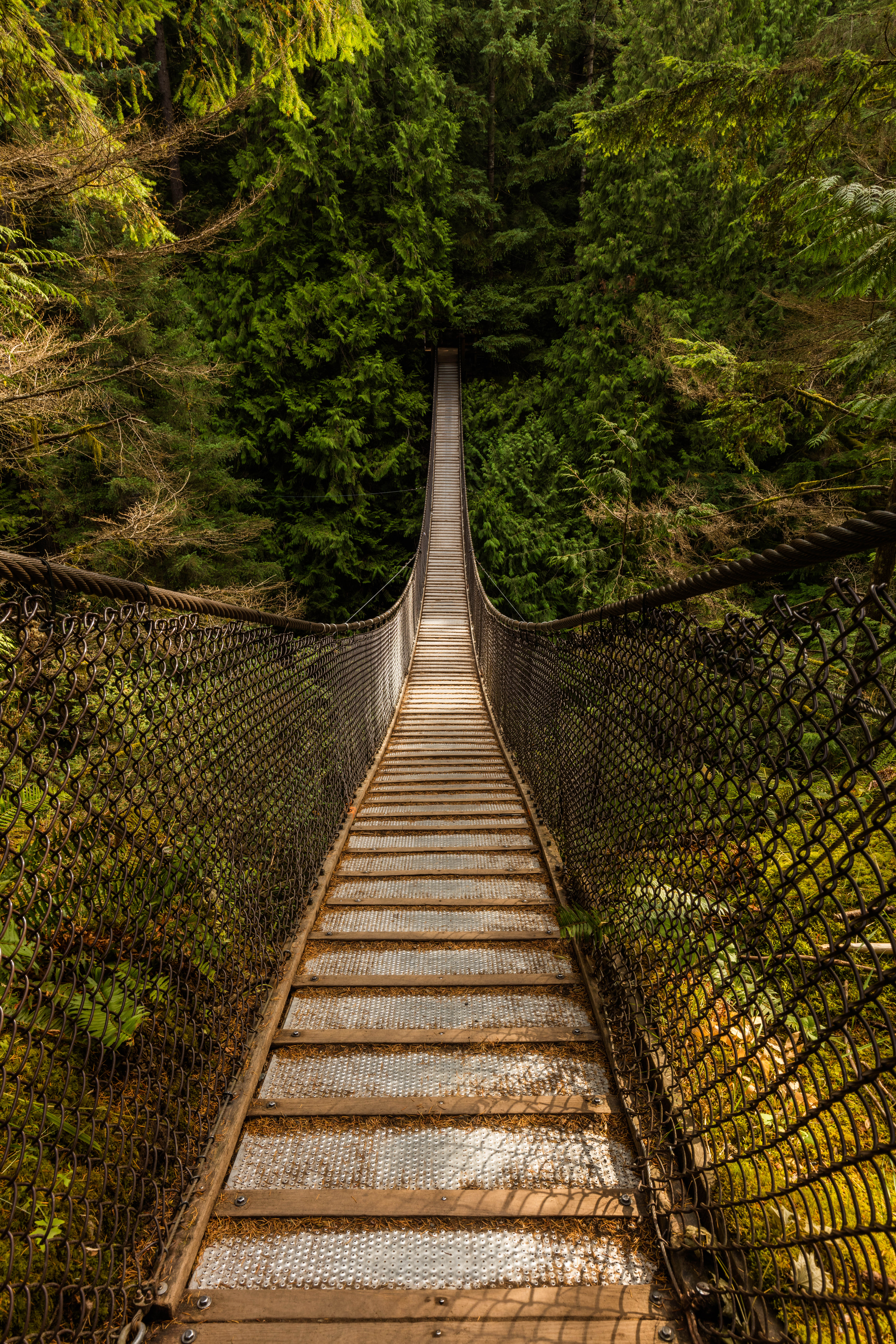
- Lynn Canyon Suspension Bridge, 2017.
- Coordinates: 49°20′37.47″N 123°01′04.65″W
- Carries: Pedestrians
- Locale: Lynn Canyon Park
- Website: lynncanyon.ca

Characteristics
- Design: Suspension bridge
- Height: 50m

History
- Opened: 1912

Statistics
- Toll: No

Location
- Interactive map of Lynn Canyon Suspension Bridge

The Lynn Canyon Suspension Bridge is a pedestrian bridge located within Lynn Canyon Park, in the District of North Vancouver, British Columbia. It is 50 metres (160 ft) high from the bottom of the canyon. The bridge was built as a private venture in 1912.

The bridge connects the extensive hiking trails on the two sides of the canyon and is part of the Baden-Powell Trail. However, many of the tourists do not hike, and only visit the suspension bridge. The free-to-access bridge is often compared to the nearby and widely advertised Capilano Suspension Bridge. While the bridge is shorter and not as high, it is narrower and moves around more when people walk on it. For many locals, a major part of the attraction is the difference in price.

== History ==
- At one time visitors were charged a toll of ten cents to cross, before being reduced to five. Upon becoming a public concern the bridge became free to all.

== In television and film ==
- Beyond Belief: Fact or Fiction - In a short story the bridge was used as a filming location and given the fictional name "Syke's Bridge", located on the "Misty Loop Trail". The bridge subsequently broke later in the episode. (episode 44, 2002 — "The Bridge" — said to be true and to have taken place in Texas (USA) in the 1960s)
- The bridge was used in Disney's Descendants as part of Auradon, that leads to Lynn Canyon's 30 Foot Pool used as the Enchanted Lake.
- The bridge featured in the MacGyver episode "The Invisible Killer".

== See also ==
- List of bridges in Canada
