= Baden-Powell Trail =

Hiking trail in British Columbia, Canada

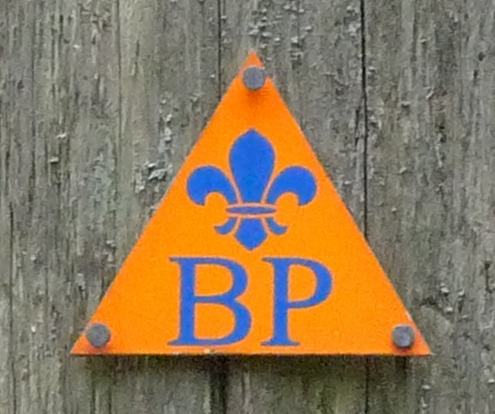
- A Trail Marker on the Baden Powell Trail
- Length: 30 mi (48 km)
- Location: Vancouver, BC
- Trailheads: Horseshoe Bay in West Vancouver
- Use: Hiking, Backpacking

The Baden-Powell Trail is a rugged but well-maintained 48 km hiking trail, that traverses from Horseshoe Bay in West Vancouver to Deep Cove in North Vancouver, British Columbia, Canada. It was named after Robert Baden-Powell, Lord Baden-Powell, founder of the world Scouting Movement.

== Geography ==
The trail is about forty-eight kilometres (48 km) long, extending (west to east) from Horseshoe Bay in West Vancouver to Deep Cove in the District of North Vancouver. In between, the trail winds through the heavily forested North Shore Mountains. It also connects with several other local trails.

== Points of interest ==
There are a number of scenic vistas and points of interest along the way. These include:

- the summit of Black Mountain (1217m)
- Hollyburn Mountain Old-Growth forest
- crossing the Capilano River by way of the Cleveland Dam
- the Grouse Grind, a challenging fitness venue on Grouse Mountain (closed November- April)
- the famous Lynn Canyon Suspension Bridge in Lynn Canyon Park
- a section along Lynn Creek
- a narrow bridge crossing the Seymour Canyon
- the Quarry Rock lookout in Deep Cove
- a view of nearly all of Vancouver from Eagle Bluff, near Cypress Provincial Park.

== Identifying the trail ==
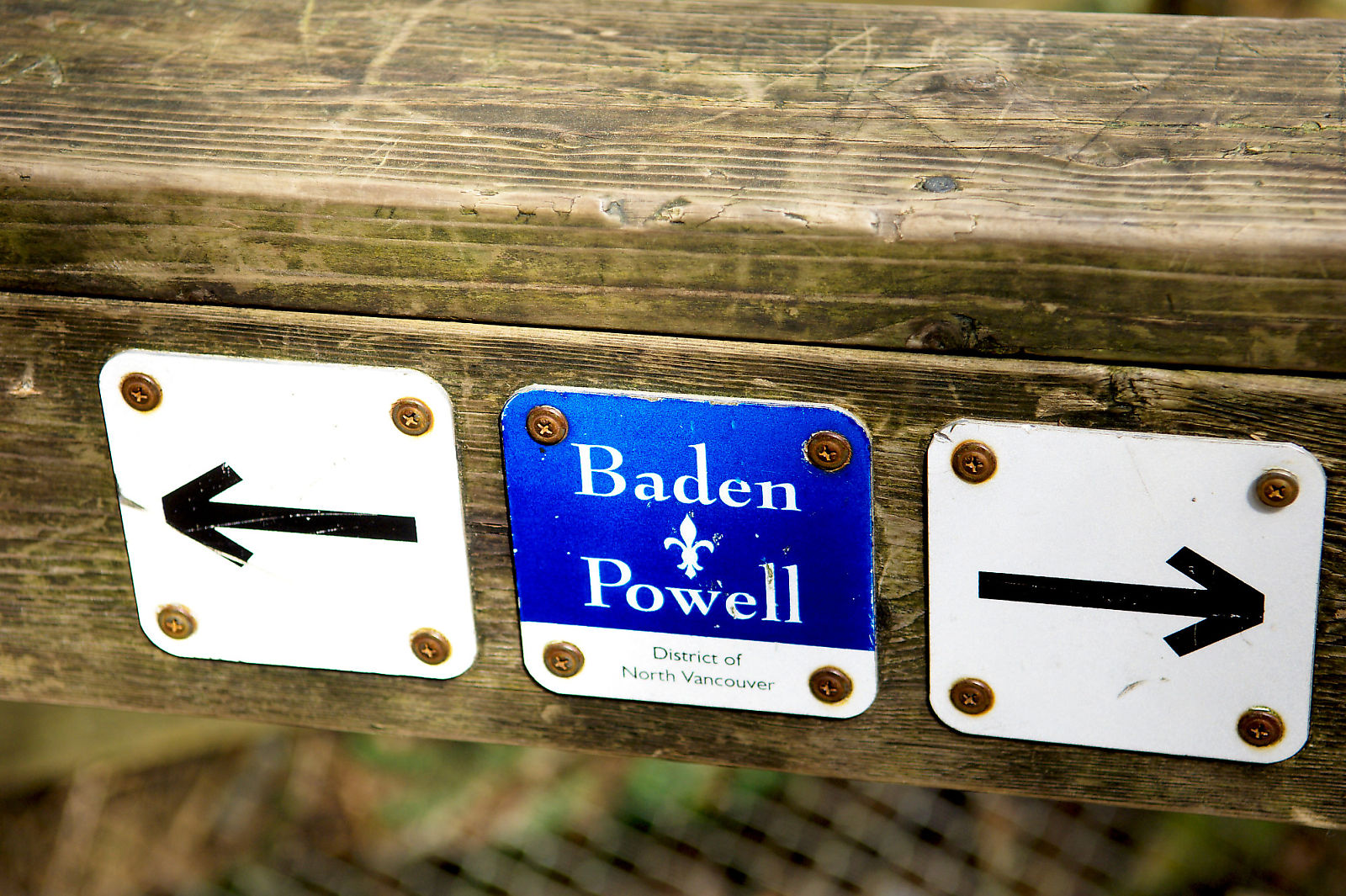
A signpost on the Baden Powell Trail.

The trail is marked with bright orange triangular tags that are attached to trees alongside the trail and some blue directional signage. In addition, regular signposts indicate directions and provide distance measurements. A number of stairways and bridges are installed along the trail to make it passable in steep, difficult, or dangerous terrain. However, the trail surface is not completely clear; there are many obstacles such as exposed roots, large rocks, and massive mud puddles. Some sections of the trail are especially steep and can feel somewhat exposed.

== Construction ==
The trail was constructed in 1971 to celebrate the 100th anniversary of British Columbia's entry into Canada as a province. The project was initiated by the Boy Scouts and Girl Guides organizations of B.C. and much of the work of building it was done by their young members.

== Events ==
Every year, a challenging cross-country trail running race known as the Knee Knackering North Shore Trail Run (or Knee Knacker) is conducted along the full length of the Baden-Powell Trail.

== Access ==
The trail has many access points throughout its entirety. On the West end, the trail starts where Highway 99 (Sea-To-Sky) and Highway 1 diverge, however there is very limited parking at this location. At the East end, the trail starts in Panorama Park, north of the heart of Deep Cove.

== See also ==
- Scouting in British Columbia
