= Cathedral Mountain (North Shore Mountains) =

Mountain in British Columbia, Canada

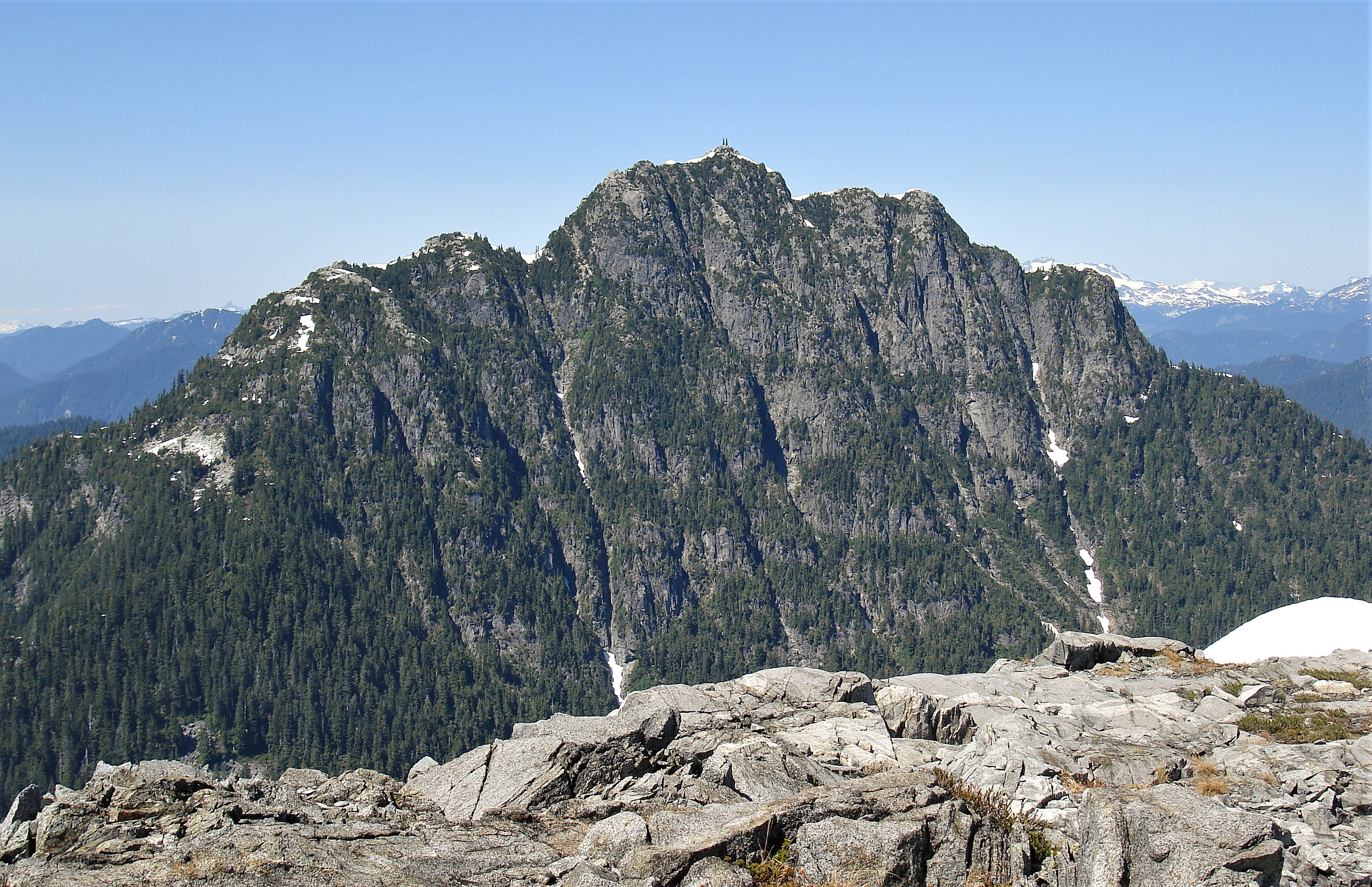
- South aspect, seen from Mt. Burwell

Highest point
- Elevation: 1,737 m (5,699 ft)
- Prominence: 832 m (2,730 ft)
- Parent peak: Mount Sheer (1,752 m)
- Isolation: 13.2 km (8.2 mi)
- Listing: Mountains of British Columbia
- Coordinates: 49°28′00″N 123°00′31″W

Geography
- Location within British Columbia Location within Canada
- Interactive map of Cathedral Mountain
- Location: British Columbia, Canada
- District: New Westminster Land District
- Parent range: North Shore Mountains; Coast Mountains
- Topo map: NTS 92G6 North Vancouver

Climbing
- First ascent: 1908

Cathedral Mountain is a mountain summit located in British Columbia, Canada.

== Description ==
Cathedral Mountain is a 1,737-meter-elevation (5,699-foot) peak situated 25 kilometers (16 miles) north of Vancouver, in the North Shore Mountains which are a subrange of the Coast Mountains. Precipitation runoff from Cathedral Mountain drains east to the Seymour River, and west to the Capilano River via Eastcap Creek. Cathedral is more notable for its steep rise above local terrain than for its absolute elevation. Topographic relief is significant as the summit rises 1,500 meters (4,900 feet) above Seymour Valley in three kilometers (1.9 miles). Access to the peak is off-limits because the mountain lies within the Metro Vancouver watersheds which provide clean drinking water to the city. There are radio repeater towers on the summit.

== History ==
The first ascent of the summit was made 11 October 1908 by Basil S. Darling and H. Hewton.

The landform was named for its cathedral-like appearance when viewed from the northeast by a British Columbia Mountaineering Club party who were climbing Mount Dickens in 1908. The mountain's toponym was officially adopted May 6, 1924, by the Geographical Names Board of Canada.

== Climate ==
Based on the Köppen climate classification, Cathedral Mountain is located in the marine west coast climate zone of western North America. Most weather fronts originate in the Pacific Ocean, and travel east toward the Coast Mountains where they are forced upward by the range (Orographic lift), causing them to drop their moisture in the form of rain or snowfall. As a result, the Coast Mountains experience high precipitation, especially during the winter months in the form of snowfall. Temperatures in winter can drop below −20 °C with wind chill factors below −30 °C.

== Gallery ==
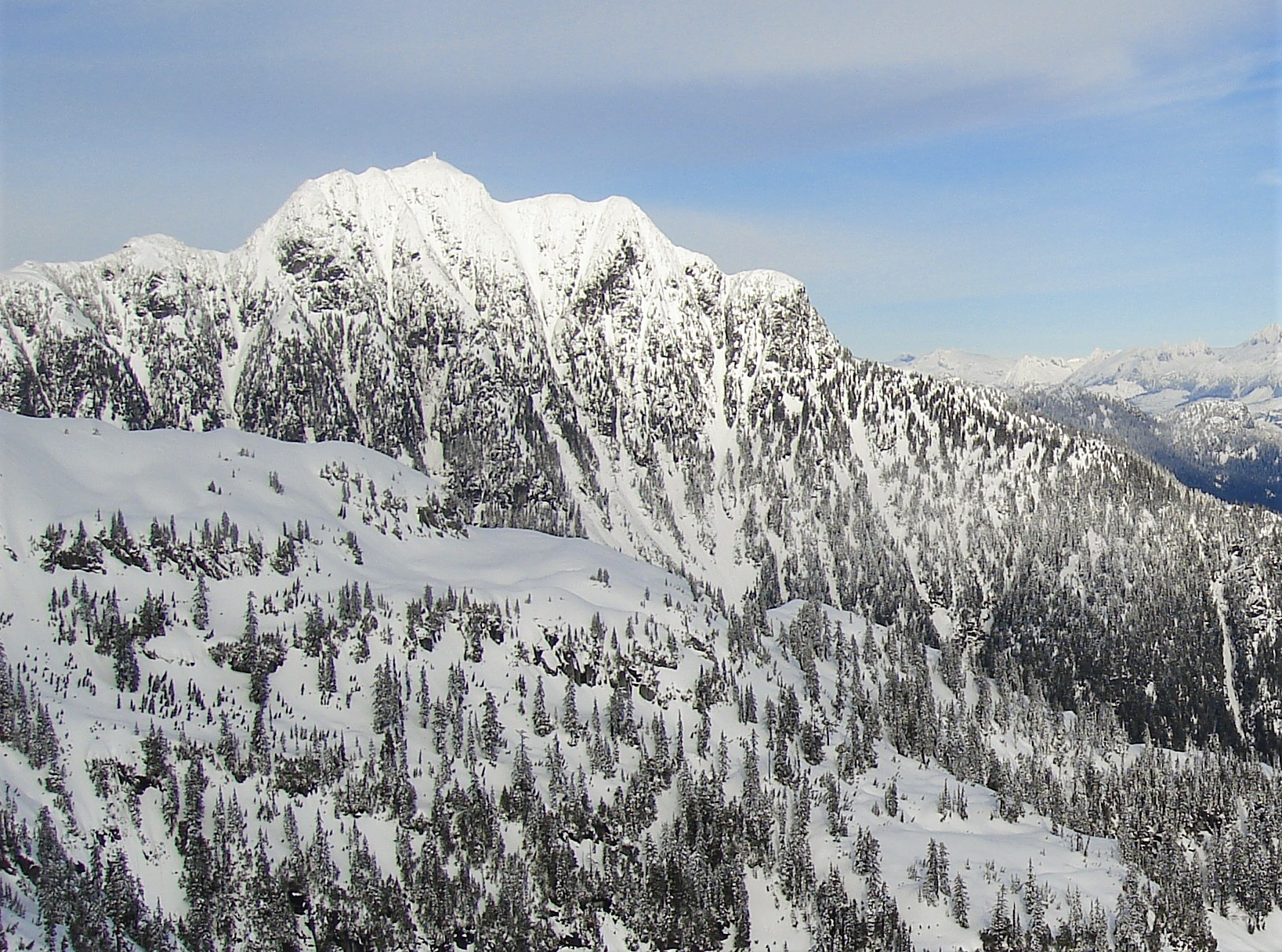
South aspect in winter, seen from Coliseum Mountain

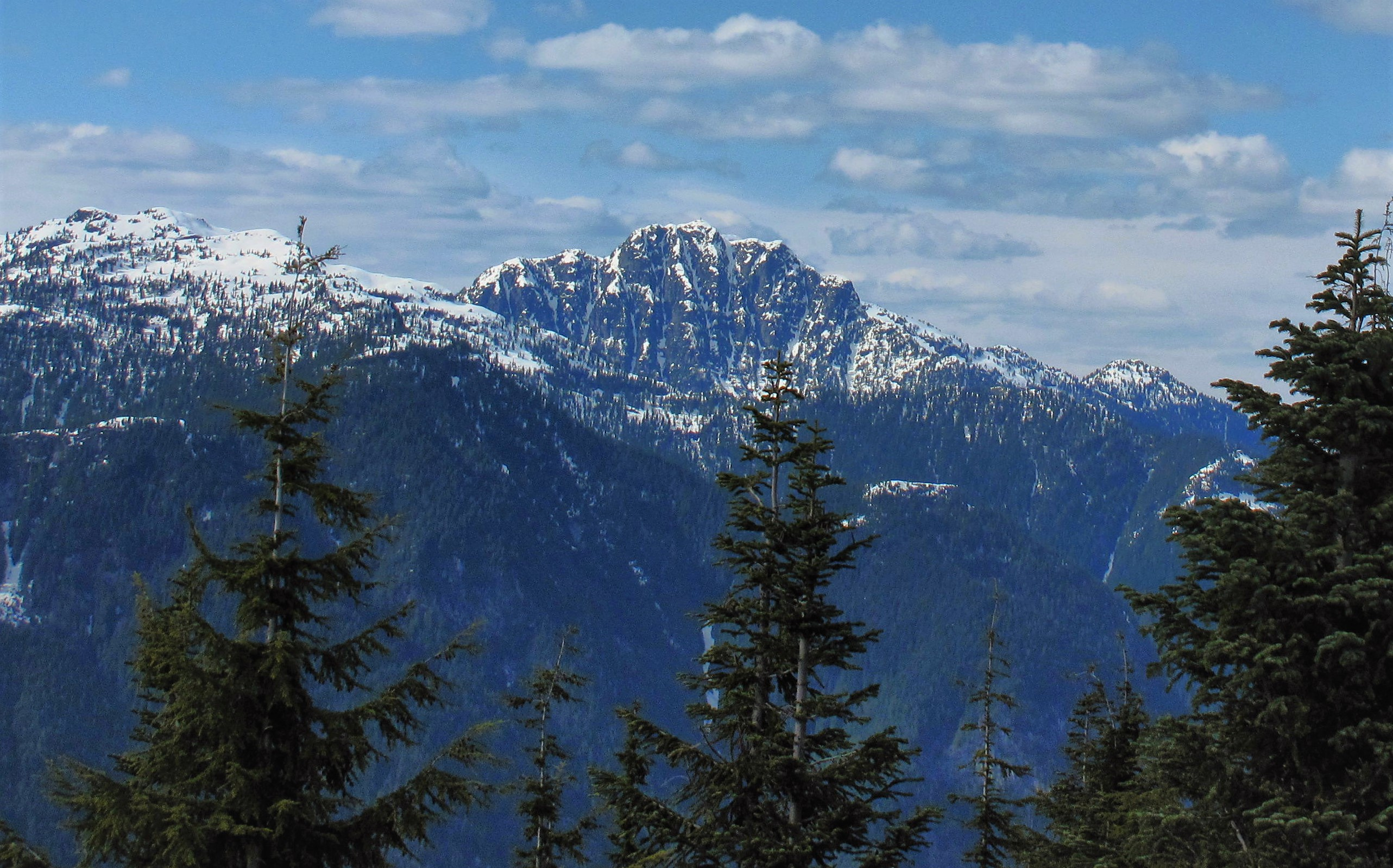
Cathedral Mountain

== See also ==
- Geography of British Columbia
