= Britannia Range (Canada) =

Mountain range in British Columbia, Canada

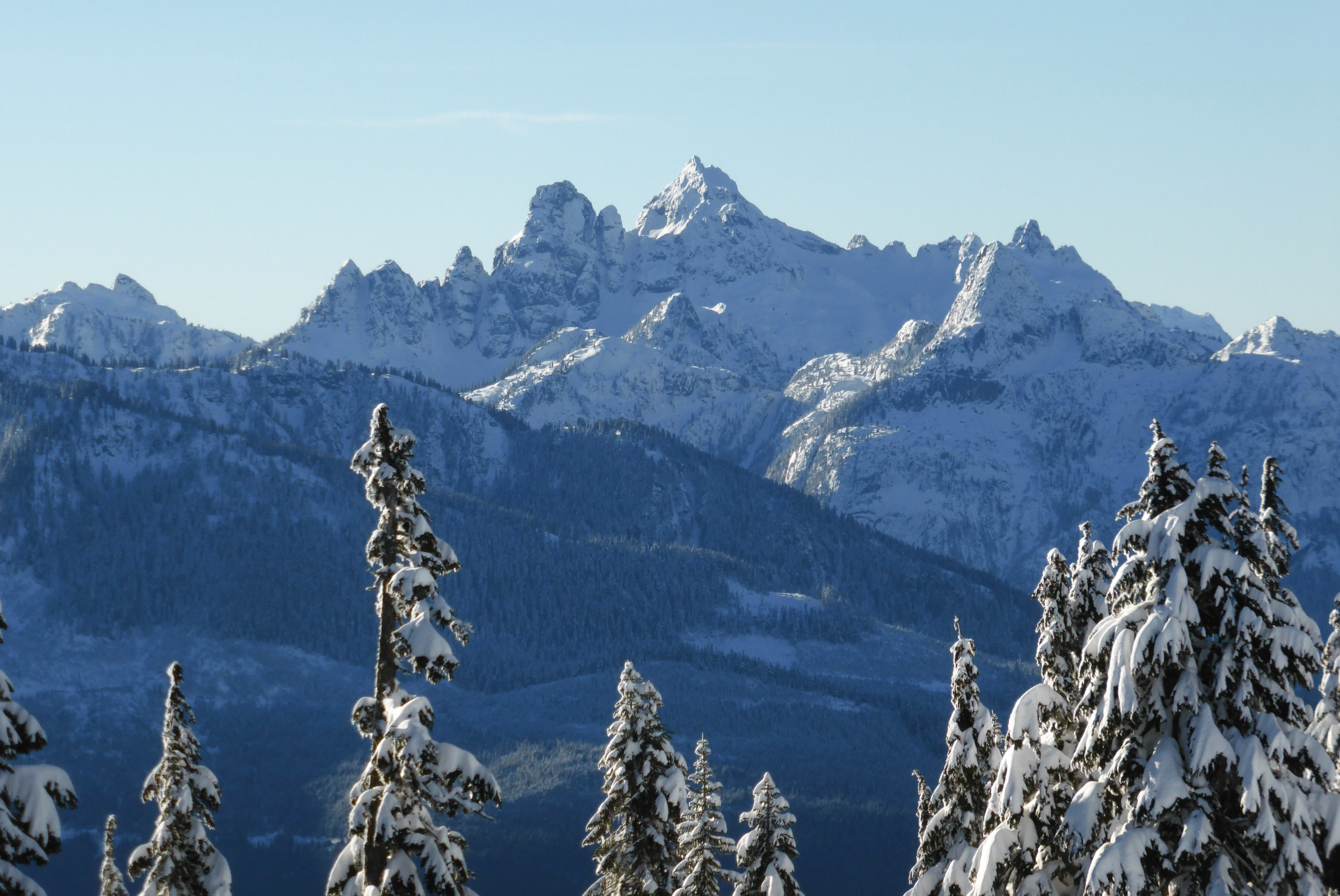
- Sky Pilot Mountain is highest point, centered. Immediately to left is Ledge Mountain. Mount Habrich below, right. Viewed from the north. Coast Mountains.

Highest point
- Peak: Sky Pilot Mountain
- Elevation: 2,031 m (6,663 ft)
- Coordinates: 49°38′05″N 123°05′11″W

Dimensions
- Area: 270 km^{2} (100 mi^{2})

Geography
- Location within British Columbia

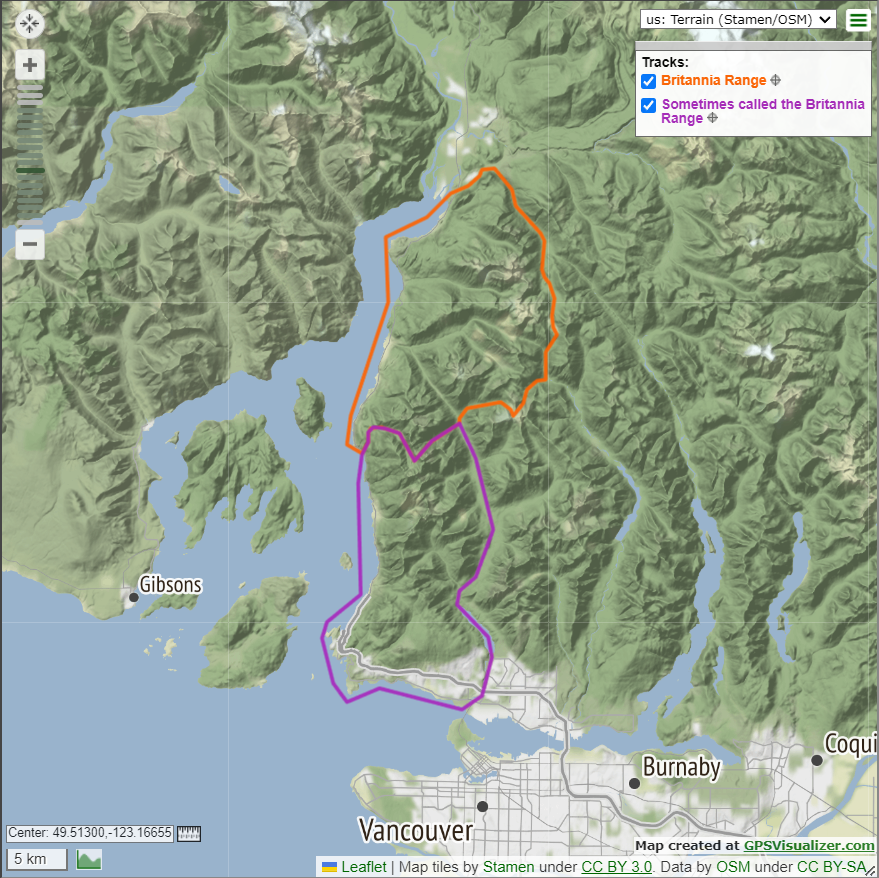
- Official (orange) and colloquial (purple) boundaries of the Britannia Range
- Country: Canada
- Province: British Columbia
- Range coordinates: 49°32′N 123°12′W
- Parent range: North Shore Mountains and Pacific Ranges
- Topo map: NTS 92G11 Squamish

The Britannia Range is a small mountain range of the Coast Mountains that runs along the eastern shore of Howe Sound just north of Vancouver, British Columbia, Canada. It is a subrange of the Pacific Ranges and often considered part of the North Shore Mountains. The range is bounded by the Howe Sound to the west, the Stawamus River to the north, Loch Lomond on the upper Seymour River to the east, and Deeks Lake to the south. However, some official maps extend the range further south of these boundaries and many local sources such as hiking guidebooks will often include all of the peaks along the Howe Sound between Deeks Lake and Cypress Mountain as part of the range.

The geology of the Britannia Range is different to the surrounding highly granitic North Shore Mountains due to the high prevalence of volcanic rock (such as at Watts Point volcanic centre) and sedimentary rock like sandstone and shale.

The range's name was conferred by Captain Richards in 1859 after the 100-gun HMS Britannia, which saw action at the Battle of St. Vincent, 1797 and the Battle of Trafalgar, 1805. Mountains within the range allude to British royalty, Mount Hanover and Mount Windsor for the respective dynasties. This is the source of the name of the town Britannia Beach.

The tallest mountain in the Britannia Range is Sky Pilot Mountain, a horn-shaped summit prominently visible to southbound traffic on BC Highway 99 on the descent from Whistler to Squamish.

== See also ==
- Fannin Range
