= List of provincial parks of Columbia-Shuswap Regional District =

The list of provincial parks of Columbia-Shuswap Regional District contains the 24 provincial parks located within this regional district of the province of British Columbia. These parks are administered by BC Parks under the jurisdiction of the Ministry of Environment and Climate Change Strategy.

The most visited provincial park of this region is Shuswap Lake Provincial Park with 107,051 total visitors and 74,170 overnight campers during the 2017/2018 season.

== List of parks ==
Park name	Classification	Coordinates	Size		Established	Remarks
Park name	Classification	Coordinates	ha	acres	Established	Remarks
Anstey-Hunakwa Provincial Park	Provincial Park	51°08′30″N 118°54′54″W	6,852	16,930	2004	
Arrow Lakes Provincial Park	Provincial Park	50°38′15″N 117°55′30″W	114	280	1981	
Blanket Creek Provincial Park	Provincial Park	50°50′00″N 118°04′59″W	318	790	1982	Protects a historic homestead and Sutherland Falls.
Bugaboo Provincial Park	Provincial Park	50°48′00″N 116°49′01″W	13,646.6	33,721	1969	
Burges James Gadsden Provincial Park	Provincial Park	51°24′N 117°03′W	404	1,000	1965	Protects Moberly Marsh of the Columbia Wetlands.
Cinnemousun Narrows Provincial Park	Provincial Park	50°59′50″N 119°01′01″W	176	430	1956	Protects Cinnemousun Narrows.
Cummins Lakes Provincial Park	Provincial Park; Protected Area	52°06′N 118°03′W	21,988.5	54,335	2000	
Eagle River Provincial Park	Provincial Park	50°59′N 118°41′W	454	1,120	2008	
English Lake Provincial Park	Provincial Park	50°55′05″N 118°19′55″W	337	830	2004	
Hamber Provincial Park	Provincial Park	52°22′05″N 117°51′58″W	25,137	62,110	1941	Part of the Canadian Rocky Mountain Parks World Heritage Site.
Herald Provincial Park	Provincial Park	50°47′00″N 119°12′00″W	79.1	195	1975	
Kingfisher Creek Provincial Park	Provincial Park; Ecological Reserve	50°48′19″N 118°46′55″W	1,935	4,780	2001	
Marl Creek Provincial Park	Provincial Park	51°30′N 117°12′W	169	420	1961	Protects the confluence of Waitabit Creek and the Columbia River.
Martha Creek Provincial Park	Provincial Park	51°08′30″N 118°12′00″W	71	180	1993	
Mount Griffin Provincial Park	Provincial Park	50°55′59″N 118°34′08″W	1,758	4,340	2001	
Pukeashun Provincial Park	Provincial Park	51°12′17″N 119°14′10″W	1,779	4,400	?	
Shuswap Lake Marine Provincial Park	Marine Provincial Park	51°01′20″N 119°01′44″W	896	2,210	1980	Protects 23 small sites located around the perimeter of Shuswap Lake.
Shuswap Lake Provincial Park	Provincial Park	50°54′00″N 119°25′59″W	149	370	1956	
Silver Beach Provincial Park	Provincial Park	51°14′25″N 118°57′22″W	130	320	1969	Protects the Seymour River Estuary.
Tsútswecw Provincial Park	Provincial Park	50°55′00″N 119°36′00″W	1,073	2,650	1989	
Upper Seymour River Provincial Park	Provincial Park	51°36′53″N 118°55′03″W	10,672	26,370	2001	
Victor Lake Provincial Park	Provincial Park	50°57′N 118°24′W	14.7	36	1961	
White Lake Provincial Park	Provincial Park	50°53′20″N 119°15′50″W	266	660	1965	
Yard Creek Provincial Park	Provincial Park	50°54′01″N 118°48′47″W	175	430	1956	

== Gallery ==
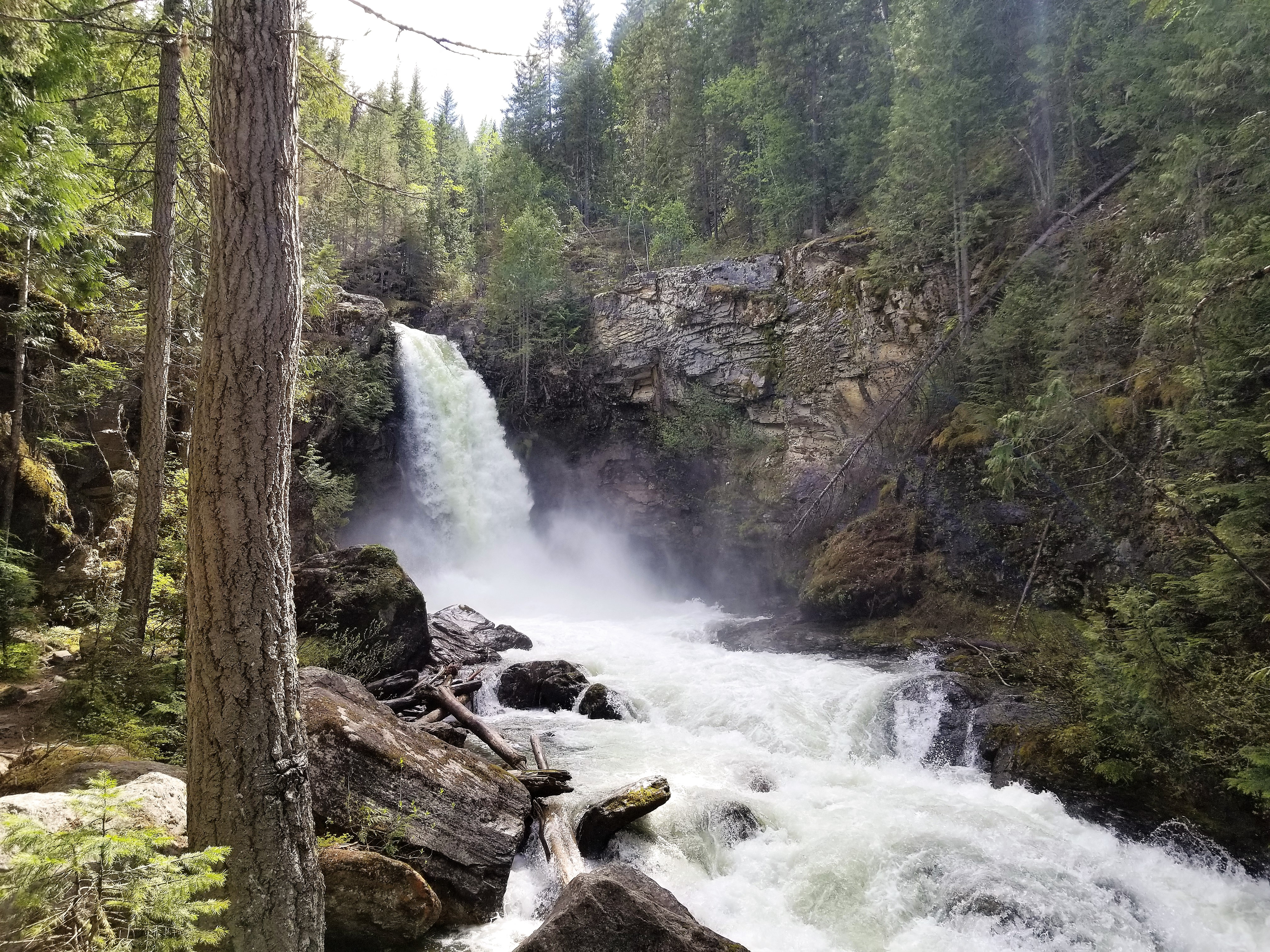
Blanket Creek Provincial Park

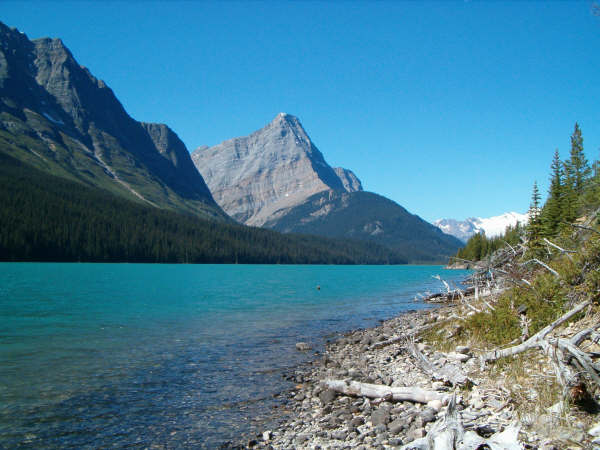
Hamber Provincial Park

Shuswap Lake Provincial Park

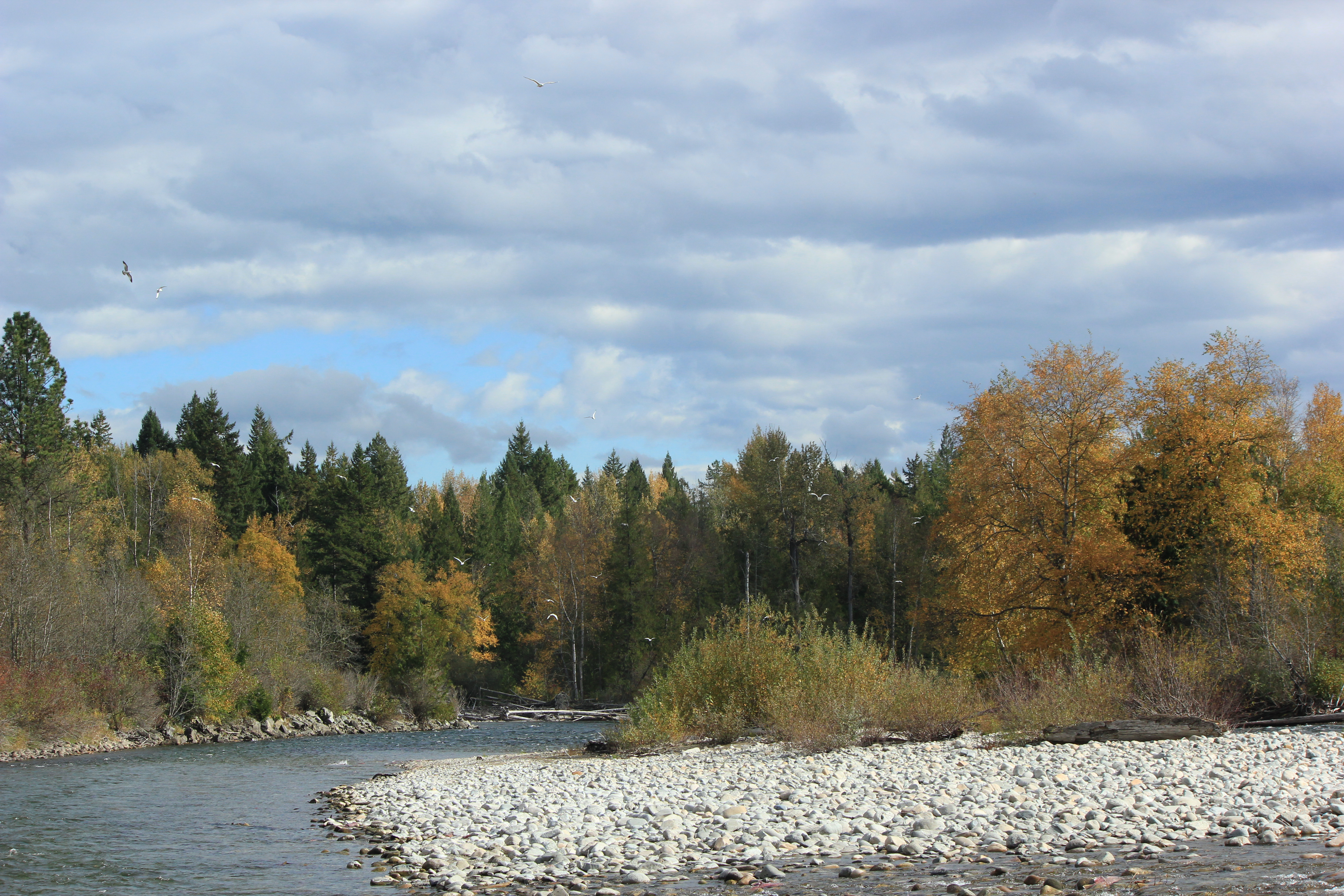
Tsútswecw Provincial Park
