= Fannin Range =

Mountain range in British Columbia, Canada

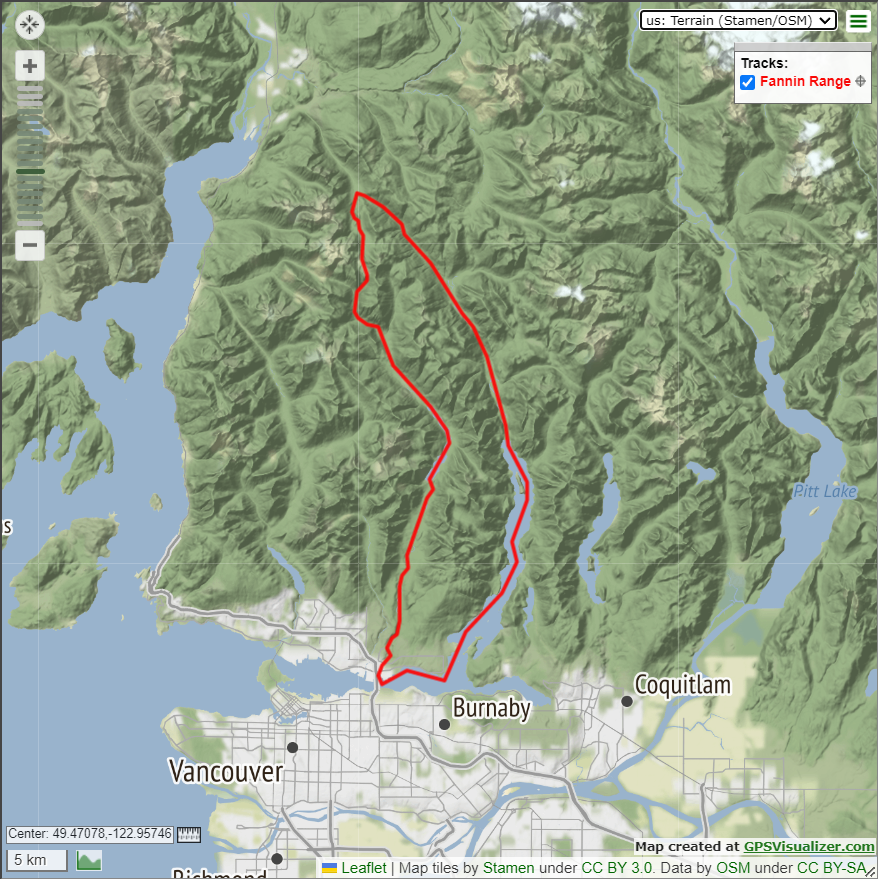
- Approximate boundaries of the Fannin Range in the Vancouver area

Highest point
- Peak: Mount Jukes
- Elevation: 1,574 m (5,164 ft)
- Coordinates: 49°34′10″N 122°58′39″W

Dimensions
- Area: 213 km^{2} (82 mi^{2})

Geography
- Location within British Columbia
- Country: Canada
- Province: British Columbia
- City: Vancouver
- Range coordinates: 49°29′00″N 122°55′25″W
- Parent range: North Shore Mountains and Pacific Ranges

The Fannin Range is a small mountain range in the Pacific Ranges of the Coast Mountains of British Columbia, Canada. Lying between the Seymour River and the glacial fjord Indian Arm, the range extends from the slopes of Mount Seymour on the Burrard Inlet to the district of North Vancouver more than 34 km (21 mi) north to the headwaters of the Indian River. It is named after the naturalist John Fannin It is commonly considered to be part of the North Shore Mountains.

== Recreation ==
The southern part of the range is extremely popular for outdoor recreation due to its proximity to Vancouver. In the summer, hiking, mountain biking, picnicking, and backcountry camping are popular activities. In the winter, the area is popular for snowshoeing, and for downhill, cross-country, and backcountry skiing. It contains multiple parks including:

- Mount Seymour Provincial Park
- Say Nuth Khaw Yum (Indian Arm) Provincial Park
- Lower Seymour Conservation Reserve
- Thwaytes Landing Regional Park

The northern range part of the range has few publicly accessible roads and trails and its peaks are typically only frequented by mountaineers. Its western drainage is off-limits to the public due to being within the Seymour River watershed.

== Mountains ==
The Fannin Range contains prominent mountains such as Mount Seymour (1,449 m (4,754 ft)), Mount Bishop (1,509 m (4,951 ft)) and Mount Elsay (1,419 m (4,656 ft)) that are trail-accessible from Mount Seymour Provincial Park or Lower Seymour Conservation Reserve. Although Mount Bishop is commonly thought to be the tallest peak in the Fannin Range, the remote and inaccessible Mount Jukes (1,574 m (5,164 ft)) in the north of the range is 65 m (213 ft) taller.

== Gallery ==
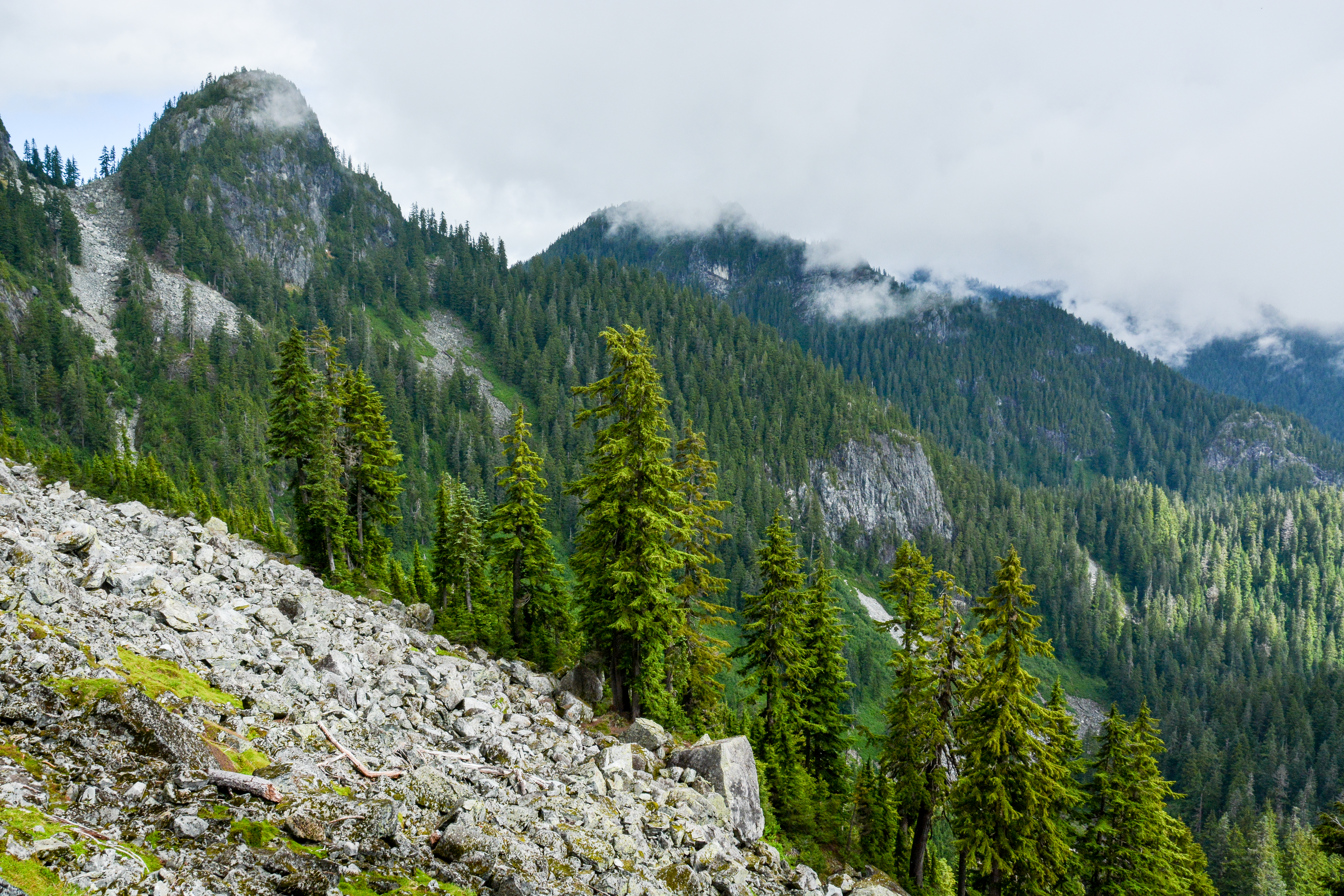
Runner Peak and Mount Elsay in the Fannin Range
