= Metro Vancouver watersheds =

Source region for municipal water in Metro Vancouver, Canada

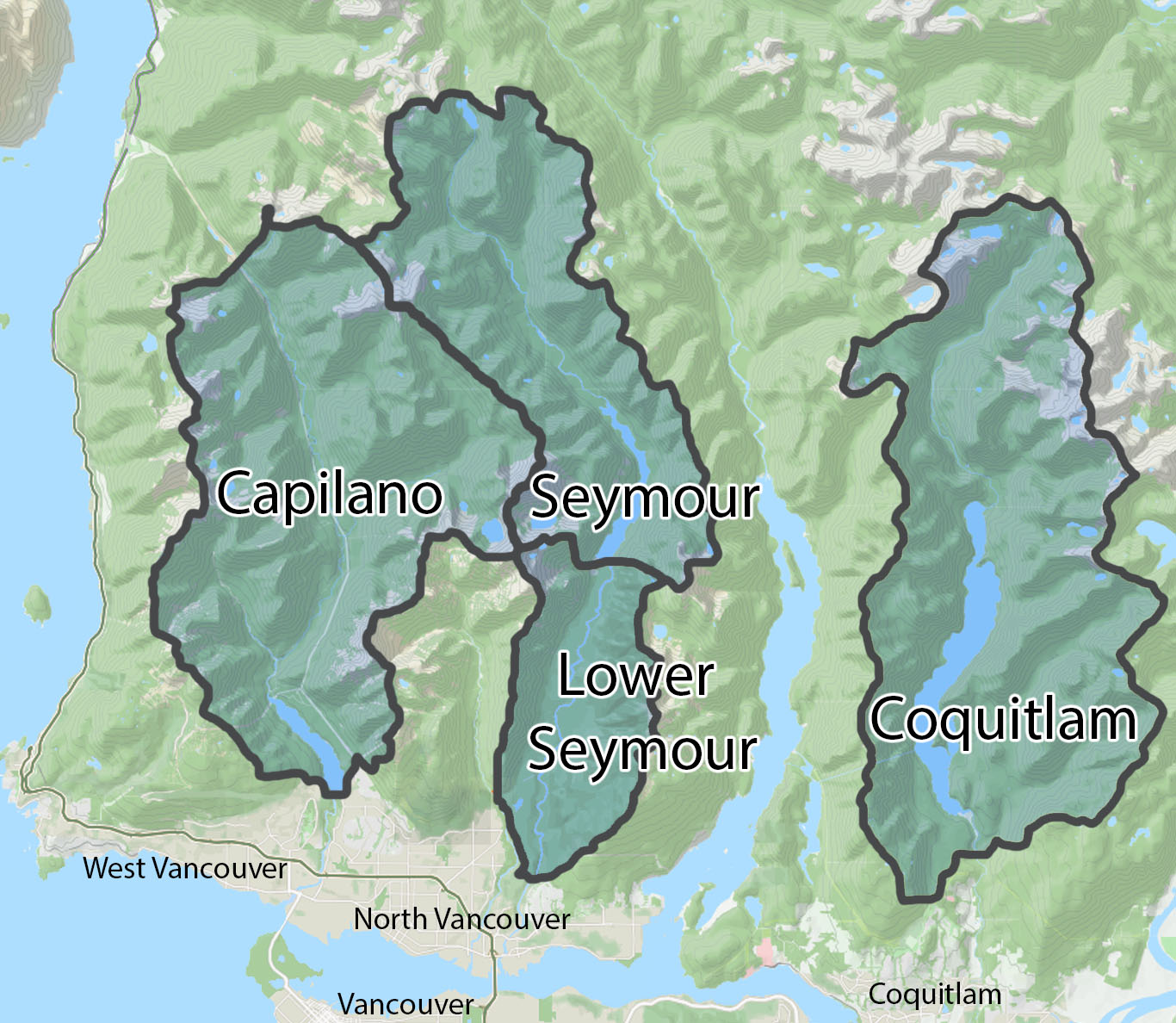
- Metro Vancouver watershed boundaries
- Location: Lower Mainland, British Columbia, Canada
- Nearest city: Vancouver
- Area: Capilano watershed: 19,545 ha (48,300 acres); Seymour watershed 12,735 ha (31,470 acres); Coquitlam watershed 20,461 ha (50,560 acres)
- Governing body: Metro Vancouver

The Metro Vancouver watersheds, also known as the Greater Vancouver watersheds, supply potable water to approximately 2.7 million residents in the Lower Mainland of British Columbia. They provide tap water to a land area covering more than 2,600 square kilometres (1,000 sq mi), serving a total of 21 member municipalities, one electoral district, and one treaty First Nation. From west to east, the watersheds are the Capilano (19,545 ha; 48,300 acres), the Seymour (12,375 ha; 30,580 acres), and the Coquitlam (20,461 ha; 50,560 acres). They are located in the North Shore Mountains and Coquitlam Mountain, respectively. Each watershed possesses a reservoir for water storage purposes, under the control of Metro Vancouver. The reservoirs are supplied by about 3.5 metres (11 ft) of rain and 4.5 metres (15 ft) of snowpack annually. Two additional off-catchment areas (Lower Seymour Conservation Reserve and Or Creek watershed) under control of Metro Vancouver contribute to the water supply. The watersheds have a long history of controversies surrounding logging, highway development, and salmon run conservation.

== History ==
=== Establishment ===
The Vancouver area began to grow rapidly in the late 1880s. In April 1886, two entities, the Vancouver Water Works Company and the Coquitlam Water Works Company, were established with the goal of finding and providing good, reliable sources of drinking water for the growing population.

==== Seymour and Capilano watersheds ====
In 1887, the Capilano River was selected as the source of water supply for the City of Vancouver. An intake pipe was constructed 11 kilometres (6.8 mi) upstream of the mouth of the river, and a pipeline carried this water across the First Narrows of Burrard Inlet and into the City of Vancouver.

As the population in the Lower Mainland of Vancouver continued to grow, it became clear that another source of water was needed to meet growing demands. In 1905, Vancouver Mayor Frederick Buscombe identified the Seymour River as a valuable water resource. Recognizing that the surrounding watershed land should be protected from logging and mining activities, the B.C. government obtained a 999-year lease to designate the Capilano and the Seymour as a watershed reserve for water supply purposes in 1905 and 1906, respectively. Lands purchased prior to the reserve agreement remained under private ownership, and established mining and timber claims were considered valid and were still practiced after 1905 and 1906. In 1908, the first intake in the Seymour River was constructed. It was in the form of a wooden fir stave pipe and was situated 11 kilometres (6.8 mi) from the mouth of the river, and at an elevation of 140 metres (460 ft). A second intake, 600 metres (2,000 ft) north of the first one, was built in 1913. The pipeline supplied water to residents of North Vancouver, and later carried water underneath the Second Narrows Bridge to residents of Vancouver, Burnaby and Richmond. In 1927, the wooden pipe was replaced by a steel pipe. In 1928, a small dam was built six kilometers north of the Seymour intake. This dam, known as the Seymour Falls Dam, resulted in filling of a 180-acre reservoir. The dam and the reservoir were expanded in 1961 to the size they are found today.

==== Coquitlam watershed ====
From 1892 onwards, Coquitlam Lake was the domestic water supply for the City of New Westminster. On October 18, 1902, the Vancouver Power Company (VPC) took over control of providing New Westminster City with long-term potable water from the Coquitlam Water Works Company. The intake for New Westminster's water supply was originally located at the lower end of Coquitlam Lake, above the location of the first dam. A new intake location in the western half of the dam was installed in 1905. In August 1909, the federal government granted the VPC rights to the water within the Coquitlam reservoir and almost the entire Coquitlam run-off.

=== Logging ===
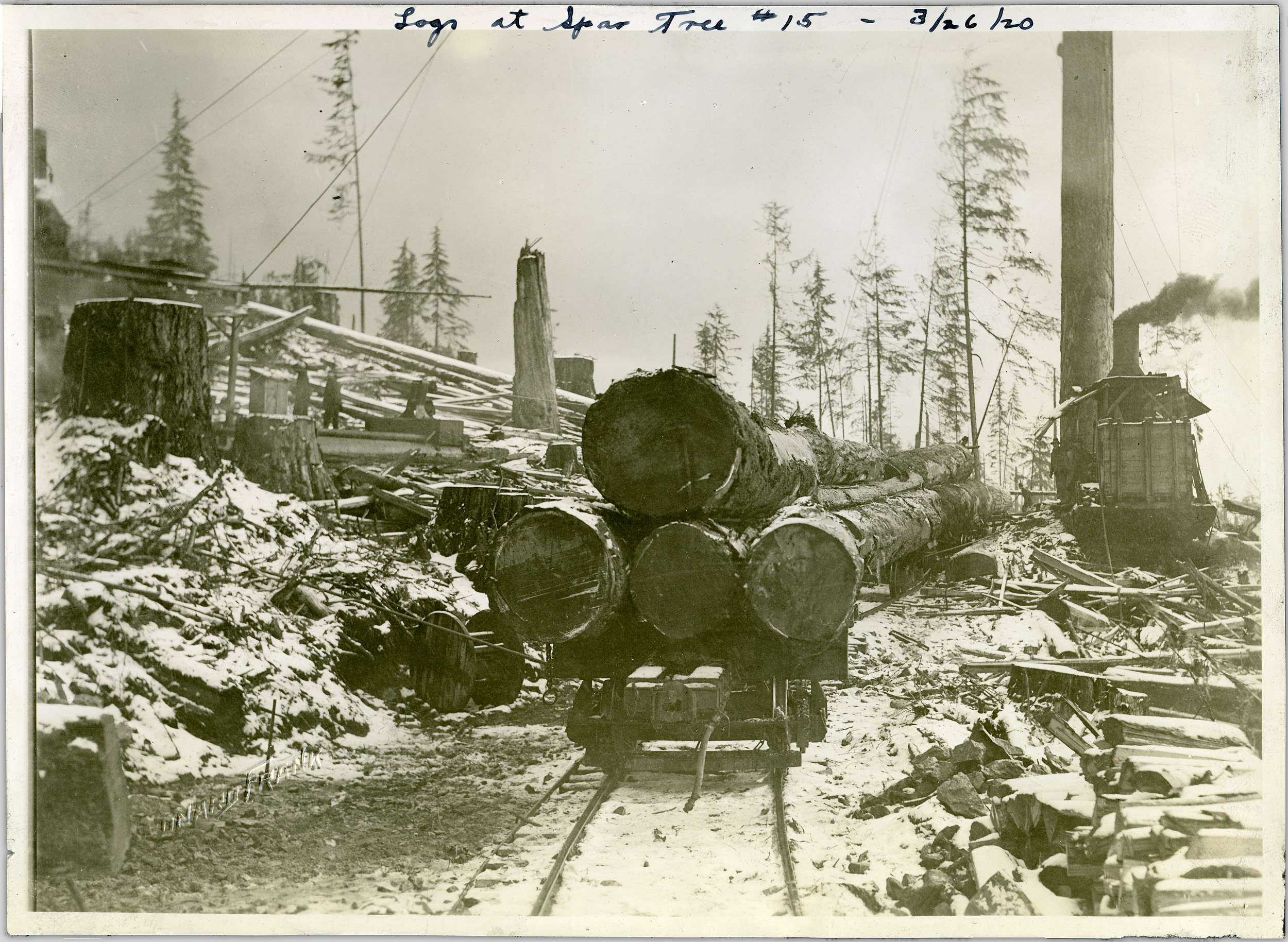
Capilano Timber Company logging operations in 1919

==== Early logging: 1918–1931 ====
From 1918 to 1931, the Seattle owned Capilano Timber Company logged an estimated 3,200 hectares (7,900 acres) of old-growth forest in the Capilano watershed. Capilano Timber Company obtained timber leases prior to the decision in 1905 to prevent any more land in the Capilano watershed to be privately purchased. In 1916, residents were notified of the railway complex being planned for logging operations, and by 1918 clear cutting in the Capilano watershed had begun. Watershed observers, hired by the City of Vancouver to investigate the logging activity in the Capilano, noted that logging was occurring at high elevations (up to 750 m / 2,460 ft), on steep slopes, and at the mouths of tributaries to Capilano River. Residents and politicians in Vancouver became very concerned that the quality of the future water supply was at risk from logging activities. In addition to logging, fires were also a concern. Thirty-seven fires caused by logging practices occurred in the Capilano watershed during the occupation of the Capilano Timber Company. One of these fires burned an estimated 3,213 acres in the watershed.

In 1922, Ernest Cleveland, the provincial Comptroller of Water Rights and Consulting Engineer of the Provincial Lands Department of BC, submitted a report recommending that the watersheds be under the complete control of those responsible for the water supply. He asserted that land in the watersheds should no longer be leased for the purpose of timber extraction. There was a great amount of debate over this idea. Following Cleveland's recommendation, the provincial minister of lands, T.D. Pattullo granted an additional 170 acres of land above the city's water intake to Capilano Timber Company. This action was met with backlash from citizens and elected officials and was eventually cancelled by British Columbia Premier John Oliver. In 1924, University of British Columbia professor and botanist John Davidson addressed the Vancouver Natural History Society to express concern for effects of clear-cut logging on water supply quality in the Capilano watershed. Pattullo responded with an article in the newspaper disagreeing with Davidson, and the debate continued in a very public and intense fashion.

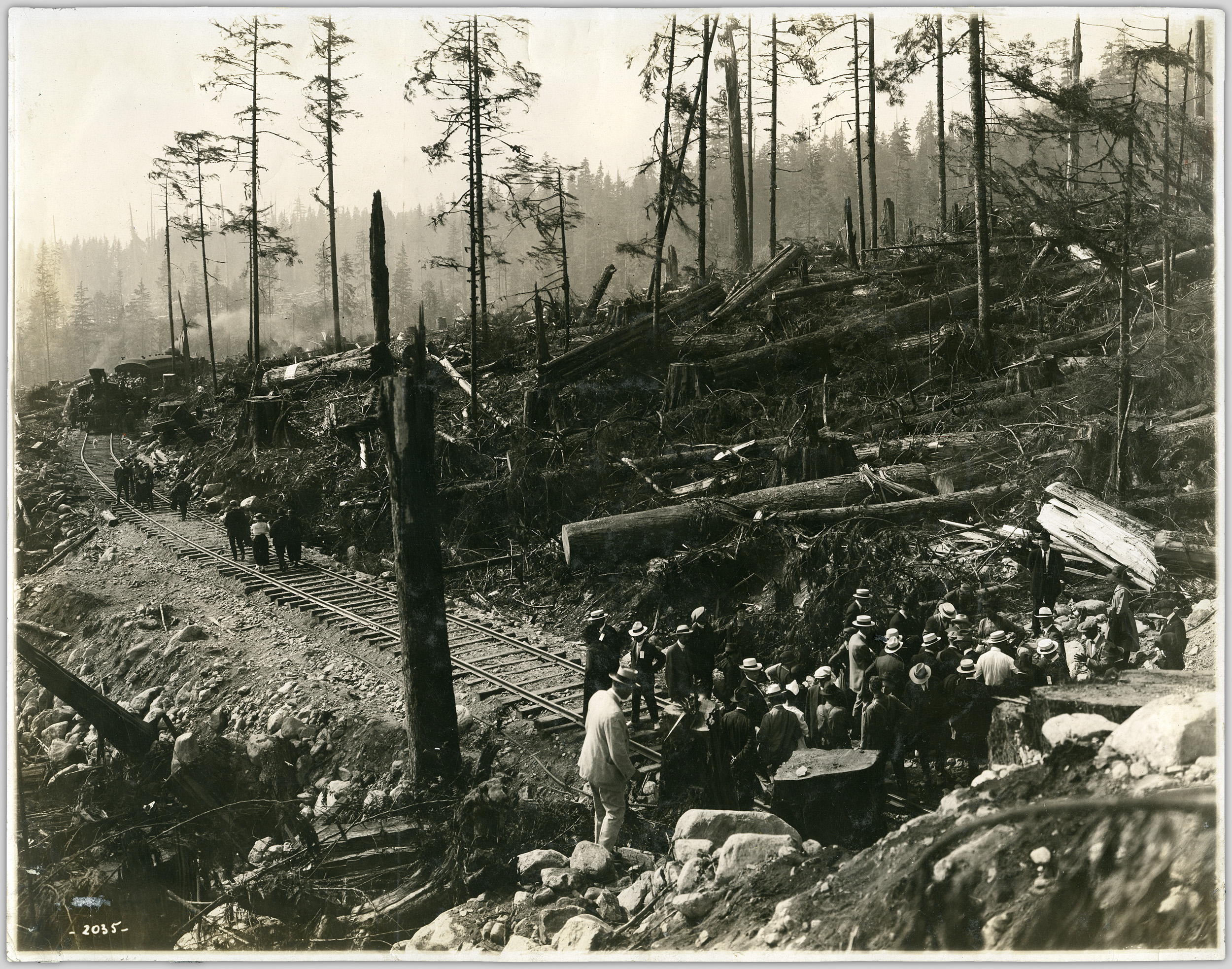
Tour of logging area in Capilano watershed 1919

On February 3, 1926, the Greater Vancouver Water District (GVWD) was officially formed with Ernest Cleveland as its Commissioner. In 1927, the GVWD obtained a 999-year lease from the provincial government for all Crown land and timber in the Capilano and Seymour watersheds. The rental fee was one dollar per year, per watershed. The Capilano Timber Company abandoned its logging activities in the Capilano Watershed in 1931. The GVWD gradually bought out all logging companies in the Capilano watershed, and Capilano and Seymour were soon completely closed watersheds. In 1931, the GVWD gained title to the Coquitlam watershed, but a 999-year lease to the Coquitlam was not granted by the provincial government until 1942.

==== Logging for watershed protection and expansion ====
Throughout the 1930s, 1940s, and 1950s the GVWD was persistent in its position to keep logging out of the watersheds. Following Cleveland's death in 1952, many forestry companies began to push for logging of land in the watersheds for income. They argued that logging of mature forest was necessary for protection of the watersheds against forest fires, insect infestation, and old aged trees. However, near the end of the decade, the position of the GVWD on logging began to show signs of changing. On December 16, 1958, logging in the Seymour watershed began to clear land for the new Seymour dam reservoir. The GVRD hired Consolidated Services Ltd, consulting foresters and engineers, to direct operations. By the end of the project, 487 acres were cleared and a five-mile access road was built alongside the eastern portion of the Seymour Reservoir. The cleared logs were sold and brought in around $540,000. In 1960, the GVWD announced plans to continue building a road nine miles further north to the Loch Lomond reservoir in the Seymour watershed. In 1961, 316 acres of forest in the Seymour watershed were logged to prevent a wooly aphid infestation on Balsam tree species from spreading to the rest of the forest. As the decade continued, the case for logging in the watershed for the reasons of protection began to strengthen. In 1967, the 1927 GVWD lease agreement (known as the Amending Indenture) with the provincial government was changed to now allow for building of roads and logging of old-growth forests in all three watersheds. The timber on the watershed land was to be managed on a sustained yield basis for the purpose of developing, protecting and improving the water-yielding characteristics of the land.

In the Seymour and Coquitlam watersheds, there were no roads above the water intakes before 1960. In the Capilano watershed, only a service road to B.C. Hydro transmission lines was present. From 1961 to 1992, over 300 kilometres (190 mi) of logging road were constructed in the three watersheds. These roads were built through old-growth forests, across steep mountain slopes, and alongside and through creeks. About 5,000 hectares (12,000 acres) in total of forest was logged as a result of roadbuilding and logging in the watersheds. The GVWD continued to insist that logging operations were enhancing and improving water quality despite contrary findings of studies in the areas of soil and forest hydrology.

==== The end of logging in the watersheds ====
In 1988, a public campaign by the Western Canada Wilderness Committee brought attention to the logging issues, and the GVWD conducted a public inquiry in 1991. Public advocacy groups including the Society Promoting Environmental Conservation, the Burke Mountain Naturalists, the Friends of the Watersheds, and the BC Tap Water Alliance made strong cases for halting logging activities. In 1999, the GVWD resolved to end all logging activity in the Greater Vancouver watersheds. The 1967 Amending Indenture was cancelled on February 8, 2002. A promise to deactivate the logging roads in the watersheds was made.

==== Summary of watershed logging ====
	Capilano watershed	Seymour Watershed	Coquitlam Watershed
Early Logging (above water supply intake)	1918–1931: 3,200 ha (7,900 acres)	No logging prior to 1962	No logging prior to 1972
Recent Logging	1964–1994: 1,250 ha (3,100 acres)	1962–1992: 1,300 ha (3,200 acres)	1972–1993: 1,400 ha (3,500 acres)
Roads built (approximate)	1964–1992: 100 km (62 mi)	1961–1992: 100 km (62 mi)	1972–1992: 100 km (62 mi)

=== Capilano Highway debate ===
The idea of a public motor highway passing through the Capilano watershed to connect North Vancouver to Squamish and Garibaldi park was first suggested by J.W. Weart, chairman of the Garibaldi Park Board, in 1929. A campaign for this highway was maintained by the Howe Sound Highway Committee (HSHC) from 1950 to 1954. At this time, the only transport from Vancouver to the Squamish area was by ferry. The proposed route for the highway would be along transmission line access roads in the Capilano watershed, eventually connecting with logging roads in the Furry Creek watershed. Even after the death of their leader Ernest Cleveland in 1952, the GVWD maintained its position that the watersheds must be protected by isolation. In 1954, the HSHC accepted that their efforts for a highway would not be successful. In 1990 the topic was revisited by Rita Johnston, Social Credit Minister of Highways, when a rock slide cut off traffic on the Sea to Sky highway near Lions Bay.

=== Policy and land status summary ===
Date	Event
1905	BC Government obtains 999-year lease to reserve all Crown lands in Capilano for water supply purposes only
1906	BC Government obtains 999-year lease to reserve all Crown lands in Seymour for water supply purposes only
1910	Coquitlam watershed is protected from all logging
1926	Greater Vancouver Water District (GVRD) is formed with Ernest Cleveland as Commissioner
1927	999-year lease agreement of Crown land (known as the Indenture) in Seymour and Capilano watershed to protect against future logging and land alienation is made between GVWD & provincial government
1942	Coquitlam watershed included in the Indenture
1967	Indenture in amended by the GVWD to allow for logging in the watersheds by the district for water quality protection purposes. Known as the Amending Indenture
2002	GVRD Board recommends canceling Amending Indenture

== Reservoirs and catchment areas ==
=== Capilano ===
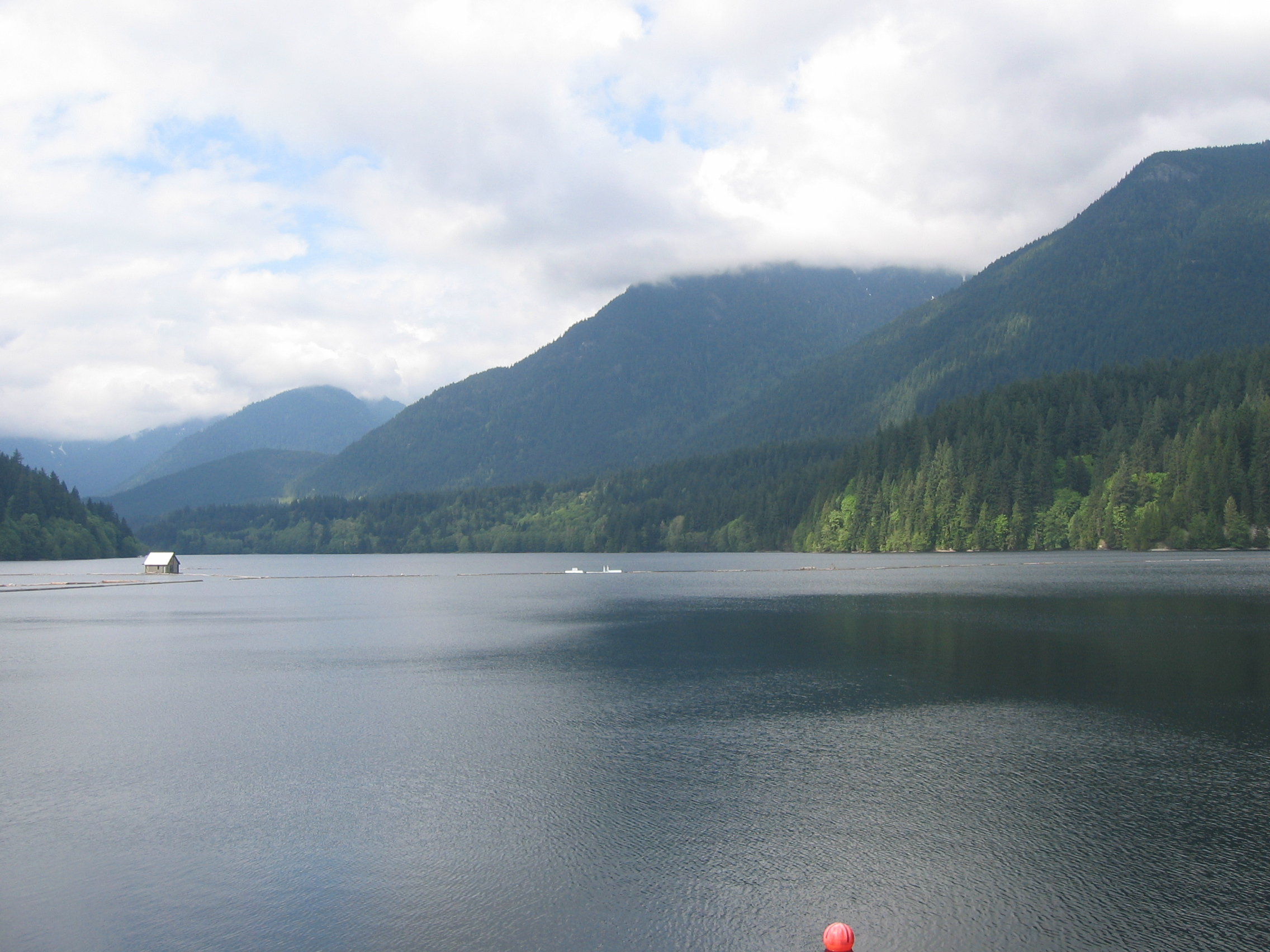
Capilano Lake

The Capilano watershed spans an area of 19,545 hectares (48,300 acres). It is west of Grouse Mountain and north of the popular tourist attraction, Capilano Suspension Bridge. Streams and creeks in this mountainous terrain drain into the Capilano River and are carried into Capilano Lake, a reservoir constructed in 1954 by the Greater Vancouver water district for the purpose of storing water. There are 11 main tributary streams that combine with the waters of the Capilano River as it makes its way from its origins at Capilano Mountain to the Capilano Reservoir. Andrews Creek, Daniels Creek, Dean Creek, Eastcap Creek, Enchantment Creek, Hanover Creek, Hesketh Creek, Hollsgate Creek and Sisters Creek are some of these tributaries. Capilano reservoir is 5.8 kilometres (3.6 mi) long, 800 metres (2,600 ft) wide, and 75 metres (246 ft) deep and can store 57.9 billion litres of water. It is retained at its south outflow behind the Cleveland Dam. The Capilano River continues south of the dam and flows out into the Burrard Inlet. Approximately 93% of the catchment for the Capilano River lies above the Cleveland Dam. Palisade Reservoir, an alpine lake in the Capilano watershed, serves as a secondary reservoir to augment flow in the Capilano River and improve water quality in the Capilano Reservoir during the dry season.

=== Seymour ===
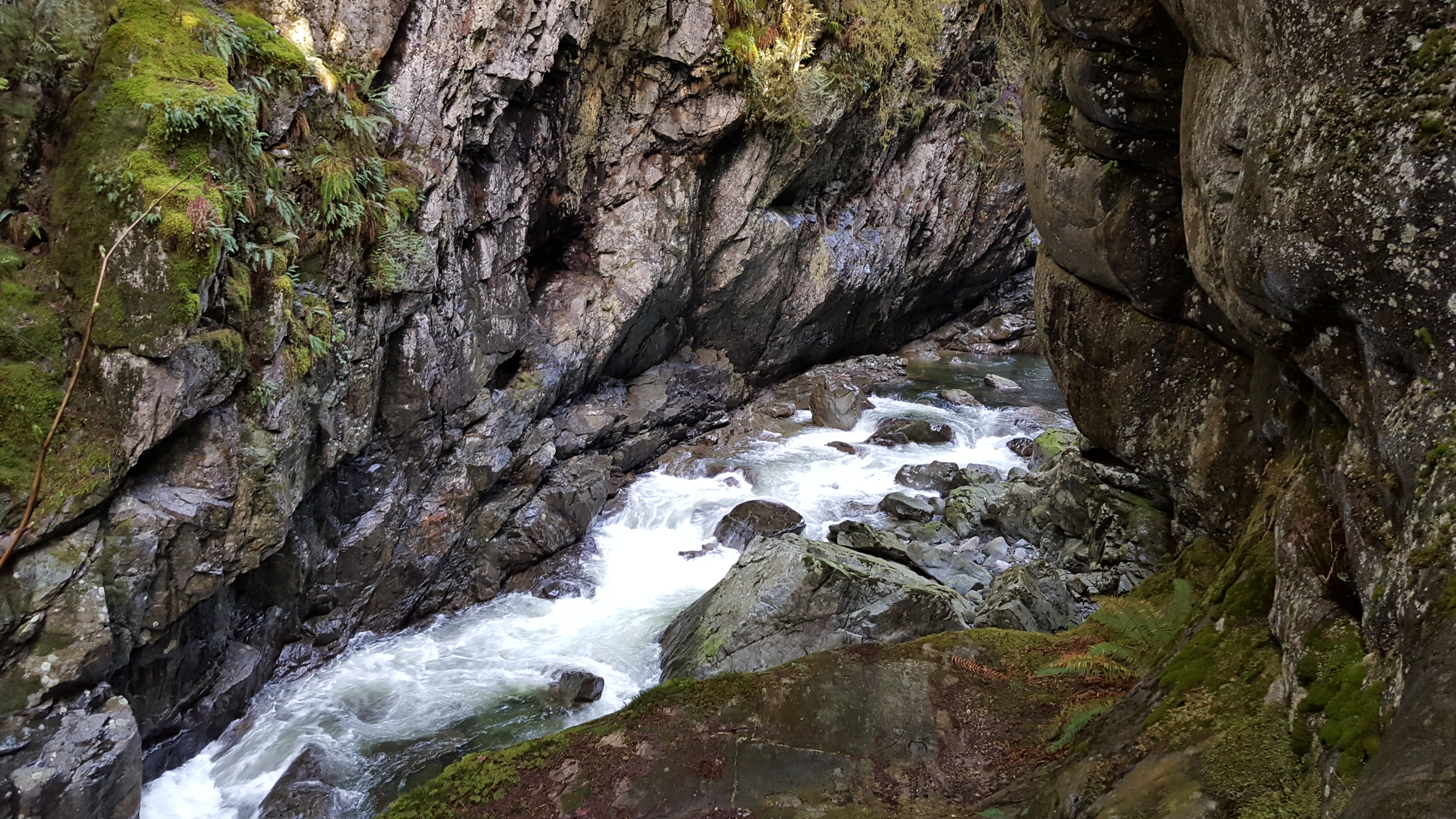
Seymour River

The Seymour watershed is a long narrow valley with an area of approximately 12,375 hectares (30,580 acres). It is east of Cathedral Mountain and northwest of the Fannin Range mountains and Mount Seymour Provincial Park. It is a maximum of 20 kilometres (12 mi) in the north–south direction and 7.5 kilometres (4.7 mi) in the west–east direction. The reservoir in the Seymour watershed is Seymour Lake. It has the capacity to hold 32 billion litres of water, and is usually full in the fall, winter and spring months. It receives inflow from tributaries such as Burwell Creek, Fannin Creek, and Gibbens Creek, but the majority of water enters as the Seymour River. Seymour Lake was originally a small reservoir created by the building of the Seymour Falls Dam on the Seymour River in 1928. When the dam was expanded in 1960, the Seymour Reservoir greatly expanded as well. It now stretches 6.5 kilometres (4.0 mi) in length, and between 200 metres (660 ft) and 750 metres (2,460 ft) wide. There are two alpine reservoirs, Loch Lomond and Burwell Lake, that can be drawn upon in the dry season. The Seymour River originates 20 kilometres (12 mi) above the Seymour Falls Dam, and receives inflow from tributaries such as Sheba Creek, Balfour Creek, and Orchid Creek as it makes its way towards Seymour Lake. Seymour River continues for another 19 kilometres (12 mi) below the dam before emptying into the Burrard Inlet, traveling a total distance of 39 kilometres (24 mi).

=== Coquitlam ===
The Coquitlam watershed is the largest of the three Metro Vancouver watersheds having an area of 20,461 hectares (50,560 acres). It is north of the city of Coquitlam, east of Indian Arm and Buntzen Lake, and west of Coquitlam Mountain. Coquitlam Lake, a natural lake, is the reservoir for the Coquitlam watershed. It receives inflow of water from the Coquitlam River whose headwaters are situated north at Disappointment Lake. Many creeks and streams drain into the Coquitlam River and Coquitlam Lake from the surrounding mountains. Coquitlam Lake was dammed in 1905 by the BC Electric Railway Company. The Coquitlam River extends south of the dam, passing through the Coquitlam Town Centre and eventually meeting the Fraser River.

== Human impacts and environmental concerns ==
=== Salmon in Coquitlam Lake ===
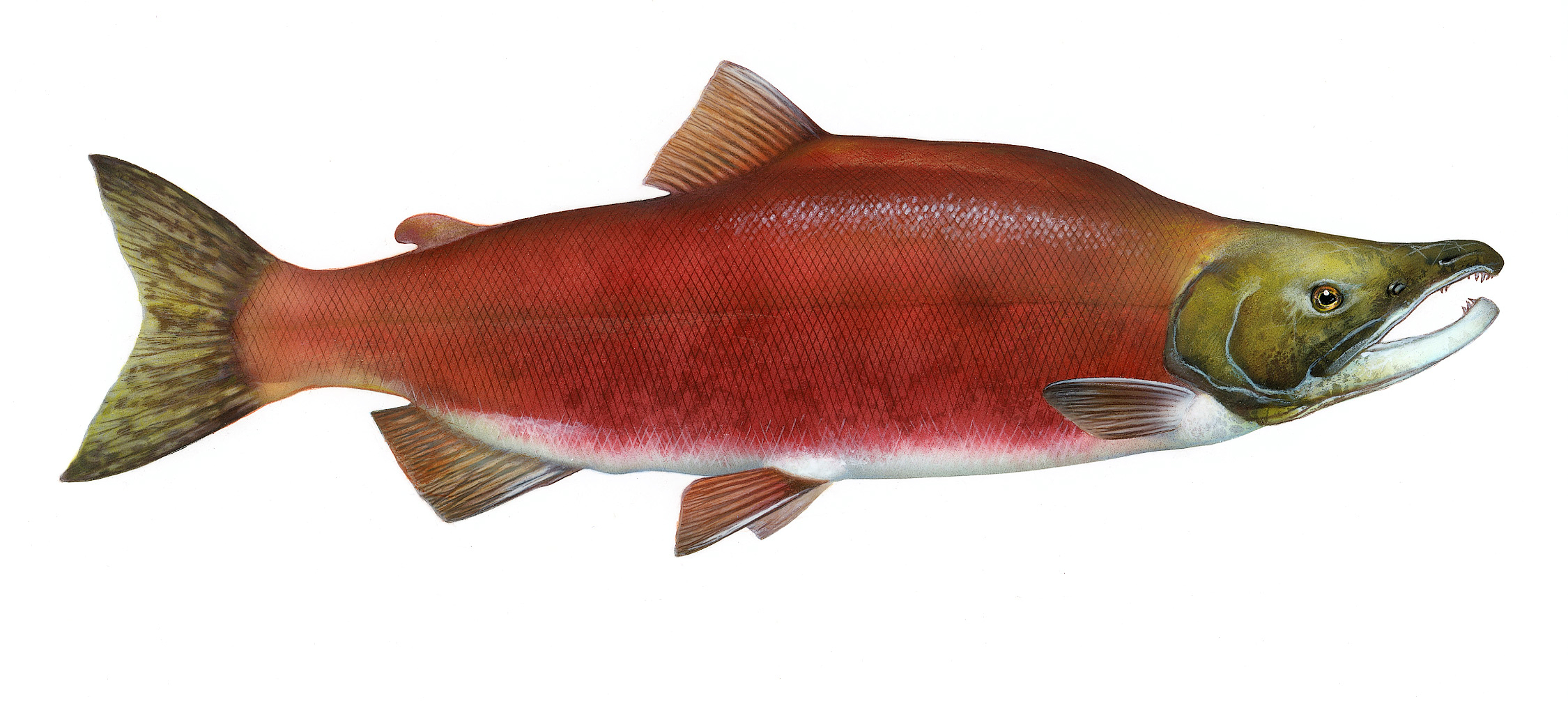
Male sockeye salmon in spawning phase

Coquitlam's original name, Kwikwetlem, translates to "red fish up the river" named after the plentiful sockeye salmon populations that historically spawned around Coquitlam Lake. The construction of the Coquitlam Dam raised concern about salmon migrational patterns for the four salmon species that frequently spawned in Coquitlam River: sockeye, coho, chum, and steelhead. Thousands of spawning salmon originally ran through Coquitlam Lake. The dam, used for the purposes of water supply and power generation, suspended salmon spawning in the upper part of the Coquitlam River. Areas in tributaries that the salmon used for spawning were destroyed when the dam raised the lake's water level by 5 feet. By 1913, sockeye salmon became locally extinct in the area. Over the past century, the other salmon populations (coho, chum, and steelhead) also suffered but they managed to persevere, even showing some signs of improvement in later years. However, the dam was not the only factor for the low salmon populations: overfishing in the ocean and the decline in the quality of their habitat also contributed to the decrease in their populations.

Vancouver Power Company and the City of New Westminster wanted to exterminate the salmon because they feared the salmon would ruin the quality of Coquitlam Lake's water supply. The City of New Westminster hired First Nations people, likely from the Kwikwetlem First Nation, to prevent water quality contamination by removing salmon carcasses from the water intake screens.

Since the early 1990s, the Department of Fisheries and Oceans had given priority status to protecting salmon spawning areas. The current Department of Fisheries and Oceans has spent years trying to protect the Coquitlam salmon run. The sockeye salmon returned to the Coquitlam River after 100 years and are now monitored to re-establish the run.

Individuals, volunteer groups, and municipalities have also made an effort to save the salmon run. Multiple plans, projects and reports have been put into place over the past two decades to understand and to increase salmon populations in the Coquitlam Watershed. In the 2011 Coquitlam/Buntzen Watershed Plan, the goal was to make an improved habitat conservation and restoration plan and to find actions that benefit all the salmon species. The priority salmon species included sockeye, coho, steelhead, pink, cutthroat, and chinook.

=== Erosion and landslides ===
Metro Vancouver's heavy rainfall creates the potential for erosion and landslides in the stream banks of the watersheds. Not only does this cause turbidity in Vancouver's drinking water, but it also poses a threat for salmon habitats, terrestrial ecosystems, and human-made infrastructure.

=== Climate change ===
In the summer of 2015, Metro Vancouver had a particularly dry summer and the three reservoirs experienced very low water levels due to a lack of precipitation. In the months of May, June, July, and August (before August 27), Vancouver experienced 4 mm (0.16 in), 11 mm (0.43 in), 21 mm (0.83 in), and 10 mm (0.39 in) of rain, respectively. When the reservoir levels reached a water level that was below its normal range in July, Stage 3 water restrictions were imposed for Metro Vancouver residents where watering lawns, washing cars outdoors, and refilling pools were banned.

== Public access ==
All Metro Vancouver watersheds are closed to the public. Public access to all watersheds is restricted in order to mitigate risks of water supply contamination from human disturbances, such as pollution and erosion. However, it is possible to participate in a registered watershed tour to gain access into the watersheds. In the summer, guided tours are taken by bus in the Capilano, Seymour and Coquitlam watersheds, and in the winter, tours are taken on snowshoe on Mount Seymour.
