= Mount Bishop (Fannin Range) =

Mountain in the country of Canada

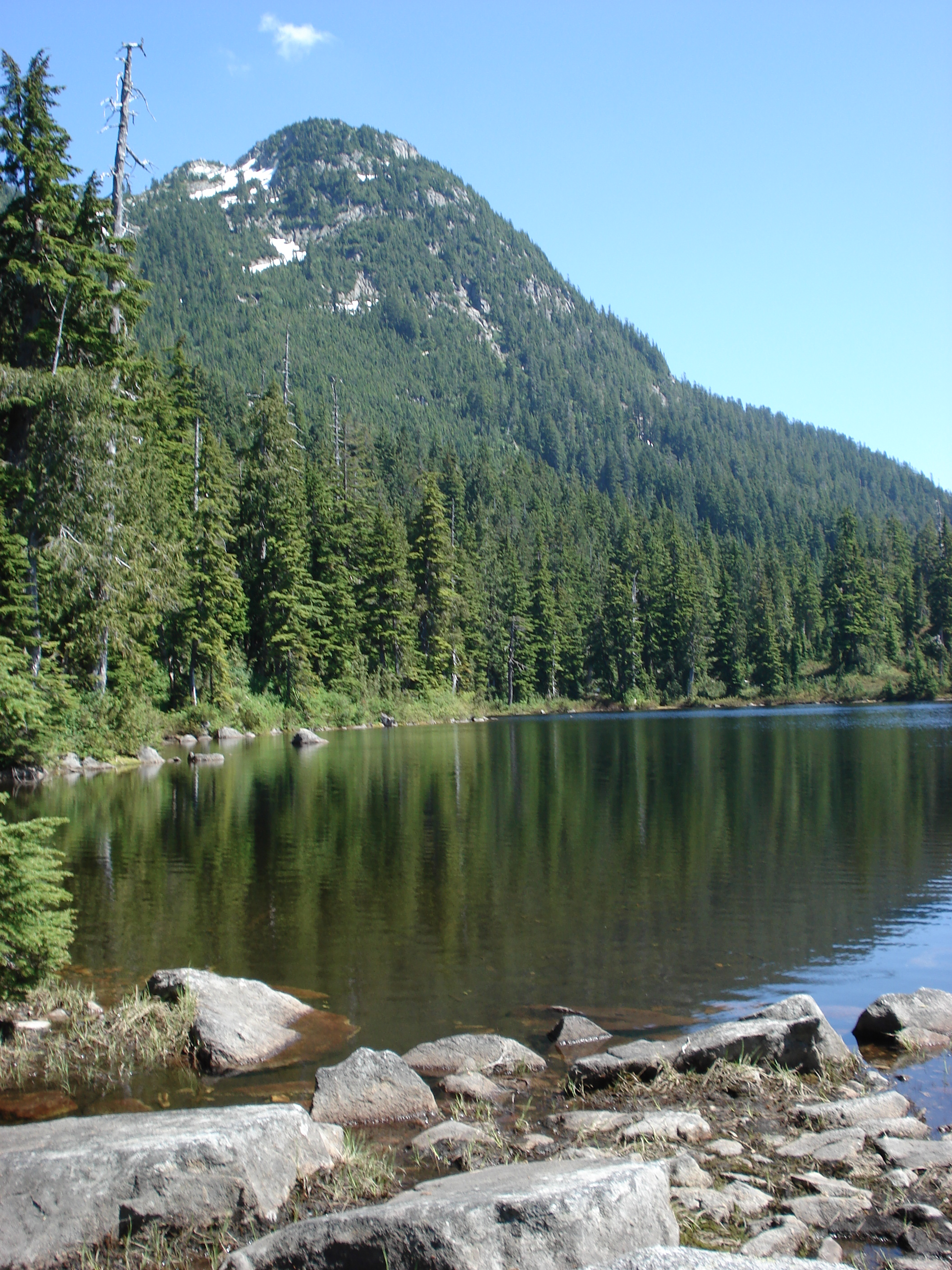
- Mount Bishop seen from Vicar Lake in the West

Highest point
- Elevation: 1,509 m (4,951 ft)
- Prominence: 613 m (2,011 ft)
- Coordinates: 49°25′49″N 122°55′38″W

Geography
- Location within Greater Vancouver Regional District Location within British Columbia
- Interactive map of Mount Bishop
- Location: British Columbia, Canada
- Parent range: Fannin Range, North Shore Mountains, Pacific Ranges
- Topo map: NTS 92G7 Port Coquitlam

Climbing
- First ascent: 1909 Fred Mills and large BCMC party
- Easiest route: Hike

Mount Bishop is a mountain located on the northern border of Mount Seymour Provincial Park in the District of North Vancouver, British Columbia. It is a part of the North Shore Mountains, rising from the shores of Indian Arm to a summit of 1,509 metres (4,951 ft). Mount Bishop is a rocky summit with bluffs and old growth on its lower slopes.

The mountain was named in honour of Joseph Charles Bishop, the first president of the British Columbia Mountaineering Club (BCMC), who died in 1913 after falling into a crevasse whilst climbing on Mount Baker.

== History ==
The first ascent of Mount Bishop was made in 1909 by a party of climbers from the British Columbia Mountaineering Club led by Fred Mills. The mountain was approached by boat to the top of Indian Arm, opposite Crocker Island, where the group camped overnight. In the morning they broke into two groups, the others climbing Mount Elsay (then known as Mount Jarrett) and headed up Bishop Creek. Among the Bishop party was Robert James Cromie, former owner of the Vancouver News-Advertiser (which became the Vancouver Sun). Upon reaching the summits of the two mountains at about 9.30am, the two parties of climbers called to each other.

== Hiking Routes ==
Although Mount Bishop is very close to Vancouver, it is seldom climbed. Hikers now approach this mountain from either the BCMC trail on the west shoulder of Mount Elsay, or the North Shore Rescue trail which runs up from the East side of the Seymour Dam. Both these trails bring one to Vicar Lake, then a steep climb brings the hiker up the west ridge of the mountain to the peak. The Peak is flanked closely by Mount Dickens on the North, with Elsay Lake and Mount Elsay to the South. This is rough backcountry and should be approached only with caution and experience.
