= Arrow Lake =

Arrow Lake may refer to:

== Places ==
- Arrow Lake (Flathead County, Montana), in Glacier National Park, US
- Arrow Lake (Western Australia), a lake in Western Australia
- Arrow Lakes, in British Columbia, Canada
  - Arrow Lakes Provincial Park
  - Arrow Lakes Hospital
  - Arrow Lakes Generating Station

== Other uses ==
- Arrow Lakes people, a Canadian First Nations people
- Arrow Lake (microprocessor), the code name for the Intel Core Ultra Series 2 processor line-up

== See also ==
- Lough Arrow, Ireland, a freshwater lake
