= John Fannin =

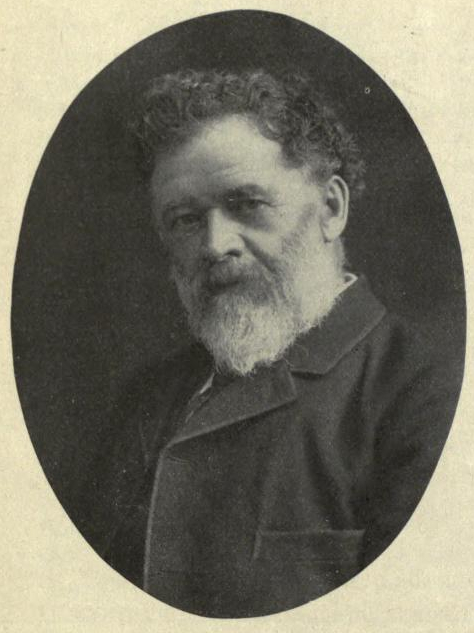
Portrait from Bird Lore (1903)

John Fannin (July 27, 1837 - June 20, 1904) was a Canadian naturalist, museum curator and explorer. A shoemaker who joined the gold rush and returned to become a taxidermist. He also surveyed parts of British Columbia and several places including Fannin Range, Fannin Lake, and Fannin Creek are named after him. Ovis fannini was named after him but it is now considered a color variant of the Dall sheep Ovis dalli.

Fannin was born in Kemptville, Ontario to William Fannin, tailor, and Eliza, who were of Irish origin. He may have taught at schools like his sister but little is known of his early life. He was a shoemaker for a while before joining the gold rush in British Columbia. He joined Thomas McMicking and they traveled overland through Fort Garry and Fort Edmonton to reach Kamloops through difficult terrain. Several men died and Fannin had to rely on his knowledge of the wilderness and survival skills to live with almost nothing. His attempts at mining and ranching in the Kamloops area were not successful and he tried his hand at taxidermy and also at writing.

From 1873 to 1899 Fannin worked for the British Columbia government as a contract surveyor to examine farming, mining, logging and settlements in the region. He also served as postmaster at Burrard Inlet (Vancouver) from 1882 and as a justice of the peace for New Westminster district in 1884. He became the first curator of the provincial museum at Victoria in 1886 and worked on natural history. He visited museums in Europe and the United States in 1896, after which time the museum grew much larger, with numerous exhibits and dioramas, into what is now known as the Royal British Columbia Museum. He retired in 1904 due to ill health and died a few months later in June.
