= Pukeashun Mountain =

Mountain in British Columbia, Canada

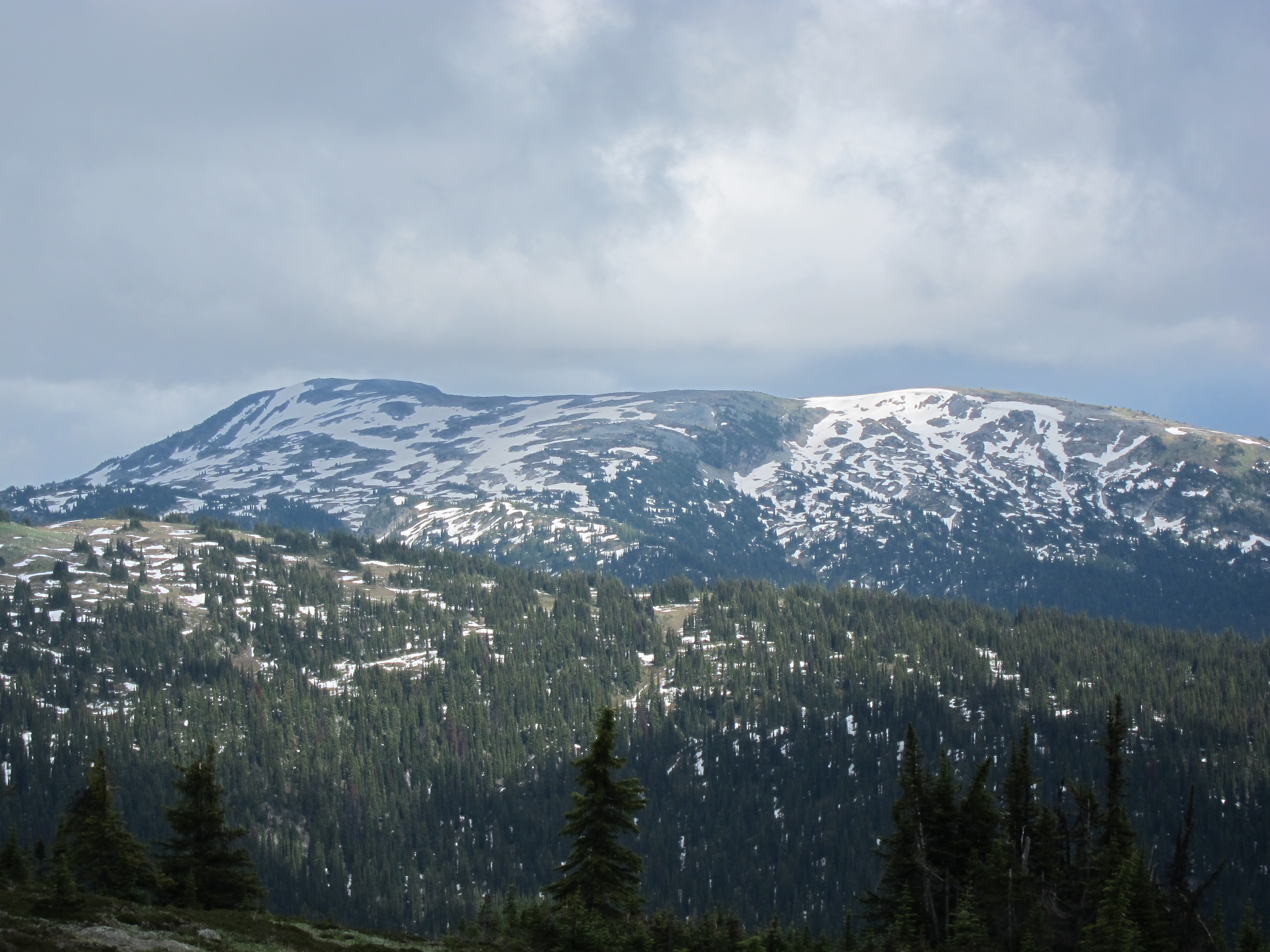
- Western flank of Pukeashun Mountain

Highest point
- Elevation: 2,301 m (7,549 ft)
- Prominence: 1,696 m (5,564 ft)
- Listing: Mountains of British Columbia; Canada prominent peaks 76th
- Coordinates: 51°12′17″N 119°14′07″W

Geography
- Location within British Columbia
- Country: Canada
- Province: British Columbia
- District: Kamloops Division Yale Land District
- Protected area: Pukeashun Provincial Park
- Parent range: Shuswap Highland; Monashee Mountains
- Topo map: NTS 82M3 Albas

Pukeashun Mountain is a peak in the Monashee Mountains in British Columbia, Canada. It is the highest point in the Adams Plateau, part of the Shuswap Highlands. The peak is the main feature of Pukeashun Provincial Park. Its name means "white rock" in the local Secwepemc language.

== See also ==
- List of Ultras of North America
