= Mount Elsay =

Mountain in the country of Canada

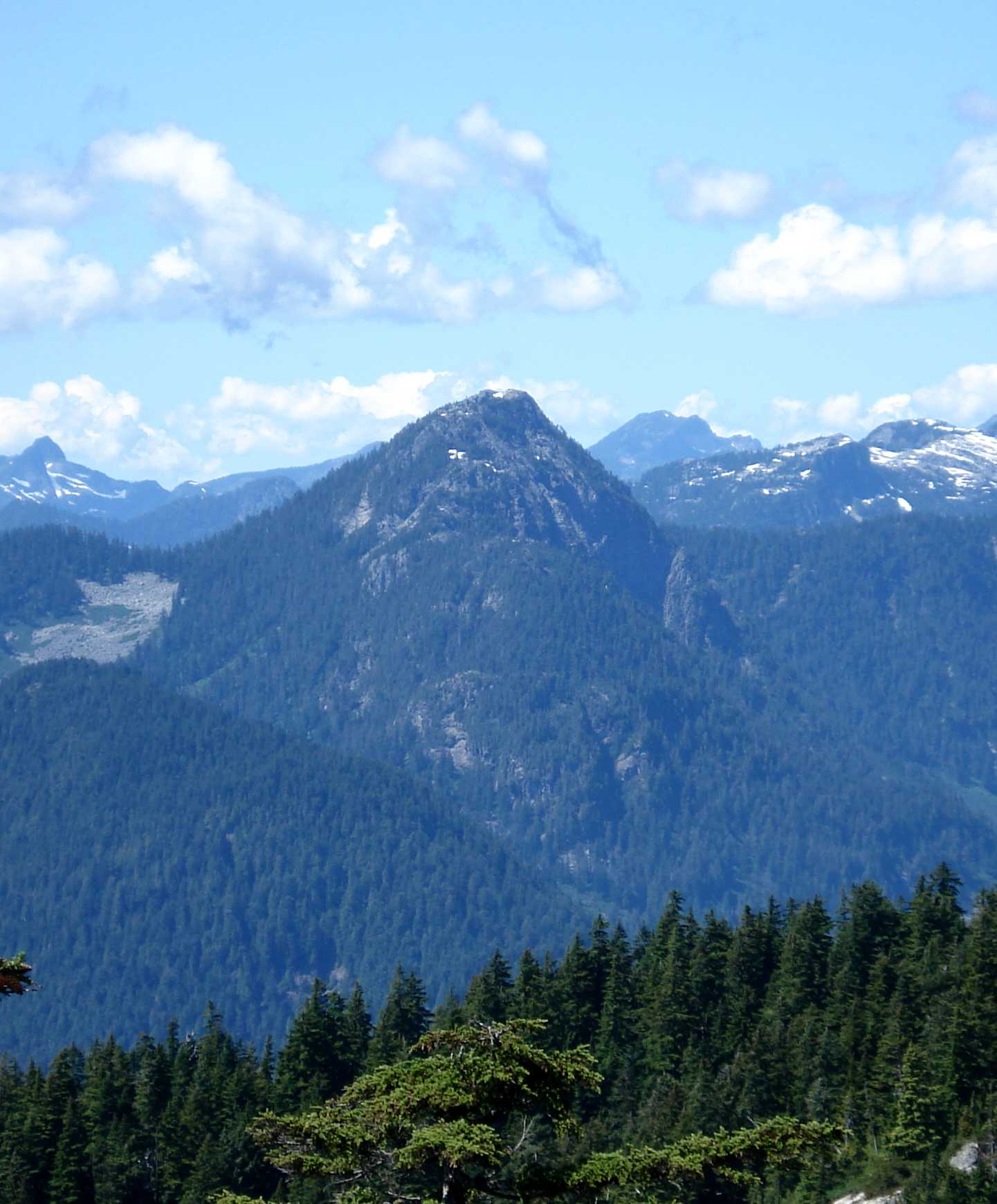
- Mount Elsay seen from Eagle Peak in the East

Highest point
- Elevation: 1,419 m (4,656 ft)
- Prominence: 254 m (833 ft)
- Coordinates: 49°24′24.8″N 122°56′13.9″W

Geography
- Location within Greater Vancouver Regional District Location within British Columbia
- Interactive map of Mount Elsay
- Location: British Columbia, Canada
- District: New Westminster Land District
- Parent range: Fannin Range, North Shore Mountains, Pacific Ranges
- Topo map: NTS 92G7 Port Coquitlam

Climbing
- First ascent: 1909 Unnamed BCMC party
- Easiest route: trail

Mount Elsay is a mountain in southwestern British Columbia, Canada, located near the middle of Mount Seymour Provincial Park in the District of North Vancouver. It is a part of the North Shore Mountains, rising from the shores of Indian Arm to a summit of 1,419 m (4,656 ft). It is named after nearby Elsay Lake and Creek. These names are thought to derive from a Scottish settler, probably after a place name in Scotland.

== History ==
A common misconception is that Elsay was originally named Mt. Jarrett in honour of George Jarrett, a South African who became the first secretary of the British Columbia Mountaineering Club (BCMC), in 1909. In fact, the name Jarrett was given to a nearby peak to the north which is sometimes called Deacon Peak.

The first recorded ascent of Elsay was on May 6, 1923, by a BCMC group of 29 hikers, led by the legendary BCMC director Tom Fyles (England, 1887-1979; Mount Fyles near Bella Coola is named in his honour), coming from Seymour and past Runner.

== Hiking routes ==
Unlike the nearby Mount Seymour, Elsay is not visited by hikers with much frequency. Two routes are most popular; the best hike is to go out by one and return by the other. The West Trail is reached by hiking toward Mount Seymour, then bearing left (west) in the saddle between Second and Third Peaks. A rough route poorly marked with tapes takes one around Mount Seymour's west flank, across the gully below Runner Peak, then trends upward to the ridge, then a rock face to the summit. Alternately, the Elsay Lake Trail takes one to the east of Mount Seymour, across several rockslides, then up a large talus slope (bear right to the low point of the ridge) to join the other trail on the south shoulder of the mountain. The route to Vicar Lakes, Mount Bishop and the Indian Arm Trail heads left shortly after the ridge starts to rise to Mount Elsay. The peak is flanked by Mount Bishop and Elsay Lake on the north, with Mount Seymour and Runner Peak to the south. This is rough backcountry and should be approached only with caution and experience.

== Crash site discovery ==
On 28 April 1947, a Lockheed 18 Lodestar Fin 53 CF-TDF, by Trans-Canada Air Lines (now Air Canada), disappeared in southwestern British Columbia with 15 people on board with no survivors. The crash site was discovered 47 years later, in September 1994, on Mount Elsay.
