= Seymour River (Shuswap Lake) =

Location
- Country: Canada
- Province: British Columbia
- Land District: Kamloops Division Yale

Physical characteristics
- Source: Monashee Mountains
- Mouth: Shuswap Lake
  - location: Seymour Arm
  - coordinates: 51°14′19″N 118°57′30″W
  - elevation: 324 m (1,063 ft)
- Basin size: 805 km^{2} (311 sq mi)

The Seymour River is a river in the North Shuswap of British Columbia, Canada. It starts from the Monashee Mountains north of Shuswap Lake, and flows towards south into the northern end of the Seymour Arm of the lake.

The river's main tributaries are Smoky House Creek and Ratchford Creek respectively. Just below the Ratchford Creek confluence, where the river rages through a narrow gorge, lies the Seymour River Falls, which is 40 feet (12 m) two-tiered waterfall. These falls can be accessed by two trails leading through the forest on both sides of the river.

The upper course of the river is protected by Upper Seymour River Provincial Park.

The river flows into the Seymour Arm of Shuswap Lake at the community of Seymour Arm ( 51°14'6.67"N, 118°57'34.16"W). The lower portion (approximately 18 km) of the river, below the falls, is important salmon spawning habitat, primarily for Sockeye but also Coho and Chinook. This river is referred to in the Water Survey of Canada's near-real-time hydrometric website as the Semour River Near Seymour Arm (station 08LE027).

== See also ==
- List of rivers of British Columbia
- List of tributaries of the Fraser River
- Seymour River (Burrard Inlet)
