= Seymour Arm =

Community in British Columbia, Canada

- Location of Seymour Arm in British Columbia
- Coordinates: 51°14′15″N 118°56′45″W
- Country: Canada
- Province: British Columbia
- Time zone: UTC−07:00 (PT)

Seymour Arm, known historically also as Ogdensville or Ogden City and Seymour, is an unincorporated area and former town located at the head of the inlet of the same name on Shuswap Lake in British Columbia, Canada. Located at the mouth of the Seymour River, adjacent to Silver Beach Provincial Park, and functioning as the disembarkation point for trails over passes across the Monashee Mountains connecting that river's valley to that of the Columbia River, and navigable by water from Savona at the farther end of Kamloops Lake,

== History ==
Seymour Arm became the location of a bustling boomtown serving travellers to the Big Bend Gold Rush on the Columbia which grew up around a Hudson's Bay Company post founded at the start of the rush in 1865. With a peak population of 5000, Seymour Arm had 13 stores, 11 shoemakers, 8 wash houses, 6 barber shops, 6 physicians, 6 saloons, 5 bakeries, 3 restaurants, 2 blacksmiths, 1 bath-house, 1 drug store, 1 stationery shop, a coffee and doughnut stand, and a livery stable. The town was destroyed by fire in the late 1860s but was revived again by English developers promoting the Seymour Arm Fruits Land Company, and a post office, school and hotel were established in 1910. The hotel closed in 1925 and by 1940 the town was largely abandoned, save for a few remaining settlers.

During and following the Vietnam and Korean Wars circa 1960-70, Seymour Arm drew significant numbers of "draft dodgers" from the United States, known to produce large clandestine outdoor Cannabis plantations in the area and with active smuggling routes to California. Cannabis cultivation continued into modern times with large indoor off-grid diesel-electric "grow-ops" culminating in a famous "bust" in 2004, the largest single Cannabis law enforcement action in Canadian history, involving hundreds of law enforcement officers.

Today the hotel, since reopened with a restaurant and pub, and one of the orchard-era mansions remain, and the locality is a farming and summer-recreational community.

== Climate ==
Seymour Arm has a humid continental climate (Dfb) with warm, sometimes hot summers coupled with cool nights, and cold, rainy winters, though mild by Canadian standards.

Climate data for Seymour Arm
Month	Jan	Feb	Mar	Apr	May	Jun	Jul	Aug	Sep	Oct	Nov	Dec	Year
Record high °C (°F)	12 (54)	10.5 (50.9)	15.6 (60.1)	32.8 (91.0)	36 (97)	35 (95)	38.9 (102.0)	36.7 (98.1)	31.1 (88.0)	23.5 (74.3)	12.5 (54.5)	8.5 (47.3)	38.9 (102.0)
Mean daily maximum °C (°F)	−2.5 (27.5)	1.1 (34.0)	7.1 (44.8)	14 (57)	19.3 (66.7)	23.1 (73.6)	25.7 (78.3)	25.3 (77.5)	19.4 (66.9)	11.3 (52.3)	2.7 (36.9)	−1.7 (28.9)	12.1 (53.8)
Mean daily minimum °C (°F)	−7.5 (18.5)	−5.4 (22.3)	−3 (27)	0.6 (33.1)	5.6 (42.1)	9.3 (48.7)	11.2 (52.2)	10.5 (50.9)	6.6 (43.9)	2.2 (36.0)	−2.1 (28.2)	−5.8 (21.6)	1.8 (35.2)
Record low °C (°F)	−32.5 (−26.5)	−29.5 (−21.1)	−25 (−13)	−10 (14)	−2.5 (27.5)	0.5 (32.9)	4.5 (40.1)	1 (34)	−4.5 (23.9)	−13 (9)	−33.5 (−28.3)	−34 (−29)	−34 (−29)
Average precipitation mm (inches)	91.5 (3.60)	80.6 (3.17)	58.7 (2.31)	57.4 (2.26)	75.6 (2.98)	85.5 (3.37)	78.8 (3.10)	76.3 (3.00)	66.1 (2.60)	75.9 (2.99)	114.7 (4.52)	117.7 (4.63)	978.9 (38.54)
Source: Environment Canada

== See also ==
- List of ghost towns in British Columbia
