= Mount Griffin Provincial Park =

Canadian provincial park

- IUCN category II (national park)
- Location within British Columbia
- Interactive map of Mount Griffin Provincial Park
- Location: British Columbia, Canada
- Nearest city: Revelstoke
- Coordinates: 50°55′25″N 118°34′30″W
- Area: 17.58 km^{2} (6.79 sq mi)
- Established: April 18, 2001
- Governing body: BC Parks

Mount Griffin Provincial Park is a provincial park in British Columbia, Canada, located southwest of Three Valley Gap (Eagle Pass).
