= Burges James Gadsden Provincial Park =

Provincial park in British Columbia, Canada

- IUCN category III (natural monument or feature)
- Location within British Columbia
- Interactive map of Burges James Gadsden Provincial Park
- Location: Columbia-Shuswap, British Columbia, Canada
- Coordinates: 51°24′39″N 117°03′19″W
- Area: 404 ha (1,000 acres)
- Established: June 24, 1965
- Governing body: BC Parks

Burges James Gadsden Provincial Park is a provincial park in British Columbia, Canada, south of the confluence of the Blaeberry and Columbia Rivers, northwest of Golden.
