= Yard Creek Provincial Park =

Provincial park in British Columbia, Canada

Yard Creek Park Campground
- Location within British Columbia
- Interactive map of Yard Creek Park Campground
- Location: British Columbia, Canada
- Nearest city: Sicamous
- Coordinates: 50°54′0″N 118°48′47″W
- Area: 1.75 km^{2} (0.68 sq mi)
- Governing body: CSRD parks/ Malakwa Community Association

Yard Creek Provincial Park is a provincial park located 15 kilometres east of Sicamous along the Trans-Canada Highway in British Columbia, Canada.

It also serves as a campground with 64 forested sites. Yard Creek campground was historically used as an internment camp for the Shuswap people.

== Conservation ==
The landscape surrounding Yard Creek Park is part of the Interior wetbelt characterized by cedar and hemlock forest and lush undergrowth. The park contains a variety of bird species including American dippers. These little birds dive into the icy waters of the creek and "fly" along under the water in search of water insects. They can be seen on the rocks along the creek.

== Recreation ==
The park contains 65 quiet shaded tent and RV camping sites, hiking trails, and a popular day-use area with a log picnic shelter.
