= Pukeashun Provincial Park =

Canadian provincial park

- IUCN category II (national park)
- Location within British Columbia
- Interactive map of Pukeashun Provincial Park
- Location: British Columbia, Canada
- Nearest city: Salmon Arm
- Coordinates: 51°11′40″N 119°15′36″W
- Area: 17.79 km^{2} (6.87 sq mi)
- Established: April 18, 2001
- Governing body: BC Parks

Pukeashun Provincial Park is a provincial park in British Columbia, Canada, located north of the community of Scotch Creek, near the city of Salmon Arm. The park is named for Pukeashun Mountain which is within its boundaries and a major local landmark. It protects part of the Adams Plateau, the southeastern portion of the Shuswap Highland.
