= Thomas McMicking =

- Born: April 16, 1829; Stamford Township, Welland County, Canada West
- Died: August 25, 1866 (aged 37) near New Westminster, British Columbia

Thomas McMicking IV (1829–1866) was the leader of the famed "Overlanders of '62" which traversed the continent in 1862 from Queenston, Canada West in search of gold in the Cariboo region of British Columbia. He was born on April 16, 1829, in Stamford Township, Welland County, Upper Canada (City of Niagara Falls) and died on August 25, 1866, when he drowned in the Fraser river near New Westminster, British Columbia. He died trying to save his son, Francis, who also drowned when both became stuck under a boom.

== Early life ==
McMicking was the eldest son of twelve children of William (Mar 6, 1805 - Aug 20, 1857) and Mary (née McClellan) McMicking (Aug 5, 1808 - Nov 13, 1873). He attended the local public school and Knox Presbyterian School in Toronto. He graduated from The University of Toronto and became a teacher in Stamford and Queenston. Later he became a businessman in the town of Queenston. He married Laura Chubbuck on July 23, 1857. They had three sons and two daughters. McMicking worked a while for his father-in-law, Job Chubbuck, who built the Chubbuck Block (later named the Fisher Block) in Queenston. He was an unsuccessful candidate as a Clear Grit in the Niagara election of 1861 losing out to Conservative John Simpson.

== Overlanders of 1862 ==
McMicking was the leader of the famed "Overlanders of '62" which traversed the continent in 1862 from Queenston, Canada West in search of gold in the Cariboo region of British Columbia. The party, including McMicking's 2nd youngest brother, Robert Burns McMicking (July 7, 1843 - Nov 27, 1915). left Queenston in April 1862. Having failed to discover any significant gold, McMicking travelled south and settled in New Westminster where he sent for his wife Laura and three small children (he later had two more children with Laura).

In 1864 he was appointed town clerk for New Westminster and in April 1866 deputy sheriff. He was active in the affairs of St Andrew's Presbyterian Church and was a member of the volunteer Hyack Fire Company. On June 26, 1866, he was secretary of a meeting called to organize a local home guard, when news arrived from Canada of the Fenian raids. The corps subsequently elected him 1st lieutenant.
