= White Lake Provincial Park =

Provincial park in British Columbia, Canada

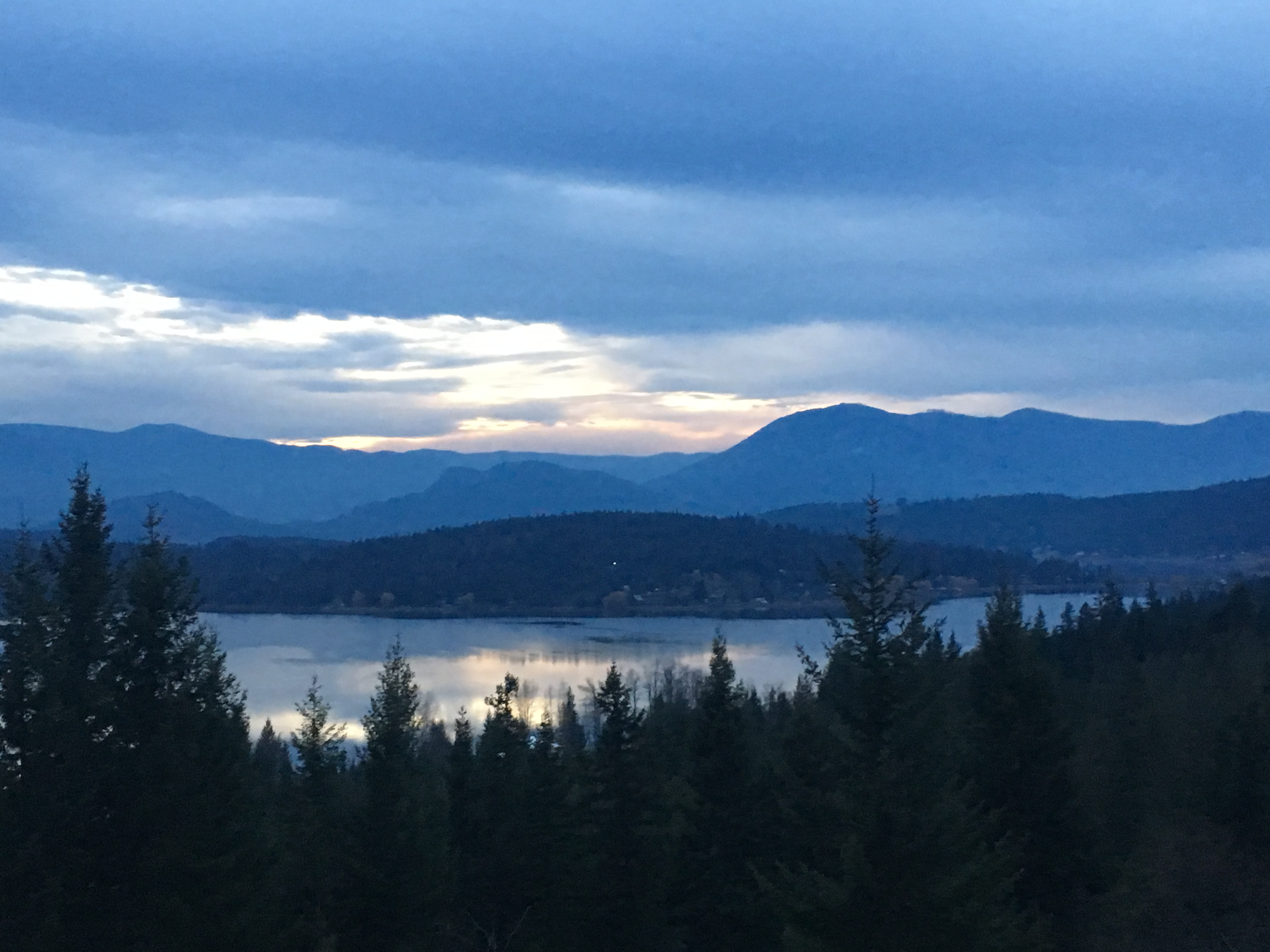

- Location within British Columbia
- Interactive map of White Lake Provincial Park
- Location: British Columbia, Canada
- Nearest city: Salmon Arm
- Coordinates: 50°53′20″N 119°15′51″W
- Area: 266 ha (660 acres)
- Established: 1965
- Governing body: BC Parks

White Lake Provincial Park is a provincial park in British Columbia, Canada and is located 10 kilometres northeast of Balmoral, British Columbia. Established in 1965, the park is just west of Cedar Creek Camp, a park owned by the not-for-profit organisation of People In Motion. The lake is popular with anglers fishing for rainbow trout; in terms of angler days, it is one of the top three fishing lakes in the province.

== Recreation ==
The following recreational activities are available: camping, swimming, canoeing, kayaking, boating, rainbow trout fishing and ice fishing.
