= English Lake Provincial Park =

Canadian public reserve in British Columbia

- IUCN category II (national park)
- Location within British Columbia
- Interactive map of English Lake Provincial Park
- Location: Kamloops Division Yale Land District, British Columbia, Canada
- Nearest city: Revelstoke, BC
- Coordinates: 50°54′54″N 118°19′54″W
- Area: 337 ha (830 acres)
- Established: May 17, 2004
- Governing body: BC Parks

English Lake Provincial Park is a provincial park in British Columbia, Canada. Located near Revelstoke, British Columbia, English Lake Provincial Park has an area of 337 hectares.
