= Silver Beach Provincial Park =

Provincial park in British Columbia, Canada

- IUCN category II (national park)
- Location within British Columbia
- Interactive map of Silver Beach Provincial Park
- Location: British Columbia, Canada
- Nearest city: Seymour Arm
- Coordinates: 51°14′27″N 118°57′33″W
- Area: 1.29 km^{2} (0.50 sq mi)
- Established: September 18, 1969
- Governing body: BC Parks

Silver Beach Provincial Park is a provincial park in British Columbia, Canada, located at the head of the Seymour Arm of Shuswap Lake in that province's Shuswap Country, adjacent to the settlement of Seymour Arm.
