= Shuswap Lake Provincial Park =

Provincial park in British Columbia, Canada

Shuswap Provincial Park
- IUCN category II (national park)
- Panoramic view

- Location within British Columbia
- Interactive map of Shuswap Provincial Park
- Location: British Columbia, Canada
- Nearest city: Chase
- Coordinates: 50°54′30″N 119°26′22″W
- Area: 1.49 km^{2} (0.58 sq mi)
- Established: November 14, 1956
- Governing body: BC Parks

Shuswap Lake Provincial Park is a provincial park in British Columbia, Canada. It is located in the community of Scotch Creek, on the north shore of the main arm of Shuswap Lake in the Southern Interior of BC. The park is about 45 minutes north (by road) of Salmon Arm, and about 1 hour east of Kamloops. The park contains a large campground with approximately 275 camping sites, as well as a large sand and gravel beach and day use/picnic area. There are also two playgrounds and a small bike park located within the provincial park. It is a very popular park, with many thousands of people, primarily from BC and Alberta, camping there every year.

The Park is located on an old delta of Scotch Creek, and was the location of First Nations settlements. Some evidence of Kekuli (semi-subterranean pit houses used by Shuswap First Nations peoples) exist within the park boundaries, and a model of this type of structure has been constructed near the park's Nature House.
