= Blanket Creek Provincial Park =

Provincial park in British Columbia, Canada

- IUCN category II (national park)
- Location within British Columbia
- Interactive map of Blanket Creek Provincial Park
- Location: Kootenay Land District, British Columbia, Canada
- Nearest city: Revelstoke, BC
- Coordinates: 50°49′59″N 118°04′59″W
- Area: 318 ha (790 acres)
- Established: February 18, 1982
- Governing body: BC Parks

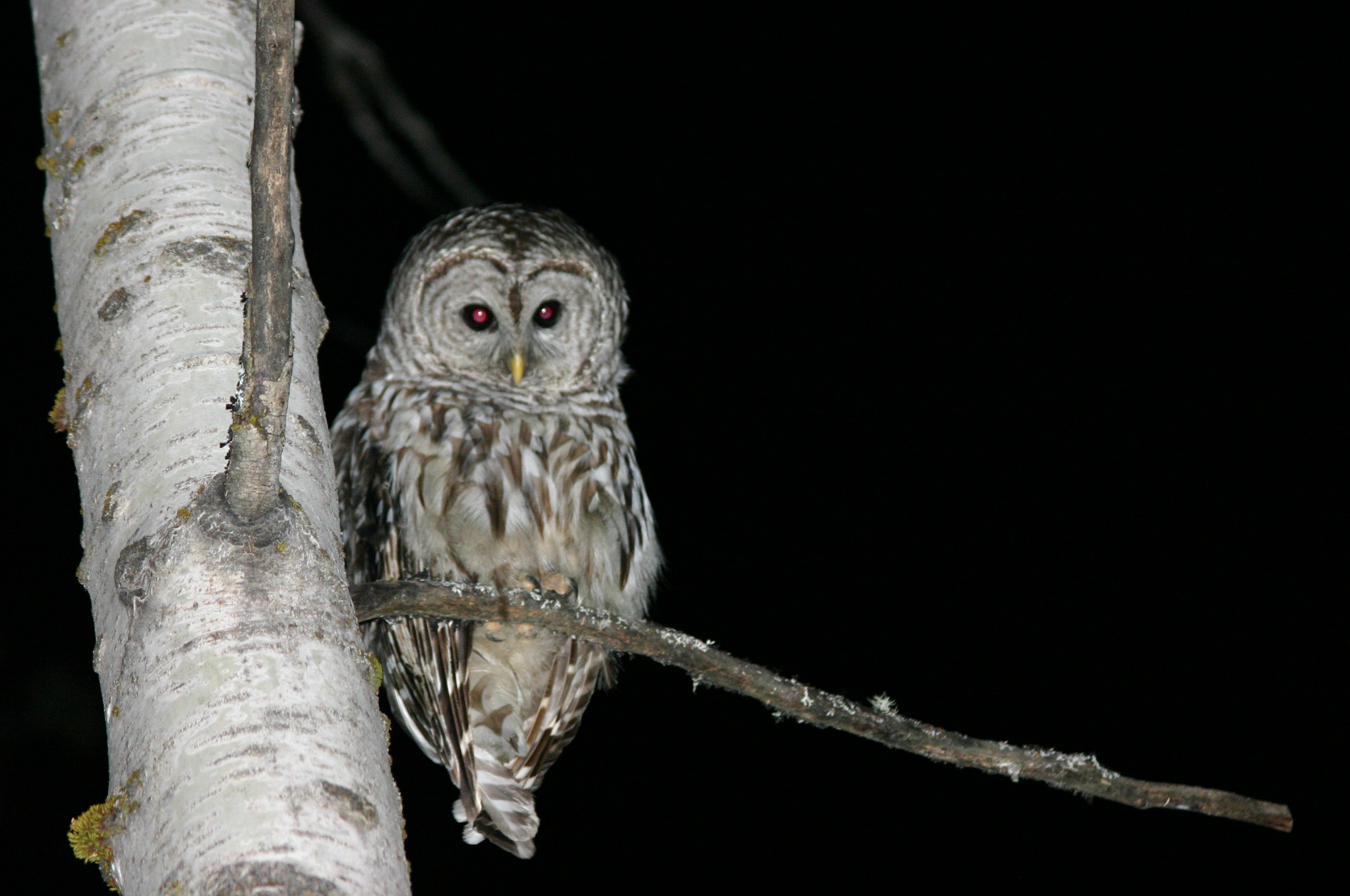
Barred owl (Strix varia) perched on a birch tree at Blanket Creek Provincial Park

Blanket Creek Provincial Park is a provincial park in British Columbia, Canada. The park is 318 hectares (790 acres) in size. It hosts one of the nearest campgrounds for visitors going to the Mount Revelstoke National Park.
