= Kingfisher Creek Provincial Park =

Provincial park in British Columbia, Canada

Kingfisher Provincial Park
- IUCN category II (national park)
- Location within British Columbia
- Interactive map of Kingfisher Provincial Park
- Location: British Columbia, Canada
- Nearest city: Vernon
- Coordinates: 50°47′59″N 118°47′00″W
- Area: 4.4 km^{2} (1.7 sq mi)
- Governing body: BC Parks

Kingfisher Creek Provincial Park is a provincial park in British Columbia, Canada located 15 km southeast of Sicamous and west of Mabel Lake in the Monashee Mountains. The park is 440 hectares and was created to enhance the viability of the Kingfisher Creek Ecological Preserve.
