= Martha Creek Provincial Park =

Provincial park of British Columbia

- Location within British Columbia
- Interactive map of Martha Creek Provincial Park
- Location: British Columbia, Canada
- Nearest city: Revelstoke, BC
- Coordinates: 51°08′49″N 118°12′04″W
- Area: 71 hectares (180 acres)
- Governing body: BC Parks
- Website: Official website

Martha Creek Provincial Park is a provincial park in British Columbia, Canada, located on the Lake Revelstoke Reservoir north of the city of Revelstoke.
