= Elsay Lake =

Lake in British Columbia, Canada

- seen from Mount Bishop Looking South

- Location within Greater Vancouver Regional District
- Location: North Vancouver, British Columbia
- Coordinates: 49.417°N 122.939°W
- Primary inflows: runoff from Mount Elsay
- Primary outflows: Elsay Creek
- Basin countries: Canada

Elsay Lake is a lake 15 kilometres (9.3 mi) North East of the City of North Vancouver, located near the Centre of Mount Seymour Provincial Park in the District of North Vancouver, British Columbia. Originally named Mystery Lake and still known to some as such. It has subsequently been renamed Lake Elsay, after nearby Elsay Creek. This name is thought to derive from a Scottish settler, probably after a place name in Scotland.

== Hiking routes ==
It is most easily accessed via the Elsay Lake Trail which takes one to the East of Mount Seymour and Mount Elsay. Although a rugged trail, it is fairly well marked, and can be accomplished by most reasonably fit and experienced people in 4–6 hours one way. Such is not the case for the two other, unofficial trails, one to the west of Mt Seymour and Mt Elsay, which continues on as the Indian Arm Trail after the point where one can head down to Elsay Lake, the other midway up the slopes above Indian Arm from the Mt Seymour access road to Elsay Creek, thence following the creek up to a junction with the official trail. Many inadvertent overnight stays and/or rescues have occurred here due to hikers underestimating the difficulty and time required for even the official trail. There is a small emergency shelter at the lake. Do not attempt without full knowledge of the terrain and routes.

== See also ==
- List of lakes of British Columbia
