= Upper Seymour River Provincial Park =

Provincial park in British Columbia, Canada

- IUCN category II (national park)
- Location within British Columbia
- Interactive map of Upper Seymour River Provincial Park
- Location: British Columbia, Canada
- Nearest city: Salmon Arm
- Coordinates: 51°37′39″N 118°55′59″W
- Area: 106.72 km^{2} (41.20 sq mi)
- Established: April 18, 2001
- Governing body: BC Parks

Upper Seymour River Provincial Park is a provincial park in British Columbia, Canada. Located in an isolated area in the interior of the province, 40 kilometres north of the community of Seymour Arm. It protects at the headwaters of the Seymour River, which is the major drainage system into the Seymour Arm of Shuswap Lake.

== History ==
The 10,672 hectare park was proposed via the Okanagan-Shuswap Land and Resource Management Plan (LRMP) process and was later established as a Class A Park on April 18, 2001.

== Geography ==
A large mountain valley that extends from a low river floodplain at an elevation of 600 metres to steep and narrow headwaters that culminate at Seymour Pass with an elevation of 1200 metres. The valley sides are steep with slide paths and streams leading from ridges and basins. The southern section of the park is the main entrance into the park via forest service road from Seymour Arm, this section has a floodplain ecosystem with the meandering Seymour river forming extensive wetlands of shallow ponds, marshes, wet meadows, fens and shrub carr habitats. While the northern section is vast pristine wilderness, with no apparent sign of human use.

== Nature ==
A very wet climate in the upper Seymour valley creates optimal growing conditions for interior cedar and hemlock forests with some of the oldest and largest old growth cedars (600 to 1,000 years old) in the southern Interior. is home to mule deer and moose while is seasonal habitat for mountain caribou and grizzlies. The river has native stocks of rainbow trout, and a small number of swans can be seen during the summer.

== Recreation ==
Steep slopes and thick forest understory pose difficult and challenging terrain conditions for hiking although the high glaciers and alpine tundra of the northern Columbia Mountains are used for heli based tourism activities: skiing, touring, mountaineering, fishing and hiking.
