= Mount Seymour Provincial Park =

Canadian provincial park

- IUCN category II (national park)
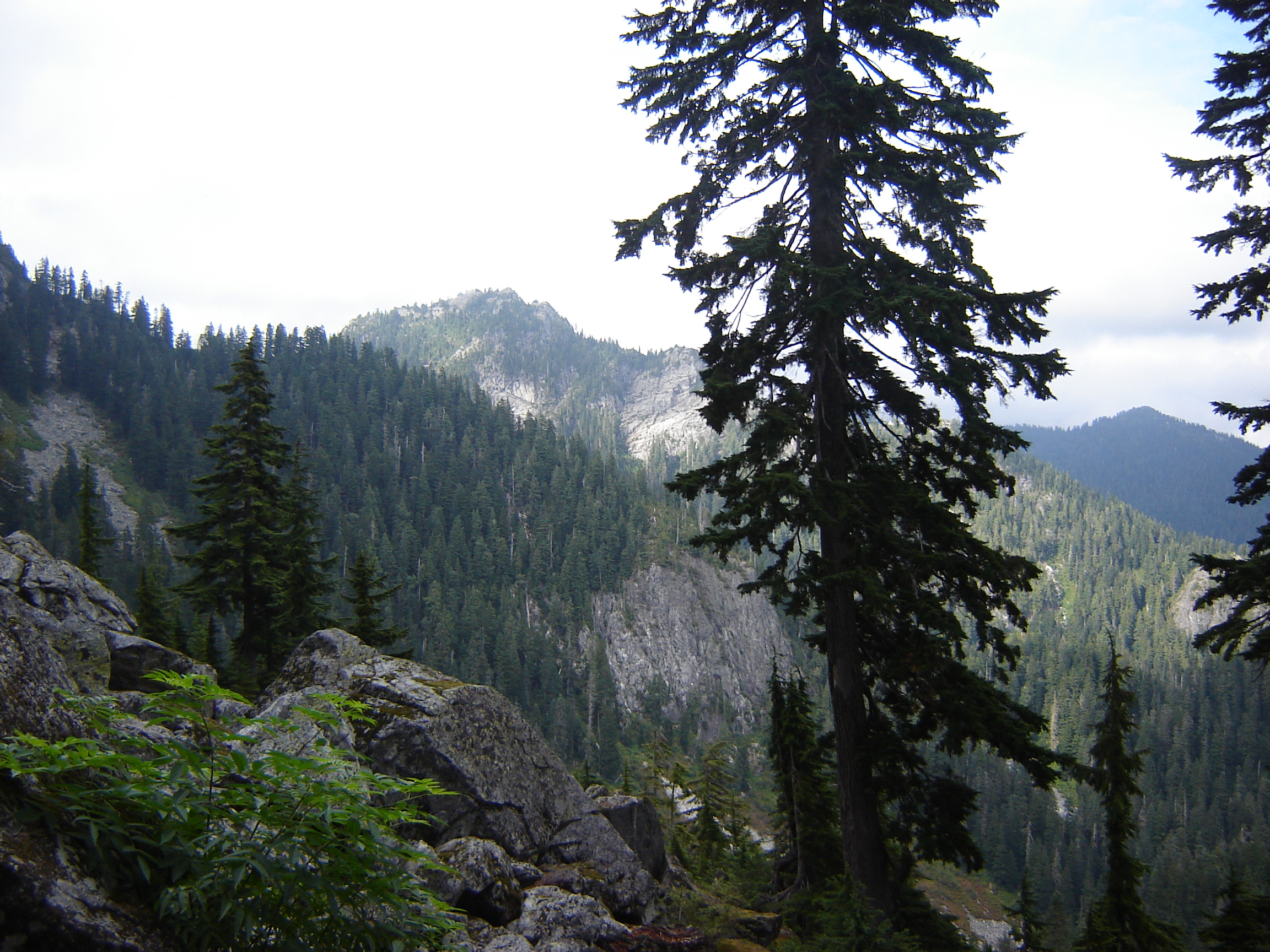
- Mount Seymour Provincial Park. September, 2005; East slopes, looking north toward Mt. Elsay

- Location within British Columbia Location within Greater Vancouver Regional District
- Interactive map of Mount Seymour Provincial Park
- Location: Metro Vancouver, British Columbia, Canada
- Nearest city: North Vancouver
- Coordinates: 49°23′6″N 122°56′7″W
- Area: 35 km^{2} (14 sq mi)
- Established: 1936
- Visitors: 949,171 (in 2017-18)
- Governing body: BC Parks
- Website: bcparks.ca/mount-seymour-park/

Mount Seymour Provincial Park is a park in Vancouver, British Columbia's North Shore Mountains. With an area of 35 square kilometres, it is located approximately 15 kilometres north of Downtown Vancouver. The park, named after Frederick Seymour, was established in 1936. Mount Seymour Provincial Park provides visitors with a variety of recreational activities and animals with natural habitat.

== Geography ==
Mount Seymour Provincial Park is in a mountain wilderness setting and several mountain peaks lie within its boundaries, including Mount Bishop, Mount Elsay, Runner Peak, and Mount Seymour. This park and its several mountain peaks are provincially run and operated. The highest elevation in the park is the summit of Mount Bishop at 1509 metres followed by Mount Seymour, for which the park is named, at 1449 metres. The park contains several lakes, including Elsay Lake (the largest), Pencier Lake, Gopher Lake, Mystery Lake, and Goldie Lake. Many lakes within the park drain into the Seymour River, which is west of the park.

=== Climate ===
Mount Seymour Provincial Park features an oceanic climate (Köppen climate type Cfb). As the park covers a wide area, precipitation type is highly dependent on elevation; higher elevations receive upwards of 1,000 centimetres (390 in) of snow per year. Conversely, lower elevations receive around 100 centimetres (39 in) of snow per year.

== Animals and wildlife ==
Mount Seymour Provincial Park is a habitat for a variety of wildlife animal and plant species. Among the bigger animals, deer and coyotes are most frequently observed near the access road, while in the backcountry, black bears, bobcats or cougars can be seen. To preserve the wildlife and to prevent attacks, the park has laws against hikers and tourists from feeding or tormenting wildlife animals. Groups like the Society For The Prevention Of Cruelty To Animals (BC SPCA) and the Animal Advocates Society look to preserve and protect animals.

The park is home to much smaller animals and creatures as well. Species of birds such as the chickadee, sapsucker, grouse and siskin are commonly seen. Mount Seymour park provides an opportunity to see other birds like the Canada jay, raven, and the Steller's jay, which happens to be the official bird of British Columbia. This bird was chosen as British Columbia's Ministry of Environment and Parks launched a three-month campaign to select a provincial bird in 1987. The campaign was tied in with the province’s celebration of Wildlife ‘87, the centennial of wildlife conservation in Canada.

These wild animals are found in Mount Seymour Provincial Park.

Big animals	Small animals
Coyote	Kinglet
Black bears	Grouse
Cougar	Douglas squirrel
Pine marten	Chickadee
Deer	Sapsucker
Bobcat	Siskin

== Vegetation ==
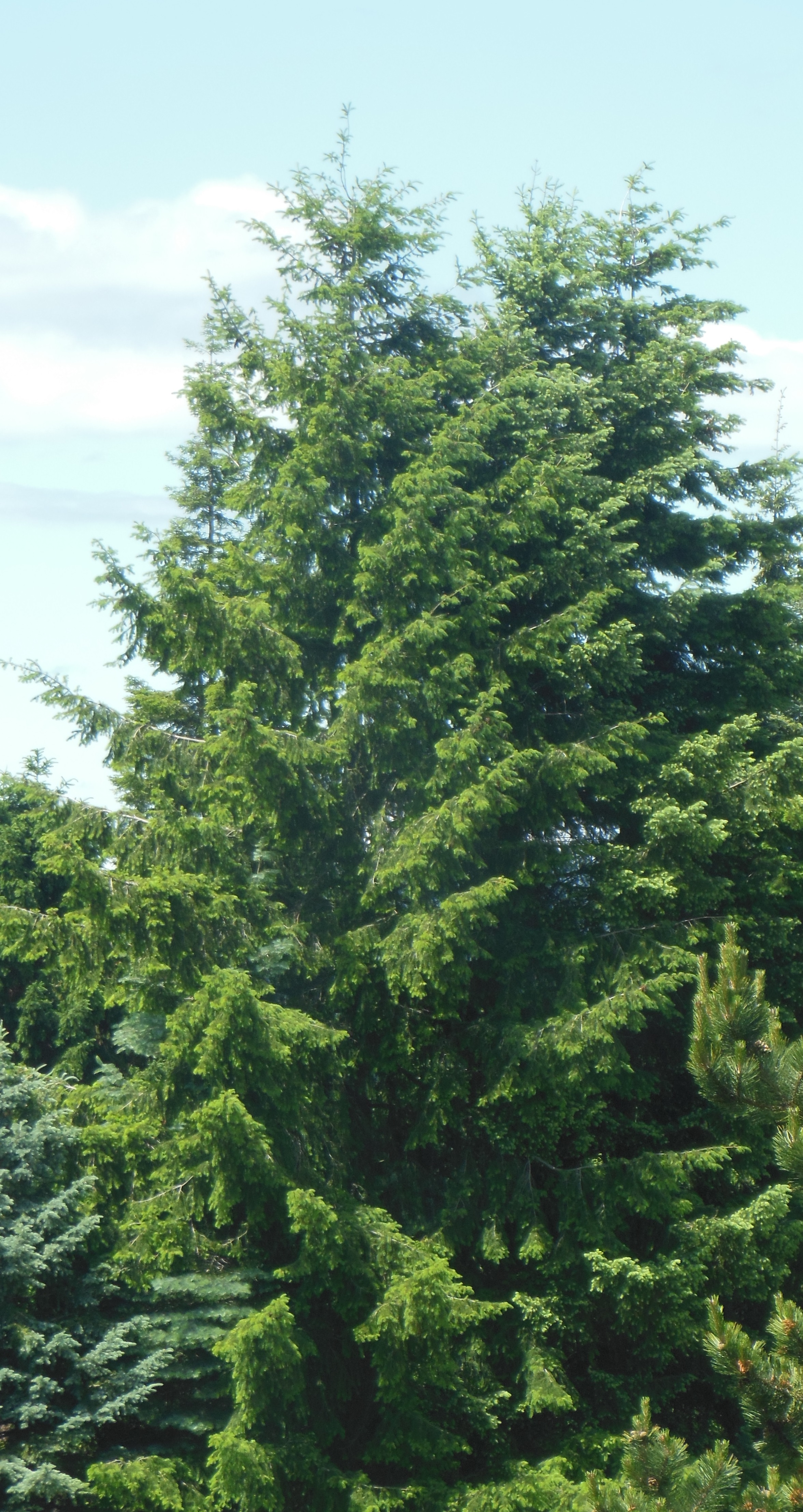
A Douglas fir tree is commonly seen throughout the Mount Seymour Provincial Park.

The Mount Seymour Provincial Park is 3,508 hectares with a variety of natural foliage and forest. The park contains old-growth Douglas fir trees and western red cedar that cover the landscape. As well, second-growth coniferous and deciduous trees populate the park. At higher elevations of the park, we see a transition from forest to open meadows. In certain areas, it is common to see sub-alpine flowers like the Clematis occidentalis, ballhead waterleaf and the Cusick's speedwell flower.

The Provincial Park on Mount Seymour has a history of infestations of various invasive plants. Invasive plants (also called "non-indigenous" or "non-native") outcompete native species for basic necessities, such as nutrients and space, affecting many habitats and bioregions. Mount Seymour Provincial Park is no stranger to its own share of invasive plants. There are often clumps of Japanese knotweed seen around the park. It is common to see bull thistles growing on a mound of old road and clay pushed up around a pullout. St John’s wort, Lamium and Himalayan blackberry grow among the thicket of native flora that provide a view for occasional mountain bikers that pass by. Some of the other invasive plants inventoried by the park include:

- Lamium (yellow archangel)
- Periwinkle
- Yellow hawkweed
- Sow thistle
- Oxeye daisy

Japanese knotweed is an invasive species in the area. Knotweed roots are known to break off and float downstream, forming new infestations and threatening the stream banks. Yellow hawkweed tends to invade open and undisturbed natural areas. It establishes and spreads along roads or areas that are yet to reforest, affecting the forest industry.

Invasive plants are often handled and dealt with by the Invasive Species Council of Metro Vancouver (ISCMV). The ISCMV conduct inventory and both mechanical and chemical invasive species control work. Their projects and work extend across the Metro Vancouver Area. They deal with invasive species like knotweed, giant hogweed and selective herbicide control methods. Invasive Species Council (ISC) of British Columbia deals with the invasive plants as well. It has Invasive Plant Training Program that teaches invasive plant identification, monitoring techniques and tools of integrated pest management to the participants. Also, ISC organizes Community Weed Pulls to gather volunteer groups to get rid of the invasive plants.

== Recreational activities ==
There is an extensive network of mountain biking, hiking, and equestrian trails on the lower mountain, while the upper mountain offers picknicking, skiing, snowboarding, snowshoeing, snowtubing, tobogganing, and backcountry camping. Different parts of mountain trails have different uses throughout the year. While both mountain bikers and hikers can use lower mountain trails, upper mountain trails are restricted to hikers.

=== Summer season ===
Mount Seymour Provincial Park provides 14 different hiking trails varying with elevation levels and difficulties.

Trail Name	Difficulty	Length/ elevation	Suggested hiking time	Starting point / end point
Old Cabin	easy	430 metres/ 25 metres	20 minutes	Parking Lot 1/ Perimeter Trail Junction
Dinky Peak	easy	750 metres/25 metres	15 minutes	Mount Seymour Trail/ Dinky Bluff
Mushroom Parking Lot	easy	750 metres/ minimal	30 minutes	Vancouver Picnic Area Parking lot/-
Old Buck Access	easy	1 kilometre/ minimal	45 minutes	Vancouver Picnic Area Parking lot/ junction with the Old Buck Trail
Mystery Lake	moderate	1.5 kilometre/180 metres	45 minutes	North end of Parking lot 4/ chairlift right-of-way to the lake
Perimeter	moderate	1.5 kilometre/ 150 metres	45 minutes	Deep Cove lookout/ Goldie Lake access trail junction
Flower Lake Loop	easy	1.5 kilometre/ 150 metres	-	Goldie lake Trail/ sub-alpine bog and pond community
First Lake Loop and Dog mountain	moderate	2 kilometres/ -	-	First lake/ Dog Mountain
Goldie Lake Loop	easy	2 kilometres/ minimal	1 hour	First Aid building/ Goldie Lake
Old Buck Trail	moderate	2.3 kilometres,5.5 kilometres/ -, -	45 minutes, 2 hours	-
Horse Trail	moderate	2.5 kilometres/ -	-	-
Baden-Powell	difficult	42 kilometres total/ -	-	Goldie lake Trail/ Deep Cove/ Horseshoe Bay
Mount Seymour	difficult	4 kilometres/ 450 metres	2.5 hours	First lake/ North end of the top parking lot/ Pump Peaks
Elsay Lake	difficult	7 kilometres/ 500 metres	9 – 10 hours	First Aid building/ -/back country shelter

*Unclear information is marked with -

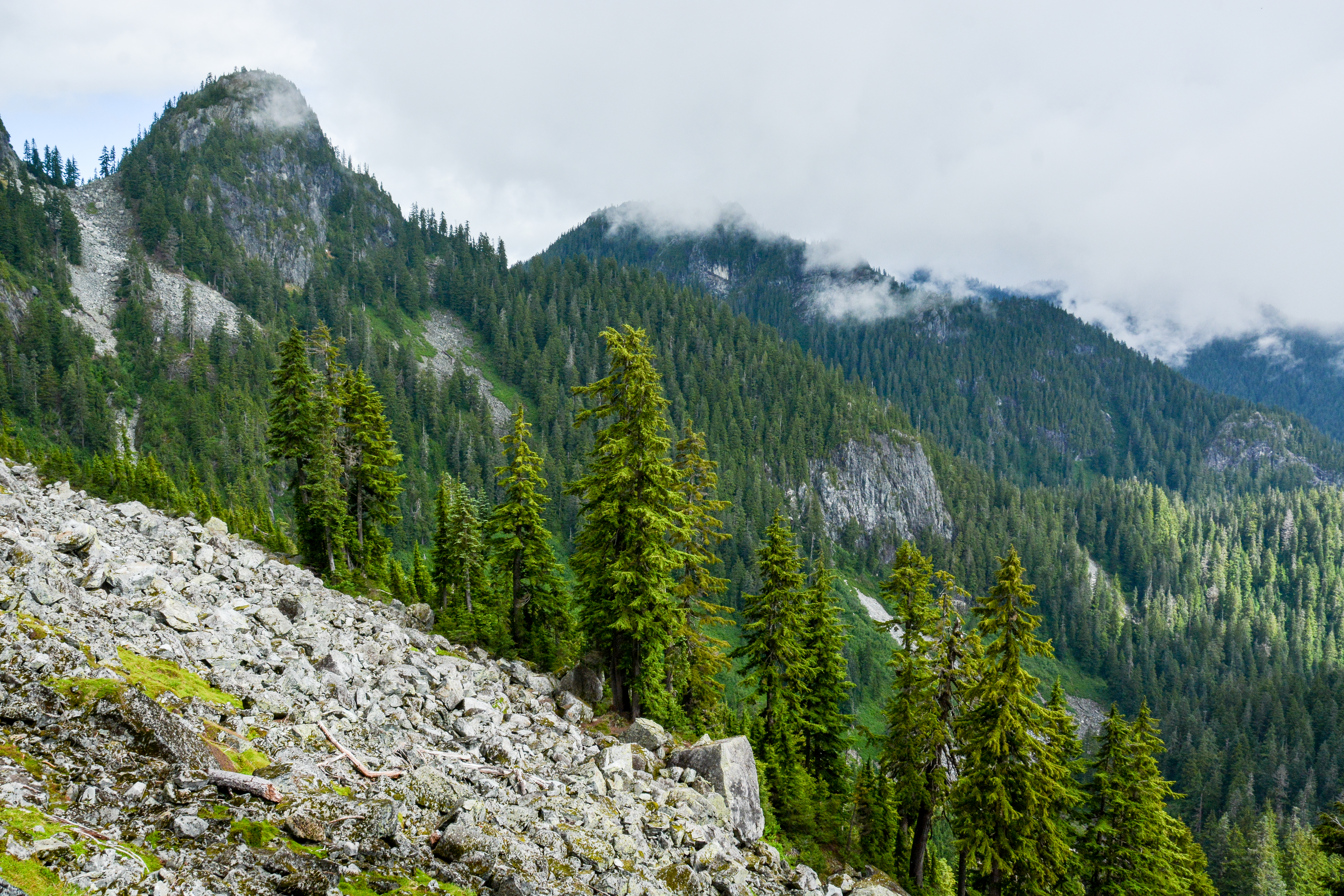
Runner Peak and Mount Elsay from the Elsay Lake Trail

Mountain biking is permitted only on designated trails within the park boundary. The mountain bike restricted trails include Upper Old Buck Access Trail, Mount Seymour Main Trail, Perimeter Trail, Goldie Lake Trail, Flower Lake Trail, Mystery Lake Trail, Old Cabin Trail and Dinky Peak Trail.

Old Buck Trail is the only trail throughout the park that allows horseback riding.

There are several lakes in Mount Seymour Provincial Park such as Goldie Lake, Flower Lake, and Mystery Lake. There is no regulation for swimming but there are no lifeguards at duty.

With a valid fishing licence, visitors of the park can fish in the Elsay Lake; it can be accessed only through Elsay Lake trail.

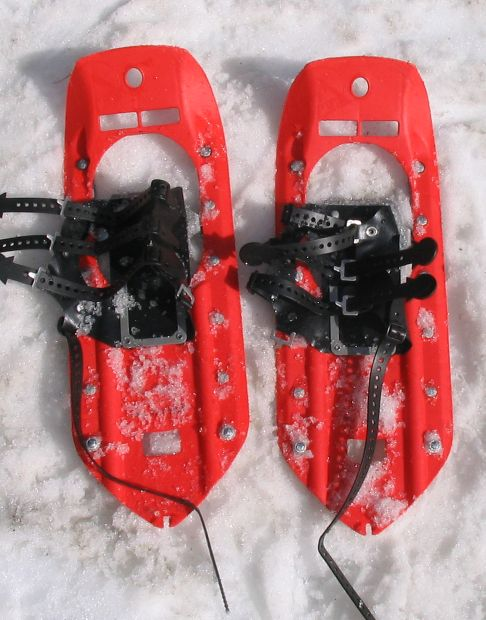
Snowshoeing is a common pastime during the winter within the Mount Seymour Provincial Park

=== Winter season ===
The provincial park provides winter trails for activities like snowshoeing and backcountry skiing. These trails are open from mid-December to March 31 each year. Snowshoers, backcountry skiers, snowboarders and hikers are also allowed use of these the backcountry trails. Passes or permits are not required to use the BC Parks Backcountry.

Trail Name	Difficulty	Length	Suggested hiking time	Starting point	View
Mount Seymour Backcountry Access trail	moderate - difficult	7 km	3hrs on skis/ 4 hrs on snowshoes	Parking Lot 4	views between the 1st and 2nd pump
First Lake trail	easy	4 km	1.5 hrs on skis/2 hrs on snowshoes	Parking Lot 4	

== Mount Seymour Ski Resort ==
Mount Seymour Ski Area
- Interactive map of Mount Seymour Ski Area
- Location: British Columbia, Canada
- Nearest city: North Vancouver, 15 km (9 mi)
- Coordinates: 49°23′46″N 122°56′40″W
- Vertical: 330 m (1,083 ft)
- Top elevation: 1,265 m (4,150 ft)
- Base elevation: 935 m (3,068 ft)
- Skiable area: 200 acres
- Trails: 41 total 17% beginner 63% intermediate 20% expert
- Longest run: 1.6 km (1 mi)
- Lift system: 5 total 2 high speed detachable quad 1 double chairlifts 2 magic carpets
- Snowfall: 1,200 cm (472 in)
- Website: Mt. Seymour

Mount Seymour is one mountain located within the Mount Seymour Provincial Park. Originally, Mount Seymour was operated by the provincial government and was deemed a "recreation area" by the provincial government, which is defined as land set aside for public recreational use. In 1984, the government gave control of Mount Seymour to the commercial entity and private operator, Mount Seymour Resorts Ltd. Through this transfer of ownership, the mountain changed from being a recreational area, to requiring a "park use permit". With a park use permit, this allows Mount Seymour Resorts to provide commercial recreation services within its "Controlled Recreation Area".

The ski area of Mount Seymour Resorts has 5 ski lifts:

- Mystery Peak Express quad chairlift,
- Lodge coveryor belt loaded quad chairlift,
- Brockton double chairlift,
- Goldie magic carpet
- Bear's Den magic carpet

The company offers activities such as skiing, snowshoeing, and snowboarding. There are 41 marked skiing and snowboarding trails excluding glades like Unicorn Glades or Pete's Glades. There are also 11 snowshoe trails, with the most difficult trail, Cougar's Pass, directly connecting to Perimeter Trail, a BC Park Trail. The privately owned area has 330 m (1,083 ft) of vertical as well as 19 trails open for night skiing. Six terrain parks, Seymour Park, The Pit Terrain Park, Young Gun Terrain Park, Northlands Park, Dark Park, and Mushroom Park, belonging to Mount Seymour.

Mount Seymour Resorts offers snow tubing and tobogganing, by offering the Enquist Tube Park. The Tube Park offers four tubing lanes with a vertical drop of 100 meters and eight toboggan lanes.

== Accidents and rescues ==
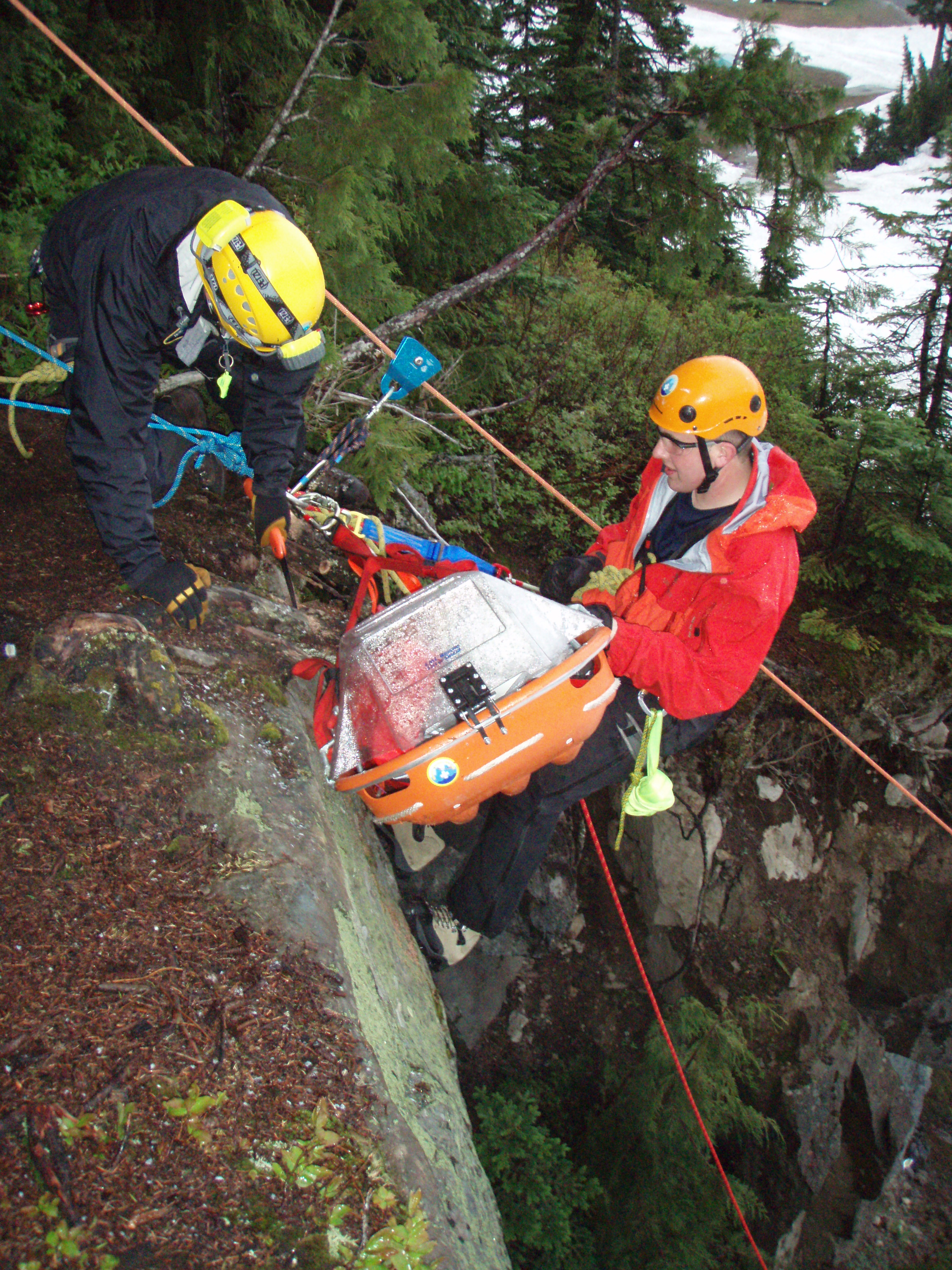
North Shore Rescue members perform a rescue training exercise on a vertical cliff.

Due to its proximity to a large metropolitan area, Mount Seymour Provincial Park attracts larger numbers of visitors and recreational users than many other rugged, mountainous areas. This in part, has led to hundreds of lost, stranded, and injured hikers, as well as many skiers and snowshoers that have required rescue, and even suffered death. Visitors should be aware there are incidents such as in July 2010, a longboarder was killed from an accident outside Mount Seymour Provincial Park.

The North Shore Rescue is a mountain search and rescue team. The team consists of approximately 40 volunteers skilled in search and rescue operations in mountain, canyon and urban settings. They are often called when an individual is trapped or in danger in the park.

== Broadcasting and media ==
Mount Seymour is home to many Vancouver-area broadcasters. They have their transmitters set up on the slopes of Mount Seymour, allowing it to face over the entire Greater Vancouver area. Some broadcasters include FM radio station, CKKS-FM-2 107.5 (Kiss) and CJAX-FM 96.9 (Jack FM). As well, many TV stations such as CBUT-DT (CBC): UHF 43 (digital) and CHAN-DT (Global): UHF 22 (digital) have their transmitters located on the mountain.

== See also ==
- List of ski areas and resorts in Canada
- Grouse Mountain
- Cypress Mountain
- Mount Seymour
- Whistler, British Columbia
