= Arrow Lakes Provincial Park =

Provincial park of British Columbia

- IUCN category II (national park)
- Location within British Columbia
- Interactive map of Arrow Lakes Provincial Park
- Location: Kootenay Land District, British Columbia, Canada
- Nearest city: Revelstoke, BC
- Coordinates: 49°51′59″N 118°04′05″W
- Area: 93 ha (230 acres)
- Established: May 8, 1981
- Governing body: BC Parks

Arrow Lakes Provincial Park is a provincial park in British Columbia, Canada.

== Park ==
The park was established May 8, 1981. The primary role of the park is to maintain a tourism travel route and local opportunities for outdoor recreation. Located 150 kilometres (93 mi) south of Revelstoke, British Columbia, it is 93 hectares (230 acres) in size.

=== Lakes ===
The Columbia River widens to form Upper Arrow Lake and Lower Arrow Lake between the Selkirk Mountains to the east and the Monashee Mountains to the west.
