= Seymour River (Burrard Inlet) =

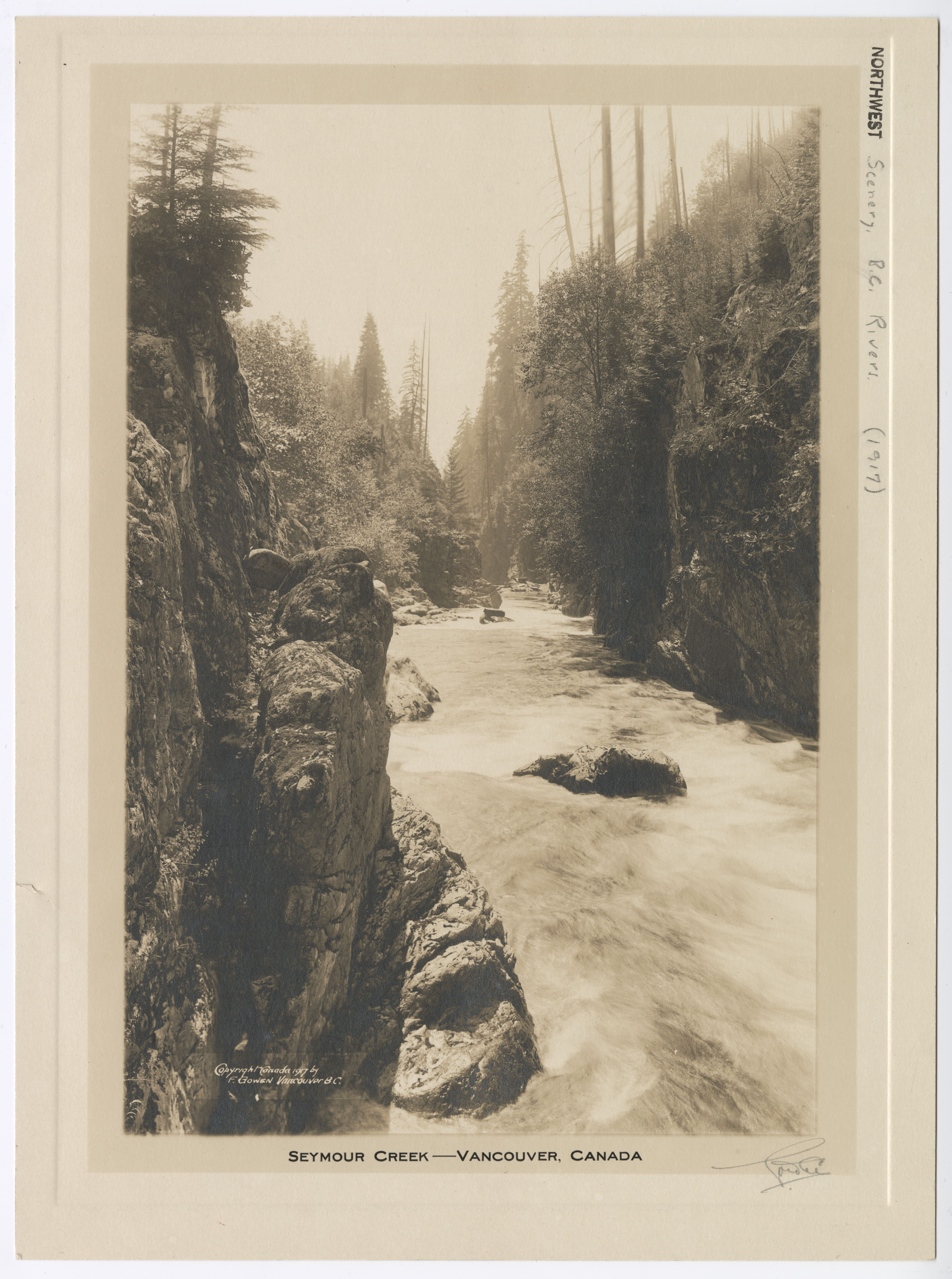
- Seymour River in 1917

Location
- Country: Canada
- Province: British Columbia
- District: New Westminster Land District

Physical characteristics
- Source: Loch Lomond (BC)
  - location: Pacific Ranges
  - coordinates: 49°35′19″N 123°02′16″W
  - elevation: 1,046 m (3,432 ft)
- Mouth: Vancouver Harbour
  - location: Burrard Inlet
  - coordinates: 49°17′50″N 123°1′20″W
  - elevation: 0 m (0 ft)

The Seymour River is a river in North Vancouver, British Columbia which is notable for being several degrees warmer than other streams and lakes in the area. This is due to it being fed from a large reservoir backed up behind a dam from which a constant flow of water is released. The upper portion of the river and the reservoir are part of the Seymour watershed, controlled by Metro Vancouver.

The Seymour River has been the main water supply for North Vancouver since 1907. The first intake was built in 1907 and the first Seymour Dam was constructed in 1927. The present day Seymour Falls Dam was constructed 1961. Up to 40,000 fed coho fry are released above the dam each year by the Seymour Salmonid Society.

The hydrometric data for this river is presented by the Water Survey of Canada.

== Seymour River Suspension Bridge ==
As of December 20, 2018, the new Seymour River Suspension Bridge was opened and once again, the hiking and mountain biking trails on the east and west sides of the river are connected. This includes trails such as the Fisherman's Trail and the hiking route connecting multiple trails known as Two Canyon Loop.

== See also ==
- List of rivers of British Columbia
- Seymour River (Shuswap Lake)
