= Capilano =

Capilano may refer to a number of things mostly associated with Capilano in British Columbia, Canada, or, alternately, the one in Edmonton in neighbouring Alberta:

Landmarks

- Capilano Lake (BC)
- Capilano Mall (BC)
- Capilano River (BC)
- Capilano River Regional Park (BC)
- Capilano Suspension Bridge (BC)

Institutions

- Capilano University (BC)
- Capilano RFC, a rugby union club (BC)

People

- Capilano Herald Extraordinary, a position at the Canadian Heraldic Authority
- Joe Capilano, a Squamish chief from the area of the BC location, and its namesake

Political ridings

- Capilano (electoral district), a defunct federal electoral district (BC)
- Coast—Capilano, a defunct federal electoral district (BC)
- Capilano—Howe Sound, a defunct federal electoral district (BC)
- North Vancouver-Capilano, a defunct provincial electoral district (BC)
- North Vancouver-Capilano, a federal electoral district (BC)
- West Vancouver-Capilano, a provincial electoral district (BC)

Companies

- Capilano Honey, leading brand of honey in Australia, named after Capilano in BC

Places

- Capilano Transit Centre (AB)
