= Joe Capilano =

Squamish leader

- Sa7plek
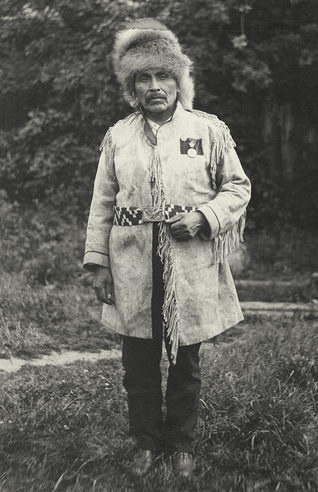

Squamish leader

Personal details
- Born: c. 1854 Yekw’ts, near Squamish, British Columbia
- Died: 10 March 1910 North Vancouver
- Cause of death: Tuberculosis
- Known for: Meeting with King Edward VII of Canada about land claims; traditional stories

Joe Capilano (c. 1854–1910), also known as Joe Mathias, was a leader of the Squamish from 1895 to 1910, who was called Sa7plek (Sahp-luk). He fought for the recognition of native rights and lifestyle.

He spent his youth fishing and hunting and was famous for fighting against the wildly invading Lekwiltok warriors from the Kwakwaka'wakw Territory. He went to work in the sawmill at Moodyville, a pioneer settlement in what is now the Lower Lonsdale area of the city of North Vancouver.

In 1906, he, along with Cowichan Chief Charley Isipaymilt and Secwepemc Chief Basil David, traveled to Ottawa, then after that, London, to meet with King of Canada Edward VII to speak of the need to settle land claims in British Columbia. The Chief also asked for the ban against potlatches to be lifted. Joe Capilano died of tuberculosis in 1910.

== Legacy ==
Several landmarks on Vancouver's North Shore share his name, which in the original Skwxwu7mesh snichim is Giyeplénexw, approximately Kiapilanough, where "Kiap" is the name of a hereditary chieftaincy and "-lanough" means "people of"; his formal title in that language is TE Kiapila'noq. Among these, in addition to Capilano Indian Reserve No. 5 (Xwemelch'stn, historically anglicized as Homulchesan), are the Capilano River, Capilano Lake, one of the sources of Vancouver's water supply, and Capilano Mountain, which lies at the head of the river's drainage basin. Capilano Road, a major arterial road, takes its name from its course along the east side of the river, from the Capilano Reserve to the base of the tramway up to the Grouse Mountain ski resort. Capilano Road's intersection with Marine Drive is immediately east of the northern ramps of the Lions Gate Bridge. Capilano University, opened on September 10, 1968, in North Vancouver, is named after him after being selected from submissions made by North Shore residents. The neighbourhood of North Vancouver around the upper end of Capilano Road is Capilano Highlands. The Capilano Suspension Bridge is also a popular site in North Vancouver.

"Legends of Vancouver," a collection of Coast Salish, particularly Squamish, stories by Pauline Johnson, a Canadian poet of Mohawk origin, was based on Capilano's tales.

== See also ==
- Capilano (disambiguation)
- Dan George
- History of Squamish and Tsleil-Waututh longshoremen, 1863-1963
- August Jack Khatsahlano
- Xwemelch'stn

== Bibliography ==
- Barman, Jean. Stanley Park's Secrets. Harbour Publishing, 2005. ISBN 978-1-55017-420-5.
- Matthews, Major J. S. (1955). Conversations with Khahtsahlano 1932–1954. ASIN B0007K39O2.
- E. Johnson, Pauline. Legends of Vancouver. IndyPublish.com (March 28, 2005). ISBN 978-1-4142-4792-2.
