= Edgemont Village =

Neighbourhood of Upper Capilano, BC, Canada

Coordinates: 49.337515°N 123.101917°W

Edgemont Village is a neighbourhood and main settlement of Upper Capilano in British Columbia, Canada. Within the District of North Vancouver, is situated between several converging suburbs, centring on the intersection of Edgemont Boulevard and Highland Boulevard, where it is a minor residential and commercial centre for local communities. According to the District of North Vancouver's Official Community Plan, Edgemont Village encompasses the shops and tenements along and immediately surrounding Edgemont Boulevard between West Queens Road and Ridgewood Drive. However, it is broadly recognized as taking up much of the hillside plateau between the Mackay and Mosquito creeks, bordering Ridgewood Drive to the north and the Upper Levels Highway to the south.

While the City of North Vancouver continues to be the North Shore's primary commercial and residential center, Edgemont Village serves as a village centre for its surrounding neighbourhoods. It is one of six such village centres (Lions Gate, Edgemont, Queensdale, Maplewood, Parkgate, and Deep Cove) in the District of North Vancouver. The area is also home to many examples of mid-century "west coast modernism" architecture.

== Local business ==
Edgemont's commercial core consists of many small or local businesses and services to meet most daily needs; a range of eclectic shops; and district amenities, including the North Vancouver District Public Library (Capilano Branch) and Highlands United Church.

As reported in 2015, around 80% of businesses in the 3 block community are owned by women (58 out of 72), though the landscape has undergone significant development over the past decade. In an interview with North Shore News, Marlene Tate, the owner of the artificial flower store 'Trims' which has been in the Village for 26 years, spoke of the community of Edgemont Village:

“We run the village as mothers, basically. Every woman who owns a business runs it as if it’s her home ... All the women get together and figure out how to make the Village safe. We put money toward traffic safety and crossing guards.”

== Transportation ==
Along with the rest of the district, much of the development in Edgemont Village has occurred primarily in the 1950s and 60s, and so has largely been autocentric. Despite recent projects having consisted of mixed-use development and pedestrian oriented infrastructure, vehicles remain the primary method of transportation within and without the district, especially for commuters residing in any one of the several bedroom communities which converge upon the village, wherefore Edgemont is the only such village center in this North-West quadrant of the district. Nevertheless, the area is still served relatively well by several TransLink bus routes; 232 (Phibbs Exchange to Grouse Mountain) and 246 (Downtown to Marine & Capilano) pass through the Village.

Translink's North Shore Area Transit Plan identifies a possible frequent transit service (with frequencies of at least 15 minutes or less, all day, every day) to connect Park Royal and Lynn Valley via Edgemont Village.

== Recreation ==
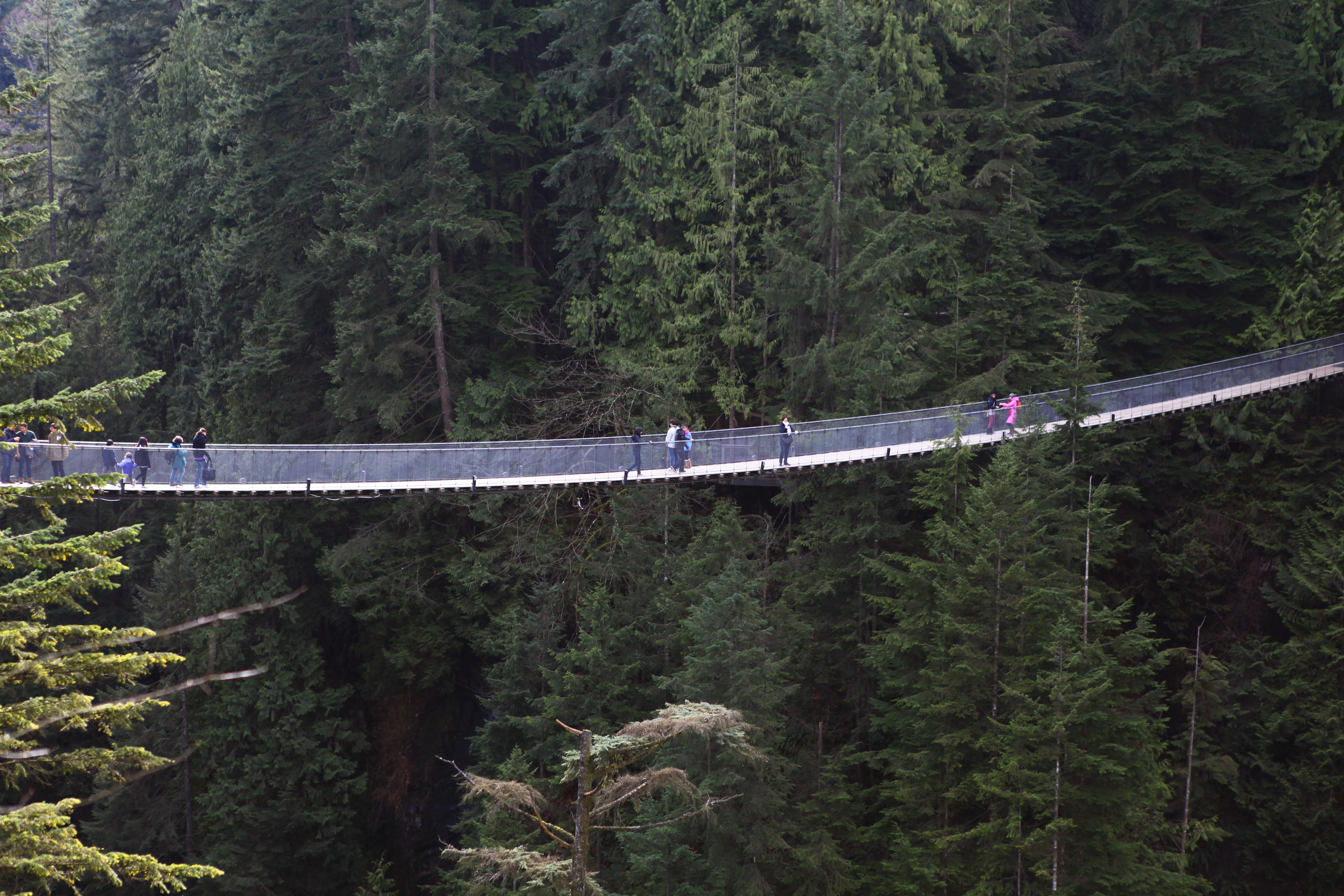
The Capilano Suspension Bridge in 2012

Edgemont Village is located near several destinations on the North Shore, including the Capilano Suspension Bridge, the Capilano Salmon Hatchery, Delbrook Community Recreation Centre, Cleveland Dam, and Grouse Mountain. The village is also surrounded on three sides by forested parks, and so connects directly to several trails and other such outdoor spaces, including tennis and pickle courts, a duck pond, and several creeks.

== Notable events ==
=== 1966 Halloween riots ===
On Halloween Night 1966, thousands of teenagers from the Vancouver area congregated in Edgemont Village (then called the Capilano Highlands Shopping Centre). Rioters threw beer bottles and eggs resulting in the smashing of 45 storefront windows, causing a total of $75,000 CAD in damages
