= Edward Mahon =

Edward Mahon (1862–1937) was born in Rawmarsh, England to Sir William Vesey Ross Mahon (1813–1893), who became Fourth Baronet in 1852, but chose not to abandon his Yorkshire parish in favour of Castlegar, the ancestral Mahon family residence in County Galway, Ireland.

== Early life ==
Mahon and his siblings thus grew up in England. He was educated at Marlborough College and Exeter College, Oxford, where he obtained a degree in law in 1884. He opened practice in Dublin, but was not satisfied with his chosen profession.

== Career ==
The Mahon clan had been influential in Anglo-Irish politics, but the real impetus to greater fame was provided by John Ross Mahon (1814–1887), Sir William's younger brother. He was a very successful land agent and founding partner in Guinness Mahon, a merchant bank. When he died a bachelor in 1887, his very substantial personal wealth as well as his interest in the bank passed on to his protégé, John FitzGerald Mahon (1858–1942), an older brother of Edward. Following an exploratory world trip, John settled on the Vancouver area of British Columbia as a suitable place for investment, and delegated Edward to look after his business interests there. Edward arrived in October 1890, and soon gravitated to the opportunities for growth on the north shore of Burrard Inlet, as well mining opportunities in the West Kootenay region.

== Investments ==
In 1891, he purchased a pre-emption from Albert McCleary near the confluence of the Columbia and Kootenay rivers, and on it, platted a town-site that he named Castlegar, in honour of his ancestral home in Ireland. He sought out a partnership for its development with Augustus Heinze, who was in 1897 constructing his Columbia & Western Railway northward from his Trail smelter operation. Edward's plans for a showcase Kootenay city collapsed when Heinze sold out all his interests to the CPR early in 1898, and the railway effectively blocked the development of his city in favour of Nelson. Heinze retreated to his operational base in Butte, Montana, and later New York, where he was instrumental in precipitating the financial Panic of 1907.

Edward’s most profitable investment in the West Kootenay was with his early acquisition of the Vancouver Group of mining claims near Silverton. By the mid-1890s he was joined in the mining ventures by his younger brother Gilbert Mahon (1865–1947), with John FitzGerald Mahon occasionally participating as well. By 1898 Edward’s interests had shifted fully to what would become the North Vancouver city and district. He was now living in a new house, built on the corner of Burrard and Hastings streets in Vancouver. It became a social centre of Vancouver, and served Edward for thirty years before it was demolished in 1929 to make room for the Marine Building. During this period Edward was involved in many enterprises which marketed real estate, promoted development, provided financing, and managed properties for absentee landowners. His associations included: the North Vancouver Land & Improvement Company; Mahon, McFarland & Mahon; ownership of forested lands in the Capilano valley as well as the Capilano Suspension Bridge; development of the West Lake ski area on Hollyburn Ridge, and support of plans for an astronomical telescope for Grouse Mountain.

== Personal life ==
He married Lilette Rebbeck (1889–1956) in 1911; she was 28 years junior and very talented artistically, being an early student of Emily Carr, and a later mover in the Art in Living movement, which brought her into close association with C. E. (Ned) Pratt, B. C. Binning, Charles H. Scott, Fred Amess, and Jack Shadbolt. The couple had one son, Bryan (1913–2005), who was attracted to aviation at an early age, and pursued a distinguished career with Boeing Aviation in Seattle. This mirrored the family situation of his patron brother John FitzGerald, whose only son Denis Mahon (1910–2011) turned his back on his father's banking enterprise to become an authority on Italian Baroque art and a generous supporter of the Art Fund.

Edward died in 1937, having lost much of his fortune in the stock market collapse and the Great Depression that followed.

== Recognition ==
Edward Mahon is remembered as a visionary developer and philanthropist. His enduring legacy is the Green Necklace: the circle of preserved green spaces, boulevards, and parks that encircles the city core of North Vancouver. That concept has been adopted by the city as an integral part of the official community plan. Mahon Avenue in North Vancouver is named after him, as is Mahon Park, on land he had donated for that purpose. An exhibit on his life and legacy was displayed in Castlegar BC in 2012, and a variation of it was produced for a permanent display by the City of North Vancouver.
