= Metro Vancouver Regional District =

Regional district in British Columbia, Canada

Metro Vancouver
- Regional district
- Metro Vancouver Regional District
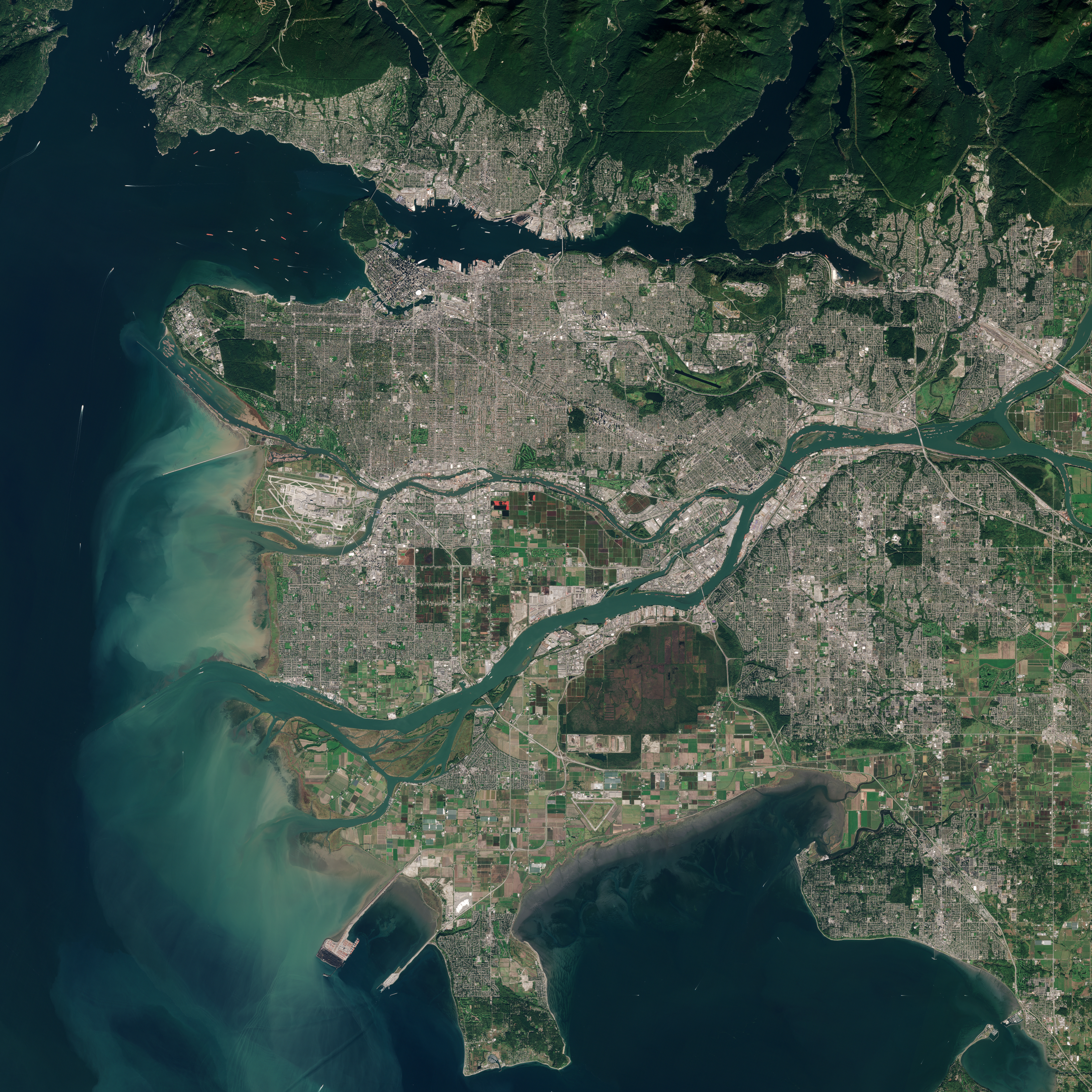
- Satellite image of Metro Vancouver

- Flag Logo

- Major communities

- Location in British Columbia
- Country: Canada
- Province: British Columbia
- Incorporated: 29 June 1967
- Name change: 13 June 1968
- Name change: 30 January 2017
- Administrative office: Burnaby
- Electoral Areas: A

Government
  - Type: Regional district
  - Body: Board of Directors
  - Chair: Mike Hurley (Burnaby)
  - Vice chair: John McEwen (Anmore)

Area (2021)
  - Land: 2,878.93 km^{2} (1,111.56 sq mi)
- Highest elevation: 1,990 m (6,530 ft)
- Lowest elevation: 0 m (0 ft)

Population (2021)
  - Total: 2,642,825
  - Estimate (2024): 3,108,926
  - Rank: 2nd (Canadian CD)
  - Density: 918/km^{2} (2,380/sq mi)
  - Rank: 2nd (Canadian CD)
- Demonym: Metro Vancouverite

GDP (nominal, 2022)
  - Total: CA$202.459 billion
- Time zone: UTC−07:00 (Pacific Time)
- Area codes: 604 / 778 / 236 / 672
- Website: metrovancouver.org

The Metro Vancouver Regional District (MVRD), or simply Metro Vancouver, is a Canadian political subdivision and corporate entity representing the metropolitan area of Greater Vancouver, designated by provincial legislation as one of the 28 regional districts in British Columbia. The organization was known as the Regional District of Fraser–Burrard for nearly one year upon incorporating in 1967, and as the Greater Vancouver Regional District (GVRD) from 1968 to 2017.

Metro Vancouver borders Whatcom County, Washington, to the south, the Fraser Valley Regional District to the east, the Squamish-Lillooet Regional District to the north, the Nanaimo Regional District and Cowichan Valley Regional District across the Strait of Georgia to the west, and the Sunshine Coast across Howe Sound to the northwest.

The MVRD is under the direction of 23 local authorities and delivers regional services, sets policy and acts as a political forum. The regional district's most populous city is Vancouver, and Metro Vancouver's administrative offices are located in the city of Burnaby. The MVRD's boundaries match those of the Vancouver census metropolitan area (CMA) as identified by Statistics Canada.

== History ==
The Greater Vancouver Water District and the Greater Vancouver Sewerage and Drainage District were established in 1924 and 1956 respectively. The Government of British Columbia incorporated a regional district for this western portion of the Lower Mainland named the "Regional District of Fraser-Burrard" on 29 June 1967. Just under a year later, the regional district was renamed the "Greater Vancouver Regional District" (GVRD) on 13 June 1968.

In 2007, the GVRD applied to change its official legal name a second time to simply "Metro Vancouver", which was deemed more recognizable at the time. British Columbia's Minister of Community Services denied the application due to the absence of the term "regional district" within the proposed new name, though it was suggested that the GVRD could brand itself under the unofficial name of Metro Vancouver. After nine years, with growing public recognition of Metro Vancouver, the overall success of the brand, and confusion between the brand and the official legal name of the regional district, the GVRD moved in 2016 to change its name to the "Metro Vancouver Regional District". The regional district was therefore formally renamed a second time by the Government of British Columbia on 30 January 2017, becoming the "Metro Vancouver Regional District".

== Geography ==
The Metro Vancouver Regional District (MVRD) is located east of the Strait of Georgia and north of the State of Washington and is bisected by the Fraser River. The boundaries of the MVRD match those of the Vancouver CMA.

== Membership ==
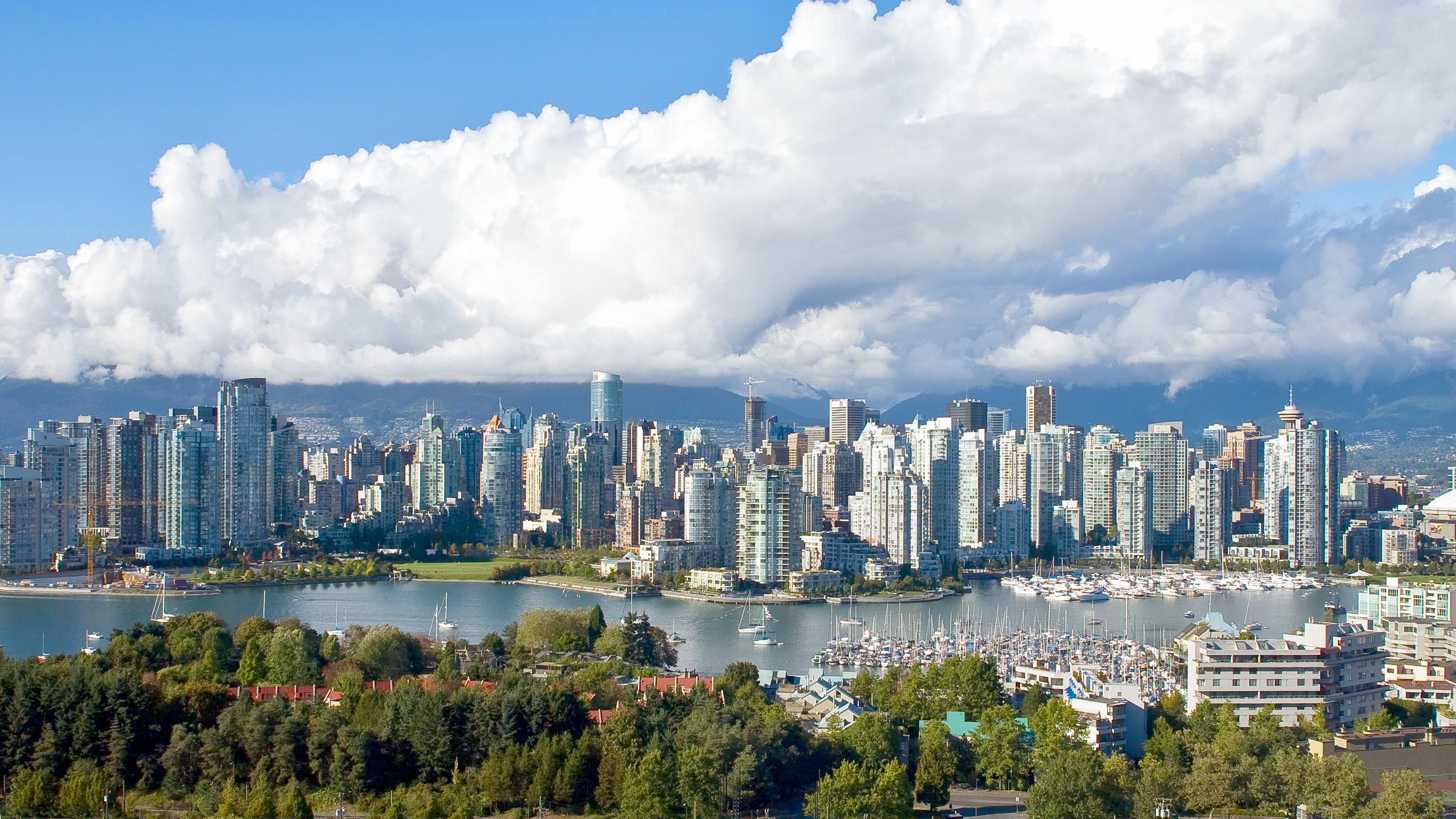
With 662,248 residents recorded in the 2021 census, Vancouver is the most populated city in British Columbia and Metro Vancouver.

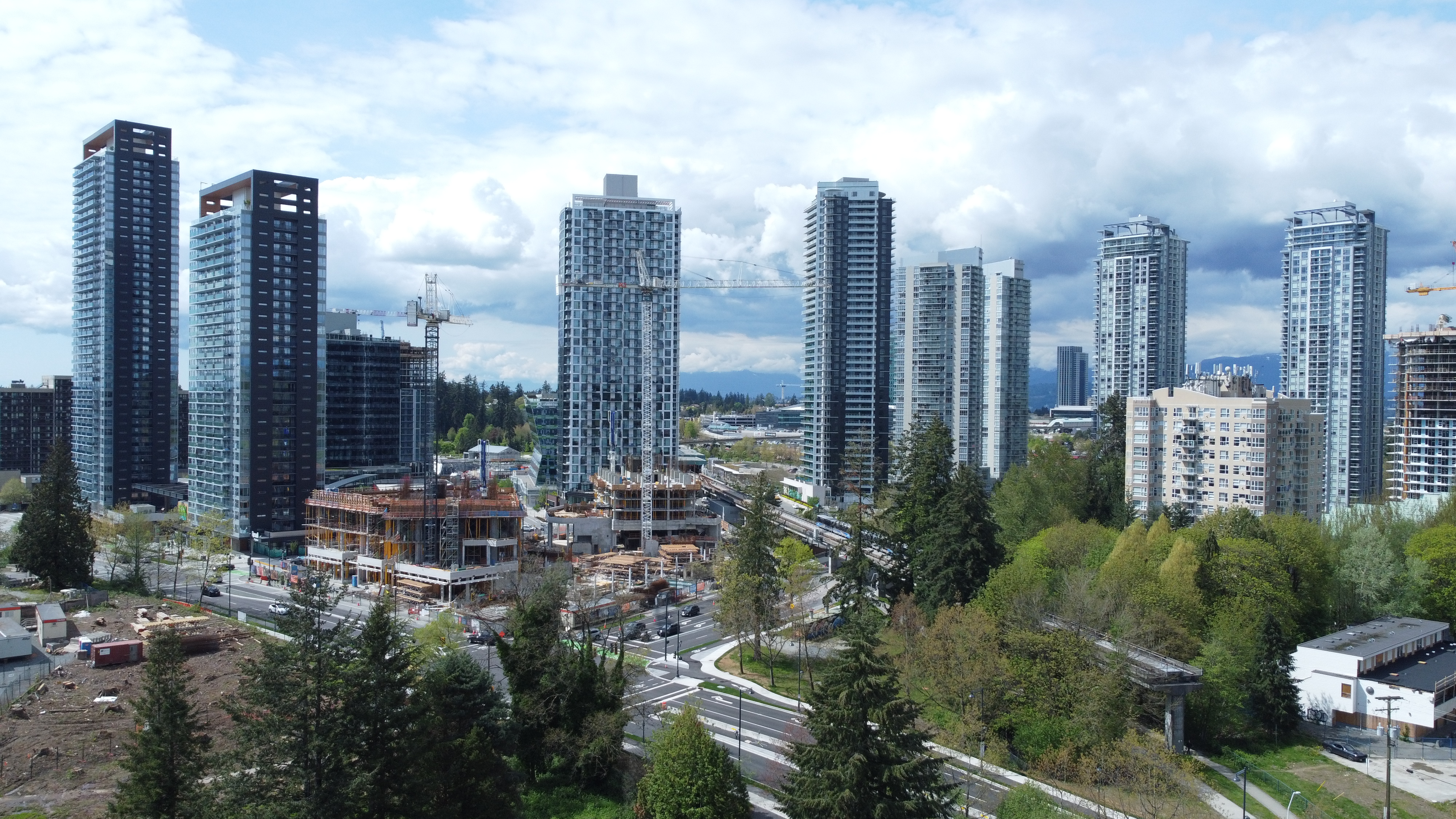
With a population of 568,322 (2021), Surrey is the second-most populated city in Metro Vancouver.

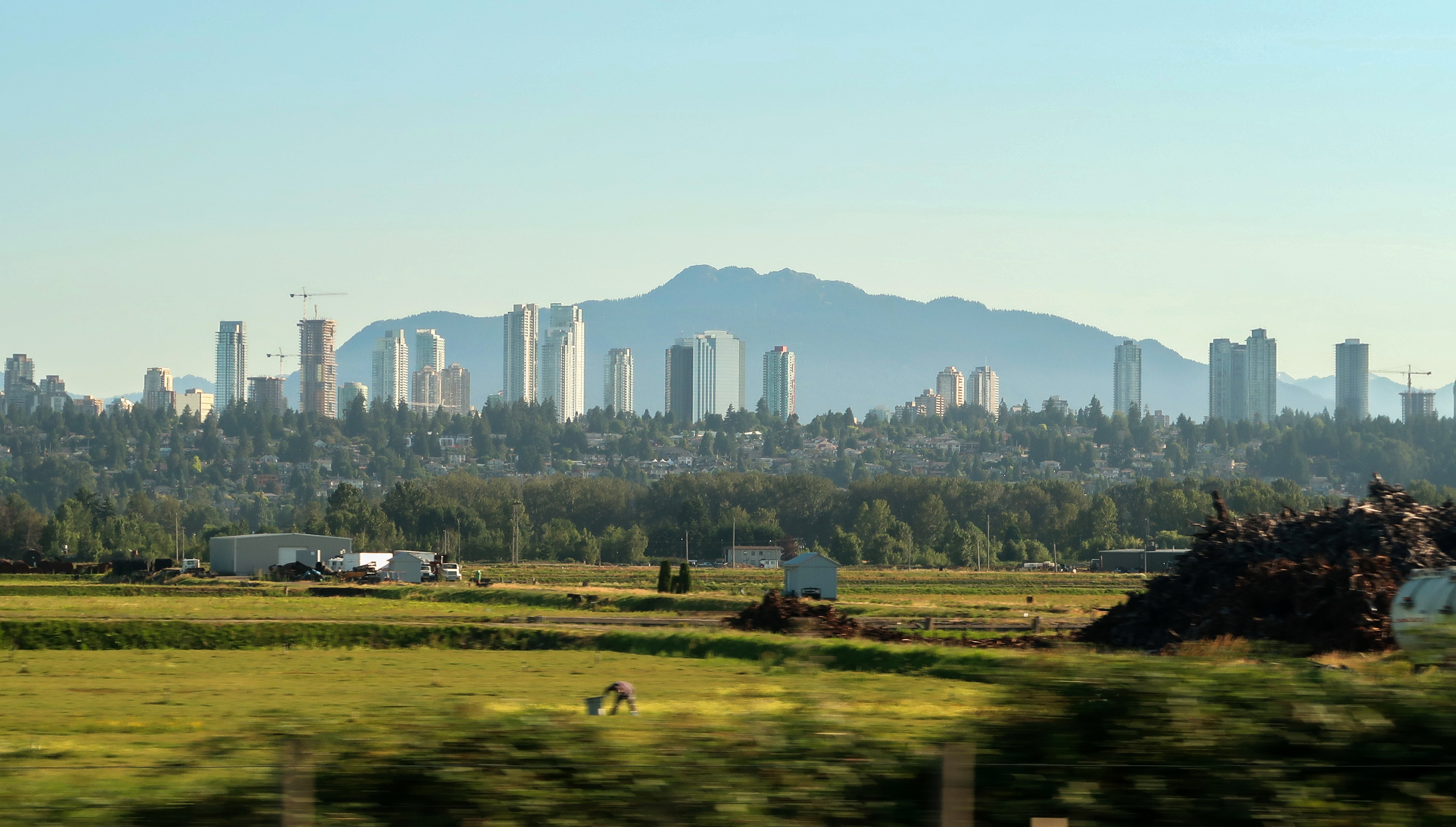
Burnaby is the third-most populated city in Metro Vancouver with a population of 249,125 (2021).

This regional district comprises 23 local authorities as members: 21 municipalities, one electoral area and one treaty First Nation.

Metro Vancouver member populations
Member	Census subdivision	Population (2021)	Population (2016)	% change (2016–2021)	2021 provincial rank
Anmore	Village	2,356	2,210	+6.6%	185th
Belcarra	Village	687	643	+6.8%	301st
Bowen Island	Island municipality	4,256	3,680	+15.7%	118th
Burnaby	City	249,125	232,755	+7.0%	3rd
Coquitlam	City	148,625	139,284	+6.7%	6th
Delta	City	108,455	102,238	+6.1%	10th
City of Langley	City	28,963	25,888	+11.9%	30th
Township of Langley	District municipality	132,603	117,285	+13.1%	8th
Lions Bay	Village	1,390	1,334	+4.2%	251st
Maple Ridge	City	90,990	82,256	+10.6%	15th
Metro Vancouver A	Regional district electoral area	18,612	16,133	+15.4%	39th
New Westminster	City	78,916	70,996	+11.2%	17th
City of North Vancouver	City	58,120	52,898	+9.9%	20th
District of North Vancouver	District municipality	88,168	85,649	+2.9%	16th
Pitt Meadows	City	19,146	18,573	+3.1%	37th
Port Coquitlam	City	61,498	58,612	+4.9%	19th
Port Moody	City	33,535	33,551	±0.0%	28th
Richmond	City	209,937	198,309	+5.9%	4th
Surrey	City	568,322	517,887	+9.7%	2nd
Tsawwassen	First Nation	2,256	816	+176.5%	191st
Vancouver	City	662,248	631,486	+4.9%	1st
West Vancouver	District municipality	44,122	42,473	+3.9%	23rd
White Rock	City	21,939	19,952	+10.0%	33rd
Metro Vancouver		2,642,825	2,463,431	+7.3%	–
Source: Statistics Canada; Metro Vancouver Regional District

Electoral Area A comprises all unincorporated land within the regional district boundaries, which totals about 818 square kilometres. Most of the area is in the northernmost part of the district, including residential areas and isolated dwellings on Howe Sound between Lions Bay and Horseshoe Bay, on Indian Arm to the north of Deep Cove and Belcarra/Anmore and on the west side of Pitt Lake to the north of Port Coquitlam. Other areas included are Barnston Island on the Fraser River, Passage Island between Bowen Island and West Vancouver, and finally the urban communities of the University of British Columbia campus and the University Endowment Lands, in which 98% of the population of Electoral Area A lives.

There are also seventeen First Nations reserves within the geographical area of Metro Vancouver, with a combined population of 7,550 as of 2006. While reserves are not subject to Metro Vancouver by-laws, people living on reserve are still eligible to vote in local and Electoral Area A elections and therefore help select the Metro Vancouver board of directors.

The cities of Abbotsford and Chilliwack and the district of Mission, located to the east, although often linked to Vancouver in promotions and tourism, are part of a separate regional district, the Fraser Valley Regional District.

== Demographics ==
Metro Vancouver
Year	Pop.	±%
1891	21,887	—
1901	42,926	+96.1%
1911	164,020	+282.1%
1921	232,597	+41.8%
1931	347,709	+49.5%
1941	393,898	+13.3%
1951	562,462	+42.8%
1961	790,741	+40.6%
1971	1,028,334	+30.0%
1981	1,169,831	+13.8%
1991	1,602,590	+37.0%
1996	1,831,665	+14.3%
2001	1,986,965	+8.5%
2006	2,116,581	+6.5%
2011	2,313,328	+9.3%
2016	2,463,431	+6.5%
2021	2,642,825	+7.3%

As a census division in the 2021 Canadian census conducted by Statistics Canada, the Metro Vancouver Regional District had a population of 2,642,825 living in 1,043,319 of its 1,104,532 total private dwellings, a change of 7.3% from its 2016 population of 2,463,431. With a land area of 2,878.93 km^{2} (1,111.56 sq mi), it had a population density of 918.0/km^{2} (2,377.6/sq mi) in 2021. The Metro Vancouver Regional District is the densest and most populous regional district in British Columbia, and the second-densest and second-most populous census division in Canada behind Toronto.

Panethnic groups in the Metro Vancouver Regional District (2001–2021)
Panethnic group	2021		2016		2011		2006		2001	
Panethnic group	Pop.	%	Pop.	%	Pop.	%	Pop.	%	Pop.	%
European (Note: 2001–2016: Statistic includes all persons that did not make up part of a visible minority or an indigenous identity.) (Note: 2021: Statistic includes all persons belonging to the non-indigenous and non-visible minority "White" population group.)	1,124,475	43.13%	1,179,100	48.6%	1,197,985	52.53%	1,182,355	56.36%	1,204,970	61.24%
East Asian (Note: Statistic includes total responses of "Chinese", "Korean", and "Japanese" under visible minority section on census.)	606,920	23.28%	557,745	22.99%	488,240	21.41%	451,790	21.53%	395,540	20.1%
South Asian	369,295	14.17%	291,005	11.99%	252,405	11.07%	207,165	9.87%	164,365	8.35%
Southeast Asian (Note: Statistic includes total responses of "Filipino" and "Southeast Asian" under visible minority section on census.)	198,940	7.63%	168,075	6.93%	156,315	6.85%	112,365	5.36%	85,485	4.34%
Middle Eastern (Note: Statistic includes total responses of "West Asian" and "Arab" under visible minority section on census.)	87,090	3.34%	62,440	2.57%	48,870	2.14%	35,590	1.7%	27,340	1.39%
Indigenous	63,345	2.43%	61,455	2.53%	52,375	2.3%	40,310	1.92%	36,855	1.87%
Latin American	51,500	1.98%	34,805	1.43%	29,125	1.28%	22,695	1.08%	18,715	0.95%
African	41,180	1.58%	29,830	1.23%	23,545	1.03%	20,670	0.99%	18,405	0.94%
Other/Multiracial (Note: Statistic includes total responses of "Visible minority, n.i.e." and "Multiple visible minorities" under visible minority section on census.)	65,350	2.51%	41,780	1.72%	31,835	1.4%	25,035	1.19%	15,810	0.8%
Total responses	2,607,015	98.65%	2,426,235	98.49%	2,280,695	98.59%	2,097,965	99.12%	1,967,480	99.02%
Total population	2,642,825	100%	2,463,431	100%	2,313,328	100%	2,116,581	100%	1,986,965	100%
Note: Totals greater than 100% due to multiple origin responses

== Governance ==
Metro Vancouver technically comprises four separate corporate entities: the Metro Vancouver Regional District (MVRD), the Greater Vancouver Sewerage and Drainage District (GVS&DD), the Greater Vancouver Water District (GVWD) and the Metro Vancouver Housing Corporation (MVHC). Each of these is governed by a board of directors. The board of the MVRD has 40 directors coming from the 23 local authorities who are MVRD members. The number of directors coming from each local authority is determined by population, and the number of votes allocated to each director further helps proportionally represent the population distribution of the region. Each board director is also an elected official of one of the local authorities, with the exception of the elected representative for Electoral Area A (which has no council).

As of 2017, the organization had about 1,500 employees. The current organizational structure shows ten departments reporting to the Chief Administrative Officer: Human Resources & Corporate Services; External Relations; Financial Services; Legal Services & Aboriginal Relations; Board & Information Services; Liquid Waste Services; Parks & Housing Services; Planning & Environment; Solid Waste Services; and Water Services.

== Administrative role ==
The principal function of Metro Vancouver is to administer resources and services which are common across the metropolitan area. The Metro Vancouver Board has defined its strategic priorities for 2015 through 2018 in its Board Strategic Plan.

The organization categorizes its work into action areas as described in the following subsections. However, 84% of the organization's budget is spent in three of those areas – the three utilities (water, liquid waste, solid waste). Metro Vancouver's commitments and its members' commitments to each action area are outlined in eight board-approved management plans as referenced below.

=== Water ===
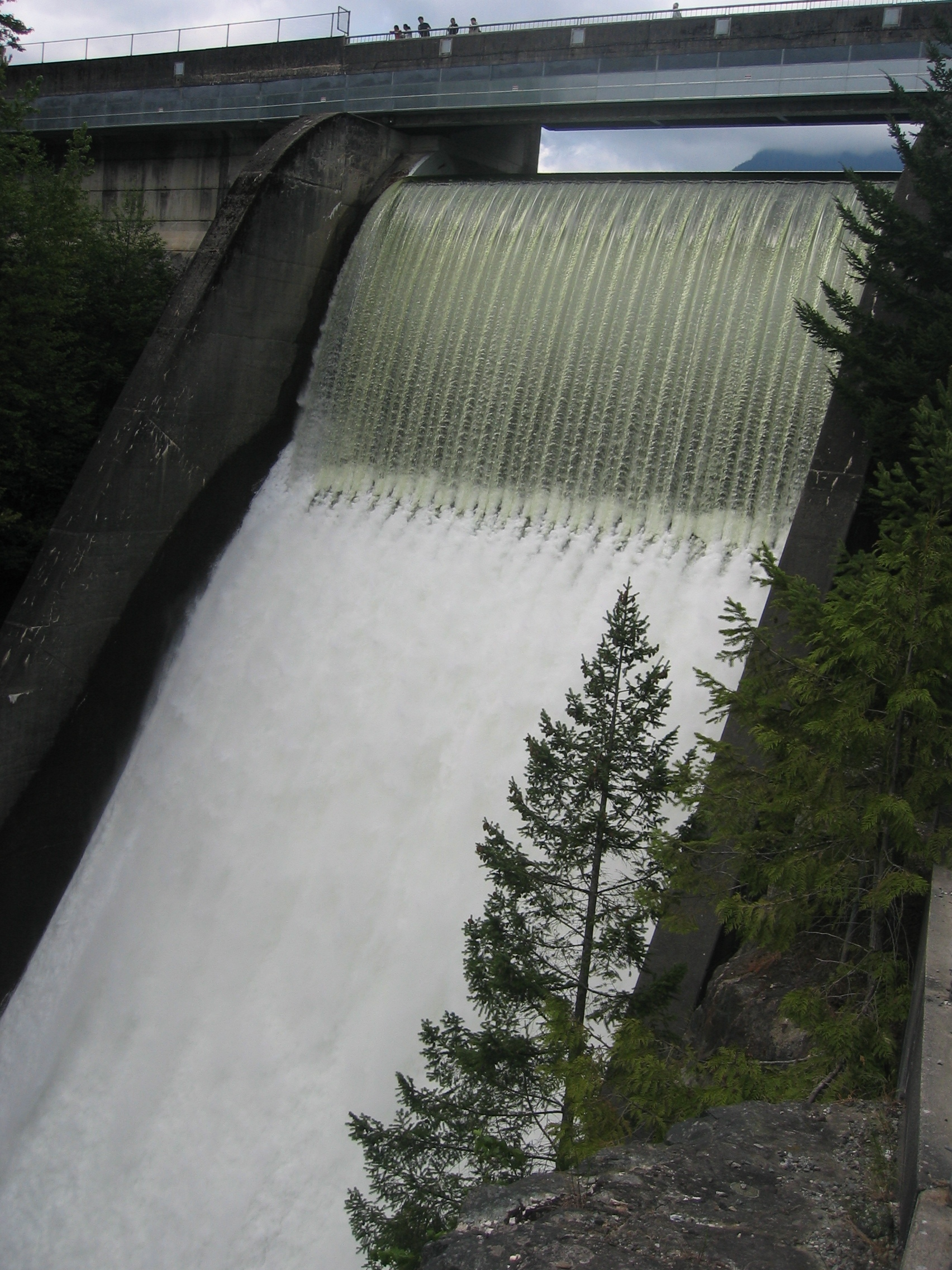
Metro Vancouver manages the Cleveland Dam, located in the District of North Vancouver. The dam is used to store portions of the Lower Mainland's drinking water.

Metro Vancouver's tap water is provided by four legal entities that operate under the name Metro Vancouver: the GVWD, the GVS&DD, the MVRD and MVHC. They collectively serve 2.8 million residents in the region and provide 1.5 billion litres (400,000,000 US gal) of water during peak summer days. The GVWD provides tap water to a land area covering more than 2,600 km² with all of the water coming from three sources: the Capilano reservoir, the Seymour reservoir and the Coquitlam reservoir. Metro Vancouver controls the Cleveland Dam on the Capilano reservoir, which supplies 40 percent of the district's water. The system includes 26 storage tanks, 19 pump stations, and 520 kilometres (320 mi) of water mains.

=== Liquid waste ===
Metro Vancouver operates and maintains the liquid waste facility, which includes managing "the network of trunk sewers, pumping stations and wastewater treatment plants that connect with municipal sewer systems". Throughout operations, the organization is committed to protecting public health and the environment, and recovering as much resources (energy, nutrients, etc.) as possible out of the waste stream.

The liquid waste utility is committed to the goals and strategies in the Integrated Liquid Waste and Resource Management plan, as approved by the board. The three goals are to:

- Protect public health and the environment
- Use liquid waste as a resource
- Effective, affordable and collaborative management

=== Solid waste ===
Metro Vancouver's solid waste utility is committed to the goals and strategies in the Integrated Solid Waste and Resource Management plan, as approved by the board. The four goals are to:

- Minimize waste generation
- Maximize reuse, recycling and material recovery
- Recover energy from the waste stream after material recycling
- Dispose of all waste in landfill after material recycling and energy recovery

One initiative of the organization was the Ashcroft Manor Ranch Mega-Landfill Proposal in Ashcroft, British Columbia, in the Thompson Country of the British Columbia Interior, as there is no more room in the Lower Mainland for Metro Vancouver's garbage. A similar project nearby adjacent to the town of Cache Creek, British Columbia has almost reached capacity. Environmental concerns about the area's sensitive shrub–steppe climate and ecology are strong, while Highland Valley Copper, near Logan Lake, has offered the use of its mine-pit instead. Other MVRD landfill locations serving the regional district in the past have been in the Fraser Mills area, between the Trans-Canada Highway and the Fraser, and at Port Mann, beneath the south foot of the Port Mann Bridge.

=== Housing ===
Metro Vancouver owns and manages housing complexes throughout the region via the Metro Vancouver Housing Corporation (MVHC); it also forms policy on homelessness and affordable housing for the region. The MVHC's board-approved goals, as outlined in the Affordable Housing Strategy, are to:

- Expand the supply and diversity of housing to meet a variety of needs
- Expand the rental supply and balance preservation of existing stock with redevelopment while supporting existing tenants
- Meet housing demand estimates for very low and low income earners
- Increase the rental housing supply along the frequent transit network
- End homelessness in the region

The MVHC's sole shareholder is the Metro Vancouver Regional District. The number of directors of the housing corporation is 13.

=== Regional planning ===
Metro Vancouver works in collaboration with its members to achieve a shared vision of livability across the generations, as laid out in the Regional Growth Strategy (RGS), which was approved by the board in 2011, replacing the Livable Region Strategic Plan (LRSP). The RGS requires each member local authority to provide a Regional Context Statement to "demonstrate to the Metro Vancouver Board how its Official Community Plan Supports the RGS." The five goals of the RGS are to:

- Create a compact urban area
- Support a sustainable economy
- Protect the environment and respond to climate change impacts
- Develop complete communities
- Support sustainable transportation choices

Regional planning also includes planning and policy-making in agriculture and the food industry. The organization is committed to the goals and strategies in the Regional Food System Strategy, as approved by the board. The goals are to:

- Increase capacity to produce food close to home
- Improve the financial viability of the food sector
- Have people make healthy and sustainable food choices
- Provide everyone with access to healthy, culturally diverse and affordable food
- Maintain a food system consistent with ecological health

In 2018, the organization's board also adopted the Ecological Health Framework, which encapsulates Metro Vancouver’s collective efforts around ecological health and provides guiding principles, goals, and strategies to help achieve the vision of a "beautiful, healthy, and resilient environment for current and future generations." The goals are:

- Goal 1: Build ecological resilience and minimize impacts
- Goal 2: Protect natural areas and conserve ecosystem services
- Goal 3: Nurture nature within communities

=== Air quality ===
The organization runs programs and set policy to protect public health and the environment with respect to air quality, improve visual air quality and minimize the region's contribution to climate change. The organization is committed to the goals and strategies in the Integrated Air Quality and Greenhouse Gas Management Plan, as approved by the board. The three goals are to:

- Protect public health and the environment
- Improve visual air quality
- Minimize the region's contribution to global climate change

=== Regional parks ===
The parks department of Metro Vancouver oversees the development and maintenance of 23 regional parks, as well as various nature reserves and greenways. The organization is committed to the goals and strategies in the Regional Parks Plan, as approved by the board. The four goals are to:

- Promote ecological health
- Promote outdoor recreation for human health and wellness
- Support community stewardship, education and stewardships
- Promote philanthropy and economic opportunities

Regional parks are distinct from municipal parks in that they are typically more "wild" and represent unique geographical zones within the region, such as bogs and mature rainforests.

=== Regional economic prosperity ===
Regional economic prosperity is a service of Metro Vancouver organized to advance a shared prosperity in the region. The service is structured around three functions: fostering collaboration, conducting regional data collection and research, and attracting investment.

=== Regional federation ===
Metro Vancouver undertakes support functions that underpin the rest of its service areas. In these areas, the organization commits to "contribute to the effective and efficient performance of our regional roles through leadership and collaboration with our members and other stakeholders." There are eight strategic directions guiding work in this area:

- Livable and sustainable region: Use livability and sustainability objectives to guide Metro Vancouver services and operations.
- Effective federation: Strengthen the alignment of member and regional objectives.
- Public education: Increase Metro Vancouver's profile by leveraging events and news related to regional services.
- Engagement: Enhance relationships between Metro Vancouver and other orders of government, First Nations and stakeholders.
- Regional transportation: Advocate the merits of integrating regional land use and transportation planning.
- Regional prosperity: Clarify and strengthen Metro Vancouver's role in pursuing a collaborative approach to regional prosperity.
- Emergency preparedness: Collaborate with stakeholders to prepare for major emergencies.
- Fiscal responsibility: Use value for service to guide Metro Vancouver operations and service provision.

The organization's board has also adopted the Corporate Climate Action Plan, the purpose of which is to, "set out strategies and actions to achieve Metro Vancouver's commitment to corporate carbon neutrality and to adapt [its] corporate infrastructure and activities to the anticipated consequences of climate change." The strategies of the plan are to:

- Reduce energy consumption
- Switch to renewable energy
- Maximize energy recovery
- Sequester and remove carbon
- Adapt existing infrastructure and operations
- Plan and build resilient new infrastructure and facilities

== See also ==
- Greater Vancouver
- Greater Victoria, British Columbia
  - Capital Regional District
