= Capilano (North Vancouver) =

Neighbourhood in British Columbia, Canada

Coordinates: 49.34836°N 123.11059°W

Capilano is a community in British Columbia, Canada. Located on the Burrard Inlet's North Shore, North of Vancouver, it comprises Upper and Lower Capilano within the District of North Vancouver. As its 'western gateway', located at the edge of the Pacific Temperate Rainforest, Upper Capilano is home to the forest's namesake Capilano Suspension Bridge, the region's largest tourist attraction, while urban Lower Capilano along Marine Drive connects the rest of the North Shore to Vancouver to the South via the Lions Gate Bridge.

Represented along with its Eastern neighbour as North Vancouver-Capilano for federal purposes and Western neighbour as West Vancouver-Capilano at the provincial level, it is primarily composed of low density single family residential (RS), but contains a small amount of low density multi-family residential (RM) along arterial roads.

== History ==
Throughout the 1880s, the Capilano Road that forms the backbone of this neighbourhood was built. However at that time, it was mostly uninhabited. From the 1940s through to the 1960s, low density housing was built, and the neighbourhood was established. Development continued up the hill through the 1980s and 1990s, but those areas are under different neighbourhood names.

== Boundary and location ==
The neighbourhood of Upper Capilano is accepted to encompass much of Capilano Road north of British Columbia Highway 1 (Upper Levels Highway) and south of Cleveland Dam, while Lions Gate/Lower Capilano sits to the South between the highway and the Capilano Indian Reserve No. 5 (also known as X̱wemelch'stn/Homulchesan of the area's indigenous Squamish Nation). The eastern boundary of this neighbourhood is Mackay Creek. Capilano is located directly at the western boundary of the District of North Vancouver. Directly to the east of Capilano is Edgemont Village as well as Canyon Heights.

Capilano is close to the commercial centre of Edgemont Village.

Capilano has an approximate size of 2.4 square kilometres (0.93 mi^{2}). The lowest elevation within the neighbourhood is 75m, and the highest is 180m. It is rather narrow; its widest point is only 1.12 km. It is 3 km in length.

=== Topography ===
Capilano follows the fall line of the lower reaches of Grouse Mountain. The land is sloped except for a few plateaus.

== Attractions ==
=== Parks ===
The Capilano Neighbourhood has the following notable parks:

- Capilano River Regional Park
- Murdo Frazer Park
- Eldon Park
- Cleveland Park

=== Tourist attractions ===
Capilano Suspension Bridge is a very popular tourist attraction. It is located within this neighbourhood.

== Schools ==
Capilano is located within School District 44 North Vancouver and contains the following schools:

- Handsworth Secondary School
- Highlands Elementary School (North Vancouver)
- Cleveland Elementary School

== Transit ==
Like other neighbourhoods within North Vancouver, Capilano is very auto-centric. However, it does have TransLink bus service on major roads. The extent of bus service includes:

- 236 along Capilano Road for much of its length
- 246 along Capilano Road from Ridgewood Drive and south
- 232 along Capilano Road from Edgemont Boulevard and north
- 247 (limited service) along the entire length of Capilano road
