= Ernest Albert Cleveland =

Canadian engineer

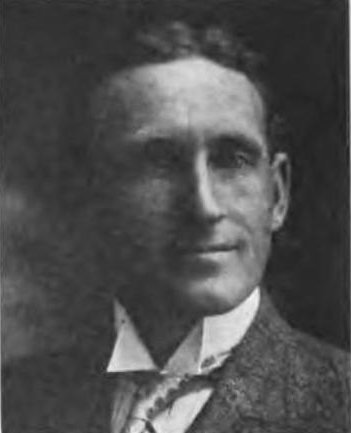
- Born: May 12, 1874; Alma, New Brunswick
- Died: January 8, 1952 (aged 77); North Vancouver, British Columbia
- Occupation: Water engineer

Ernest Albert Cleveland (May 12, 1874 – January 8, 1952) was a Canadian engineer and first commissioner of the Greater Vancouver Water District from 1926 to 1952.

The Cleveland Dam in North Vancouver is dedicated in his honour.

== Life ==
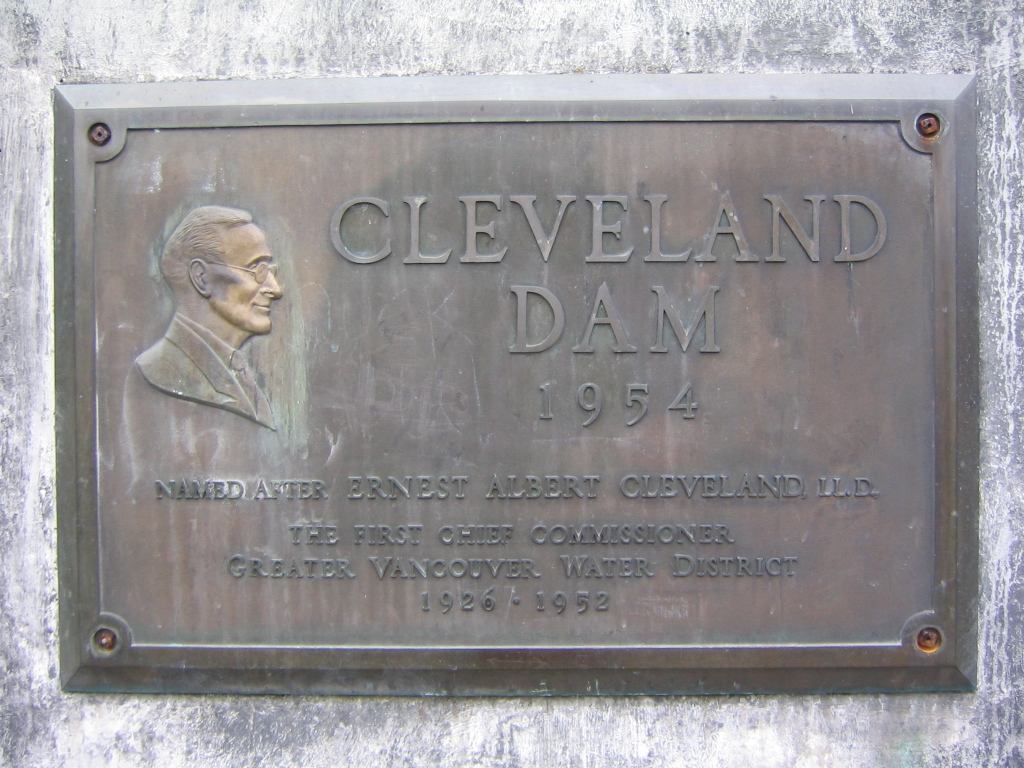
Dedication plaque at the Cleveland Dam

Ernest Albert Cleveland was born in Alma, New Brunswick, on May 12, 1874. He came to Vancouver in 1890, where he worked as a federal surveyor. He worked as an engineer after graduating from University of Washington. Cleveland and Cameron, an engineering and surveying firm, was opened by Cleveland. He was appointed the first chief commissioner of the Great Vancouver Water District. When he retired in 1940, his work was considered so important that special legislation was passed so he could keep working. He died on January 8, 1952, in North Vancouver, British Columbia. He is buried in Ocean View Burial Park in Burnaby.

With Sydney Williams, Captain Phil Thompson, R. Parkinson (a surveyor), and a Mr. Knox of Duncan, he was in the second party to climb Grouse Mountain, on October 12, 1894. On that trip they shot a blue grouse, giving the mountain its name. That party was the first to climb Dam Mountain: from the top of this mountain they could see the old waterworks dam on the Capilano River, hence the name. They then proceeded onto, and were the first to ascend Goat Mountain, where they shot two goats on the summit: "one of which was secured while the other took a tumble over the cliffs above Crown Pass after being wounded." He later named Mount Fromme.
