= Cleveland Dam =

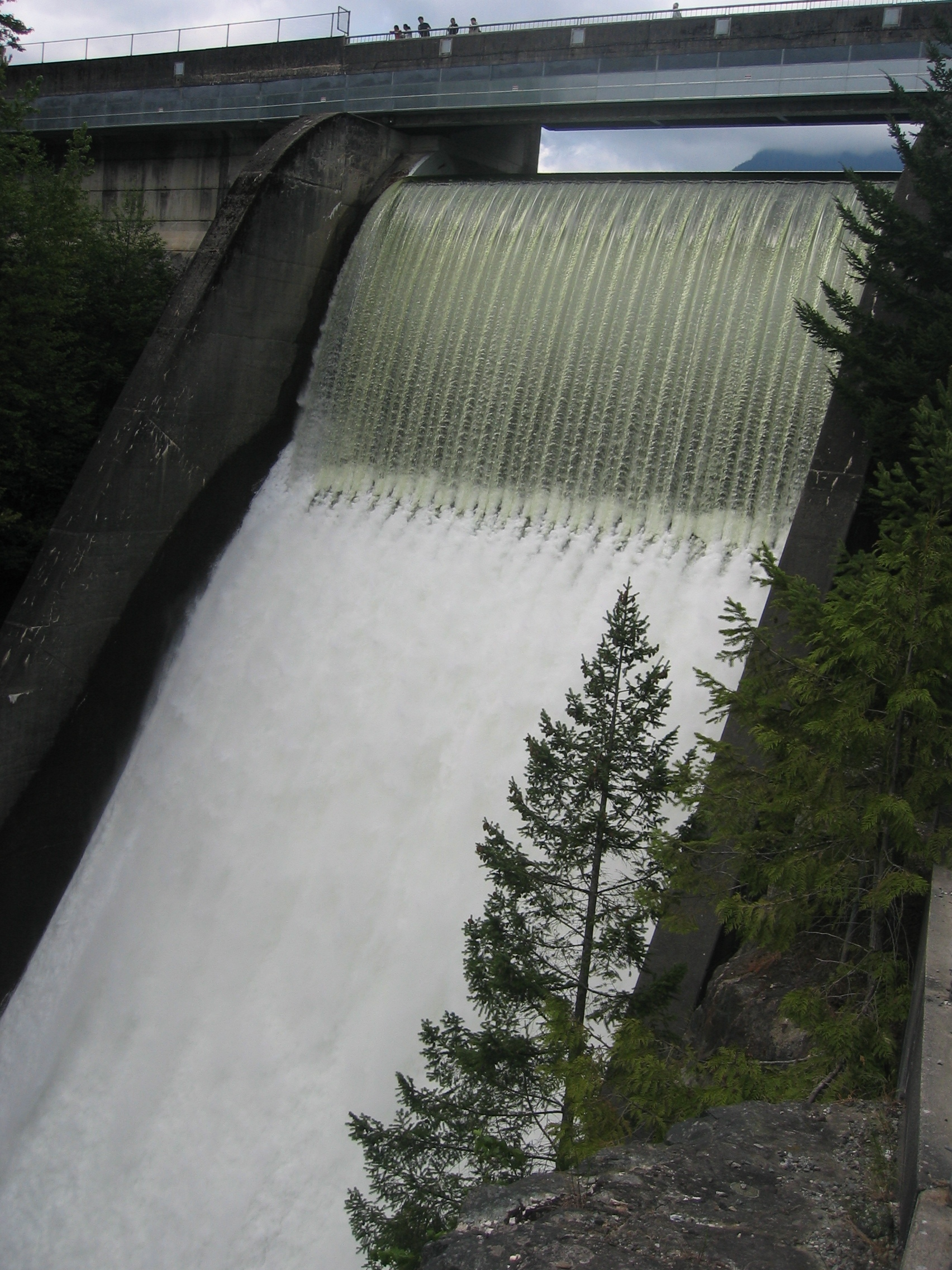
- Cleveland Dam spillway following significant rainfall
- Interactive map of Cleveland Dam
- Country: Canada
- Location: North Vancouver, British Columbia, Canada
- Coordinates: 49°21′37″N 123°06′39″W
- Purpose: water supply
- Construction began: 1951
- Opening date: 1954
- Operator: Metro Vancouver Regional District

Dam and spillways
- Impounds: Capilano River
- Height (foundation): 91 metres (299 ft)

The Cleveland Dam is a 91-metre-high (299 ft) concrete dam at the head of the Capilano River in Upper Capilano, North Vancouver, British Columbia, Canada that holds back Capilano Lake, also known as Capilano reservoir. Part of the Capilano River Regional Park, it stores a portion of the Lower Mainland's drinking water. It captures water from one of the three Metro Vancouver watersheds. Construction was started in 1951 and completed in 1954.

The dam is named after engineer Ernest Albert Cleveland who envisioned the need for the proper maintenance of a pristine and efficient water supply as well as sustainable use of water resources. He served as the first chief commissioner of the Greater Vancouver Water District from 1926 until his death in 1952.

== Accidents ==
The Cleveland Dam had several failures of the drum gate, causing water to be uncontrollably released into the Capilano River running through Capilano River Regional Park. Warning sirens were not installed until after the death of two men in 2020.

In 1975, a nine-year-old girl was killed by a surge of water released from the dam. The area had no warning signs or alarm at the time. Signs were later added to warn visitors of the potential hazards of the dam.

In 2001, four fishermen were trapped in the river when the water level surged without a warning after the spillway's drum gate inadvertently dropped open. WorkSafeBC issued several orders to reduce the risk to workers and the public, including but not limited to: "spillway gate lockout, access to the riverway by workers where lockout is not required, mancheck systems, emergency rescue and evacuation, public warning signage, and warning alarms". However, some of the orders were ignored and public-facing warning alarms were never installed.

On October 1, 2020, the dam's drum gate opened unexpectedly during maintenance, causing water to gush out onto Capilano River. The torrent of water killed one person with another person missing and presumed dead. Several park goers were trapped within Capilano River Regional Park. While many managed to escape by themselves, four people had to be rescued. The Capilano River's water level rapidly increased by 3.58 metres (11.7 ft), pushing 413 cubic metres (14,600 cu ft) of water per second at its recorded peak. These flow rates normally only occur in the rainy season. The anglers at the river edge had no warning except the sound of rushing water as the dam has no public alarm system to warn of a water surge. The popular recreation site had many people scrambling to get out of the way while others in safe areas witnessed their rush to escape. After this accident, warning sirens were installed at three locations along the river.

== In popular culture ==
The dam is prominently featured in the Smallville episode "Leech," where Clark Kent loses his powers via a lightning strike while attempting to save a classmate from jumping from the dam, as well as in the episode "Dichotic" in the second season. The dam is portrayed in two episodes of the 1996 TV series The Sentinel. It is also featured in the second-season episode of the series Supernatural, titled "Simon Said". A Cadillac goes over the dam into the Capilano River in the film The 6th Day. The dam is also a central location in the film Bad Girls from Valley High. The dam and reservoir were also used in Dawn of the Planet of the Apes. The Amazon TV series The Man in the High Castle features the dam in several scenes during the first season of the show as a meeting location near Canon City, within the neutral zone.

== Gallery ==
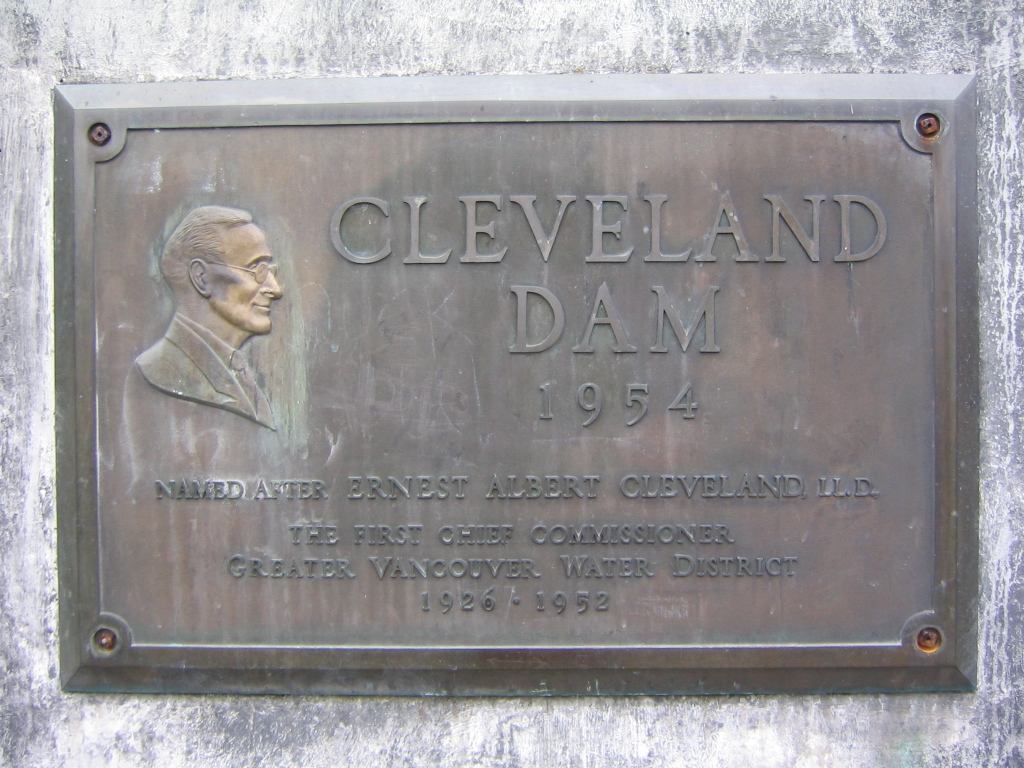
Commemorative plaque affixed to the Cleveland Dam along the walkway.

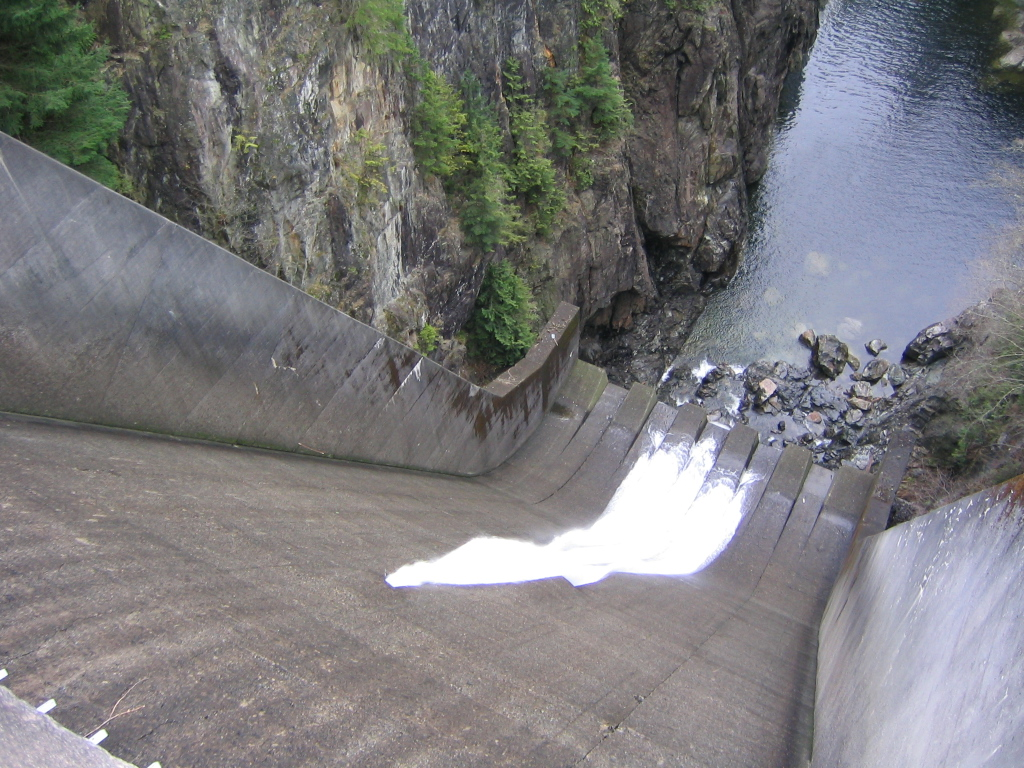
View of the spillway area from the Cleveland Dam walkway on a low water day.

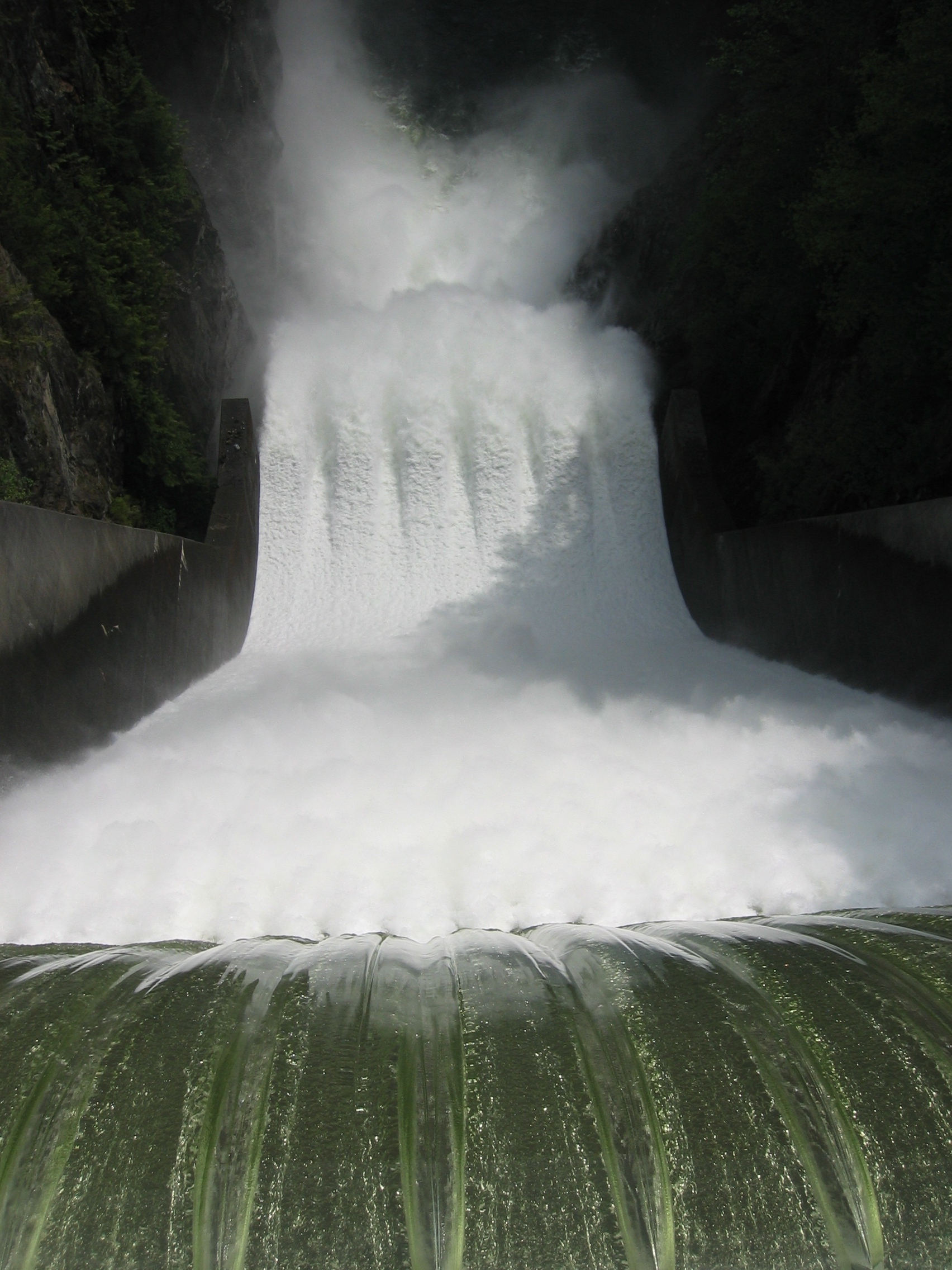
The spillway area from the Cleveland Dam on a high water day (resulting from snowmelt in the mountains).
