= Capilano River Regional Park =

Regional park in British Columbia, Canada

- Interactive map of Capilano River Regional Park
- Type: Regional Park
- Location: District of North Vancouver
- Nearest city: District of North Vancouver, British Columbia, Canada
- Coordinates: 49.353°N 123.114°W
- Operator: Metro Vancouver Regional District
- Website: metrovancouver.org/services/regional-parks/park/capilano-river-regional-park

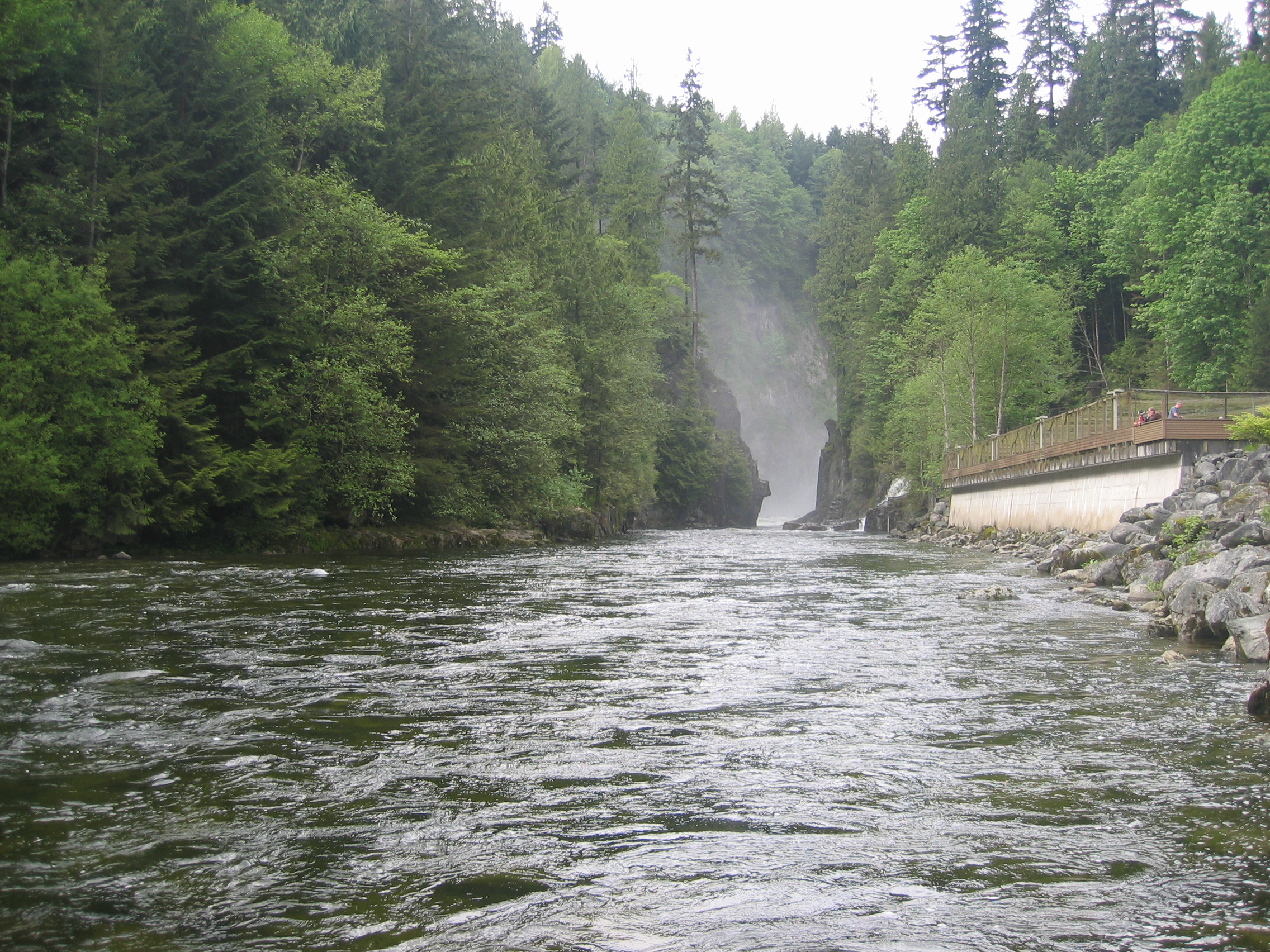
The Capilano River.

Capilano River Regional Park is located in the District of North Vancouver in British Columbia, Canada. It is one of twenty-three regional parks operated by the Metro Vancouver. The park encompasses most of the upstream areas of the Capilano River below the Cleveland Dam. The area north of the dam surrounding Capilano Lake is closed to the public as it is a GVRD watershed. The privately operated Capilano Suspension Bridge crosses the river, but it is not within park boundaries and does not access the park.

== Attractions ==
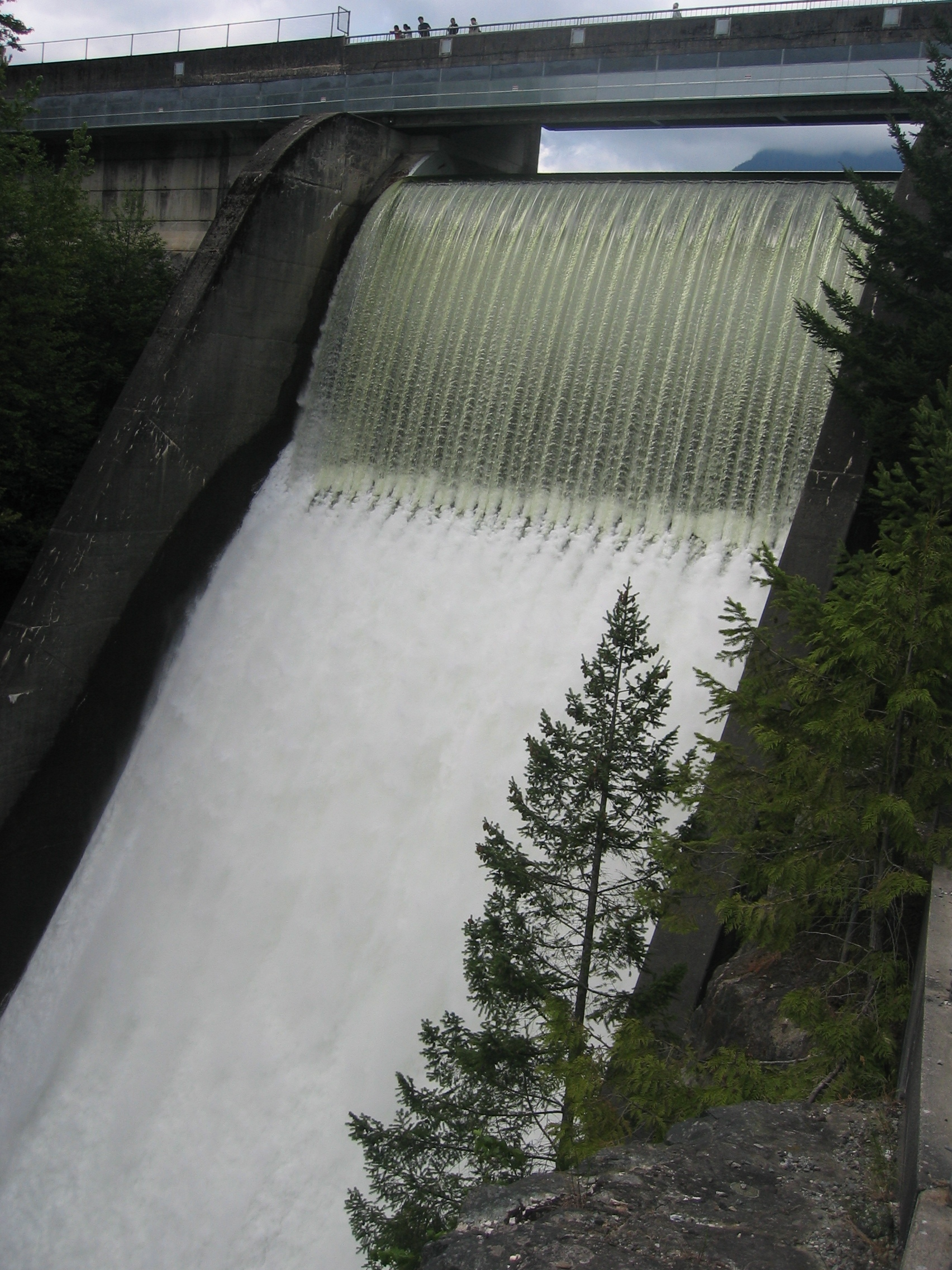
The Cleveland Dam.

Capilano River Regional Park is most commonly associated with the Cleveland Dam. Admission to the dam is free, and one can walk across the dam and observe the river and the spillway. Formed above the dam, Capilano Lake stores the river's waters, stretching north for more than five kilometres. The lake is one of three major watersheds in the GVRD, and it currently supplies forty percent of the region's drinking water. Water treatment facilities are located adjacent to the dam, and a tunneling project scheduled for completion in 2008 will connect the reservoir to a new treatment plant at the Seymour Dam to the east.

There is also the Capilano Fish Hatchery in the park, about 500 metres downhill from the Cleveland Dam. Admission is free. The hatchery receives 238,000 visitors annually and is widely recognized for its contribution of coho and steelhead to the sport fishery in Burrard Inlet. The hatchery offers educational displays explaining the type of work that is done there, as well as basic education about the life cycles of the fish in the area. There is also a cross-section display of an active fish ladder. During spawning seasons, the fish ladder is heavily used by fish in the area that use it to bypass the dam.

The rugged waters of the Capilano River within the park also attracts kayakers and canoers. There are also a number of nature and biking trails in the park, and it is frequently used as a location for film and television production most notably MacGyver, Smallville, Tin Man and Twilight: New Moon.

== Transportation ==
Street access is by way of Capilano Road in the District of North Vancouver. There are parking lots at the Cleveland Dam, near the top of Capilano Road, and at the fish hatchery along Capilano Park Road. TransLink bus routes 232 (from Phibbs Exchange) and 236 (from Lonsdale Quay) stop near park and trail entrances. Hikers can access the park from several different trails in West Vancouver and the District of North Vancouver.

== Gallery ==
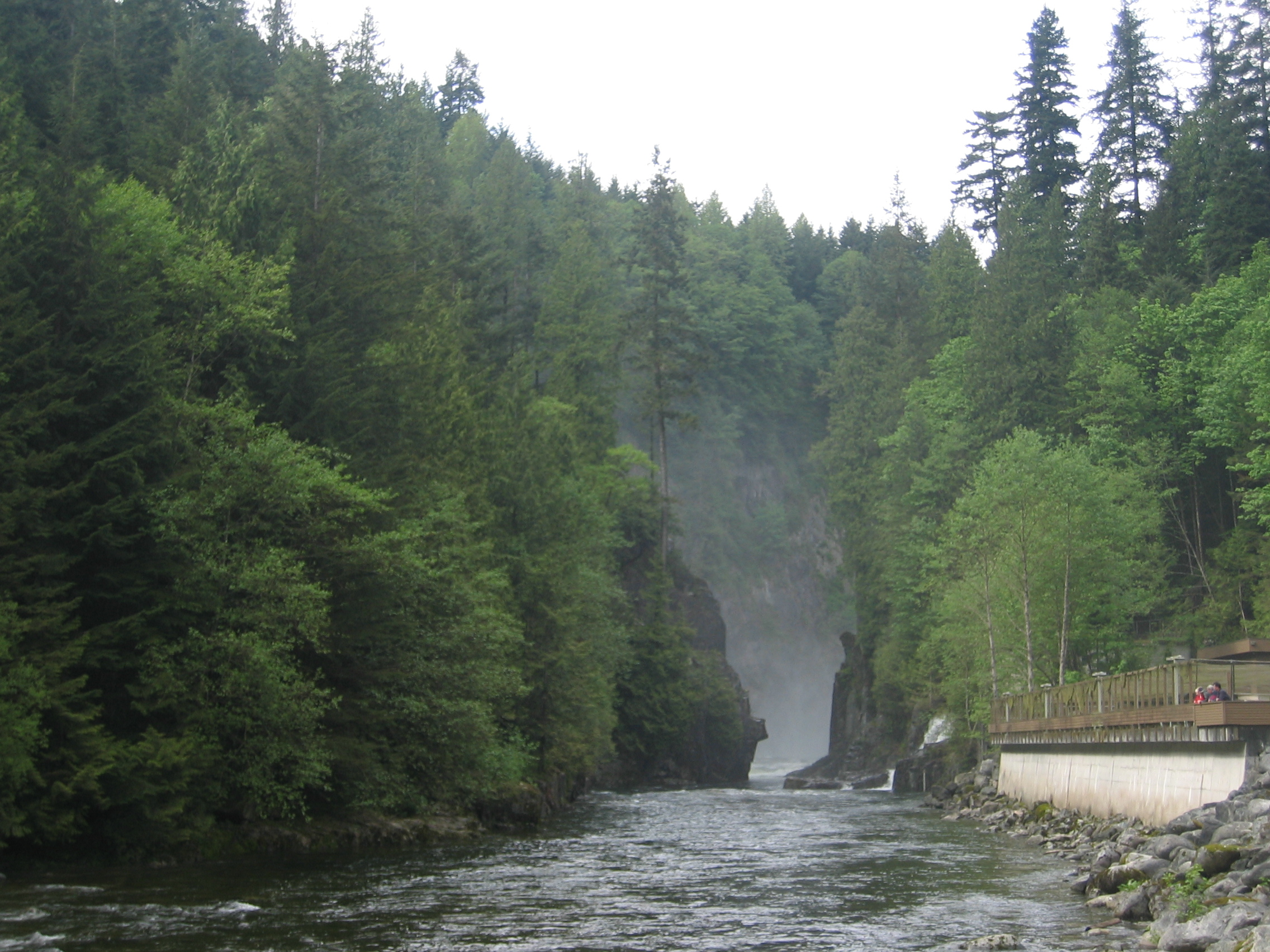
The Capilano River

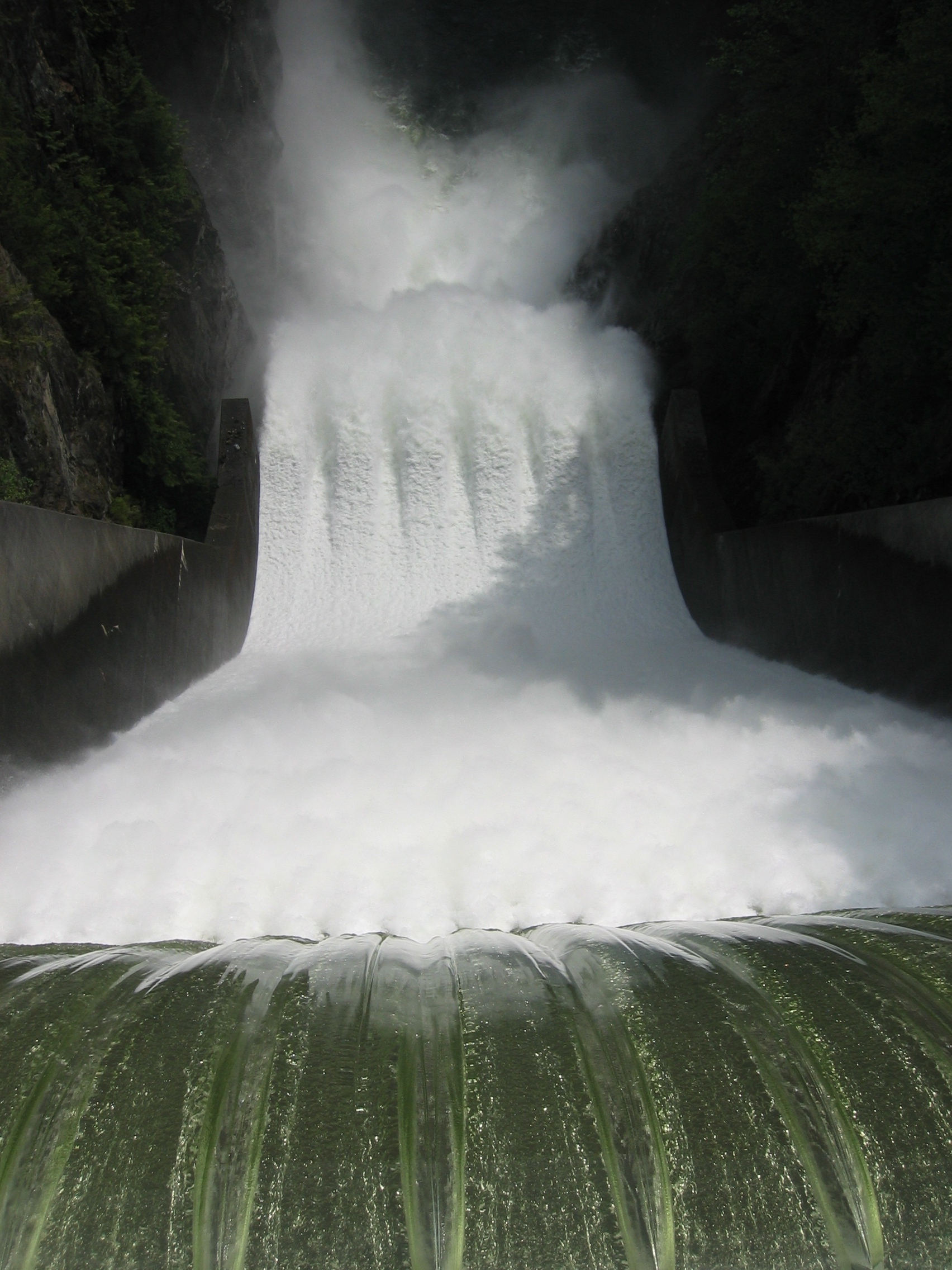
Looking downwards from the top of the Cleveland Dam

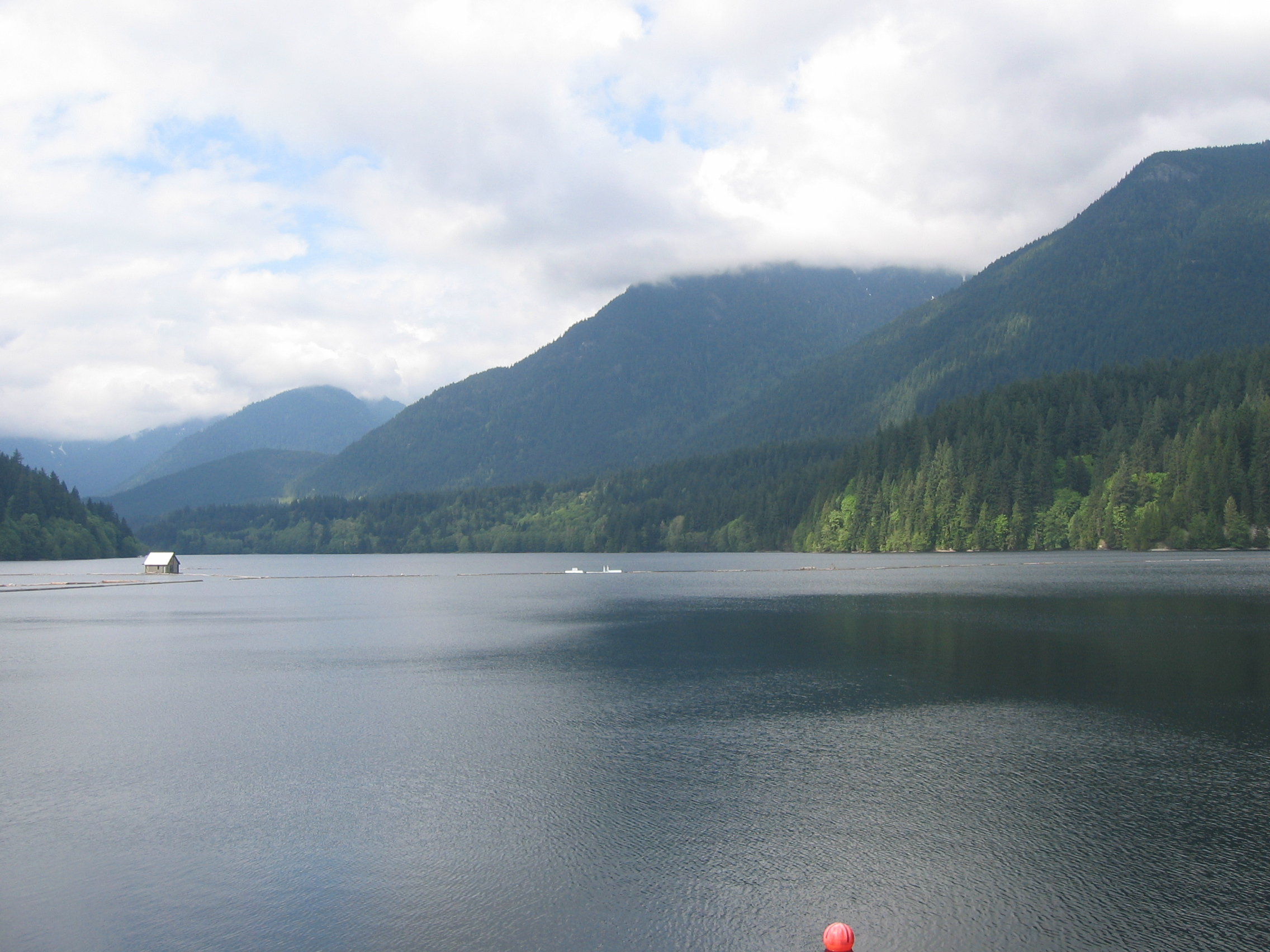
Capilano Lake, as seen from the top of the Cleveland Dam

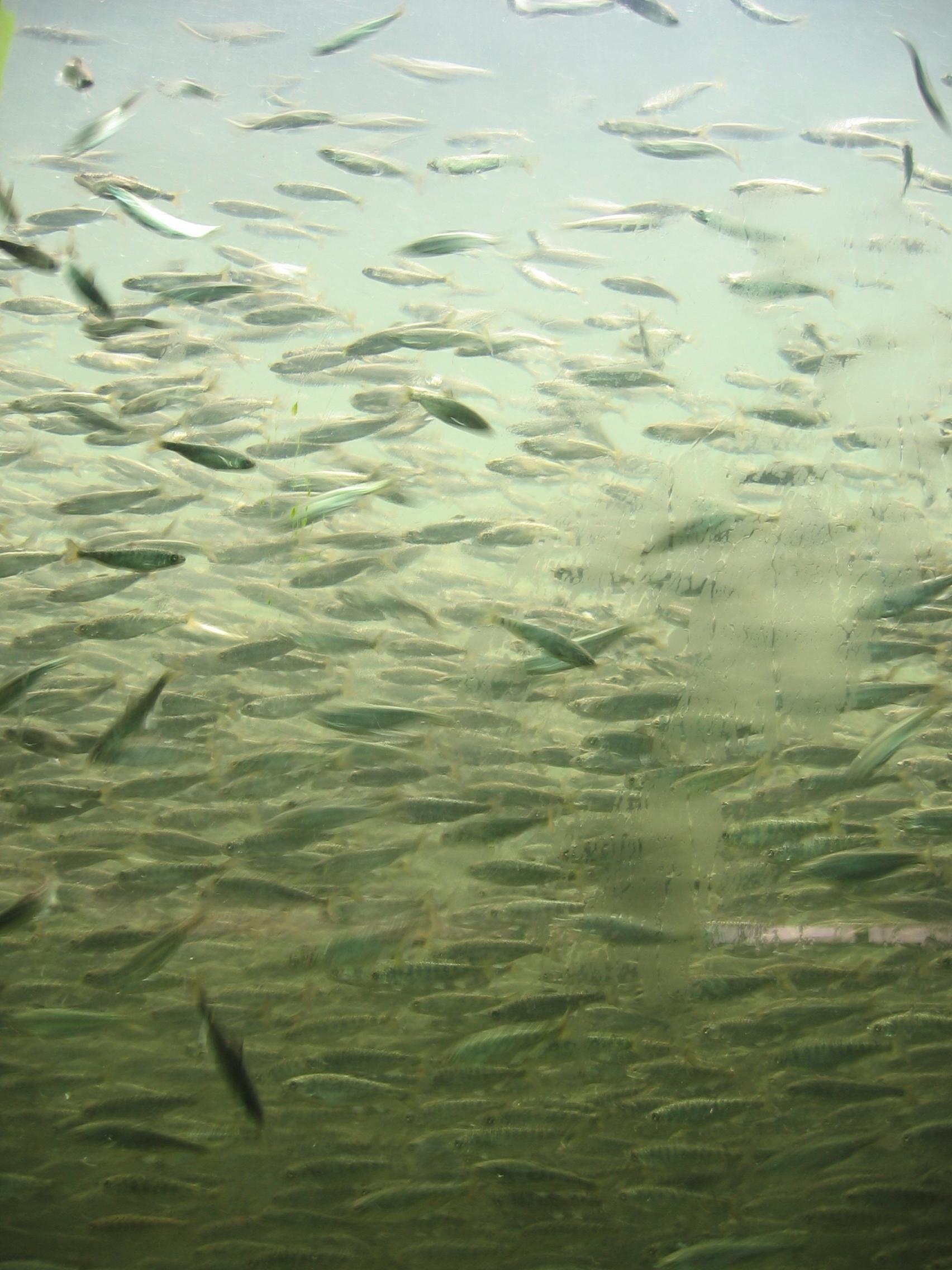
Fish from the park's hatchery

== See also ==
- Cleveland Dam
- Capilano River
- Capilano Suspension Bridge
