= Capilano Suspension Bridge =

Bridge in British Columbia, Canada

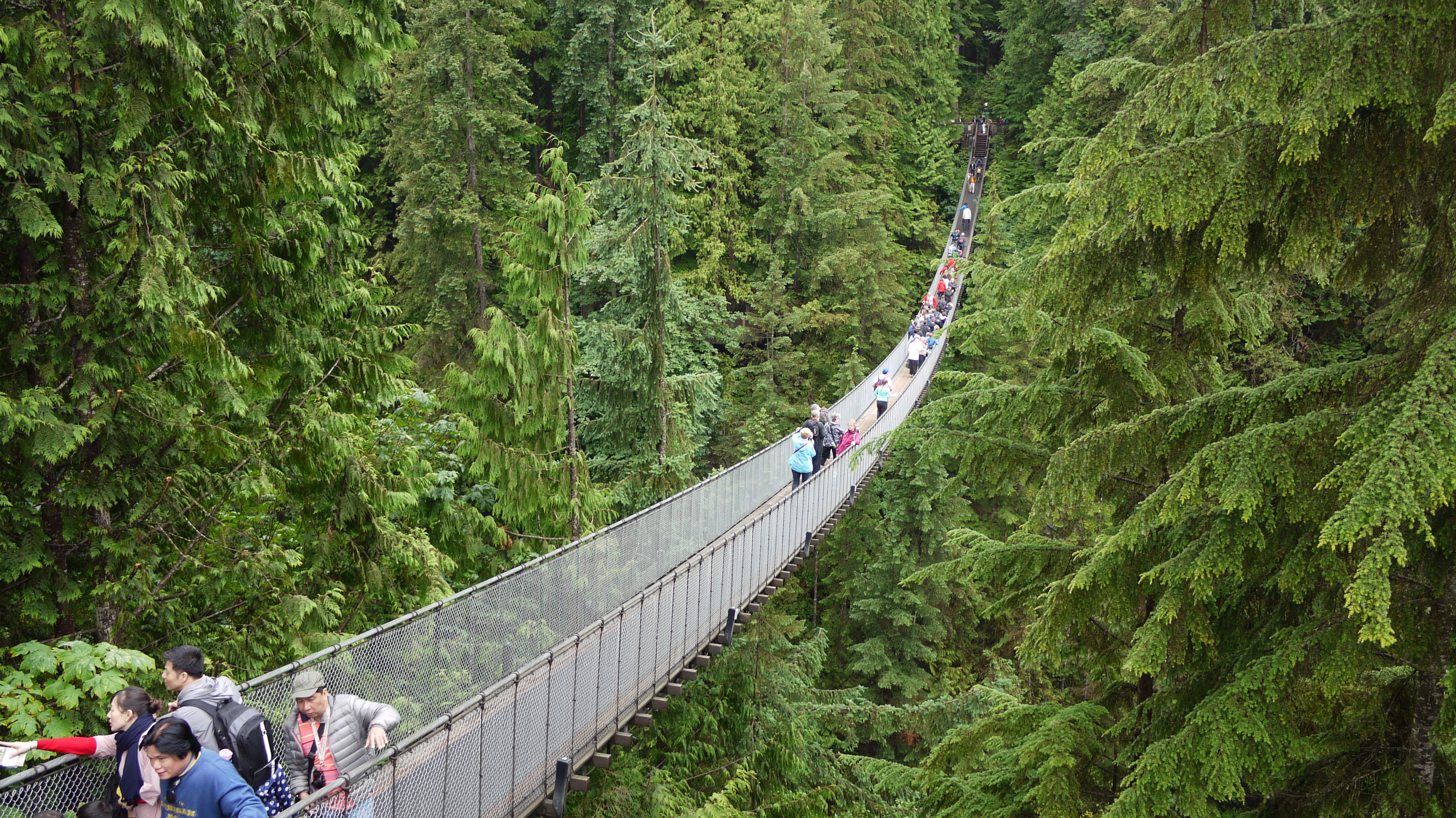
- Capilano Suspension Bridge in July 2016
- Coordinates: 49.342874°N 123.115129°W
- Carries: Pedestrians
- Crosses: Capilano River
- Locale: 3735 Capilano Road, North Vancouver, British Columbia V7R 4J1

Characteristics
- Design: Simple Suspension
- Total length: 140 metres (460 ft)
- Height: 70 metres (230 ft)

History
- Opened: 1889

Location
- Interactive map of Capilano Suspension Bridge

Capilano Suspension Bridge Park
- Interactive map of Capilano Suspension Bridge Park
- Status: Operating
- Owner: Capilano Group
- Operated by: Capilano Group
- Slogan: Naturally Thrilling
- Attendance: 1.2 million visitors annually
- Website: www.capbridge.com

The Capilano Suspension Bridge is a simple suspension bridge crossing the Capilano River in Upper Capilano, British Columbia, Canada, in the District of North Vancouver. The current bridge is 140 metres (460 ft) long and 70 metres (230 ft) above the river. It is part of a private facility with an admission fee and draws over 1.2 million visitors per year.

== History ==
The bridge was originally built in 1889 by George Grant Mackay, a Scottish civil engineer and park commissioner for Vancouver. It was originally made of hemp ropes with a deck of cedar planks and was replaced with a wire cable bridge in 1903. In 1910 Edward Mahon purchased the Capilano Suspension Bridge. "Mac" MacEachran purchased the Bridge from Mahon in 1935 and invited local natives to place their totem poles in the park, adding a native theme. In 1945, he sold the bridge to Henri Aubeneau.

The bridge was completely rebuilt in 1956.

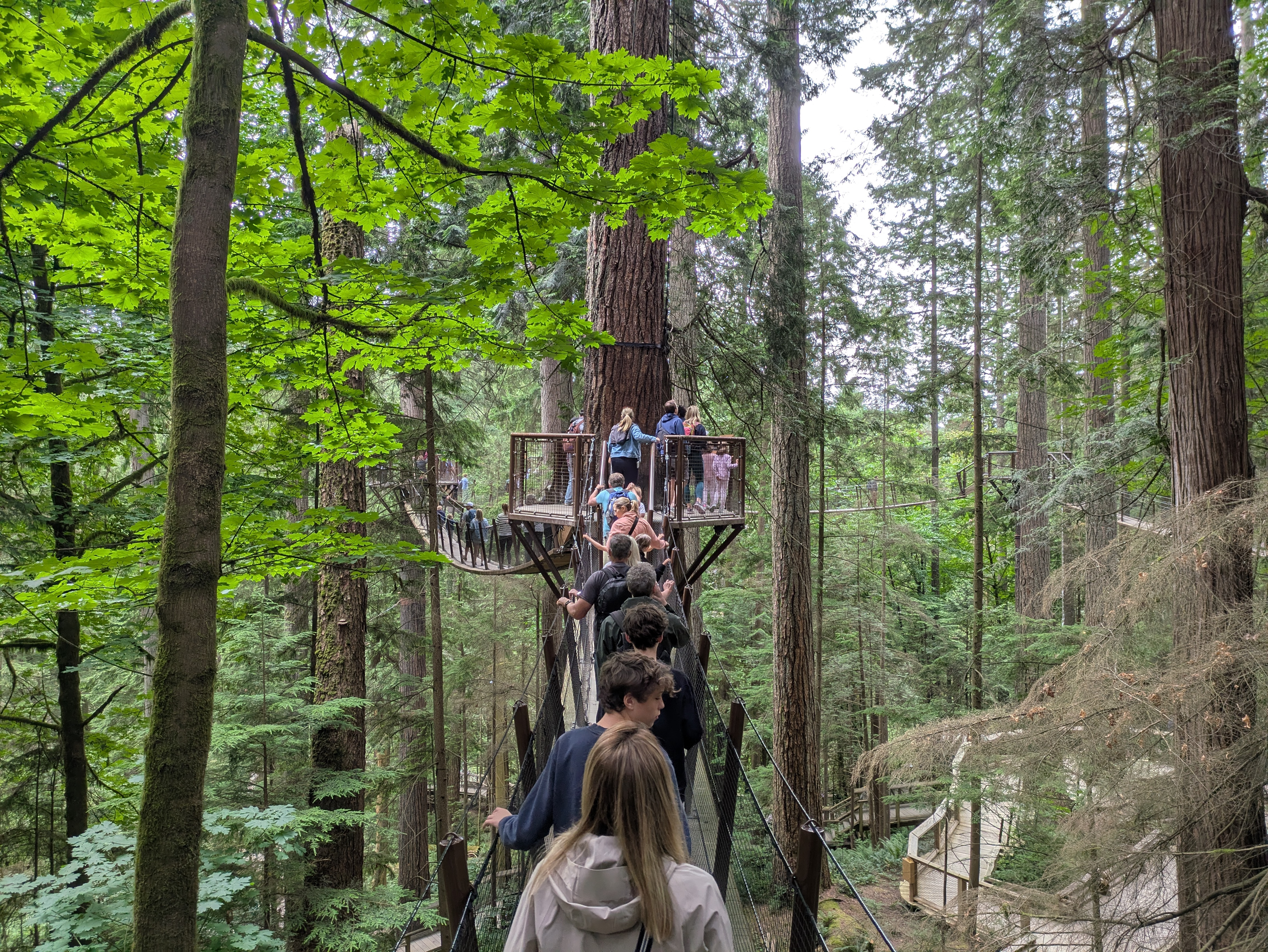
Treetops Adventure

The park was sold to Nancy Stibbard, the current owner, in 1983. Annual attendance increased, and in May 2004, Treetops Adventures was opened, consisting of seven footbridges suspended between old-growth Douglas fir trees on the west side of the canyon, forming a walkway up to 30 metres (98 ft) above the forest floor.

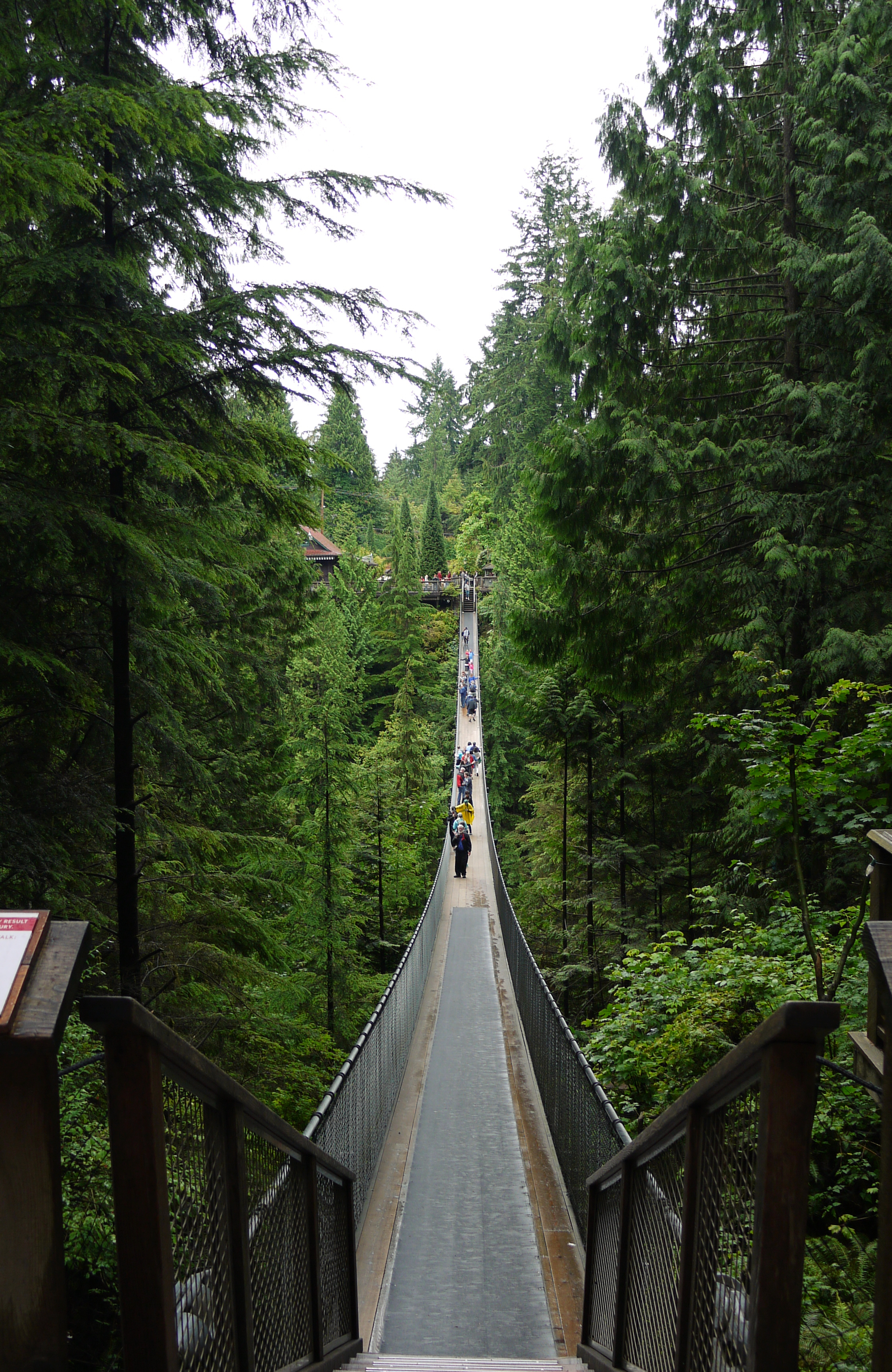
Capilano Suspension Bridge

In June 2011, a new attraction called Cliffwalk was added to the park.

== Incidents ==
In September 1999, a woman dropped her 18-month-old child with Down syndrome off the bridge. She claimed she stumbled accidentally and the child slipped from her grasp. The child was not seriously injured. The woman lost legal custody of her child to the child's father as a result of the incident. The woman took legal action against the owner of the bridge, her ex-husband and the Federal Department of Justice. The case against the owner of the bridge was settled in 2004.

In 2006, a 300-year-old, 46-tonne Douglas fir tree toppled during a heavy snowstorm, falling across the western end of the bridge. Park officials closed the bridge temporarily while repairs were performed.

On June 6, 2010, a teenage tourist on a class trip from California climbed over a railing and fell more than 30 metres (98 ft) from a fenced-off viewing platform near the bridge. By the time rescue workers came to his aid, the victim was dead. The official RCMP finding was that the teen was under the influence of LSD at the time of the incident.

On June 2, 2012, a 30-year-old tourist from Ontario died after falling near the bridge. Police say the victim was hiking through trails near the popular attraction when he climbed over a railing and fell to the riverbed below.

== Popular culture ==
The bridge has been featured as a setting in episodes of several television series, including MacGyver, Sliders, The Crow: Stairway to Heaven, The Mentalist, and Psych.

In 1974, social psychologists Donald Dutton and Arthur Aron conducted a well-known experiment on the bridge. Men approached by a female researcher on the bridge were more likely to call her later than men approached on a more solid bridge across the river. Dutton and Aron argued that this supported the theory that the men were mis-attributing the arousal caused by fear to sexual attraction toward the woman. This research supported Stanley Schachter's two-factor theory of emotion.

In June 2019, Korean Pop group NCT 127 created a video of their visit to the Capilano Suspension Bridge as part of the social media documenting their world tour NCT 127: The Origin.

The bridge has appeared in the racing games Mario Kart Tour and Mario Kart 8 Deluxe as a part of the first lap in the "Vancouver Velocity" race track.

== See also ==
- Capilano River
- Capilano River Regional Park
- Lynn Canyon Suspension Bridge
- List of notable pedestrian bridges
- List of bridges in Canada
