= Capilano River =

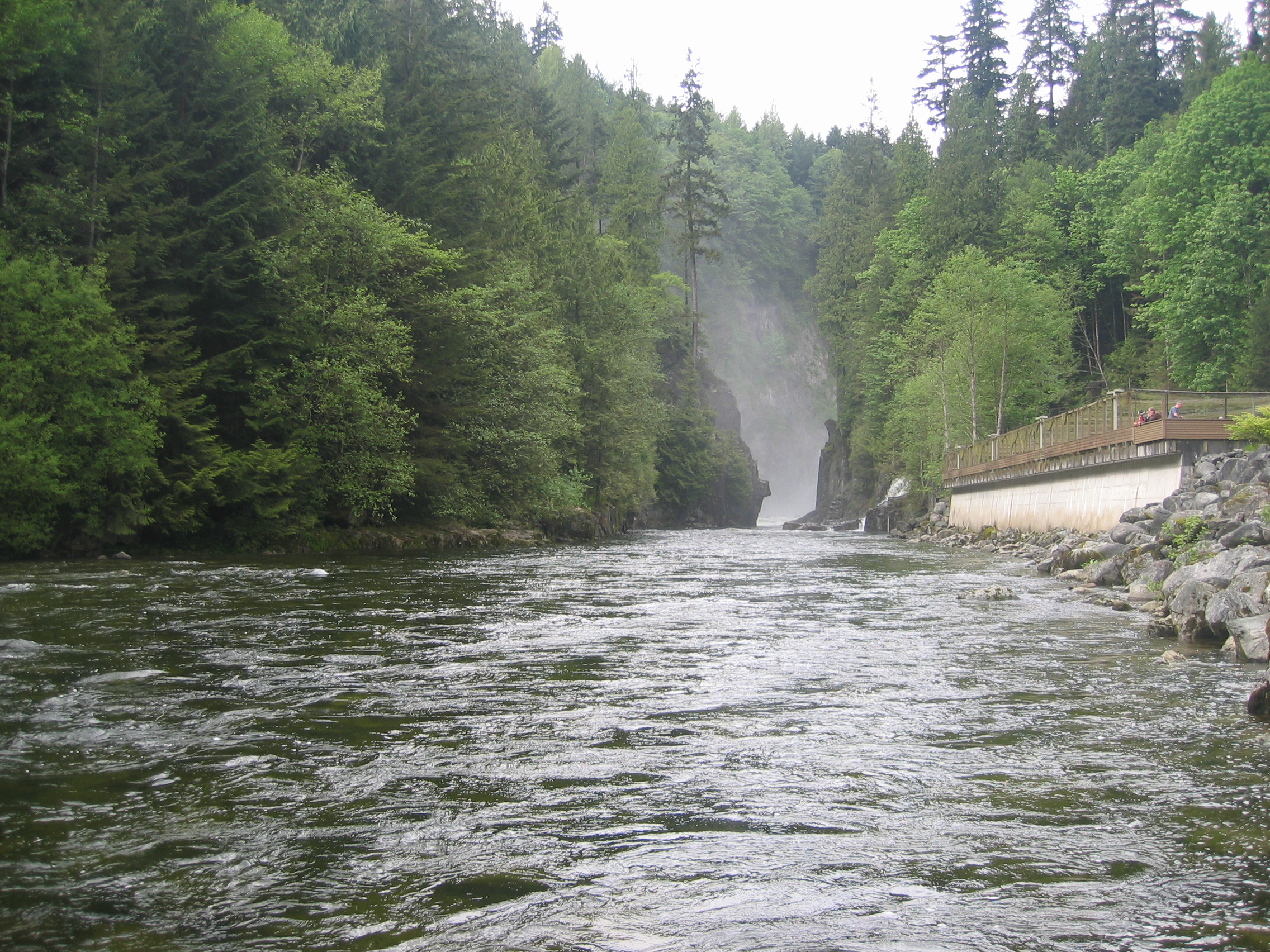
- Capilano River

- Mouth of Capilano River

Location
- Country: Canada
- Province: British Columbia
- District: New Westminster Land District

Physical characteristics
- Source: Capilano Mountain
  - location: North Shore Mountains
- Mouth: Burrard Inlet
  - location: Lower Mainland
  - coordinates: 49°19′16″N 123°8′22″W
  - elevation: 0 m (0 ft)

The Capilano River flows from north to south through the Coast Mountains on the North Shore of the Burrard Inlet between British Columbia's district municipalities of West Vancouver and North Vancouver and empties into Burrard Inlet, opposite Stanley Park. The river is one of three primary sources of drinking water for residents of Greater Vancouver, and flows through the Capilano watershed. The Cleveland Dam, built in 1954, impounds a reservoir for this purpose. The entire area of the reservoir and watershed area upstream of the dam is closed to the public to ensure the quality of the drinking water. Prior to construction of the Cleveland Dam, the Capilano River deposited large amounts of sediment into Burrard Inlet. A dredge was needed to remove this sediment build-up in order to keep Burrard Inlet open for ship traffic.

The Capilano River forms the rough boundary between North Vancouver and West Vancouver.

The Capilano has a historic salmon run which was impacted by the dam construction. In 1971 the Capilano Fish hatchery was opened. It was built 1/2 kilometre (km) downstream of the dam to ensure the survival of the run. Beyond strengthening the salmon stocks from the aftermath of the dam, the hatchery’s work also introduced chinook to the system in an attempt to establish a self-sustaining run.

The river flows through coastal rainforest and, in its lower stretches, follows a granite canyon with walls in excess of 40 metres tall in places.

The Capilano flows during periods of snow melt and rainfall mainly and slows to a trickle at other times.

The origin of the name Capilano River is obscure. The name is thought to be an anglicized form of names that were Squamish and Musqueam. The last man known as Chief Capilano died in 1870.

== Route ==
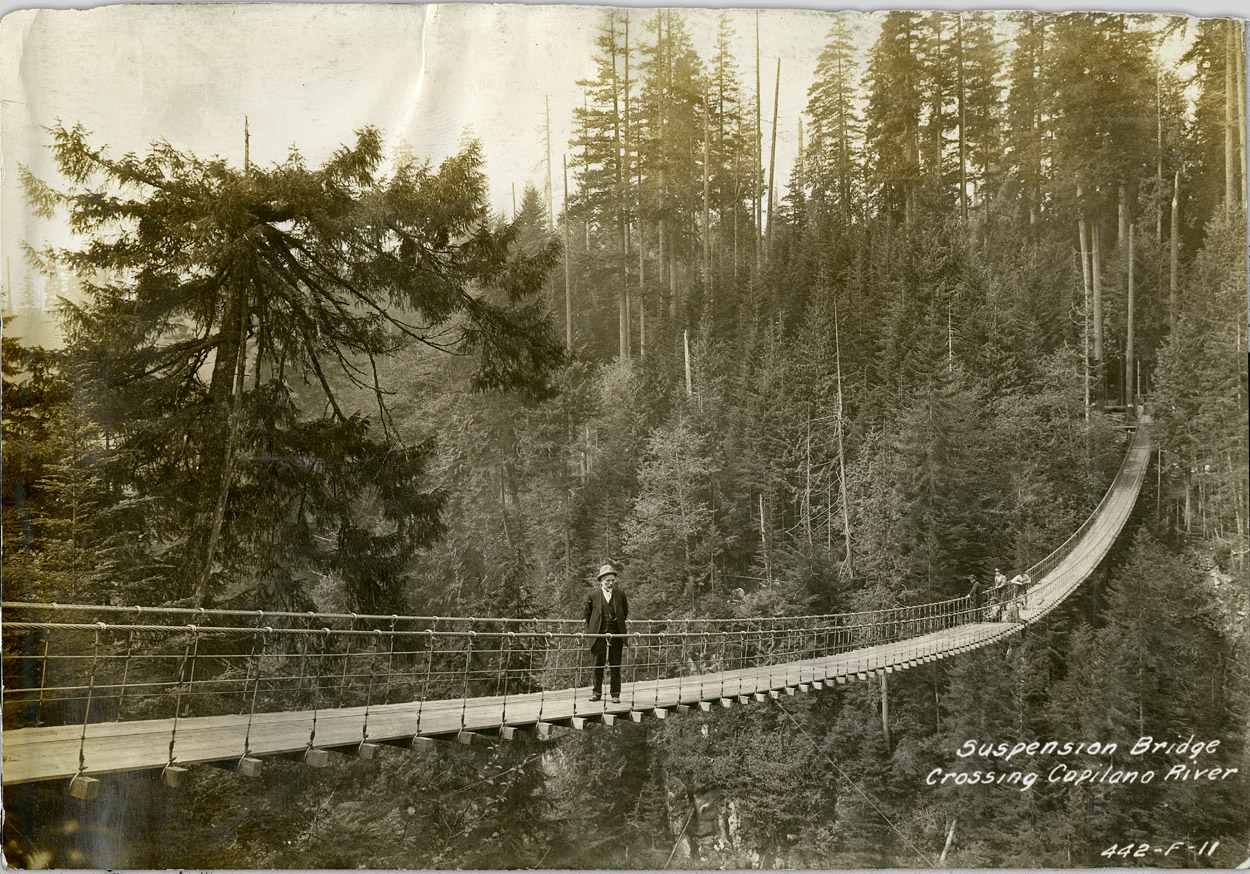
Suspension bridge crossing Capilano River

Capilano River's headwaters are at the top of Capilano Mountain, near Furry Creek. The river then continues down in a valley where many tributaries flow into the river like Eastcap Creek. The river then bends towards its tributary Sister's Creek which has its source at The Lions. Shortly past that confluence, the Capilano River flows into Capilano Lake, created by Cleveland Dam. When the river flows out of the dam it enters Capilano Canyon which it stays for about 4 km. After that it enters into its lowland and enters its mouth at Burrard Inlet, near Ambleside Park.

Most of the Capilano River below the Cleveland Dam is in the District of North Vancouver. However, south of the Marine Drive Bridge, the river is within the Capilano IR 5.

== Recreation ==
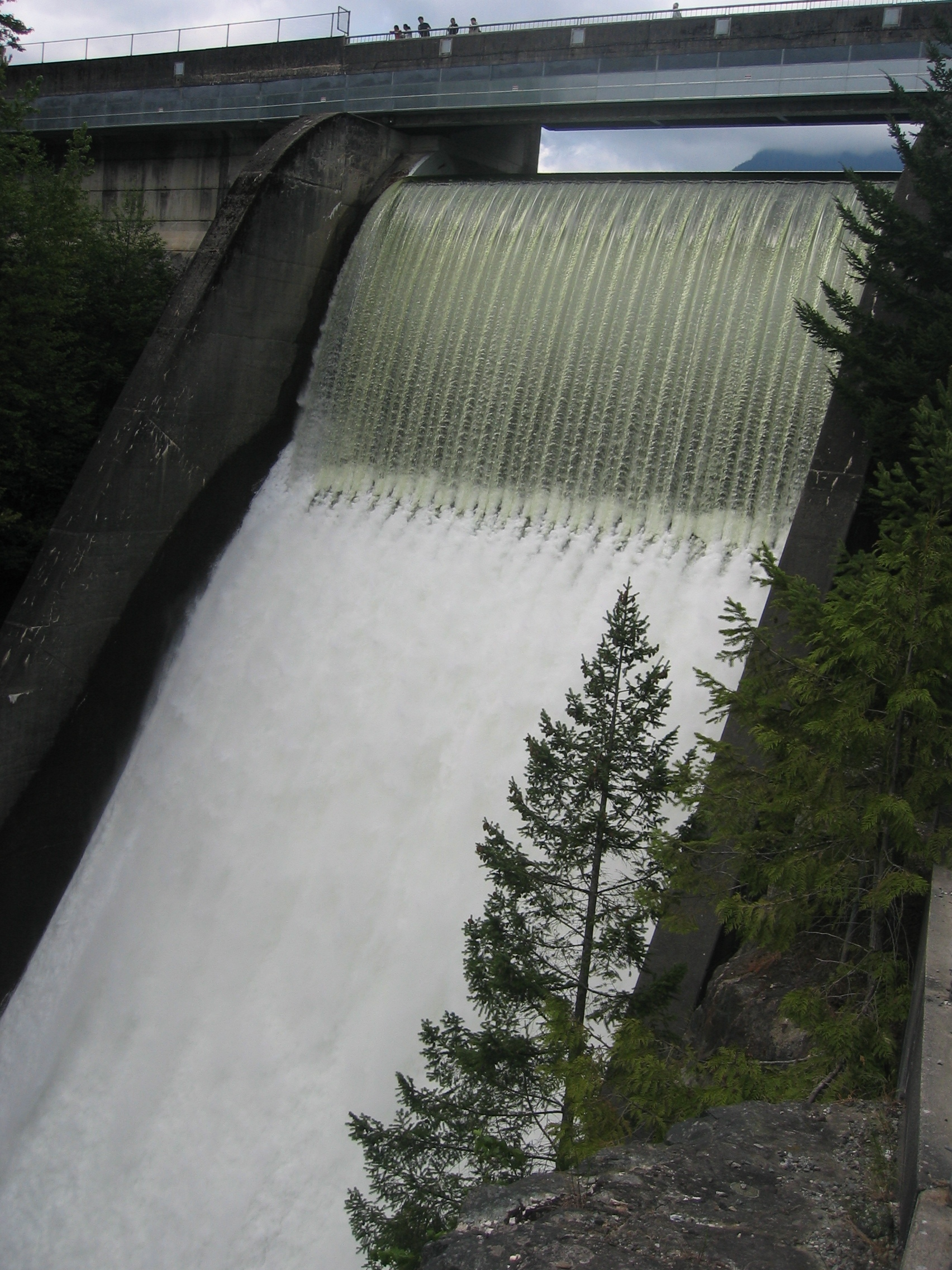
Cleveland Dam, which separates the river from Capilano Lake

When the river is running, whitewater kayakers in boats and apparel can often be seen. The river is rated as class III though at high water it can be much more challenging.

The Capilano River Regional Park, which surrounds the river and incorporates the fish hatchery, provides several kilometres of easy to moderate hiking trails alongside the river.

Every year in March the Capilano River is host to an annual charity duck race. Thousands of yellow rubber ducks are purchased ahead of time by the public. They float down the river in a sea of yellow. The first ducks to reach the mouth of the river win prizes for their owners.

== Accidents ==
There have been occasional accidents involving the surge of water released from Cleveland Dam. The operator of Cleveland Dam and Capilano River Regional Park, Metro Vancouver, has a public alarm system to warn visitors of a rapid water release from the dam. The alarm system was added in 2021 after two people died as a result of an unexpected increase of water flow.

== See also ==
- List of rivers of British Columbia
- Capilano River Regional Park
