= Capilano Lake =

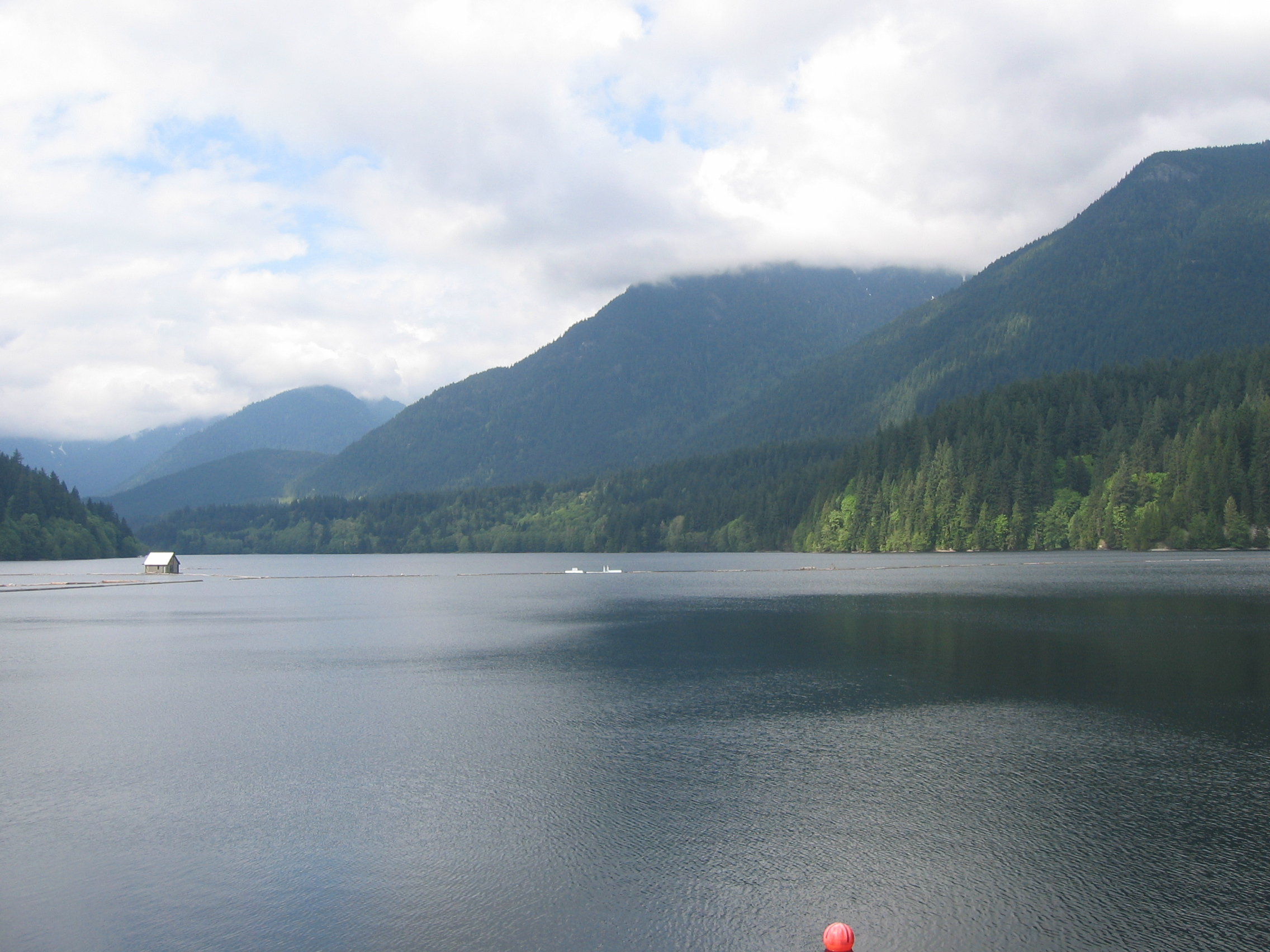

- Location within Greater Vancouver Regional District
- Location: British Columbia
- Coordinates: 49.377°N 123.120°W
- Type: Reservoir
- Primary inflows: Capilano River
- Primary outflows: Capilano River
- Basin countries: Canada
- Max. length: 4.8 km (3.0 mi)
- Max. width: 750 m (2,460 ft)
- Average depth: 87 m (285 ft)
- Water volume: 57.9×10^{9} L (12.7×10^{9} imp gal) 57.9×10^{9} L (15.3×10^{9} US gal)
- Surface elevation: 160 m (520 ft)
- Settlements: North Vancouver

Capilano Lake is a manmade lake located in the District of North Vancouver and West Vancouver in British Columbia, Canada.

== History ==
The lake accounts for approximately 40% of Greater Vancouver's water supply. The southern part of the lake is within the Capilano River Regional Park; it is also in this area that the lake is separated from the Capilano River's southern portion by the Cleveland Dam.

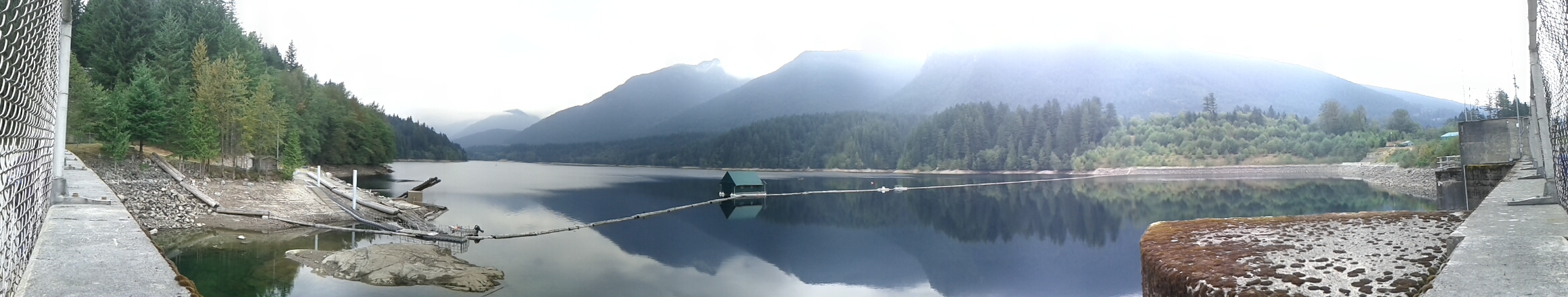
A view of Capilano Lake from the Cleveland Dam.

== In popular culture ==
Capilano Lake is portrayed as the fictional Highland Beach, Washington in The 4400 television program, as well as Lake Okobogee in a season one episode of the X-Files, as well as a location in the Quagmire episode from Season 3, Episode 22..

== See also ==
- List of lakes of British Columbia
- Capilano River
- Capilano River Regional Park
- Cleveland Dam
