= Sea to Sky Trail =

Multi-use recreational trail in BC, Canada

- Length: 180 km (110 mi)
- Established: 2005
- Completed: In progress
- Trailheads: Multiple access points Squamish waterfront (south); 49.68353°N 123.16364°W D'Arcy (north); 50.55°N 122.483333°W
- Use: Hiking, running, cycling
- Maintainer: Squamish-Lillooet Regional District

The Sea to Sky Trail is a 180-kilometre (110 mi) multi-use recreational trail in the Sea-to-Sky Corridor of British Columbia, Canada. The trail begins in the south on the Howe Sound in Squamish and terminates in D'Arcy on Anderson Lake in the north, connecting the communities of Whistler and Pemberton along its route. The trail between Squamish to Pemberton was designated as a section of the Trans Canada Trail, connected to the rest of the trail system via the Sea to Sky Marine Trail.

Currently, much of the trail is still in development. It features a combination of new and existing trails in the region. There are rugged wilderness sections like the Cheakamus Canyon Trail and the Shadow Lake Trail, packed gravel sections like the Ray Peters Trail as well as sections of urban multi-use paths such as the Corridor Trail in Squamish and the Valley Trail in Whistler. At this time, the trail involves significant sections of temporary alignment along roads, including on the Sea to Sky Highway. As of December 2020, there were 126 kilometres of non-motorized trail on the corridor.

== History ==
Before the Sea to Sky Trail existed in its current form, the Squamish people used trails in the Sea to Sky corridor for thousands of years. Prior to 1850s, when The Barrier lava dam partially collapsed, this was the main trading link with interior First Nations. The Pacific Great Eastern Railway was built in the 1910s and the Sea to Sky Highway in the 1950s, both of which used some of the old trail route.

The Sea to Sky Trail Society was formed in 1991 as a volunteer organization to plan and build a trail to connect communities in the Sea to Sky region. The idea gained support from Whistler Resort Municipality and in 2005, a Standing Committee within the Squamish-Lillooet Regional District was formed to develop a master plan and develop the trail. In the future, once the trail is complete, this committee intends to expand the scope of the project south to Horseshoe Bay and north to Lillooet.

In 2023, the trail received $700,000 in provincial grant funding and $1.37 million in private donations to fund improvements to the trail. Additional funding sources have been allocated toward extending the trail from Pemberton to the community of Mount Curie.

== Route ==
Note that the trail is incomplete at this time. The route and kilometre markers are approximate based on the current status of the trail from south to north, and will change as the trail nears completion.

KM	
0	Squamish Waterfront
3	Corridor Trail
10	Through the Looking Glass Trail
11	Ray Peters Trail
13	Squamish Valley Road
15	Paradise Valley Road
25	Cheakamus Canyon Trail
30	Hwy 99 (Temporary Alignment to Chance Creek FSR)
35	Shadow Lake Trail
41	Hwy 99 (Temporary Alignment to Brandywine Falls)
46	Brandywine Falls
48	Bungee Bridge
51	Cal-Cheak Recreation Site
68	Whistler Village
70	Lost Lake (End of Maintained Trail)
93	Hwy 99 (Temporary Alignment to Nairn Falls Provincial Park)
100	Nairn Falls Provincial Park
104	Pemberton
112	Mount Curie
180	D'Arcy

== See also ==
- Howe Sound Crest Trail
- Sunshine Coast Trail
- Vancouver Island Trail
