= Cypress Provincial Park =

Provincial park in Greater Vancouver, British Columbia, Canada

- IUCN category II (national park)
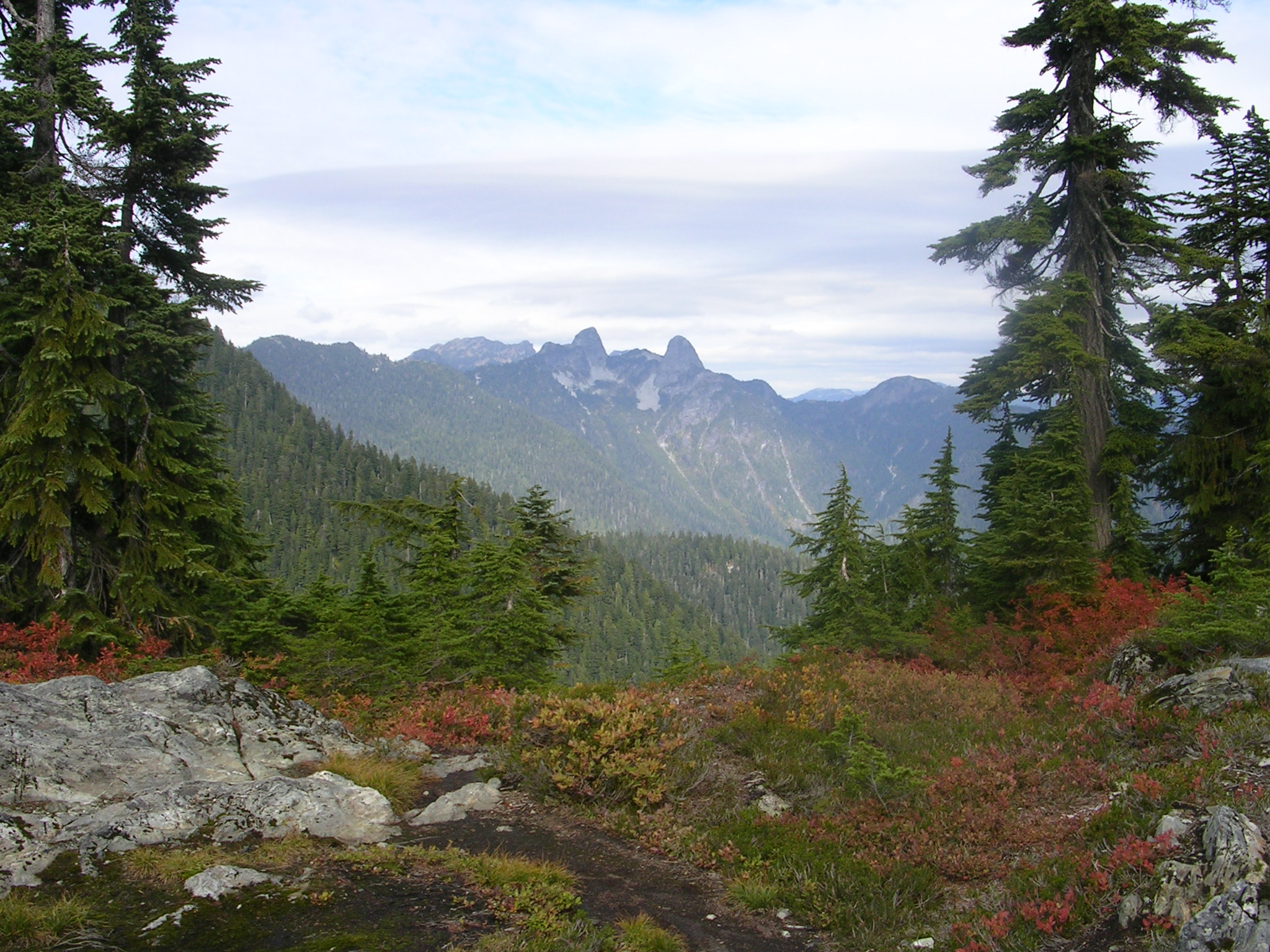
- The Lions seen from the Hollyburn Mountain Trail

- Location within British Columbia Location within Greater Vancouver Regional District
- Interactive map of Cypress Provincial Park
- Location: Metro Vancouver, British Columbia, Canada
- Nearest city: West Vancouver
- Coordinates: 49°23′30″N 123°12′45″W
- Area: 30.12 km^{2} (11.63 sq mi)
- Established: 1975 (provincial park); 1982 (Howe Sound added)
- Visitors: 1.832 million (in 2017-18)
- Governing body: BC Parks
- Website: Cypress Provincial Park

Cypress Provincial Park is a provincial park on the North Shore of Metro Vancouver Regional District, British Columbia. The park has two sections: a 21 km^{2} (8.1 sq mi) southern section which is accessible by road from West Vancouver, and a 9 km^{2} (3.5 sq mi) northern section which is only accessible by hiking trails. The two sections are linked by a narrow strip of park along the mountainous Howe Sound Crest Trail.

The southern section of Cypress Provincial Park contains a ski area (Cypress Mountain Ski Area) that is operated under a Park Use Permit by a private company called Cypress Bowl Recreations Ltd, owned by Boyne Canada, a subsidiary of US-based Boyne Resorts.

== Etymology ==
The name Cypress refers to the tree Cupressus nootkatensis, also known as yellow cedar or yellow cypress, which is common in the park at altitudes over 800 metres. Cypress Bowl is the name of the bowl between the three mountains that make up the Cypress Mountain Ski Area (Mount Strachan, Black Mountain, and Hollyburn Mountain).

== History ==
Evidence of Squamish and Tsleil-Waututh First Nations use has been documented in the park, including 350-400 year old bark-stripping scars on old-growth yellow cedar trees above Yew Lake.

Logging first began in 1870 to clear cut dense forests on Mount Vaughan, later renamed to Hollyburn Mountain in 1912. In 1918, James Nasmyth started a logging operation and built a mill on Rodgers Creek which operated until 1923. In the 1920s, Hollyburn Mountain became a popular recreation area for hikers and skiers utilizing the old logging roads. In 1926, the Hollyburn Lodge was built on First Lake, becoming the first commercial ski camp on the North Shore when it opened as the Hollyburn Ski Camp on January 16, 1927. In 1933, the West Lake Ski Camp also opened. By the late 1930s, Heaps Timber Company acquired timber leases in the Hollyburn and Cypress Bowl area. Public controversy forced the provincial government to set aside Cypress Bowl as a park reserve in 1944, after 40 hectares had already been logged. On January 17, 1951, the Hollyburn Aerial Tram (HAT) chairlift and HAT Inn opened near Hi-View Lookout. With rising popularity of skiing, nearly 300 cabins were built on Hollyburn Ridge by the 1960s.

Clear-cut logging resumed in 1966, affecting portions of Black Mountain and Strachan Mountain. The controversy about logging in the park, under the oversight of the Social Credit government, was debated in the BC Legislature and reported on in the media.Public outrage caused the province to take over development of winter recreation, resulting in the creation of Alpine and Nordic skiing facilities in 1970 and the construction of Cypress Bowl Road in 1973. Cypress Provincial Park was granted Class A Provincial Park status in 1975. The park was expanded north in 1982 to its current boundaries. The expansion included a narrow ridge running from Cypress Bowl to Brunswick Mountain, along what is now the Howe Sound Crest Trail, and a valley of subalpine mountain lakes (Brunswick Lake, Hanover Lake, and Deeks Lake). The Howe Sound Crest Trail linking the two park sections was completed by the late 1980s.

In 1984, the ski resorts, formerly operated by BC Parks, were privatized and now operate under a Park Use Permit. Beginning in 1986, the ski resort operator began attempts to block public access to winter activities in the provincial park without a day pass, resulting in protests. Hiker access trails were later developed to ensure public access to park areas outside of the resort area. The resort has unsuccessfully petitioned to expanded their Park Use Permit area numerous times but in 2002, 40 hectares of second growth forest on Black Mountain were added to the permit area, while a similar area of mostly old-growth forest and subalpine meadow on Hollyburn and Strachan was removed from the permit area. Cypress Creek Lodge opened in 2008. In 2010, Cypress helped host the 2010 Winter Olympics in Vancouver where it hosted Freestyle Skiing and Snowboarding competitions. The original Hollyburn Lodge, first constructed in 1926, completed renovations and reopened in 2018.

== Climate ==
Climate data for Hollyburn Ridge (Cypress Mountain) (Elevation: 930.00 m) 1971−2000
Month	Jan	Feb	Mar	Apr	May	Jun	Jul	Aug	Sep	Oct	Nov	Dec	Year
Record high °C (°F)	17.8 (64.0)	16.7 (62.1)	17.5 (63.5)	22.5 (72.5)	30.5 (86.9)	31.7 (89.1)	33.3 (91.9)	32.0 (89.6)	30.5 (86.9)	26.7 (80.1)	22.2 (72.0)	12.8 (55.0)	33.3 (91.9)
Mean daily maximum °C (°F)	1.1 (34.0)	2.5 (36.5)	3.9 (39.0)	6.6 (43.9)	10.5 (50.9)	13.3 (55.9)	17.5 (63.5)	17.7 (63.9)	15.3 (59.5)	9.2 (48.6)	2.6 (36.7)	0.6 (33.1)	8.4 (47.1)
Daily mean °C (°F)	−1.4 (29.5)	−0.4 (31.3)	0.8 (33.4)	3.0 (37.4)	6.3 (43.3)	9.0 (48.2)	12.6 (54.7)	13.0 (55.4)	10.6 (51.1)	5.8 (42.4)	0.3 (32.5)	−1.8 (28.8)	4.8 (40.6)
Mean daily minimum °C (°F)	−4.0 (24.8)	−3.2 (26.2)	−2.4 (27.7)	−0.6 (30.9)	2.0 (35.6)	4.7 (40.5)	7.6 (45.7)	8.2 (46.8)	5.9 (42.6)	2.3 (36.1)	−2.0 (28.4)	−4.1 (24.6)	1.2 (34.2)
Record low °C (°F)	−21.7 (−7.1)	−20.0 (−4.0)	−15.0 (5.0)	−8.3 (17.1)	−4.4 (24.1)	−2.2 (28.0)	0.0 (32.0)	0.6 (33.1)	−3.9 (25.0)	−14.0 (6.8)	−20.0 (−4.0)	−26.7 (−16.1)	−26.7 (−16.1)
Average precipitation mm (inches)	310.0 (12.20)	301.4 (11.87)	249.7 (9.83)	177.6 (6.99)	177.6 (6.99)	155.7 (6.13)	120.2 (4.73)	120.7 (4.75)	149.0 (5.87)	299.9 (11.81)	389.7 (15.34)	354.0 (13.94)	2,805.4 (110.45)
Average rainfall mm (inches)	173.1 (6.81)	164.6 (6.48)	139.7 (5.50)	107.1 (4.22)	167.9 (6.61)	155.4 (6.12)	120.2 (4.73)	120.7 (4.75)	148.4 (5.84)	285.6 (11.24)	284.1 (11.19)	213.2 (8.39)	2,080.4 (81.91)
Average snowfall cm (inches)	136.9 (53.9)	136.9 (53.9)	110.0 (43.3)	70.5 (27.8)	9.6 (3.8)	0.2 (0.1)	0.0 (0.0)	0.0 (0.0)	0.1 (0.0)	14.3 (5.6)	105.7 (41.6)	141.9 (55.9)	726.1 (285.9)
Average precipitation days (≥ 0.2 mm)	17.6	16.5	16.4	15.2	12.6	12.9	8.5	9.0	10.0	15.1	19.3	18.9	172.0
Average rainy days (≥ 0.2 mm)	8.8	8.2	8	9.7	11.8	12.8	8.5	9	9.9	14.1	12.7	9.0	122.5
Average snowy days (≥ 0.2 cm)	12.2	11.3	11.2	8.3	2.2	0.09	0.0	0.0	0.09	2.4	10.9	13.6	72.28
Source: Environment Canada (normals, 1981−2010)

== Winter season ==
During the winter, this is a ski area for both cross-country and alpine skiers. The ski operation has four quad (2 are high speed) and two double chairlifts, as well as a tube tow and a magic carpet for their ski school participants. With 53 downhill runs (beginner 23%, intermediate 37%, advanced 40%) and over 19 km (12 mi) of cross-country trails, Cypress Mountain is the largest ski area on Vancouver's North Shore. It also has the highest vertical rise, 613 m (2,011 ft), of the three North Shore ski resorts.

== Summer use ==
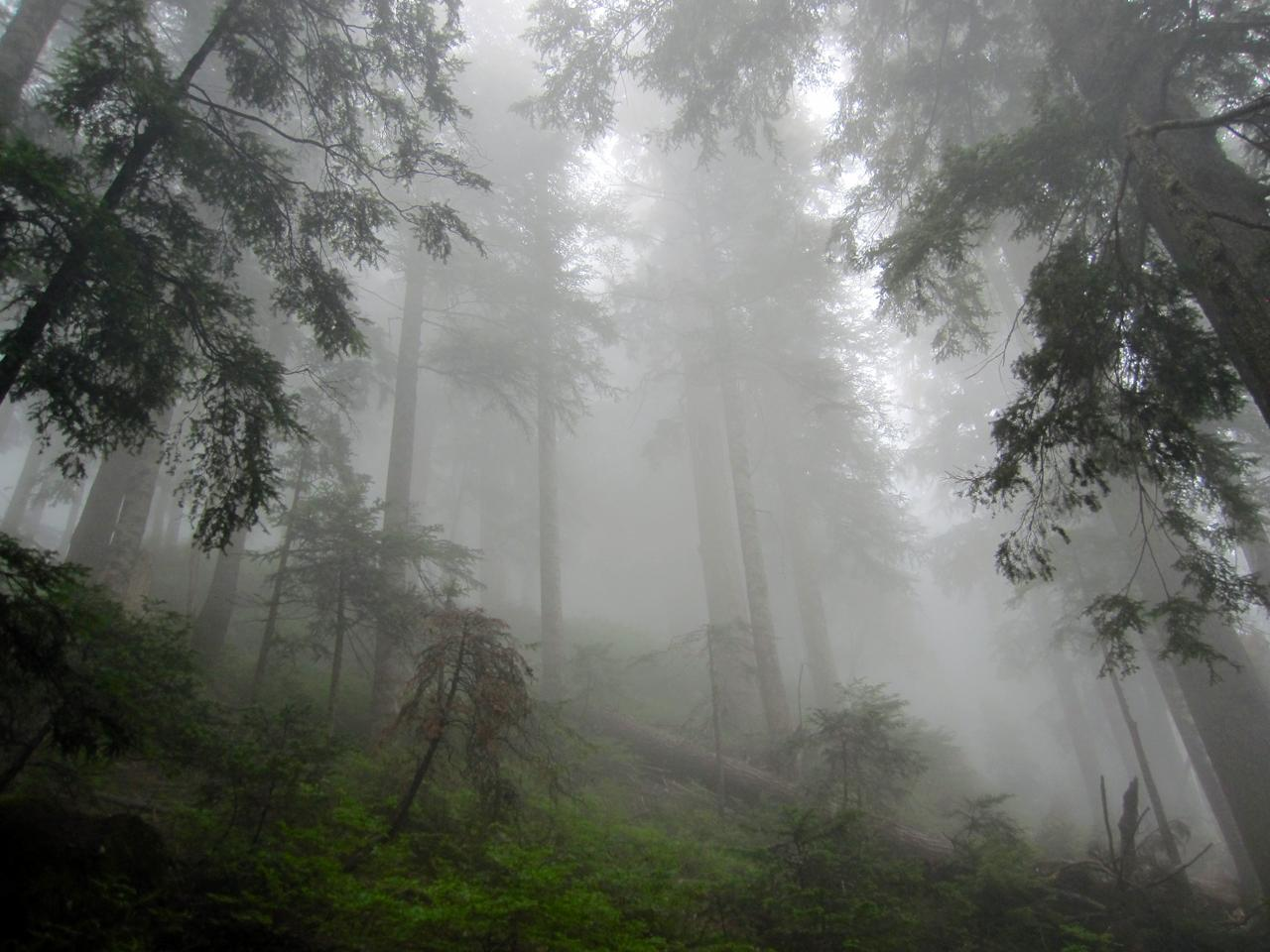
Afternoon mist in Cypress Provincial Park

In summer and fall, the park is usually free of snow and is popular with hikers. Its trail system includes sections of the Baden-Powell Trail in the southern section of the park, as well as the Howe Sound Crest Trail in the northern section. Parkbus offers a seasonal shuttle service to the park.

Beginning in the summer of 2005, Cypress Mountain Resort has created a lift-assisted mountain bike park, as set out in the 1997 Cypress Provincial Park Master Plan. Even though the lift accessed biking has now been closed for Olympic preparations and they have not yet bothered to restore the trails Cypress still hold many non-lift accessed bike trails. Most of these trails are situated lower down the mountain and are actually not a part of the park because of this they are under threat to development. These Trails on Cypress (Black Mountain Side) are known around the world for being some of the most technically challenging in the world, more challenging than the other two shore mountains (Seymour and Fromme). Trails on Cypress are known as being steep, eroded, and very dangerous. It has multiple rock faces that are close to vertical also having large jumps and drops. Most famous of these is the Brutus Gap, (appearing in many large bike films) it is a step-down drop in excess of 20 ft (6.1 m) in both length and height. That being said Cypress does house some more easily ridable trails, still not easy by any means but more accessible. Some of these include: Mystery DH, Stupid Grouse, Slippery Canoe, Upper Tall Cans, Firehose, and Pull Tab. Some of the legendary and most difficult trails are: 5th Horseman, Sex Girl, Shoreplay. One of the original trails is pre-reaper and reaper these are steep trails that used to have some very difficult man made features, sadly most of these were sawed down and destroyed by the government. For more information regarding trails on Cypress there are mountain bike specific maps that include many of the trails and is a great place to start for riding on the mountain.

== Major mountains in the park ==
The lower section of the park contains three main mountains that form Cypress Bowl. The upper, smaller, section includes a series of mountains along a north–south ridge from St. Mark's in the south to Gotha Peak in the far north of the park.

Cypress Bowl (South)

- Mt. Strachan
- Black Mountain
- Hollyburn Mountain.

Howe Sound Crest (North)

- St. Mark's Summit
- Unnecessary Mountain
- The Lions
- Thomas Peak
- David Peak
- James Peak
- Mt. Harvey
- Brunswick Mountain
- Hat Mountain
- Mt. Hanover
- Wettin Peak
- Coburg Peak
- Gotha Peak

== 2010 Olympics ==
A significant part of Vancouver's 2010 Winter Olympics was hosted by Cypress in February 2010, including the snowboard (half-pipe, snowboard cross and parallel giant slalom) and freestyle skiing (moguls and aerials) events, as well as the recently added Skiercross, which used the snowboardcross run, with some modifications. The Freestyle Venue was completed in the Fall of 2006.
