= Howe Sound Crest Trail =

Backpacking trail near Vancouver, Canada

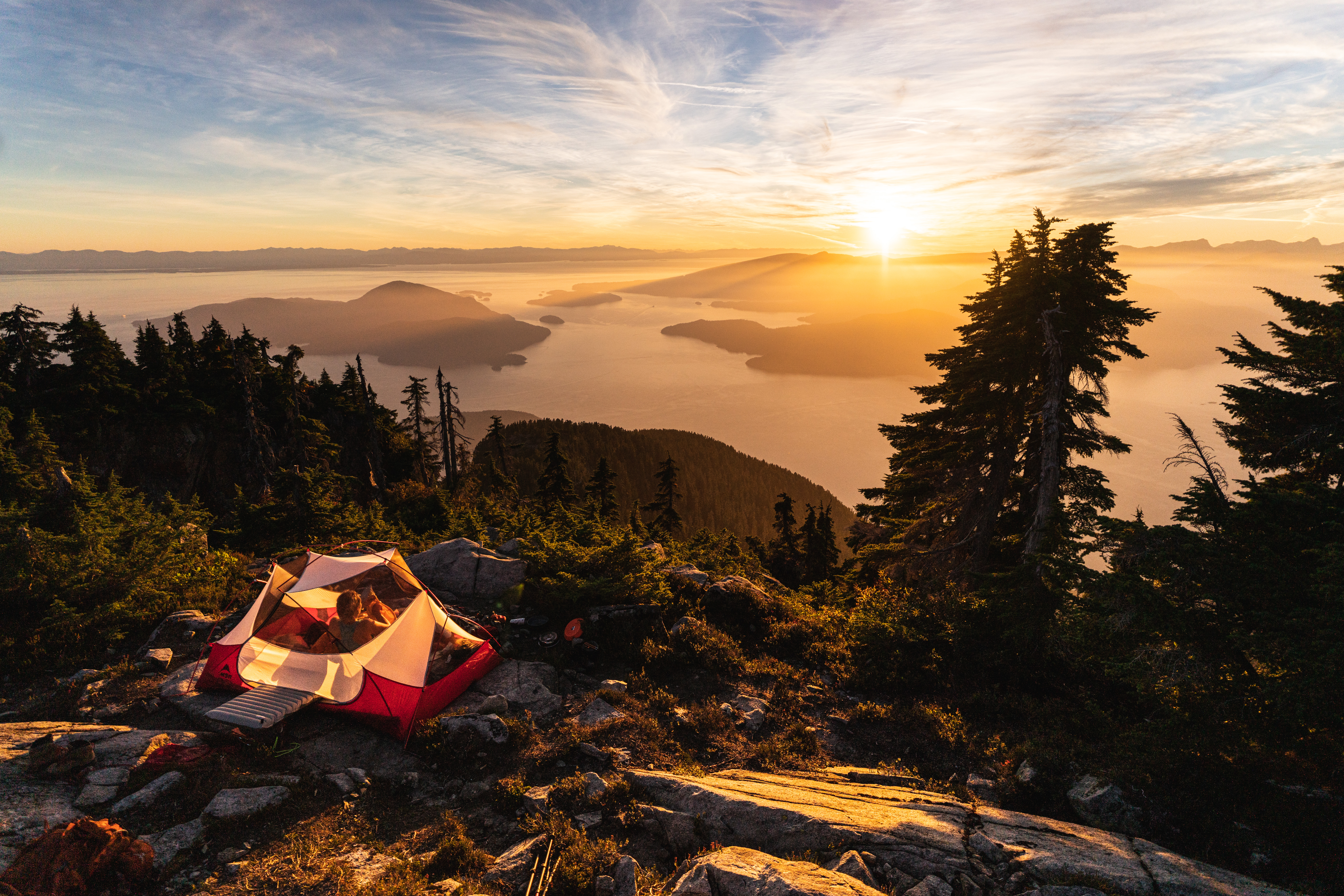
- Camping on Unnecessary Mountain
- Length: 32.8 km (20.4 mi)
- Location: North Shore Mountains, British Columbia, Canada
- Trailheads: Cypress Creek Lodge (south); Sea to Sky Highway at Porteau Road (north)
- Use: Hiking, backpacking, and scrambling
- Highest point: 1,592 m (5,223 ft), South slope of Brunswick Mountain
- Lowest point: 94 m (308 ft), Porteau Road trailhead near Porteau Cove
- Difficulty: Strenuous
- Months: July - October
- Sights: Coast Mountains; Howe Sound; Greater Vancouver
- Hazards: Avalanche; Bears; Cornices; Dehydration; Falling (accident); Hypothermia; Forest fires; Landslides; Severe weather

The Howe Sound Crest Trail (often abbreviated as HSCT) is a rugged 32.8-kilometre (20.4 mi) wilderness hiking trail located near Vancouver, British Columbia, Canada. The trail is located mostly within Cypress Provincial Park and is typically traveled as a single or multi-day hike from south to north, or as a means to access peaks along the route such as Mount Brunswick. It gets its name because it follows the crests of the North Shore Mountains that rise above the Howe Sound, the deep saltwater glacial fjord which parallels the trail to the west. It can be accessed in the south from Cypress Mountain Ski Area and in the north from the Sea to Sky Highway at Porteau Road, or via many intersecting trails that start at Lions Bay.

The trail is maintained by local outdoor groups like the BCMC in partnership with BC Parks.

Despite its short distance, numerous search and rescue calls occur on this trail and its adjacent peaks each year. There are scrambling sections with serious exposure risk, and injuries and deaths are not uncommon. It is typically traveled between July and October due to high avalanche danger and elevated risk during winter conditions, which persist well into the spring.

== Route description ==
The route begins in the south at Cypress Mountain ski area with the choice of two trails that both ascend the western slopes of Mount Strachan. HSCT East is more direct, but HSCT West provides an optional detour to Bowen Lookout around two kilometres (1.2 mi) into the trail. Both trails converge just past Bowen Lookout junction, following a well-maintained gravel trail into Strachan Meadows before climbing steeply to reach Saint Mark's Summit (1,371 metres [4,498 ft]), a popular viewpoint for day hikers. The trail, no longer officially maintained after this point, then descends steeply before an equally steep ascent to Unnecessary Mountain (1,548 metres [5,079 ft]) then traversing rocky terrain to the base of West Lion. At this point, the trail gets more rugged and technical, often resembling a scramble more than a hike with exposed terrain and several roped or chain-assisted sections. After traversing an exposed ledge below West Lion, the trail ascends Thomas Peak (1,540 metres [5,050 ft]) in the col between the Lions before descending a talus field to Enchantment Pass. The next few kilometres follow exposed terrain up and down both James Peak (1,466 metres [4,810 ft]) and David Peak (1,480 metres [4,860 ft]) before descending Harvey Pass to Magnesia Meadows, a popular backcountry camping area. The next four kilometres (2.5 mi) follow the south and west slopes of Brunswick Mountain to the highest point on the trail (1,592 metres [5,223 ft]), with an option to ascend the 1,788-metre (5,866 ft) peak, before descending from Hat Pass to the Brunswick emergency shelter and a series of mountain lakes (Brunswick Lake, Hanover Lake, and Deeks Lake). Upon reaching the logjam at the north end of Deeks Lake, it is a seven-kilometre (4.3 mi) forested descent to Highway 99 at Porteau Cove.

== History ==
The Howe Sound Crest Trail is located within the traditional territories of the Squamish and Tsleil-Waututh peoples who often used the mountains to hunt mountain goats. Evidence of First Nations use has been documented along the trail, including 350-400 year old bark-stripping scars on old-growth yellow cedar trees above Yew Lake. The Lions, the most famous peaks along the trail are known in the Squamish language as Ch'ich'iyúy Elxwíkn, meaning twin sisters, and had their first known ascent by a hunting party guided by Squamish Chief Joe Capilano in 1889.

A trail from Porteau Cove to Deeks Lake was built in the early 20th century to service a hydroelectric dam which provided electricity to Porteau Cove. This trail was later upgraded to a gravel logging road in the 1960s. Mentions of a hiking route from Deeks Lake to Brunswick Mountain area date as early as 1928. The southern route from Cypress Mountain to the Lions, originally known as the Skyline Ridge Trail, was maintained by UBC students and Varsity Outdoors Club members in the 1960s and 1970s. Cypress Provincial Park was created in 1975 to protect the area from clear-cut logging. The park was expanded north along what is now the Howe Sound Crest Trail to Deeks Lake in 1982. A federal grant expended the trail in 1983 from Deeks Lake to Harvey, and from Harvey to the Lions by the late 1980s.

The northern terminus of the trail between Porteau Cove and Deeks Lake is not part of the provincial park, but was on land owned by BC Rail, a crown corporation. In 2001, this land was transferred to Squamish Nation. There were plans to develop the land into a town of 1,400 residences which never came to fruition. In 2017, development company Concord Pacific took ownership of the land. In 2018, a quarry at Kallanhe Creek blocked the existing trail up to Deeks Lake and the trail had to be re-routed along Bertram Creek to preserve access.

Local outdoor groups have criticized the ski resort operator of Cypress Mountain of restricting winter access to provincial park trails like the Howe Sound Crest Trail which passes through the ski area.

== Future Extension ==
There is a long term goal of local outdoor groups like the BCMC to extend the trail north to Squamish, British Columbia. Extensive trail work has already been done to connect the trails at Shannon Creek and the Sea to Sky Gondola to Mountain Lake near Sky Pilot group which is currently accessed from Furry Creek Forest Service Road. Future projects will eventually connect the existing Howe Sound Crest Trail from Deeks Lake and nearby Deeks Peak to Furry Creek FSR, although no official work has begun.

== See also ==
- Baden-Powell Trail
- Sea to Sky Trail
- Sunshine Coast Trail
