= Silver Summit =

Silver Summit may refer to:

== Places ==
In Canada

- Silver Summit, Alberta, a ski area in Yellowhead County

In the United States

- Silver Summit, Utah, a census-designated place in Summit County
