= Silver Summit, Alberta =

Silver Summit
- Interactive map of Silver Summit
- Location: Yellowhead County, Alberta, Canada
- Nearest city: Edson
- Coordinates: 53°53′38″N 116°34′08″W
- Top elevation: 1,448 m (4,751 ft)
- Base elevation: 1,150 m (3,770 ft)
- Skiable area: 2.6 km^{2} (1.0 sq mi)
- Trails: 12
- Longest run: 2.4 km (1.5 mi)
- Lift system: 2 Surface lifts, 1 chairlift
- Snowfall: 305 cm (120 in)
- Website: Silver Summit

Silver Summit was a ski area in Yellowhead County, Alberta, Canada. It is located 50 km (31 mi) north of the town of Edson on Highway 748. Silver Summit had three lifts, one Murry Latta double chairlift, one Doppelmayr T-Bar, and one Rope Tow servicing beginner runs. Silver Summit had seventeen ski trails: seven green, three blue, and seven black.

== History ==
Silver Summit was conceived in the early 1960s by a group of local businessmen, including Paul Melhus from Edmonton, who saw the need for a ski hill outside the Canadian Rockies. Rick Damm, a German former ski jumper, bought the ski resort in 1969. During the year of 1984, a ski jumping complex with K15, K30, and K50 hills were built, all in accordance with FIS standards. The ski jumping facility at Silver Summit opened October 1984 and was the only ski jumping facility until Canada Olympic Park was completed in Calgary. Although the ski jump towers have been demolished, the judge's tower still remains to this day. As of 2024, Silver Summit is not intended for use as a ski area again, in accordance with the current owners of the property.
