= Parkbus =

Canadian bus transportation organization

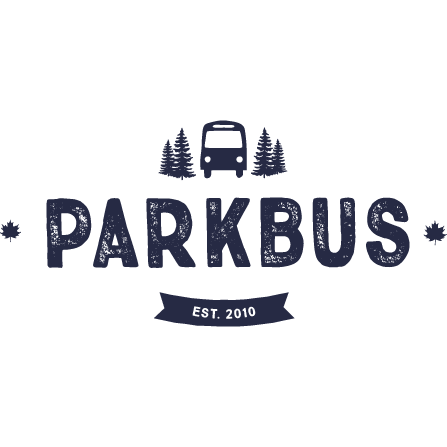
- Industry: Tourism, Transportation
- Founded: 2010 in Toronto, Ontario, Canada
- Key people: Boris Issaev, Alex Berlyand, Co-Founders
- Website: parkbus.ca

Parkbus is a Canadian not-for-profit organization that provides bus transportation from major cities to nearby parks and conservation areas. Its purpose is to enable citizens to access nature and the outdoors without owning a car.

Parkbus started in 2010 as a private initiative developed by a group of outdoor enthusiasts. A pilot project route between Toronto and Algonquin Provincial Park began in 2010. Since then, Parkbus has become a project within Ontario not-for-profit organization Transportation Options, which works to provide sustainable tourism and transportation in the province of Ontario.

Parkbus operates one-day, overnight, guided overnight, and seasonal routes departing from Toronto, Vancouver, Montreal, Ottawa and Halifax.

== Programs ==
=== TD Park Express ===
Since 2017, Parkbus operates seasonal free shuttles from Toronto to Rouge National Urban Park, from Edmonton to Elk Island National Park, and from Vancouver to Cypress Provincial Park.

=== NatureLink ===
Parkbus provides free transportation to natural parks for non-profits and other organizations that work with new immigrants and low income residents.

=== Ottawa - Gatineau Park Shuttle ===
In July 2019, Parkbus and the National Capital Commission announced a pilot bus service connecting downtown Ottawa and Gatineau Park in Quebec
