= Cypress Mountain Ski Area =

Ski resort in British Columbia, Canada

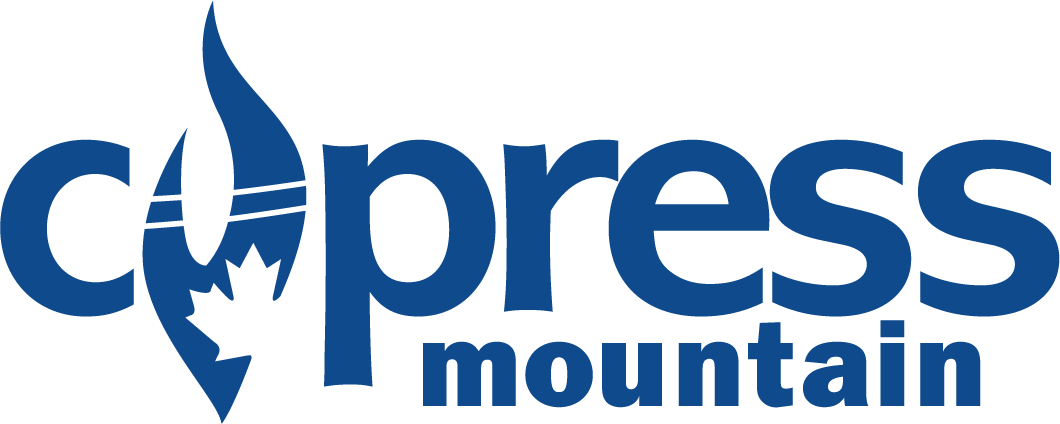

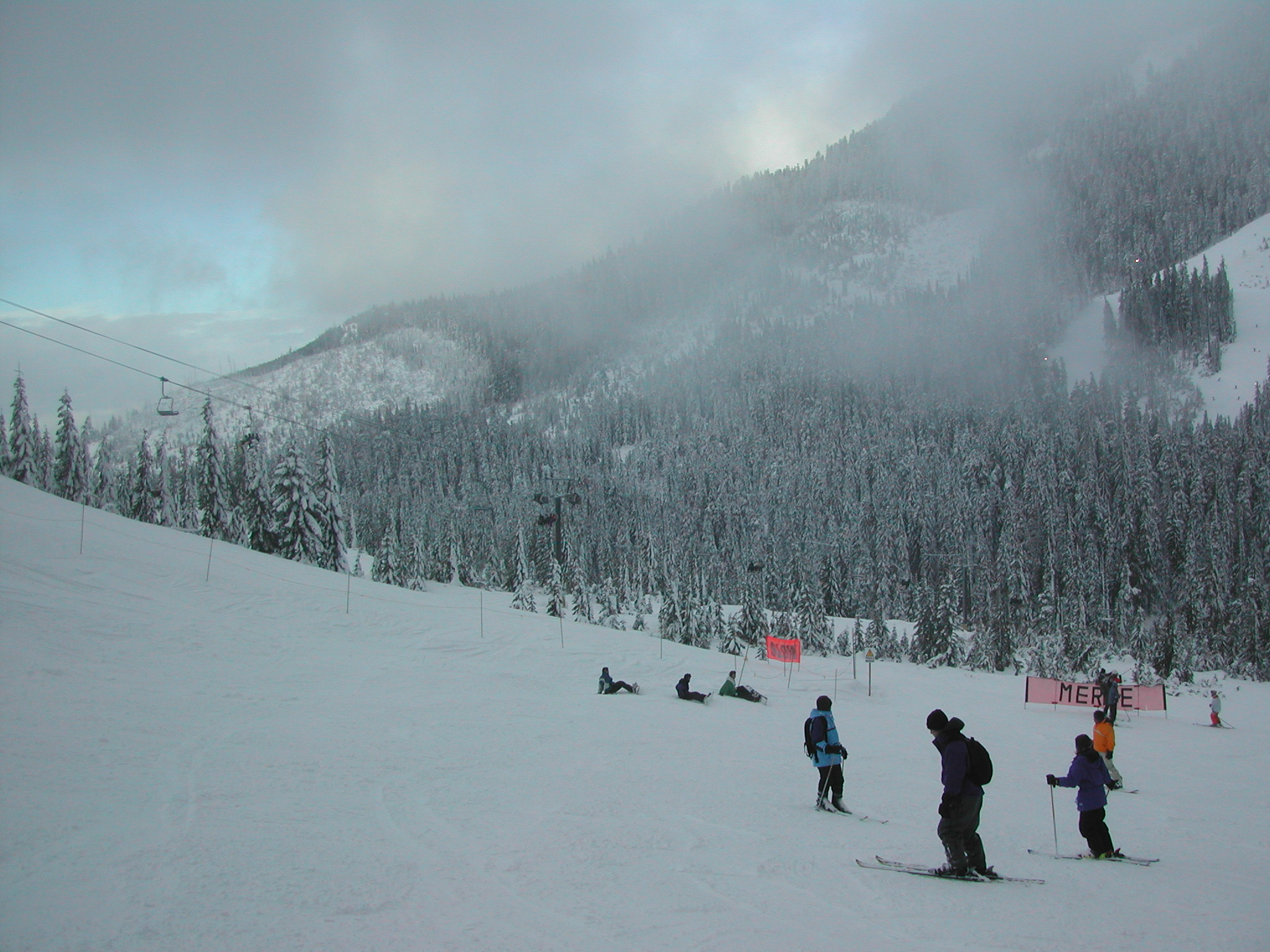
- Skiers at Cypress Mountain
- Interactive map of Cypress Mountain Ski Area
- Location: Cypress Provincial Park, British Columbia; Canada
- Nearest city: West Vancouver
- Coordinates: 49°23′44″N 123°12′12″W
- Status: Operating
- Opened: 1970
- Owner: Boyne Resorts
- Vertical: 614 m (2,014 ft)
- Top elevation: 1,440 m (4,720 ft)
- Base elevation: 826 m (2,710 ft)
- Skiable area: 240 hectares (600 acres)
- Trails: 53; Beginner 13% Intermediate 35% Advanced 37% Expert 8% Freestyle Terrain 8%
- Longest run: 4.1 km (2.5 mi)
- Lift system: 6 chairlifts 1 magic carpet 2 surface lifts
- Snowfall: 622 cm (245 in)
- Website: cypressmountain.com

Cypress Mountain is a ski area in West Vancouver, British Columbia, Canada, located in the southern section of Cypress Provincial Park, operated under a BC Parks Park Use Permit.

The ski resort is a 30-minute drive north of downtown Vancouver, and has 53 named alpine ski runs (many accessible for night skiing) and 19 km of cross country trails. Snowshoeing tours are also popular. Snow schools and rentals, Cypress Creek Grill, Gold Medal Cafe and Crazy Raven Bar and Grill and a Big Bear Sports retail shop are also located on the premises in the Cypress Creek Lodge.

Cypress Mountain hosted the Freestyle Skiing and Snowboarding events of the 2010 Winter Olympics, including SkiCross as a demonstration sport, and the first running of Snowboardcross as a Medal sport.

The ski area's downhill runs are built on two mountains (Mount Strachan /strɔːn/ strawn – 1,440 metres (4,720 ft) and Black Mountain – 1,200 metres (3,900 ft), on a vertical rise of 610 metres (2,000 ft).

The resort is legally known as Cypress Bowl Recreational Limited Partnership, previously owned by Boyne Resorts, then sold to CNL Income Properties, then Och-Ziff Capital Management, but Boyne Canada has continued to run the ski operation for several years under a lease-back agreement. Boyne repurchased the resort in March 2018.

The ski resort name Cypress Mountain is derived from the name of the bowl between the three mountains, Mount Strachan, Black Mountain, and Hollyburn Mountain – "Cypress Bowl", which was the original and still-used common name of the resort (the facilities by Cypress Bowl Recreations Ltd.). The term cypress comes from the yellow cedar tree Cupressus nootkatensis which is common in the park at altitudes over 800 metres, and is also known as yellow cypress, as well as from the name of the park in which the ski operation is located.

Despite the resort name, there is in fact no mountain named Cypress Mountain in the park.

== History ==
=== Original Ski Area ===
In the 1870s, a logging road was cut through the thick forest on the mountain now known as Hollyburn Mountain. The mountain was first ascended in 1908 by members of the Vancouver Mountaineering Club. By the 1920s and 30s, multiple ski clubs had established themselves there, and the Hollyburn Lodge was built there in 1926.

In 1948, a rope tow was built on the "Popfly" from the Hollyburn Lodge across First Lake, and on January 17, 1951, the Hollyburn single person chairlift was opened, bringing skiers from Hat Inn at the base of the mountain to the Highview Lookout at 850m elevation. It was designed by the Riblet Tramway Company, which brought prefabricated materials for the towers, the chairs, and the loading platforms. Hollyburners who had originally used a variety of logging roads to reach the ski area could now look forward to a 12 minute ride up the mountain. The Hi-View Lodge was also built beside the top of the chairlift. However the top station of the chairlift burned down in June 1965, along with the Hi-View lodge. It was believed to be intentionally set.

On November 23, 1963 a Royal Canadian Navy T-33 Jet crashed while on a training flight near the present day Sky Quad chairlift on Mt. Strachan, killing both pilots. In 2014, a memorial plaque was erected at the crash site.

=== Present-Day Downhill Ski Area ===
The present day downhill ski area was initially opened by BC Parks in January 1976, after two Murray-Latta double-chairs, the Green chair and the Black chair, were constructed on Mt. Strachan and Black Mountain. The Cypress Bowl road leading up to the resort had previously been completed the year before, at the cost of $13 million.

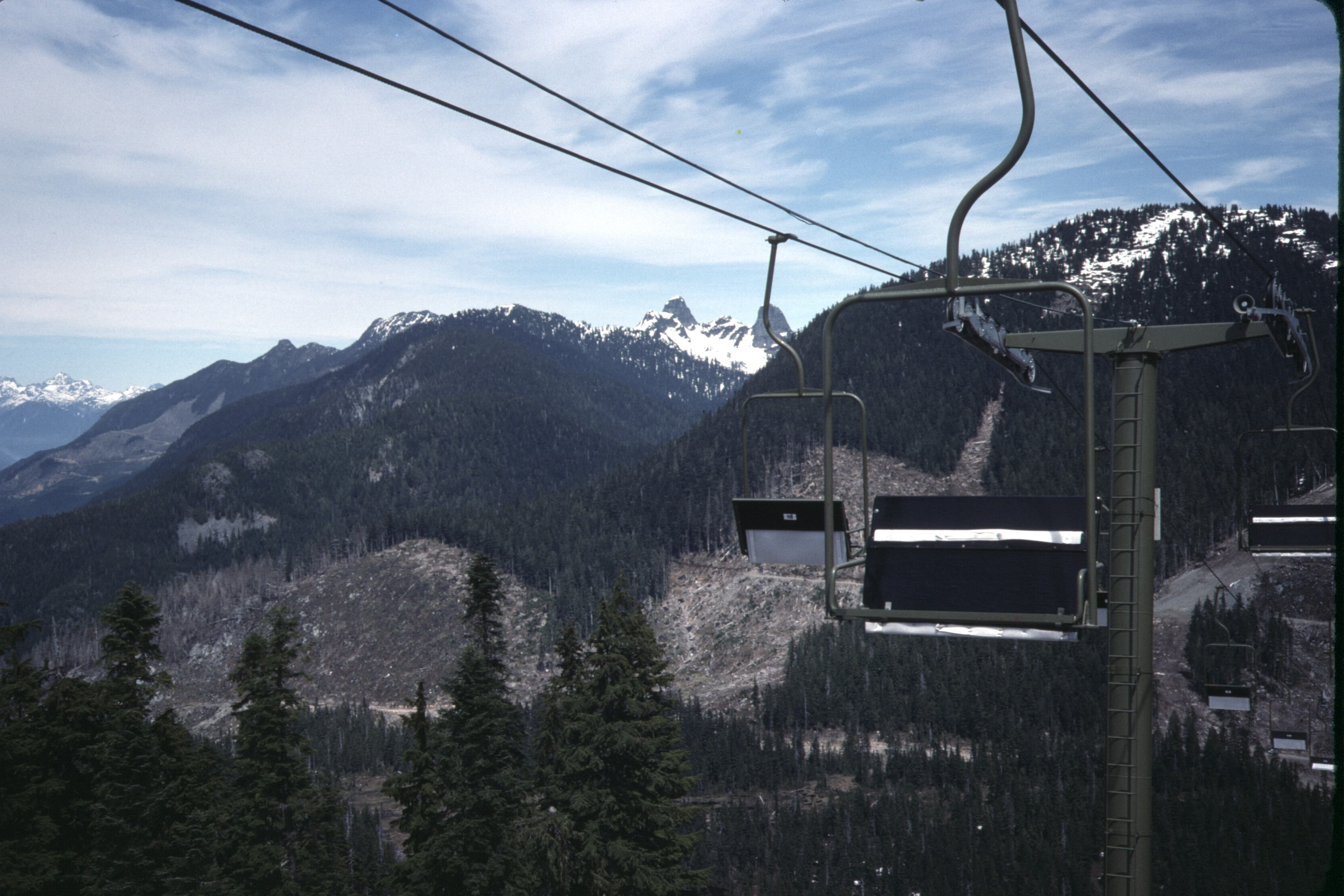
The old Black Chair on Black Mountain, with Mt. Strachan and The Lions visible in the background

Cypress Bowl Recreations took over the resort in 1984, and Night skiing was added in 1985 on those two chairs. In 1987, the Sky Chair was installed at the peak of Mt. Strachan, opening up new terrain and reaching the highest point on either mountain. The chair was a Mueller double relocated from Apex Mountain Resort.

Cypress was the first ski resort in BC to allow snowboarding, doing so on March 15, 1987.

Another double-chair, the Midway Chair, was installed in 1990 on the lower slopes of Mt. Strachan. In 1997, the original double chair on Mt. Strachan was replaced with a Poma fixed-grip quad, the Sunrise chair, following the same lift line. After Cypress was purchased by Boyne Resorts in 2001, the original chairlift on Black Mountain was replaced by the Eagle Express, a detachable quad chair built by Doppelmayr. Additionally, the rope tow in the beginners area was replaced with a fixed-grip quad chair, the Easy Rider Quad Chair.

In 2007, the Sunrise quad chair was replaced with the Lions Express Quad Chair, another Doppelmayr detachable quad chair. This reduced the ride time up Mt. Strachan by nearly half. The former Sunrise chair was moved across to Black Mountain and was installed on new terrain, which opened 9 new ski trails. This chair is now called the Raven Ridge Quad Chair.

In 2022 Cypress closed the aging Sky Chair and built the Sky Quad, A fixed-grip quad lift with a loading conveyor belt. The lift opened December 18, 2022 according to social media posts. after delays due to a construction helicopter needing to conduct an emergency drop of a construction load due to unexpected sudden weather. No persons were injured during the mishap.

== Climate ==
Cypress Mountain has a subarctic climate (Köppen: Dfc) using the 0˚C isotherm or an subpolar oceanic climate (Köppen Cfc) using the -3 ˚C isotherm. Summer days are mild with cool nights, while winters are long, moderately cold, and contain extreme amounts of precipitation.

Climate data for Hollyburn Ridge (Cypress Mountain) (Elevation: 930.00 m) 1971−2000
Month	Jan	Feb	Mar	Apr	May	Jun	Jul	Aug	Sep	Oct	Nov	Dec	Year
Record high °C (°F)	17.8 (64.0)	16.7 (62.1)	17.5 (63.5)	22.5 (72.5)	30.5 (86.9)	31.7 (89.1)	33.3 (91.9)	32.0 (89.6)	30.5 (86.9)	26.7 (80.1)	22.2 (72.0)	12.8 (55.0)	33.3 (91.9)
Mean daily maximum °C (°F)	1.1 (34.0)	2.5 (36.5)	3.9 (39.0)	6.6 (43.9)	10.5 (50.9)	13.3 (55.9)	17.5 (63.5)	17.7 (63.9)	15.3 (59.5)	9.2 (48.6)	2.6 (36.7)	0.6 (33.1)	8.4 (47.1)
Daily mean °C (°F)	−1.4 (29.5)	−0.4 (31.3)	0.8 (33.4)	3.0 (37.4)	6.3 (43.3)	9.0 (48.2)	12.6 (54.7)	13.0 (55.4)	10.6 (51.1)	5.8 (42.4)	0.3 (32.5)	−1.8 (28.8)	4.8 (40.6)
Mean daily minimum °C (°F)	−4.0 (24.8)	−3.2 (26.2)	−2.4 (27.7)	−0.6 (30.9)	2.0 (35.6)	4.7 (40.5)	7.6 (45.7)	8.2 (46.8)	5.9 (42.6)	2.3 (36.1)	−2.0 (28.4)	−4.1 (24.6)	1.2 (34.2)
Record low °C (°F)	−21.7 (−7.1)	−20.0 (−4.0)	−15.0 (5.0)	−8.3 (17.1)	−4.4 (24.1)	−2.2 (28.0)	0.0 (32.0)	0.6 (33.1)	−3.9 (25.0)	−14.0 (6.8)	−20.0 (−4.0)	−26.7 (−16.1)	−26.7 (−16.1)
Average precipitation mm (inches)	310.0 (12.20)	301.4 (11.87)	249.7 (9.83)	177.6 (6.99)	177.6 (6.99)	155.7 (6.13)	120.2 (4.73)	120.7 (4.75)	149.0 (5.87)	299.9 (11.81)	389.7 (15.34)	354.0 (13.94)	2,805.4 (110.45)
Average rainfall mm (inches)	173.1 (6.81)	164.6 (6.48)	139.7 (5.50)	107.1 (4.22)	167.9 (6.61)	155.4 (6.12)	120.2 (4.73)	120.7 (4.75)	148.4 (5.84)	285.6 (11.24)	284.1 (11.19)	213.2 (8.39)	2,080.4 (81.91)
Average snowfall cm (inches)	136.9 (53.9)	136.9 (53.9)	110.0 (43.3)	70.5 (27.8)	9.6 (3.8)	0.2 (0.1)	0.0 (0.0)	0.0 (0.0)	0.1 (0.0)	14.3 (5.6)	105.7 (41.6)	141.9 (55.9)	726.1 (285.9)
Average precipitation days (≥ 0.2 mm)	17.6	16.5	16.4	15.2	12.6	12.9	8.5	9.0	10.0	15.1	19.3	18.9	172.0
Average rainy days (≥ 0.2 mm)	8.8	8.2	8	9.7	11.8	12.8	8.5	9	9.9	14.1	12.7	9.0	122.5
Average snowy days (≥ 0.2 cm)	12.2	11.3	11.2	8.3	2.2	0.09	0.0	0.0	0.09	2.4	10.9	13.6	72.28
Source: Environment Canada (normals, 1981−2010)

== Amenities (Alpine skiing) ==
Cypress Mountain Resort has six chair lifts which include two high-speed detachable quad chairlifts (Eagle Express and the Lions Express), three fixed-grip quad chairs (Raven Ridge, Sky Quad and Easy Rider) and one double chairlift (Midway.) There is also a magic carpet and magic go round in the kids camp area and a tube park tow.

Lift Name	Length	Vertical	Type	Ride Time	Hourly Capacity	Mountain	Make	Year Built
Lions Express Quad Chair	1,050 metres (3,440 ft)	360 metres (1,180 ft)	High Speed Quad	4 min	2,400	Mt. Strachan	Doppelmayr	2007
Eagle Express Quad Chair	847 m	259 m	High Speed Quad	4 min	2,400	Black Mountain	Doppelmayr	2001
Raven Ridge Quad	1,180 m	356 m	Quad Chairlift	11 min	2,000	Black Mountain	Poma	2007
Easy Rider Quad	301 m	51 m	Quad Chairlift	3 min	1,500	Mt. Strachan	Doppelmayr	2001
Sky Quad	575 m	183 m	Quad Chairlift	4 min	1,808	Mt. Strachan	Doppelmayr	2022
Midway Chair	460 m	130 m	Double Chairlift	4 min	1,000	Mt. Strachan	Mueller	1990

== Runs ==
There are 53 runs including 5 green runs, 23 blue runs, 21 black runs, and 12 double black runs which 8 of them being glades. The longest run is a combination of runs, the T-33-Collins combination, which measures 4.1 km and the shortest run is the run Rideout, which measures about 10 meters. Below is a list of runs.

Top 16 Longest Runs
Runs	Length (ft)	Descent (ft)	Difficulty
Collins	5280	1161	Easiest
Panorama	5255	888	Easiest
Horizon	4562	1143	Intermediate
Benny's	4087	896	Intermediate
3 Bears	3753	576	Intermediate
Fork	3480	888	Intermediate
Top Gun	2976	1024	Expert only
T-33	2571	594	Intermediate
Humpty Dumpty	2344	636	Intermediate
Jasey Jay	2158	643	Intermediate
First Sun	2099	892	Advanced
Rainbow	1955	635	Advanced
Slash	1921	732	Advanced
Crazy Raven	1888	733	Intermediate
Windjammer	1814	385	Easiest
Ripcord	1655	564	Advanced

== Amenities (Nordic skiing) ==
Cypress Mountain Resort is home to the only Nordic (cross country) ski trails in the Lower Mainland region of British Columbia, and is located on 30 minutes from the downtown core via car. The Nordic trails at Hollyburn Ridge provide a mix of terrain over 19 kilometers of groomed and track set trails with 7.5 kilometers of trails being lit for night skiing. Hollyburn Lodge (constructed in 1926, renovated in 2016) has a long and rich history supporting early backcountry ski enthusiasts, Nordic skiers, and snowshoers. Nordic operations elevation: 886 metres.

== 2010 Winter Olympics ==
During the Vancouver 2010 Olympic Winter Games, Cypress hosted all of the freestyle skiing and snowboarding competitions (moguls, aerials, ski cross, half-pipe, snowboard cross and parallel giant slalom). The half-pipe and the venues for the moguls and aerials were completed in the summer of 2007. Just before the games and due to unseasonably mild conditions, the ski resort was almost free of snow, where the snow had to be airlifted by helicopters and transported by trucks from higher elevations.

== See also ==
- List of ski areas and resorts in Canada
- Cypress Provincial Park
- Mount Seymour
- Mount Seymour Provincial Park
- Grouse Mountain
- The Lions
