= Unnecessary Mountain =

Mountain in British Columbia, Canada

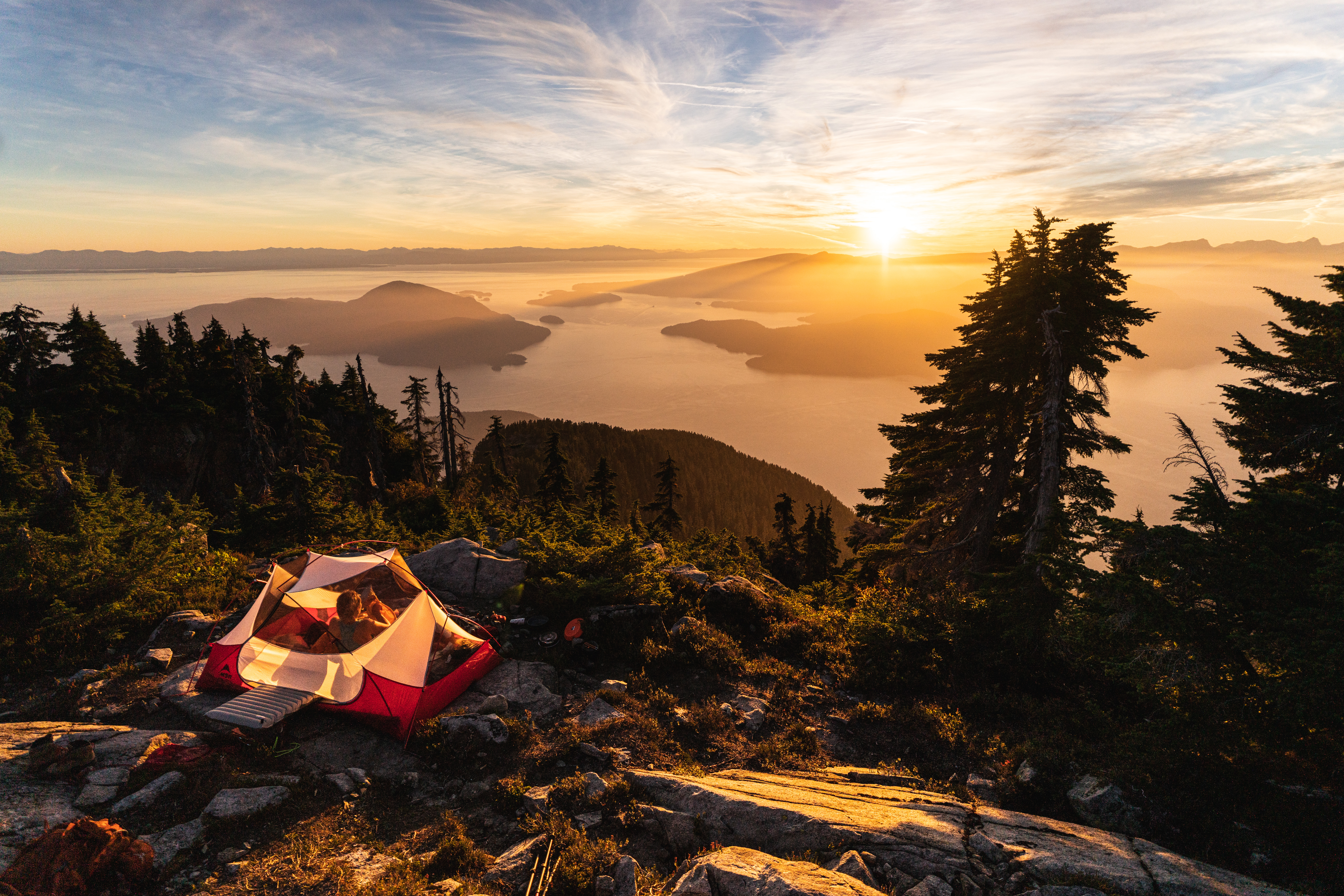
- Camping on Unnecessary Mountain

Highest point
- Elevation: 1,548 m (5,079 ft)
- Prominence: 123 m (404 ft)
- Parent peak: West Lion (1,654m)
- Listing: Mountains of British Columbia
- Coordinates: 49°26′54″N 123°11′53″W

Geography
- Location within Greater Vancouver Regional District Location within British Columbia
- Interactive map of Unnecessary Mountain
- Location: British Columbia, Canada
- Region: Metro Vancouver Regional District
- District: New Westminster Land District
- Parent range: North Shore Mountains
- Topo map: NTS 92G6 North Vancouver

Unnecessary Mountain, also called Mount Unnecessary, is a peak in the North Shore Mountains near Vancouver, British Columbia, Canada and a popular hiking destination. Its two summits are within Cypress Provincial Park, accessible via the Howe Sound Crest Trail and the Unnecessary Mountain Trail from Lions Bay. The taller south summit has an elevation of 1,548 m (5,079 ft) and its north summit is slightly lower at 1,543 m (5,062 ft).

The mountain is so named because of an "unnecessary" ascent over this mountain to reach The Lions.

In December 2014, a rockslide killed 7-year-old Erin Kate Moore as she was hiking with a group on Unnecessary Mountain.
