= Mount Troubridge (Sunshine Coast) =

Mountain in British Columbia, Canada

- Location within qathet Regional District Location within British Columbia Location within Canada
- Interactive map of Mount Troubridge

Highest point
- Elevation: 1,304 m (4,278 ft)
- Prominence: 949 m (3,114 ft)
- Parent peak: Mount Calder (1,469 m)
- Isolation: 10.32 km (6.41 mi)
- Listing: Mountains of British Columbia
- Coordinates: 49°48′44″N 124°10′07″W

Geography
- Country: Canada
- Province: British Columbia
- Region: qathet Regional District
- District: New Westminster Land District
- Parent range: Pacific Ranges
- Topo map: NTS 92F16 Haslam Lake

Mount Troubridge is a 1,304-metre (4,278 ft) mountain in the Sunshine Coast region of British Columbia, Canada. The mountain is part of the Pacific Ranges, a major subrange of the Coast Mountains. It is located on the SE side of Lois Lake above Saltery Bay, an unincorporated coastal community on the Jervis Inlet near the city of Powell River. The mountain is named for Rear Admiral Sir Thomas Troubridge.

Mount Troubridge is a popular destination for outdoor recreation year-round, especially for hiking and snowshoeing. The mountain is known for its extensive stands of old-growth temperate rainforest forest and many vistas of the surrounding mountains and inlets.

== Recreation ==
The mountain is accessible via the Sunshine Coast Trail, a wilderness hiking trail that traverses the qathet Regional District. The summit of Mount Troubridge is the highest point of the entire 180 km (110 mi) trail. The most common approach is the East Mount Troubridge Trail which is 7.7 km from the Saltery Bay Main logging road near Rainy Day Lake. Hikers approaching from Lois Lake reservoir in the west, can use the 9 km Elephant Lakes Trail then the 6 km West Mount Troubridge Trail to the summit. There is a short loop trail on the summit plateau.

There are two wilderness huts on Mount Troubridge. The Troubridge Hut is a fully winterized cabin that sleeps ten people, while the Troubridge Emergency Shelter at the summit can sleep four. There are additional huts nearby on Mount Troubridge's lower slopes such as the Golden Stanley Hut near Lois Lake and the Rainy Day Lake Hut.

== See also ==
- Clendinning Range
- Shíshálh Nation
