= Murray-Latta =

British Columbian manufacturer

The Murray-Latta Machine Company is a British Columbian machine manufacturing and steel fabrication company founded in 1918. In the 1960s and 1970s, they built a number of chairlifts, mainly in British Columbia. Although they no longer design or fabricate chairlifts, they still provide parts and act as contractors for constructing new lifts designed by other manufacturers.

The "Dinosaur" Murray-Latta lift in operation at Snoqualmie Pass, WA.

The main reason Murray-Latta entered the skilift market in the first place can be attributed to Premier W. A. C. Bennett, who promoted British Columbian business. Using a British Columbian company to construct chairlifts at the government-owned ski areas at Cypress Mountain, Mount Seymour, and Manning Park (Gibson Pass) was a natural choice.

The company also built lifts outside British Columbia at the Mt. Baker Ski Area (WA), Hyak ski area (now known as Summit East) on Snoqualmie Pass, Washington, and Jackson Hole, Wyoming.

The most notable design aspect of Murray-Latta chairlifts is the way the cable carrying the loaded chairs can sometimes sag as much as 10 feet (3.0 m) below the unloaded cable during long gaps between support towers.
