= Sunshine Coast Trail =

Hiking trail in British Columbia, Canada

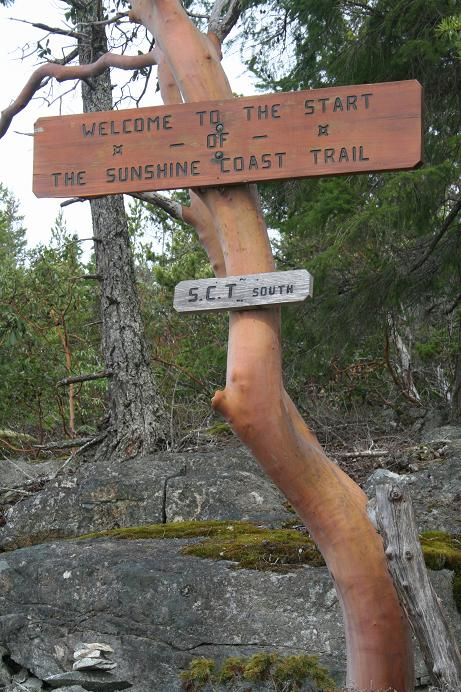
- Length: 180 km (112 mi)
- Location: Sunshine Coast (British Columbia)
- Established: 2000
- Trailheads: Multiple access points Sarah Point (north); 50.0588°N 124.8371°W Saltery Bay (south); 49.7842°N 124.1747°W
- Use: Hiking Backpacking Camping Snowshoeing
- Highest point: Mount Troubridge, 1,304 m (4,278 ft)
- Website: https://sunshinecoasttrail.com/

The Sunshine Coast Trail is a 180 km (112 mi) wilderness hiking trail in the Sunshine Coast region of British Columbia, Canada. The trail traverses the qathet Regional District from Sarah Point on the Desolation Sound in the north to the BC Ferries terminal at Saltery Bay on Jervis Inlet in the south. The trail goes within close proximity of the communities of Powell River, Lang Bay, Lund, and Teeshohsum, through public, private and Tla'amin Nation treaty lands. It connects provincial parks such as Malaspina Provincial Park and Inland Lake Provincial Park, as well as many recreation sites and regional parks.

The Sunshine Coast Trail is notable for being the longest hut-to-hut hiking trail in Canada. Campgrounds are also available alongside the huts, and there are number access points to the trail, providing multiple options for shorter trips. It traverses a wide range of environments such as temperate rainforests, mountains, coastlines, lakes, and rivers.

== History ==
In 1992, outdoor enthusiasts formed the non-profit Powell River Parks and Wilderness Society, now called the qathet Parks and Wilderness Society (qPAWS), with the idea of creating a hiking corridor to protect and access the increasingly vanishing old-growth forests in the Upper Sunshine Coast region. The Sunshine Coast Trail was completed in 2000 and outdoor groups began building wilderness huts along the route in 2009. The trail has 16 public huts as of 2021, two huts are managed by BC Parks and require a small user fee while the remaining huts are free and maintained by qPAWS and other outdoor groups.

== Sections ==
A list of trail sections from north to south as featured in The Sunshine Coast Trail Guidebook:

#	Section Name	Note	KM
1	Land's End Trail (Sarah Point)	Sarah Point Hut & Trailhead	0
		Sarah Point Campsite	0.6
		Feather Cove Campsite	2.8
		Bliss Portage Hut	8.2
		Wednesday Lake Campsite	12
2	Gwendoline Hills Trail		12.1
		Manzanita Hut	16
3	Thunder Ridge Trail		21.3
		Fern Gully Creek Campsite	22.6
4	Toquenatch Trail		25.2
		Plummer Creek Campsite	25.8
5	Marathon Trail	Homestead Campsite	28.9
		Rieveley Pond Hut	33.5
6	Appleton Canyon Trail	Appleton Creek Campsite	35.6
7	Tla'amin (Sliammon) Lakes Trail		37.7
		Kokanee Campsite	40
		Shangri-La Shelter & Campsite	43.1
8	Scout Mountain Trail		45.6
9	Mowat Bay Trail		50.6
10	Tony's Trail		52.8
		Tony's Point Campsite	55.4
11	Lost Lake Trail		58.3
12	Inland Lake Trail		62.8
		Inland Lake West Hut	64
13	Confederation Lake Trail	Anthony Island Hut	66.8
14	Fiddlehead Trail	Confederation Lake Hut	74.1
15	West Tinhat Mountain	Fiddlehead Landing Hut	81.4
16	Tinhat Mountain Trail	Tinhat Cabin	89.3
17	Lewis Lake Trail		93
		East Lewis Hobbit Campsite	93.8
19	March Lake Trail		98
		March Lake Campsite	107.2
		Elk Lake Hut	109.3
20	Elk Lake Loop		110.3
20	Walt Hill Trail		114.3
		Coyote Lake Campsite	116
		Walt Hill Hut	123.4
21	Suicide Pass Trail		126
		Suicide Pass Campsite	127
22	Smokey's Blue Ridge Trail		128.1
		Deer Creek emergency camp	130.6
23	Eagle River Trail		132.3
24	Lois Lakeshore Trail		136.9
		Br.41 Campground	139.7
		Lois Point Campsite	141.5
25	Elephant Lake Trail		144.5
		Golden Stanley Hut	144.9
		Br.42 - Jessie's Carved Chair Campsite	147.2
26	West Mount Troubridge Trail		154.1
		Mount Troubridge Hut	157.6
		Troubridge Emergency Shelter	159
27	East Mount Troubridge Trail		159.3
		View Bluffs Campsite	160
28	Rainy Day Lake Trail		167.2
		Rainy Day Lake Hut	169
29	Fairview Bay Trail		169.5
		Fairview Bay Hut	171.2
		Pirate Cove picnic site	176
		Saltery Bay Trailhead	178
30	Saltery Bay Trail / Blue Grouse Ridge		168.5
		Saltery Bay Trailhead	178

== See also ==
West Coast Trail

North Coast Trail

Howe Sound Crest Trail
