= The Lions (peaks) =

Pair of pointed peaks in the country of Canada

West Lion
- Location within Greater Vancouver Regional District

Highest point
- Elevation: 1,654 m (5,427 ft)
- Prominence: 369 m (1,211 ft)
- Coordinates: 49°27′28″N 123°11′11″W

Geography
- Location: British Columbia, Canada
- Region: Metro Vancouver Regional District
- District: New Westminster Land District
- Parent range: Howe Sound Group
- Topo map: NTS 92G6 North Vancouver

Climbing
- First ascent: 1889 H. Bell-Irving; Chief Joe Capilano; Squamish First Nation
- Easiest route: class 3–4 scramble

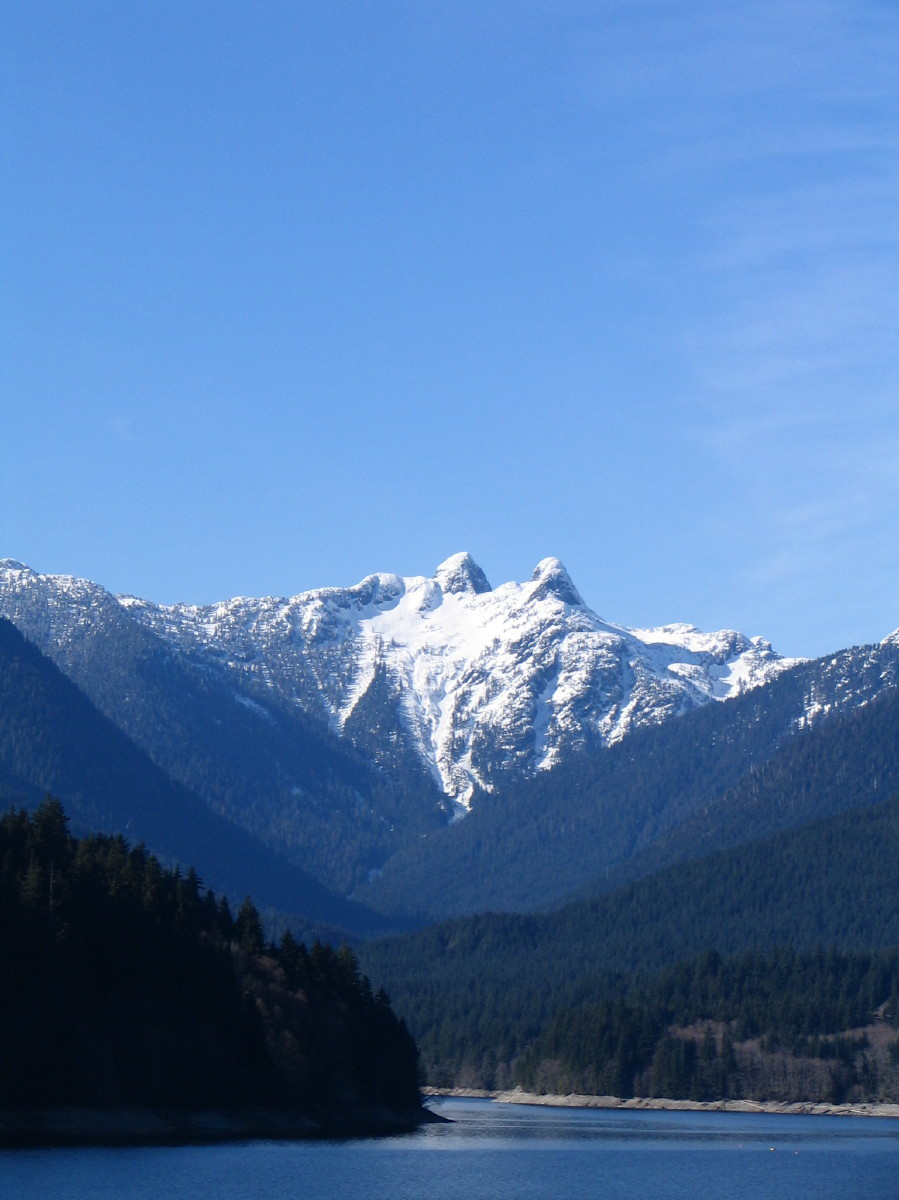
The Lions seen from Cleveland Dam at Capilano Lake, in the District of North Vancouver

East Lion
- Location within Greater Vancouver Regional District

Highest point
- Elevation: 1,606 m (5,269 ft)
- Prominence: 121 m (397 ft)
- Coordinates: 49°27′22″N 123°10′52″W

Geography
- Location: British Columbia, Canada
- District: New Westminster Land District
- Parent range: Howe Sound Group
- Topo map: NTS 92G/06

Climbing
- First ascent: 1903 W. Latta; J. Latta; R. Latta
- Easiest route: class 4 scramble

The Lions are a pair of pointed peaks (West Lion – 1,646 m (5,400 ft); East Lion – 1,606 m (5,269 ft)) along the North Shore Mountains in Metro Vancouver, British Columbia, Canada. They can be seen from much of the Greater Vancouver area, as far as Robert Burnaby Park in East Burnaby, south to parts of Surrey, and from the west on the Howe Sound Islands and the Sunshine Coast. Along with the Lions Gate Bridge named in their honour, these twin summits have become one of the most recognizable Vancouver landmarks. The city's BC Lions CFL football team is also named in their honour. Lions Gate Entertainment which was founded in Vancouver in July, 1997 is also named for the peaks.

== Geology ==
The Lions are composed of hornblende diorite, the oldest plutonic rock on the West Coast of Canada.

== Hiking and rock climbing routes ==
Hikers can climb up to the ridge between the East and West Lion peaks using either the Binkert Trail leading up from Lions Bay, or the Howe Sound Crest Trail. The Binkert Trail, named after Paul Binkert of the British Columbia Mountaineering Club, is one of the most popular in the Lower Mainland. Hiking to the ridge from Lions Bay takes approximately four hours and gains 1,280 m (4,199 ft) in elevation. Most hikers stop there as both the East and West Lion peaks require rock climbing equipment and expertise. The East Lion is out-of-bounds for climbing as it is located in the Greater Vancouver watershed.

== Early ascents ==
According, to an article by Steven Threndyle in The Greater Vancouver Book, "the earliest recorded climb of the West Lion in 1889 happened almost by accident. A group of hunters following a herd of goats found themselves at the top with no place to go but down. The hunting party was guided by Squamish First Nations Chief Joe Capilano. One of the members of the hunting team was Doctor Henry Bell-Irving, who asked Chief Capilano if he could time one of the chief's young natives to see how long it would take him to run from the base of the West Lion to the summit. The youth stripped completely naked, made the round trip ascent and descent in under 20 minutes.

The first recorded ascent, and the account with more certainty, is the August 11, 1903, ascent by celebrated BCMC climbers Atwell King (1877–1947) (after whom Atwell Peak on Mt. Garibaldi is named), George Martin, and Arthur Tinniswood Dalton (1883–1962) (after whom Dalton Dome is named). They took the Terminal Steamship boat from Vancouver to Hood Point on Bowen Island, and then sailed with the innkeeper across to the east shore of Howe Sound, near present-day Lions Bay. They then commenced what would have been a shredding bushwhack up to West Lion, roped together for safety during much of the ascent. Atwell King reported to the Vancouver Daily Province that he had “...been on Crown Mountain and thought the view from there was exceedingly fine, but the prospect from The Lions is infinitely more magnificent.”

With its steep granitic face, the East Lion was believed to be impossible to scale. That did not deter John Latta and his two brothers from setting out to climb the East Lion in 1903. Hearing that climbers often used ropes for mountaineering ascents, they packed one along but actually had no idea of how to use it. Their technique was to grasp the small shrubs and bushes growing out of the cracks in the rock. The Latta brothers also climbed the West Lion on their way out.

== "The Sisters" ==
The Indigenous Squamish people named these two prominent peaks "Ch'ích'iyúy Elx̱wíḵn" (translates as 'Twin Sisters'). These mountains remain sacred for their legal marker of a peace treaty, family lineage histories, and spiritual value. The two peaks were transformed by the Sky Brothers, or Transformers, after twin sisters that had married with Haida twins created the path for the war to end between the Squamish and Haida people. The families that made the Peace Treaty and married together still live in the Squamish and Haida Nations.

In another version of the myth, the Haida (Stek’in in Squamish), the mortal enemies of the Squamish, travelled down the coast to raid and enslave the Squamish. Among the Haida raiders were young twin brothers who were the son of a Haida chief. The brothers were given the task of guarding the canoes while the elder raiders scouted out the target village. The Haida boys grew restless and climbed up a ridge to view the Squamish village themselves. At sunrise they were surprised to see that the first Squamish villagers up were twin sisters. The Haida raided, killing many Squamish. The twin sisters were spared and given over to the brothers as wives, who returned to the north with them. Among the Haida the Squamish wives were admired but sad. They persuaded their new Haida family to seek peace with the Squamish, which the Squamish accepted. The Creator commemorated their peacekeeping by making them into immortal mountains.

Sometime around 1890, British Columbia Supreme Court Justice John Hamilton Gray proposed that Canada rename the mountain peaks to lions couchant from heraldry, or in reference to the lion statues in Trafalgar Square sculpted by Sir Edwin Landseer.

== Gallery ==
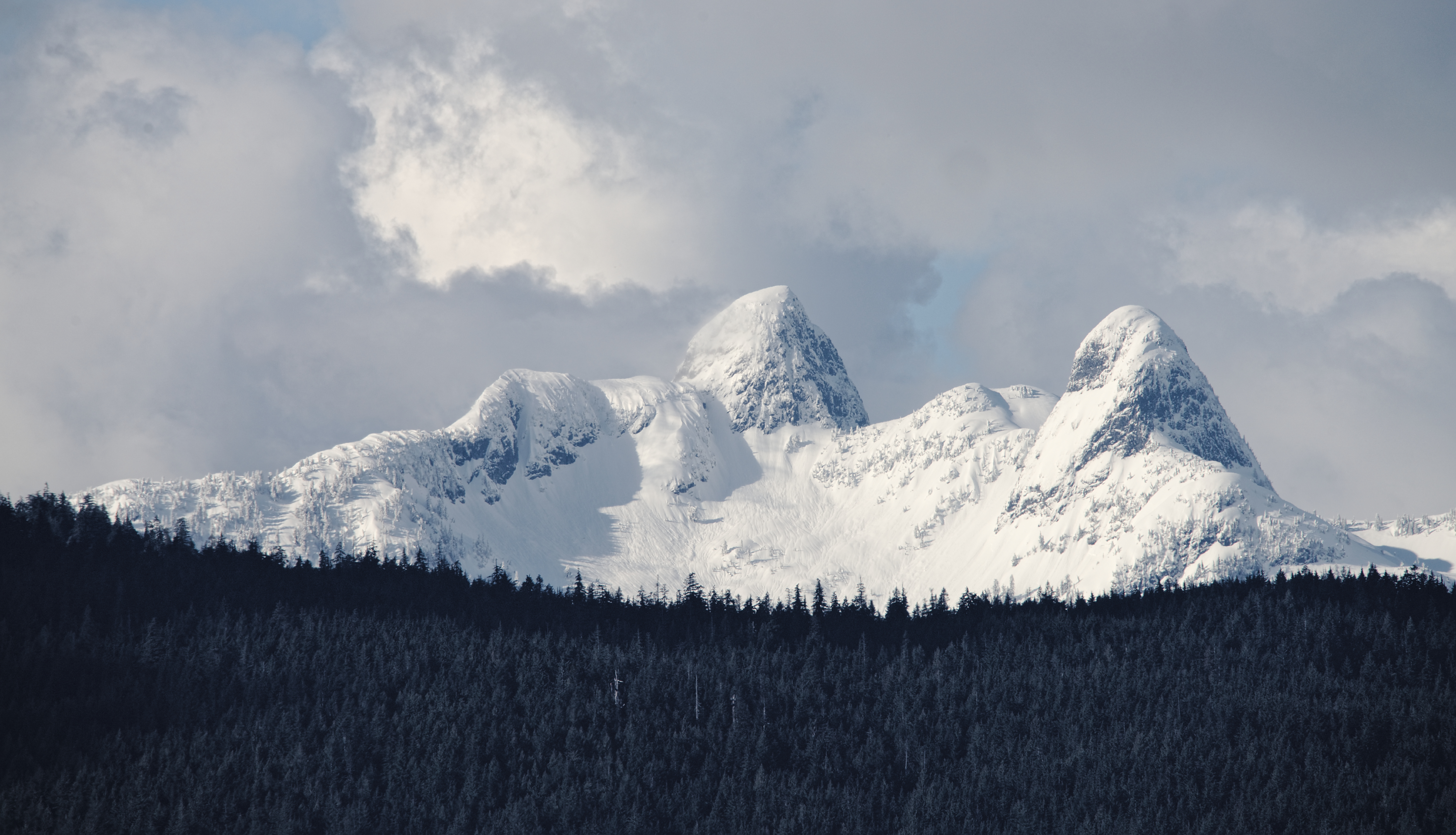
The Lions from North Vancouver through a telephoto lens

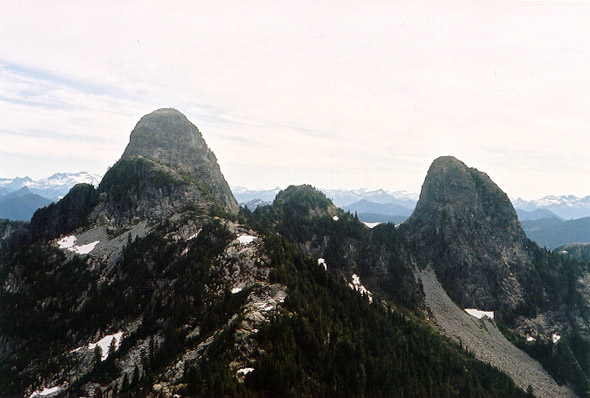
The Lions from nearby Unnecessary Mountain, showing the difference in height between the two peaks

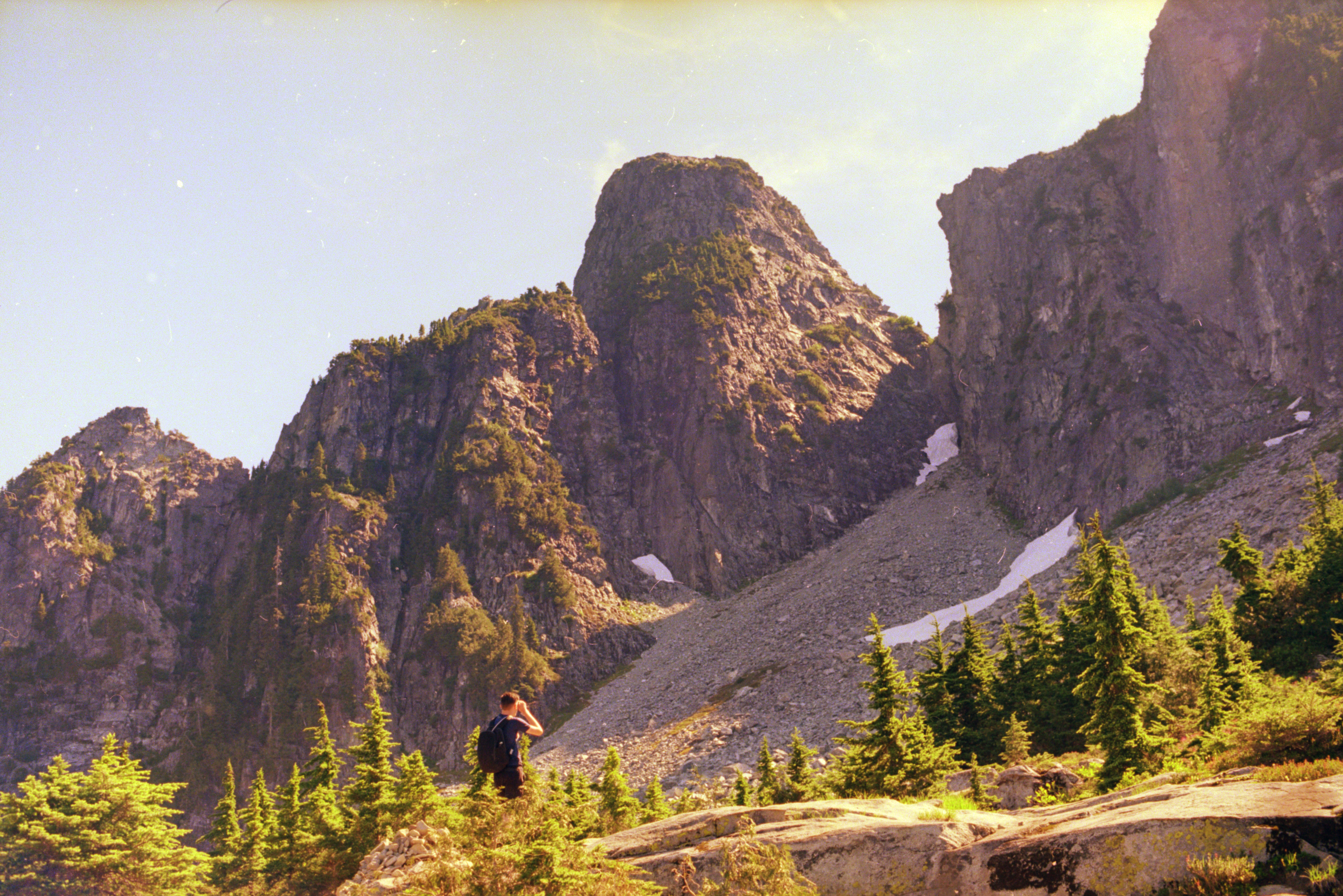
The lions, as seen from behind

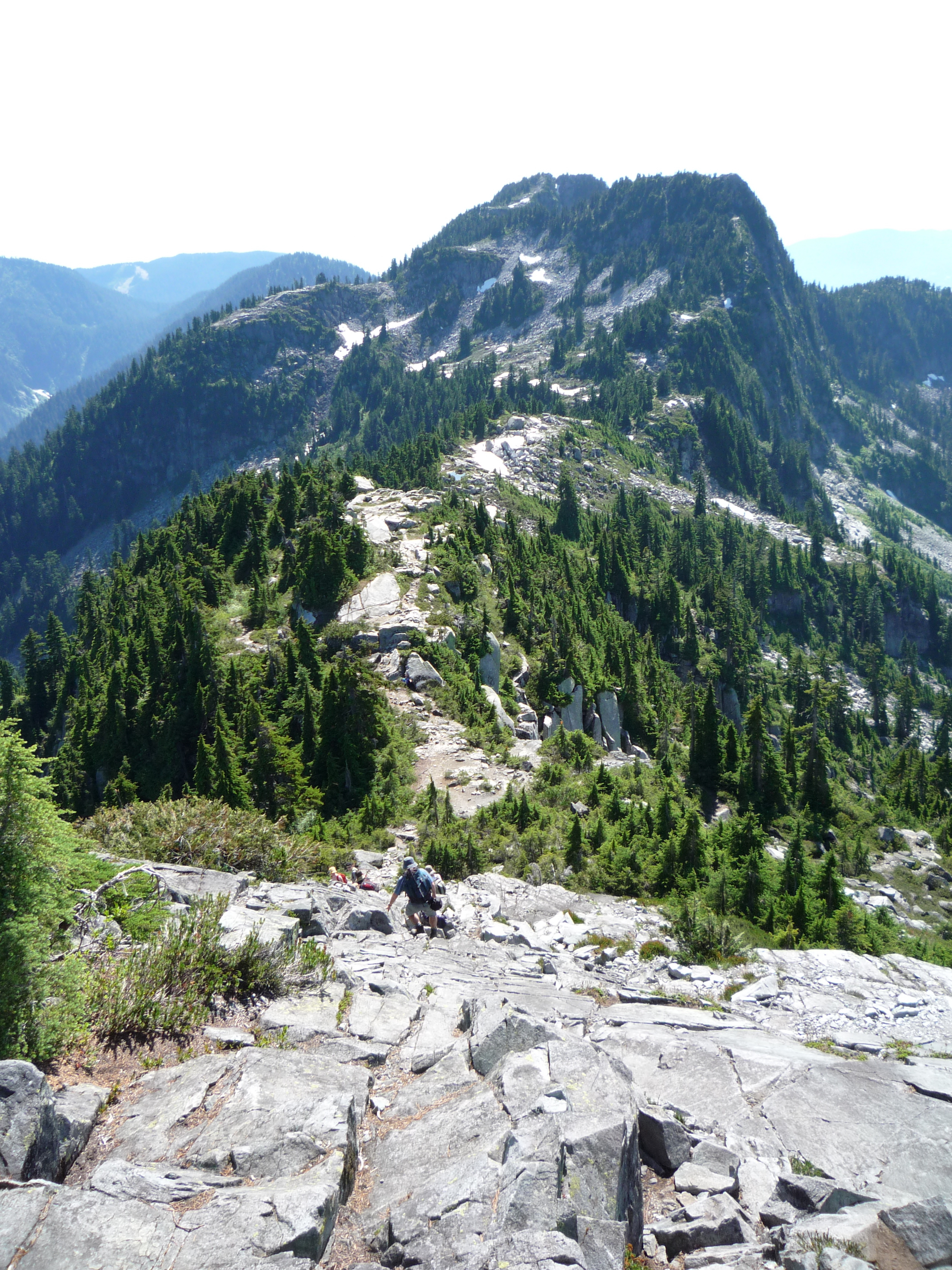
The ridge, or "saddle" leading to the West Lion

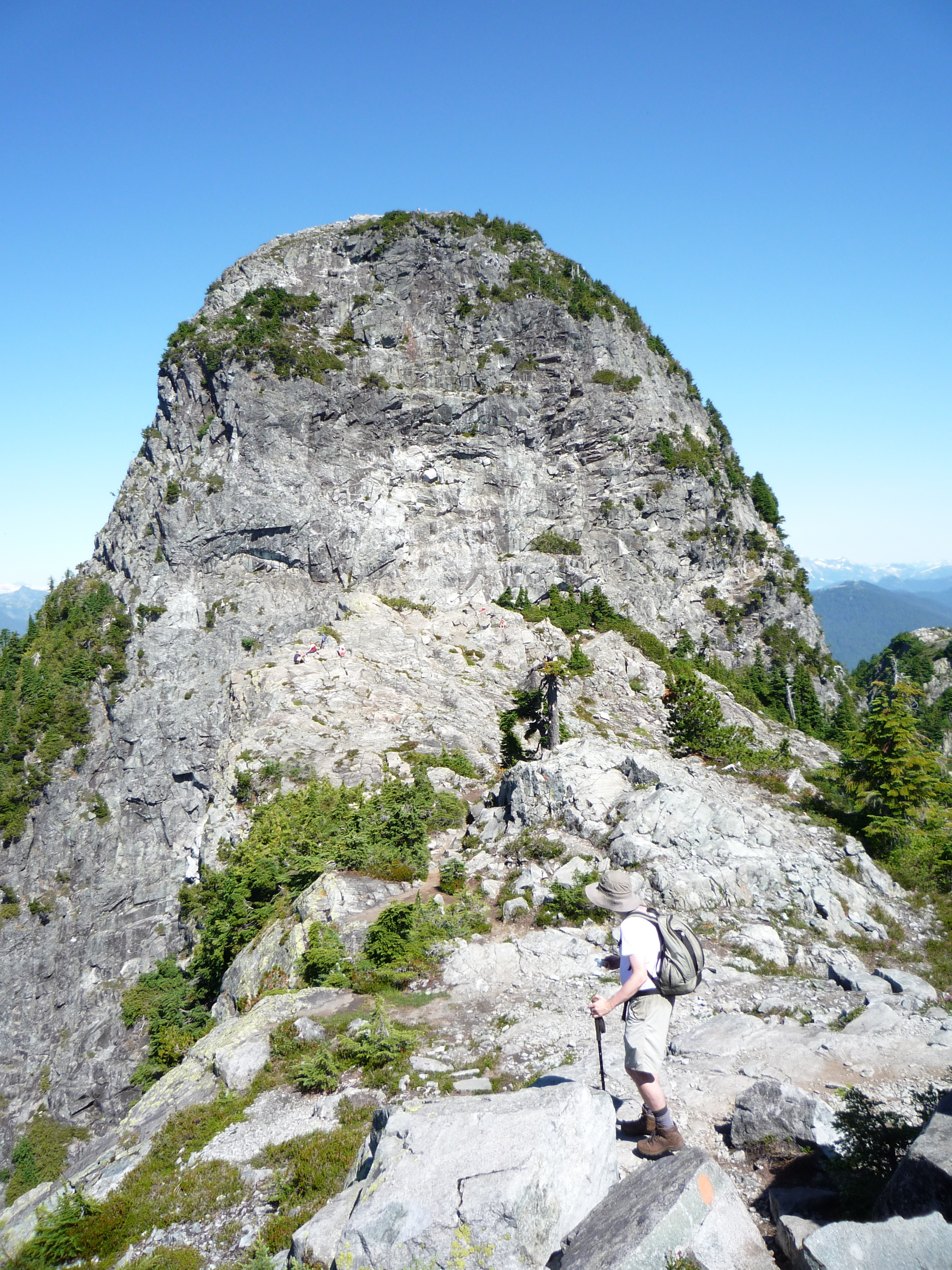
The West Lion, seen from the ridge. Its base is at an elevation of 1525 m.

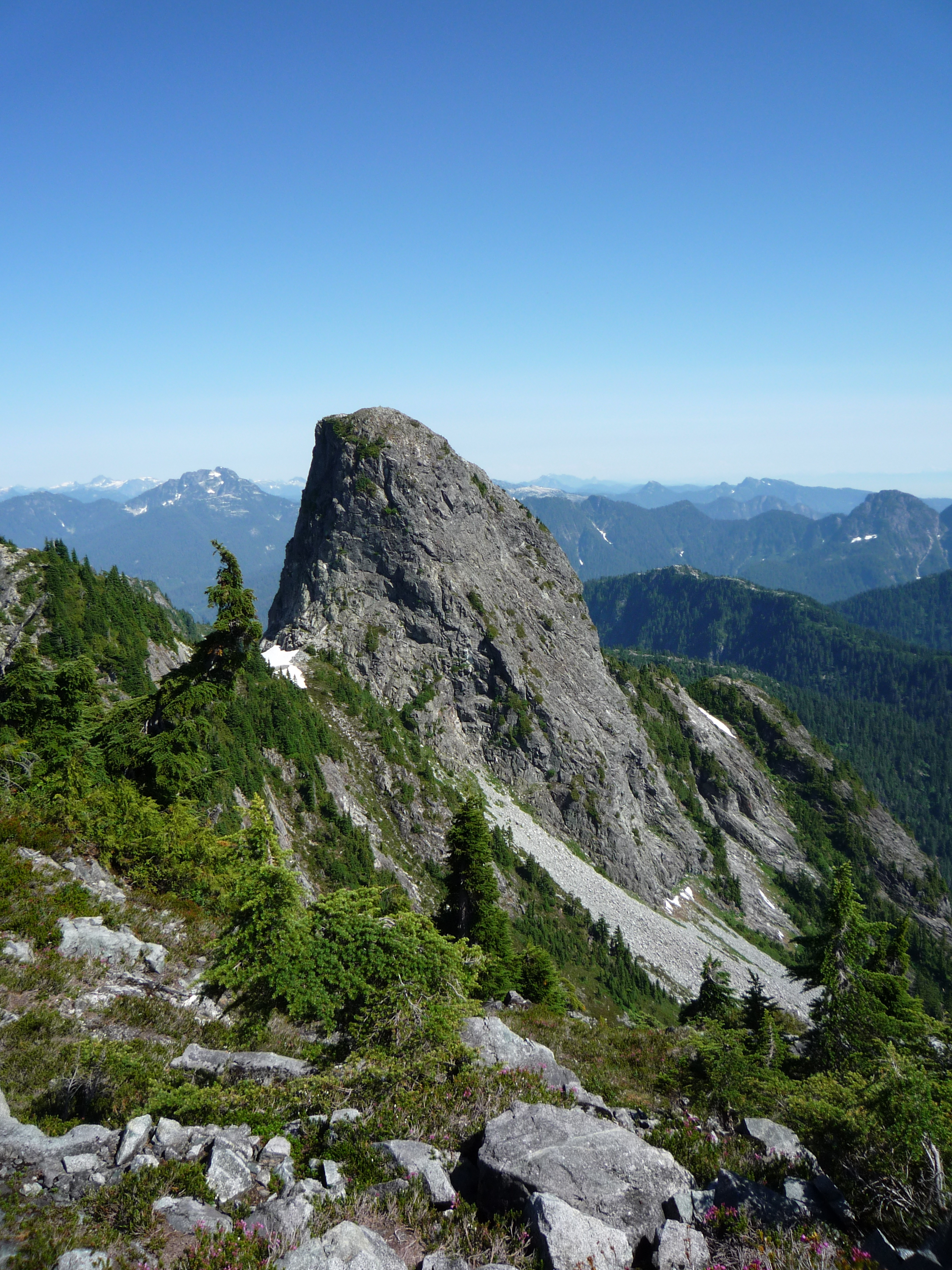
The East Lion, seen from the ridge

View of the Lions from the north, with Vancouver in the background

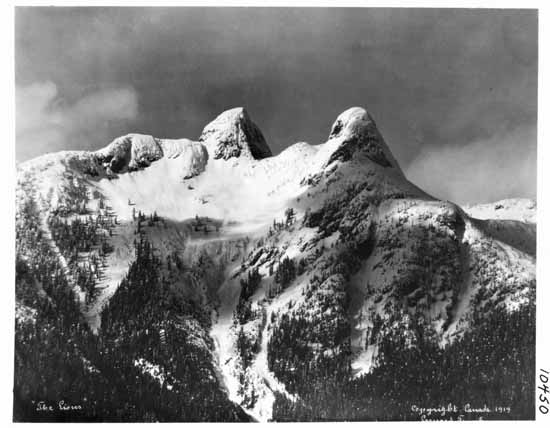
Photographed in 1919 by Leonard Frank
