= Sechelt Peninsula =

Peninsula in Strait of Georgia, British Columbia

Coordinates: 49.5991°N 123.9240°W

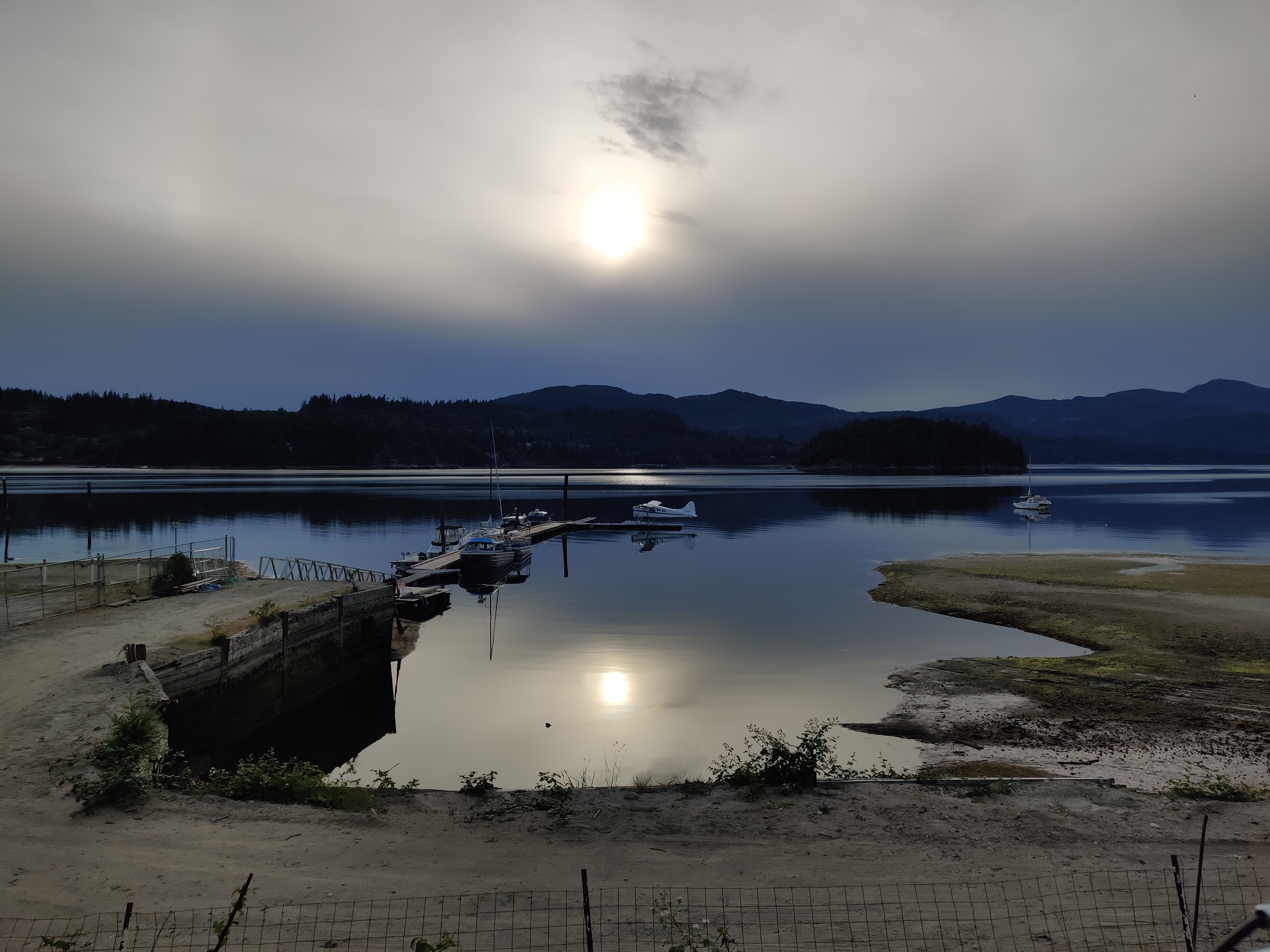
Looking across Sechelt Inlet towards Sechelt Peninsula

The Sechelt Peninsula is located on the Sunshine Coast of British Columbia, just northwest of Vancouver. It is bounded to the west by Malaspina Strait (separating it from Texada Island), to the north by Agamemnon Channel (separating it from Nelson Island) and Jervis Inlet, to the east by Sechelt Inlet (separating it from mainland British Columbia), and to the south by the Strait of Georgia (separating it from Vancouver Island. Its approximately 350 km^{2} is a mixture of drier and wetter temperate rain forest. The Caren Range extends north–south along the shore of Sechelt Inlet. The peninsula is a popular outdoor recreation destination, containing many lakes and opportunities for shoreline and woodland hiking, including to the renowned Skookumchuk Narrows. There are several parks, the largest of which is Spipiyus Provincial Park in the interior of the peninsula.

The population of approximately 28,000 is strung out along Highway 101, which generally traces the southern and western coastline. The major economic activities are tourism and logging.

There is just one incorporated district on the peninsula - Sechelt, located at the isthmus between Sechelt Inlet and the Georgia Strait. Other communities include:

- Earls Cove: Site of the ferry terminal to the upper Sunshine Coast communities of Powell River and Lund.
- Egmont
- Halfmoon Bay
- Madeira Park
- Pender Harbour
- Secret Cove
