= Ambrose Lake (British Columbia) =

Lake in British Columbia, Canada

- Location within British Columbia
- Location: Sunshine Coast Regional District, British Columbia
- Coordinates: 49°43′59″N 124°01′00″W
- Primary outflows: Unnamed creek to Ruby Lake
- Basin countries: Canada
- Max. length: .85 km (0.53 mi)
- Max. width: .55 km (0.34 mi)
- Surface elevation: 57 m (187 ft)

Ambrose Lake is a coastal lake on the Sunshine Coast at the north end of the Sechelt Peninsula in Sunshine Coast Regional District, British Columbia, Canada. It is about 850 metres (2,789 ft) long and 550 metres (1,804 ft) wide, and lies at an elevation of 57 metres (187 ft) about 2.5 kilometres (1.6 mi) southwest of the community of Earls Cove and 450 metres (1,476 ft) east of the Agamemnon Channel. The primary outflow is an unnamed creek to Ruby Lake. The origin of the name is unknown, but was adopted officially on July 28, 1945.

The Ambrose Lake Ecological Reserve encompasses the lake, in part to protect bog landscapes on the northern edge of the lake and along the outlet creek to Ruby Lake, landscapes seldom found elsewhere in southwest British Columbia.

== See also ==
- List of lakes of British Columbia
