= Gibsons & Area Community Centre =

Indoor arena in British Columbia, Canada

Coordinates: 49.4089581°N 123.5225067°W

- Location: 700 Park Rd; Gibsons, British Columbia; V0N 1V0
- Owner: Sunshine Coast Regional District

Construction
- Opened: March 29, 2008
- Construction cost: CA$12.3 million (2008)

Tenants
- Coastal Tsunami (PJHL, BCHC) (2024–present)

The Gibsons & Area Community Centre (GACC) is a community centre in Gibsons, British Columbia. The complex is owned by the Sunshine Coast Regional District and the land is owned by the Town of Gibsons. The community centre features a fitness centre, a basketball court, a multi-purpose room and an ice hockey rink. The ice hockey rink serves as the home of the Coastal Tsunami of the British Columbia Hockey Conference.

== History ==
The Gibsons & Area Community Centre was built at a cost of CA$12.3 million and completed in time for its opening on March 29, 2008.

== Facilities ==
The Gibsons & Area Community Centre is a complex with multiple facilities including: a half-court basketball court, a fitness centre, a multi-purpose room, racquetball courts and an NHL-size hockey rink.

== Hockey rink ==
The hockey rink at the Gibsons & Area Community Centre is NHL-size (200 feet x 85 feet) and has six dressing rooms. The rink is maintained by a zero-emissions Zamboni ice resurfacer. The GACC rink is home to the Sunshine Coast Junior Hockey Society. It often hosts crowds exceeding 700 people for Coastal Tsunami games.

=== Scoreboard ===
In 2023, the Pacific National Exhibition (PNE) donated the video display score clock from the Pacific Coliseum in Vancouver to the Sunshine Coast Junior Hockey Society to be the score clock for the GACC rink. The scoreboard was installed at the Pacific Coliseum in preparation for the 2010 Winter Olympics. The scoreboard was key in the community's efforts to attract a Pacific Junior Hockey League team to Gibsons.

=== Coastal Tsunami ===
On August 1, 2023, the Pacific Junior Hockey League (PJHL) announced that the league would expand to the Sunshine Coast with a team playing at the Gibsons & Area Community Centre. The Coastal Tsunami played its first home game at the GACC on September 14, 2024. In April 2026 it was announced that the Tsunami would be moving to the new Junior A British Columbia Hockey Conference.
