= Ambrose Lake =

Ambrose Lake may refer to several places in Canada:

- Ambrose Lake (British Columbia)
- Ambrose Lake (Algoma District)
- Ambrose Lake (Thunder Bay District, Ontario)
