= Skookumchuck Narrows Provincial Park =

Provincial park in British Columbia, Canada

- IUCN category III (natural monument or feature)
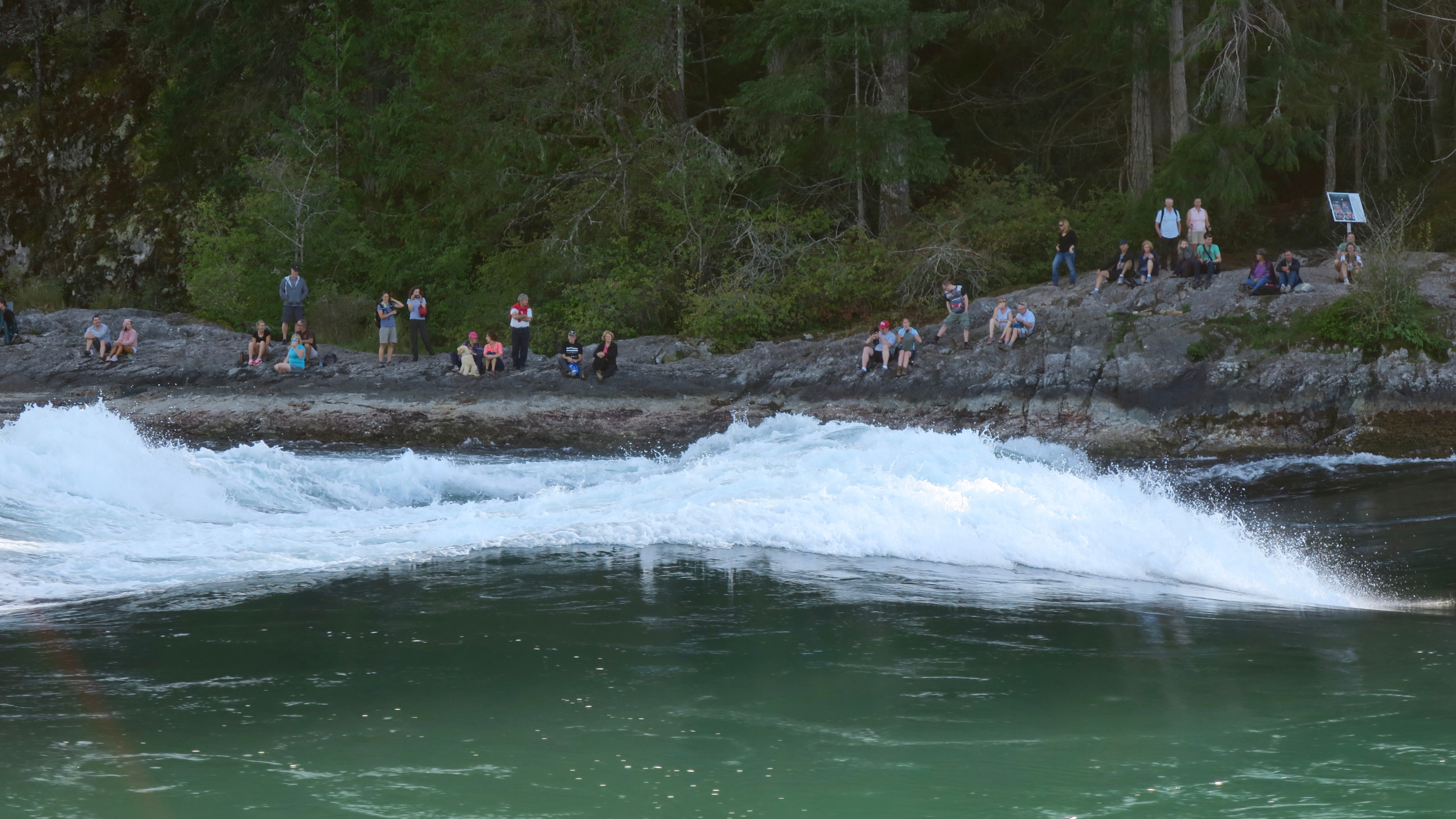
- Visitors observe the Sechelt Rapids at Skookumchuck Narrows

- Location within British Columbia
- Interactive map of Skookumchuck Narrows Provincial Park
- Location: Sunshine Coast RD, British Columbia, Canada
- Nearest town: Earls Cove
- Coordinates: 49°44′19″N 123°54′29″W
- Area: 123 ha (300 acres)
- Established: August 25, 1957
- Governing body: BC Parks

Skookumchuck Narrows Provincial Park is a provincial park in the Sunshine Coast of British Columbia, Canada. It was established on August 25, 1957, to protect the Sechelt Rapids located in the Skookumchuck Narrows between Sechelt Inlet and Jervis Inlet.
