= British Columbia Highway 101 =

Highway in British Columbia

Highway 101
- Sunshine Coast Highway
- Highway 101 highlighted in red.

Route information
- Maintained by the Ministry of Transportation and Infrastructure
- Length: 156 km (97 mi)
- Existed: 1962–present

Major junctions
- South end: Langdale ferry terminal
- Earls Cove–Saltery Bay ferry
- North end: Lund

Location
- Country: Canada
- Province: British Columbia
- Regional districts: Sunshine Coast, qathet
- Major cities: Powell River
- Towns: Gibsons

Highway system
- British Columbia provincial highways
← Highway 99	→ Highway 113

British Columbia Highway 101, also known as the Sunshine Coast Highway, is a 156-kilometre (97 mi) long highway that is the main north–south thoroughfare on the Sunshine Coast in British Columbia, Canada.

Highway 101, which first opened in 1962, is divided into two separate land segments, with a ferry link in between. The highway is maintained by Capilano Highway Services. Despite its location on the mainland, the highway is unique for not being connected to the rest of the British Columbia highway system. Access to the highway can only be obtained by taking ferries from Horseshoe Bay to the south end in Gibsons or Comox to Powell River. Highway 101 between Langdale and Powell River is designated as a feeder route of the Canadian National Highway System. The highway is sometimes considered by locals to be an extension of the much more famous U.S. Route 101 that runs all the way to Los Angeles, however there is a 300 km gap between the two highways and the origin of the BC-101's number may not be related to US 101.

== Route description ==
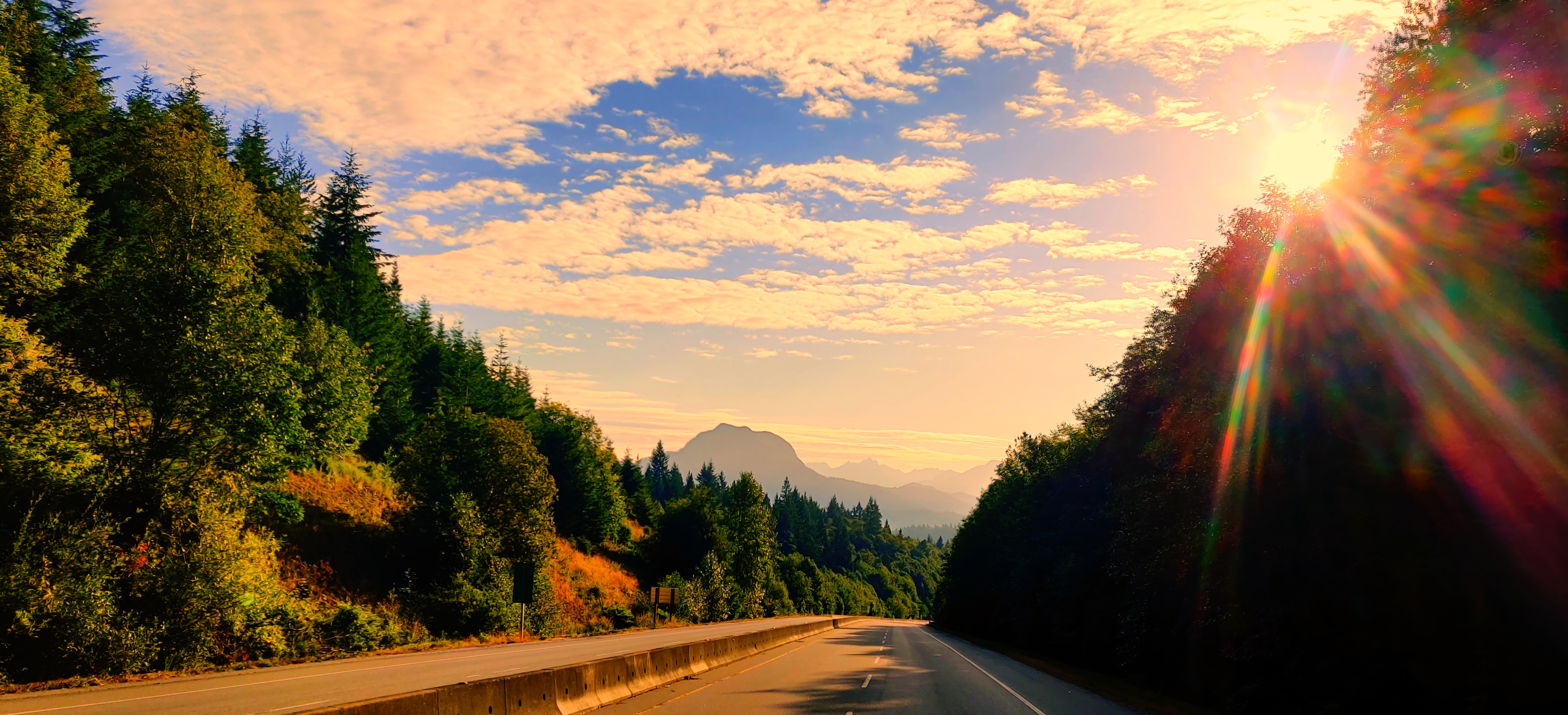
Highway 101 on the Gibsons Bypass.

The total distance of Highway 101, including the ferry link, is approximately 156 kilometres (97 mi). The vast majority of the highway is an exceptionally curvy undivided 2 lane route with few passing opportunities. In general the highway experiences low traffic volumes due to its rural nature and lack of connection to other highways. However much of Highway 101s daily traffic comes in waves timed to when the ferries arrives as a large amount of vehicle suddenly unload onto the highway. The speed limit on the Highway is 80–60 km/h in rural areas and 50 km/h in towns.

=== South Section ===
The highway begins in the south at the BC Ferries terminal at Langdale, which connects the Sunshine Coast to Vancouver via a ferry route across Howe Sound to Horseshoe Bay. The southern land section of Highway 101 is 80 kilometres (50 mi) long. Immediately after leaving the Langdale Ferry terminal Highway 101 follows the Gibson's Bypass, a two-kilometre (1.2 mi) long stretch of 4 lane divided highway that forms the only improved section of Highway 101. The Gibsons Bypass was built in 1995 and was originally intended to entirely bypass the town of Gibsons but the bypass currently abruptly terminates at a T intersection where Highway 101 traffic is forced to turn left onto a 2 lane route though the narrow streets and many signal lights of Gibsons's small commercial area. After leaving Gibsons the highway travels a busy 2 lane route for 20 kilometres (12 mi) though Roberts Creek, until arriving in the Sechelt, the only other major municipality in the area. In Sechelt the highway travels on a 4 lane Main Street before turning onto several other smaller community roads. North of Sechelt traffic on the highway thins out dramatically. For the next 60 kilometres (37 mi) to the Earls Cove Ferry Terminal the highway curves though granite outcrops, past lakes and patches of rainforest mixed with small farms. Towns along the way include Halfmoon Bay and Pender Harbour and many smaller hamlets located on the ocean. Near the ferry terminal a small paved side road branches off to Skookumchuck Narrows. The ferry link across the Jervis Inlet lasts 9.5 nautical miles (17.6 km) between Earls Cove to the south and Saltery Bay to the north.

=== North Section ===
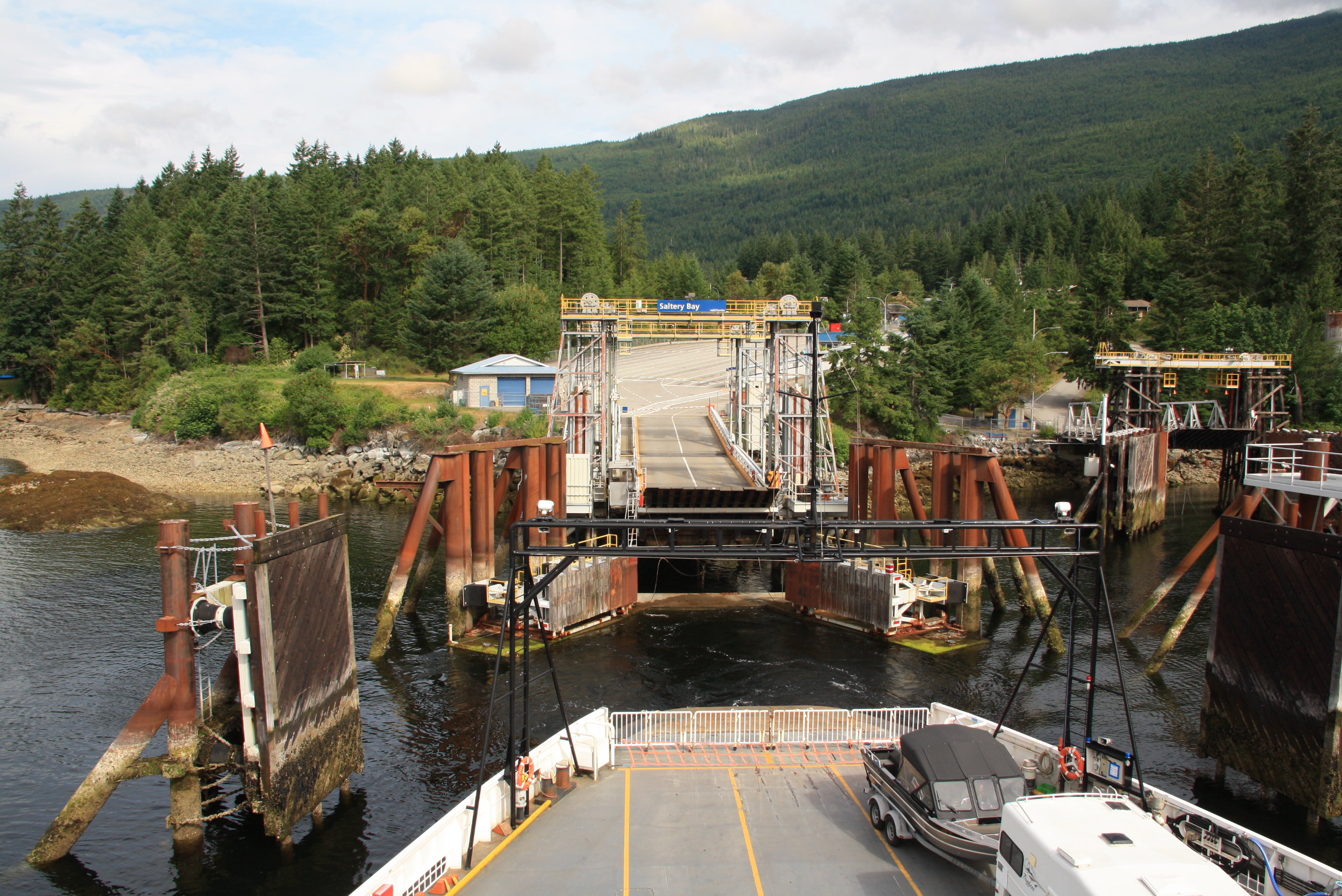
Ferry Terminal on Highway 101 at Saltery Bay

The 59-kilometre-long (37 mi) northern land section of Highway 101 curves its way along the Malaspina Strait through the hamlets of Stillwater and Lang Bay. It then enters the small city of Powell River forming its main street. It then crosses a narrow bridge over Powell Lake and soon enters the Tla'amin Nation Reservation. From there the highway downgrades to nothing more than a small rural road for the last 15 kilometres (9.3 mi) to the community of Lund, where the highway ends at a boat ramp and dock for the Savary Island water taxi.

== Fixed link proposals ==
The provincial government has conducted several feasibility studies on connecting Highway 101 to the Lower Mainland, as well as replacing the Earls Cove–Saltery Bay ferry. A study launched by the BC Liberal government in 2015 identified four proposals costing between $2.1 billion and $4.4 billion:

- A 58-kilometre (36 mi) extension of Highway 101 along the west shore of Howe Sound that would connect to Highway 99 near Squamish.
- A 22-kilometre (14 mi) extension of Highway 101 across Howe Sound on a pair of suspension bridges via Anvil Island, with a connection to Highway 99 near Lions Bay. The Islands Trust opposes this option.
- A new 200-kilometre (120 mi) highway connecting Powell River to Squamish with a pair of tunnels under the Coast Mountains.
- A 19-kilometre (12 mi) highway link between the two sections of Highway 101 eliminating the ferry between Saltery Bay and Earls Cove via a pair of suspension bridges.

All four options were considered feasible, with positive cost to benefit ratios for the two bridge options. The study was inconclusive and recommended further analysis of the four options. The NDP government announced in December 2017 that the study would not move forward due to technical and financial issues.

== Major intersections ==
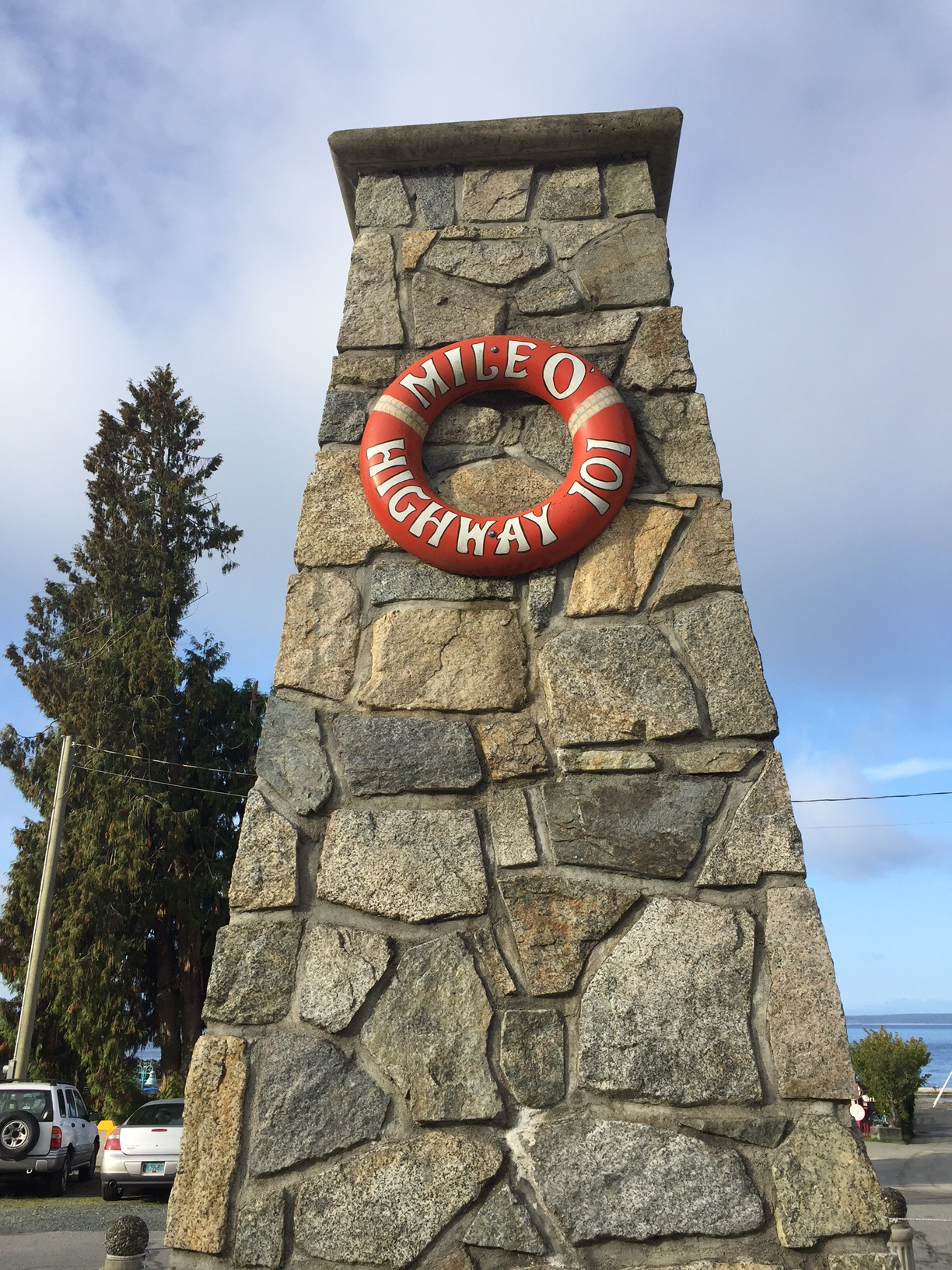
Milestone marker in Lund designating a terminus of the highway.

Regional District	Location	km	mi	Destinations	Notes
Howe Sound				Highway 1 (TCH) east to Highway 99 – Vancouver	Continuation from Horseshoe Bay ferry terminal
Howe Sound				BC Ferries from Langdale to Horseshoe Bay	
Sunshine Coast	Langdale	0.00	0.00	Langdale ferry terminal	Highway 101 southern terminus
Sunshine Coast	Langdale	0.93	0.58	Marine Drive (Highway 901:2563 south) / Port Mellon Highway (Highway 901:2560 north) – Gibsons Landing, Port Mellon	
Sunshine Coast	Gibsons	4.89	3.04	Gibsons Way / School Road	To Highway 901:2563 north
Sunshine Coast	Sechelt	26.26	16.32	Dolphin Street / Wharf Avenue	
Sunshine Coast	Madeira Park	58.09	36.10	Madeira Park Road (Highway 901:2574 north)	
Sunshine Coast	Earls Cove	80.29	49.89	Earls Cove ferry terminal	
Jervis Inlet				Earls Cove – Saltery Bay Ferry; Approximately 17.6 km (9.5 nmi)	
qathet	Saltery Bay	97.89	60.83	Saltery Bay ferry terminal	
qathet	Powell River	128.67	79.95	Wharf Street (Highway 901:2576 west) / Westview Avenue – Ferries	BC Ferries to Texada Island and Comox/Courtenay
qathet	Lund	156.36	97.16	Lund Wharf / Lund Water Taxi	Highway 101 northern terminus; passenger Ferry to Savary Island
1.000 mi = 1.609 km; 1.000 km = 0.621 mi: Tolled
