= Smuggler Cove Marine Provincial Park =

Provincial park of British Columbia, Canada

- IUCN category II (national park)
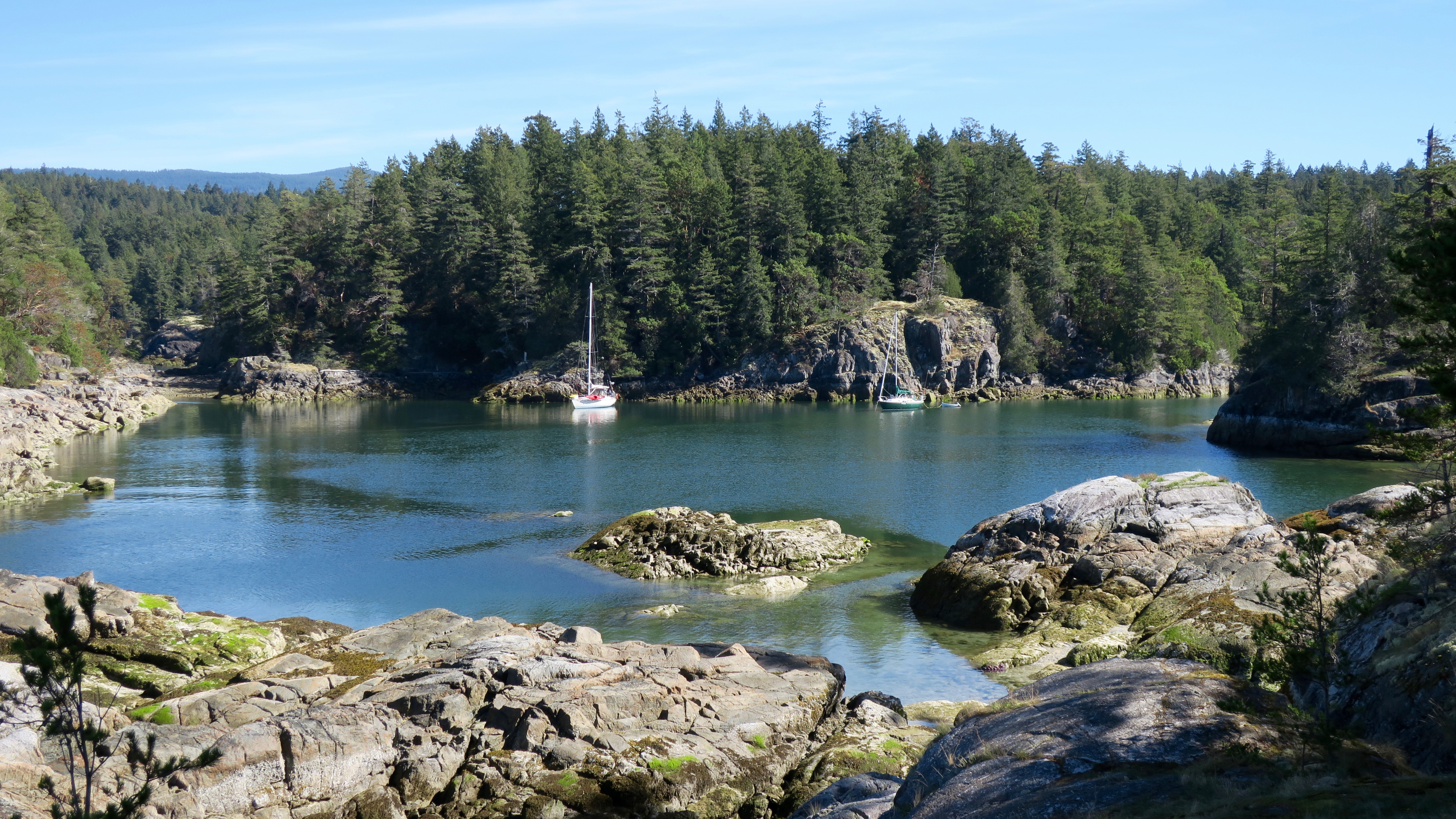
- Panoramic view

- Location within British Columbia
- Interactive map of Smuggler Cove Marine Provincial Park
- Location: British Columbia, Canada
- Nearest city: Sechelt
- Coordinates: 49°30′58″N 123°57′27″W
- Area: 1.85 km^{2} (0.71 sq mi)
- Established: July 26, 1971
- Governing body: BC Parks

Smuggler Cove Marine Provincial Park is a provincial park in British Columbia, Canada located approximately 16 kilometres (9.9 mi) west of Sechelt, a city on the Sunshine Coast. Smuggler Cove is a small, picturesque all-weather anchorage on the south side of Sechelt Peninsula near Secret Cove. The park has options for hiking, swimming, kayaking and picnicking. There is no campsites available in the park.

The park draws many boaters and sightseers every year to the protected cove. Many come to explore the many bays of the area, rock cliffs and beach areas. The marine park is considered a wetland park so there are some very sensitive ecological areas along the path designed to protect the ecosystem.

== Access ==
Smuggler Cove Park can be accessed by a 4 kilometres (2.5 mi) hike that starts in a parking lot off British Columbia Highway 101.

The park is accessible by boat from the north end of Welcome Pass. When accessing the cove by boat, timing entry with low tide is recommended in order to avoid protruding reefs and submerged rocks. There are numerous eye bolts along the shoreline for stern pins. Boats that are visiting are required by law to keep sewage contained, as Smuggler Cove is a protected area.

== History ==
A possible apocryphal story is that Smuggler Cove owes its name to its reported use by Larry Kelly. Kelly, the “King of the Smugglers”, who was also known as “Pirate”, came up to Canada after fighting for the Confederates in the American Civil War. When the Canadian Pacific Railway was completed, many unemployed Chinese workers tried to emigrate to the United States but were forbidden official entry. Kelly assisted the Chinese to cross the border for a fee of $100 each.

His insurance against detection was to have the Chinese agree to be roped together and tied to a large hunk of pig iron. If there was a chance that they would be apprehended by U.S. customs, he would throw the iron and Chinese overboard. There is a common misconception is that Larry Kelly was also nicknamed "Pig Iron", but this was another smuggler by the name of Jim Kelly.

Another story is that the cove was used to smuggle liquor into the United States during the Prohibition in the 1920s. The liquor smuggled would be from the nearby Texada Island.

== Gallery ==
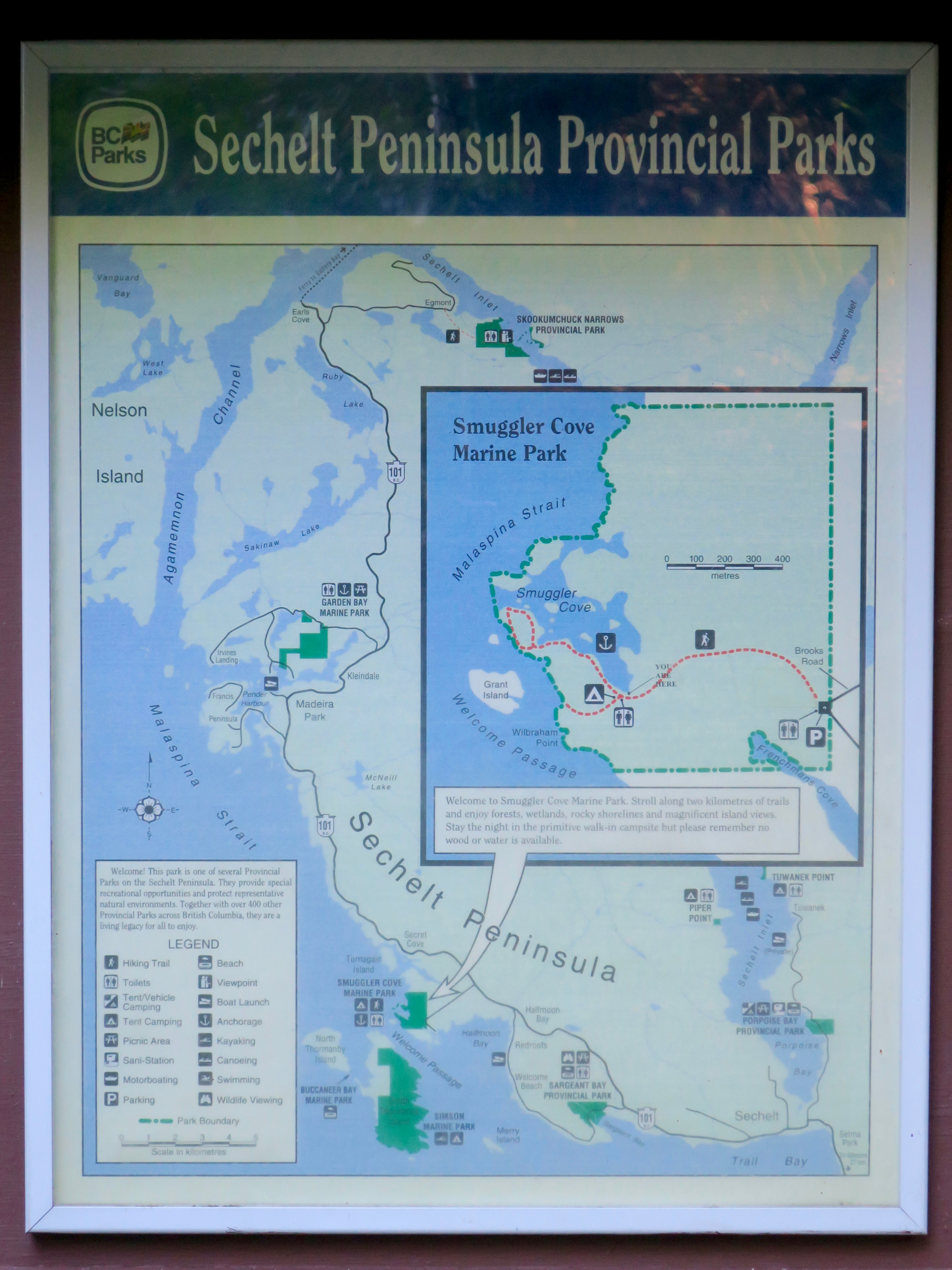
Park sign

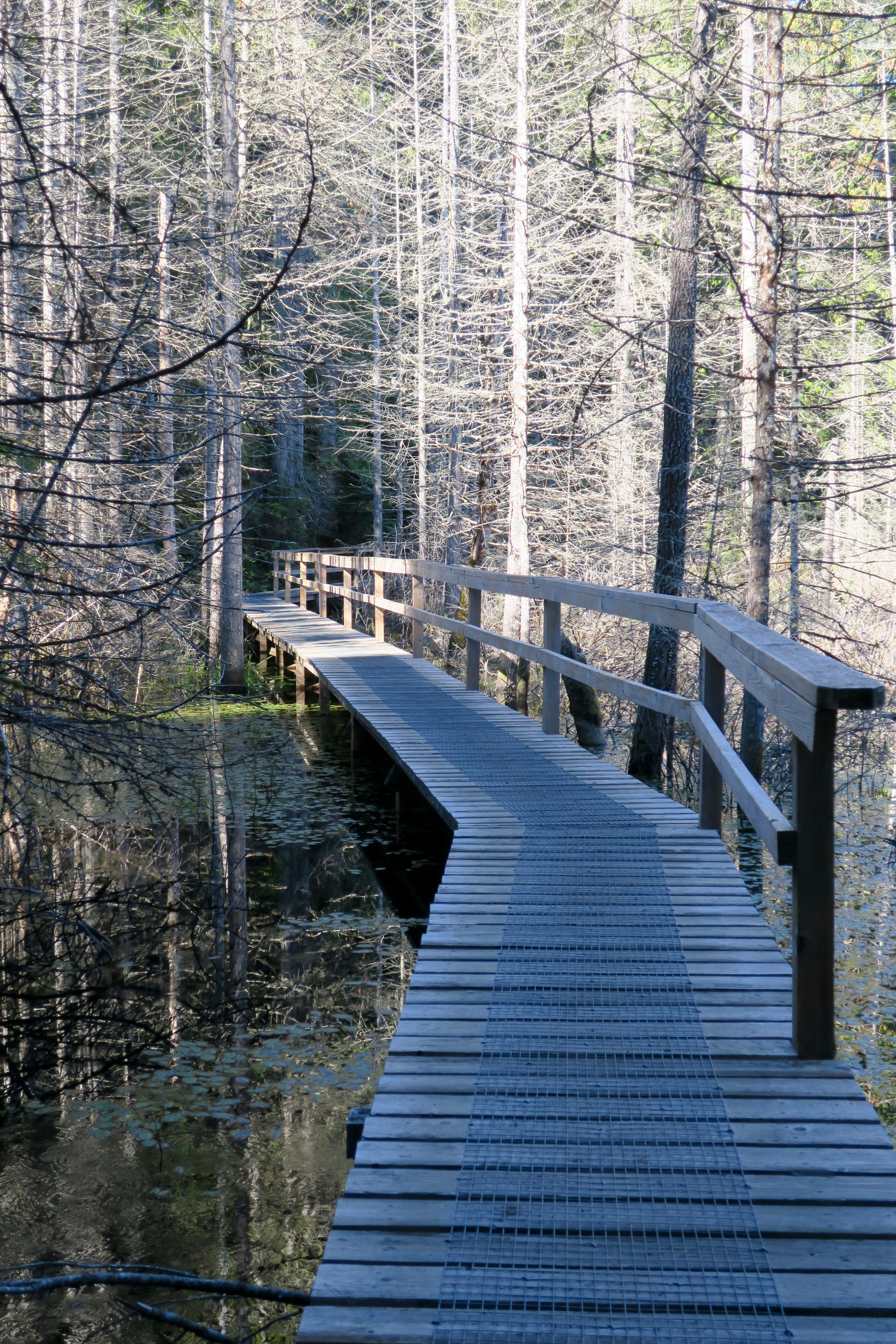
Boardwalk in the park

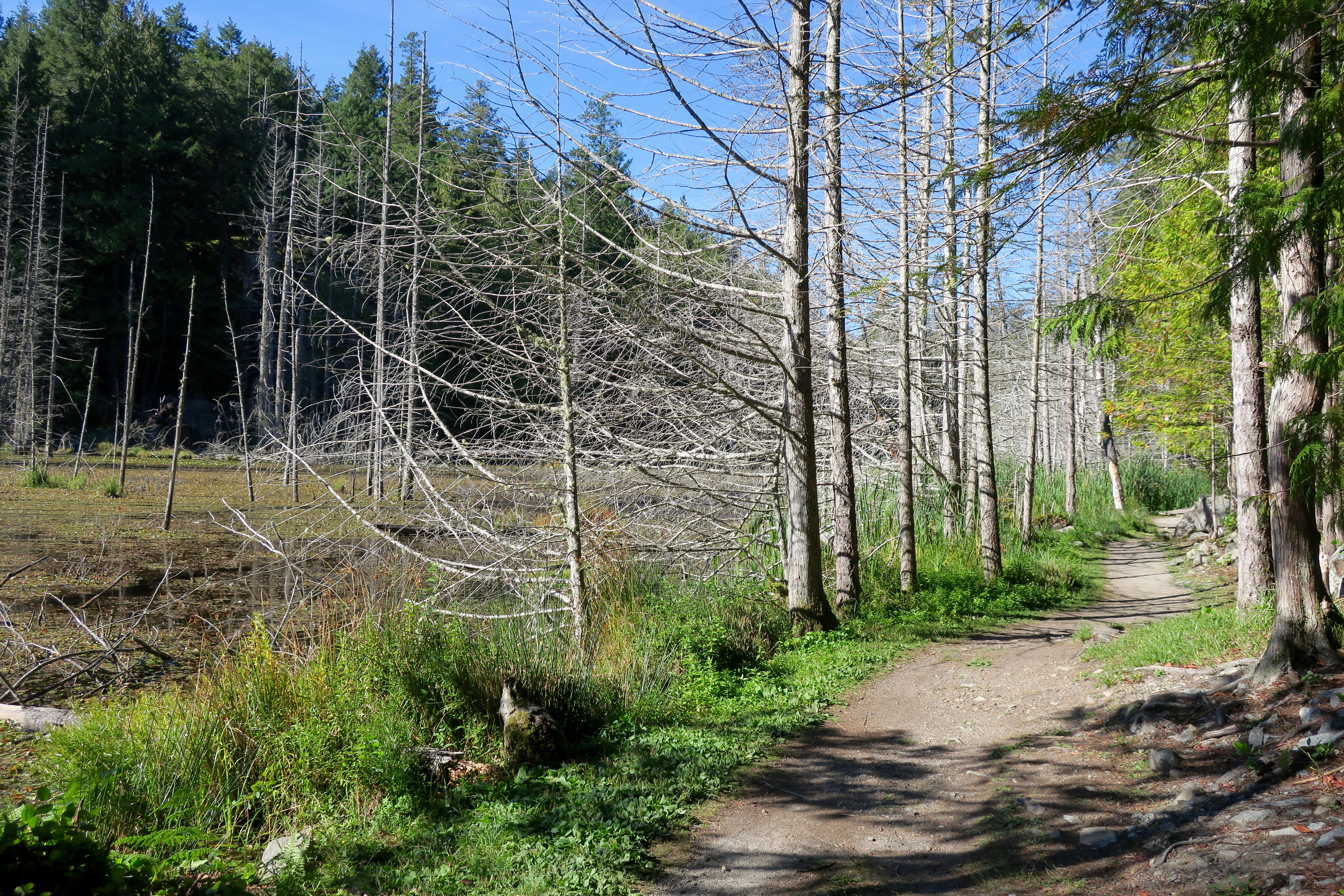
Trail in the park

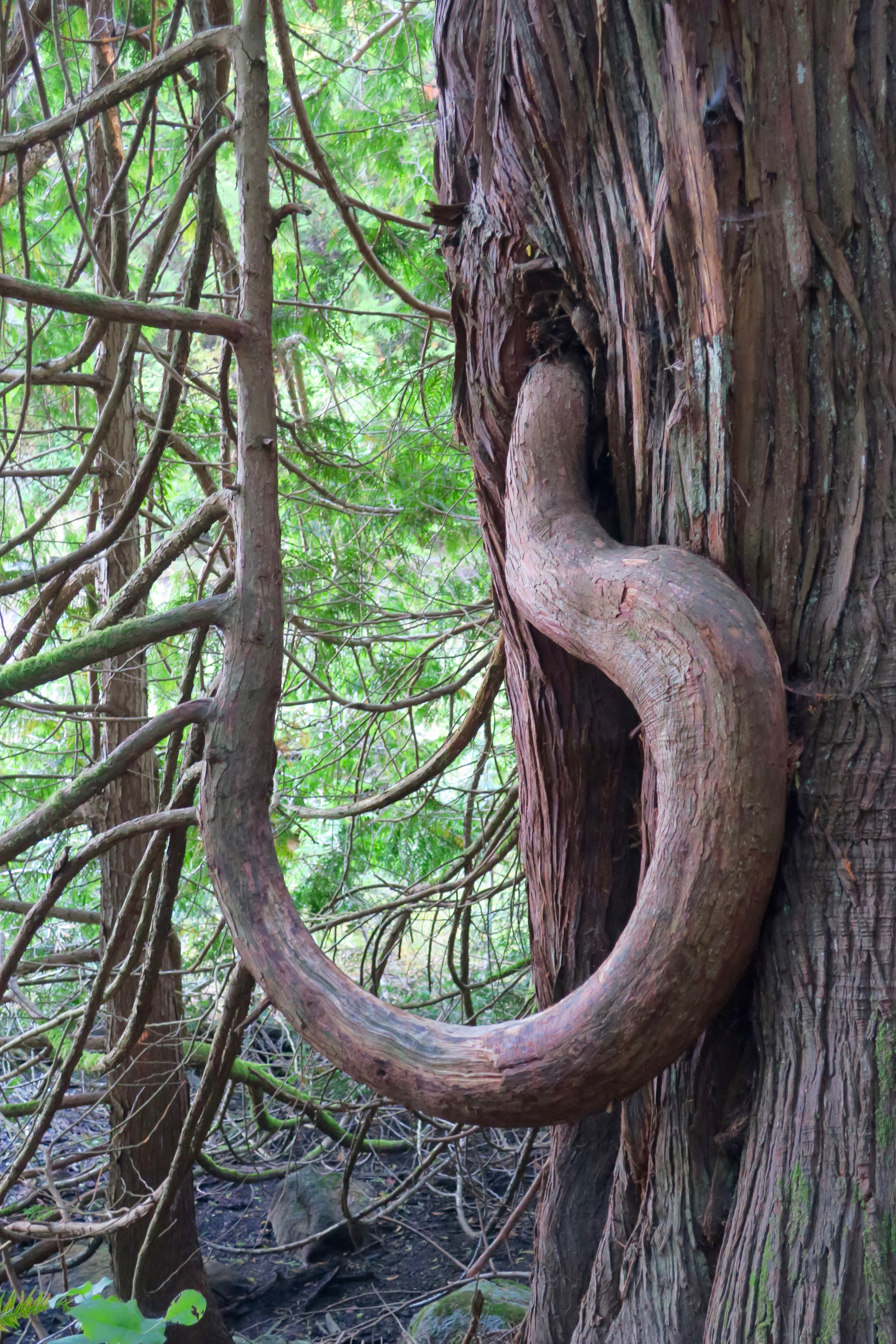
An interesting branch of a cedar tree

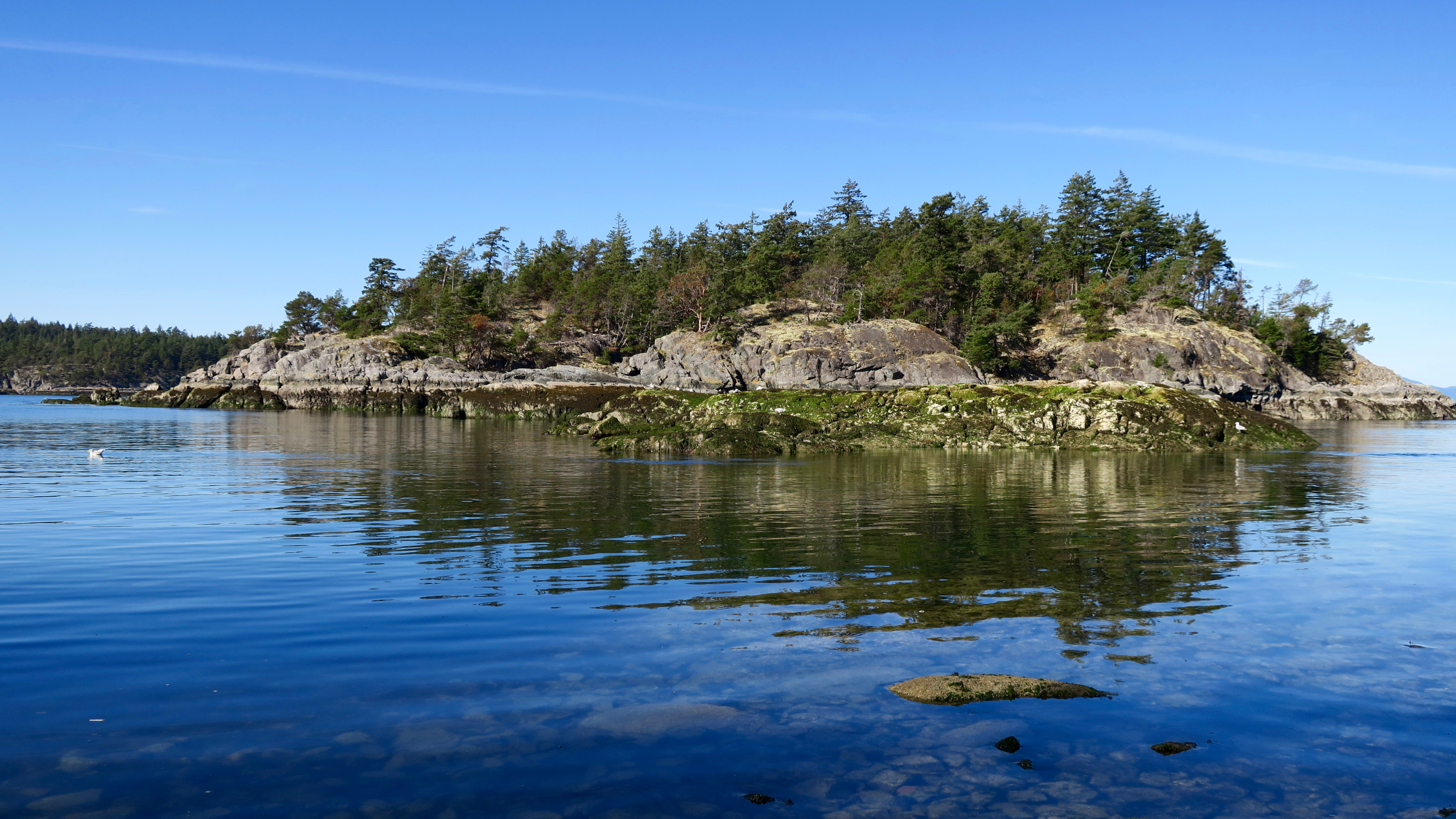
A view of the park from the water

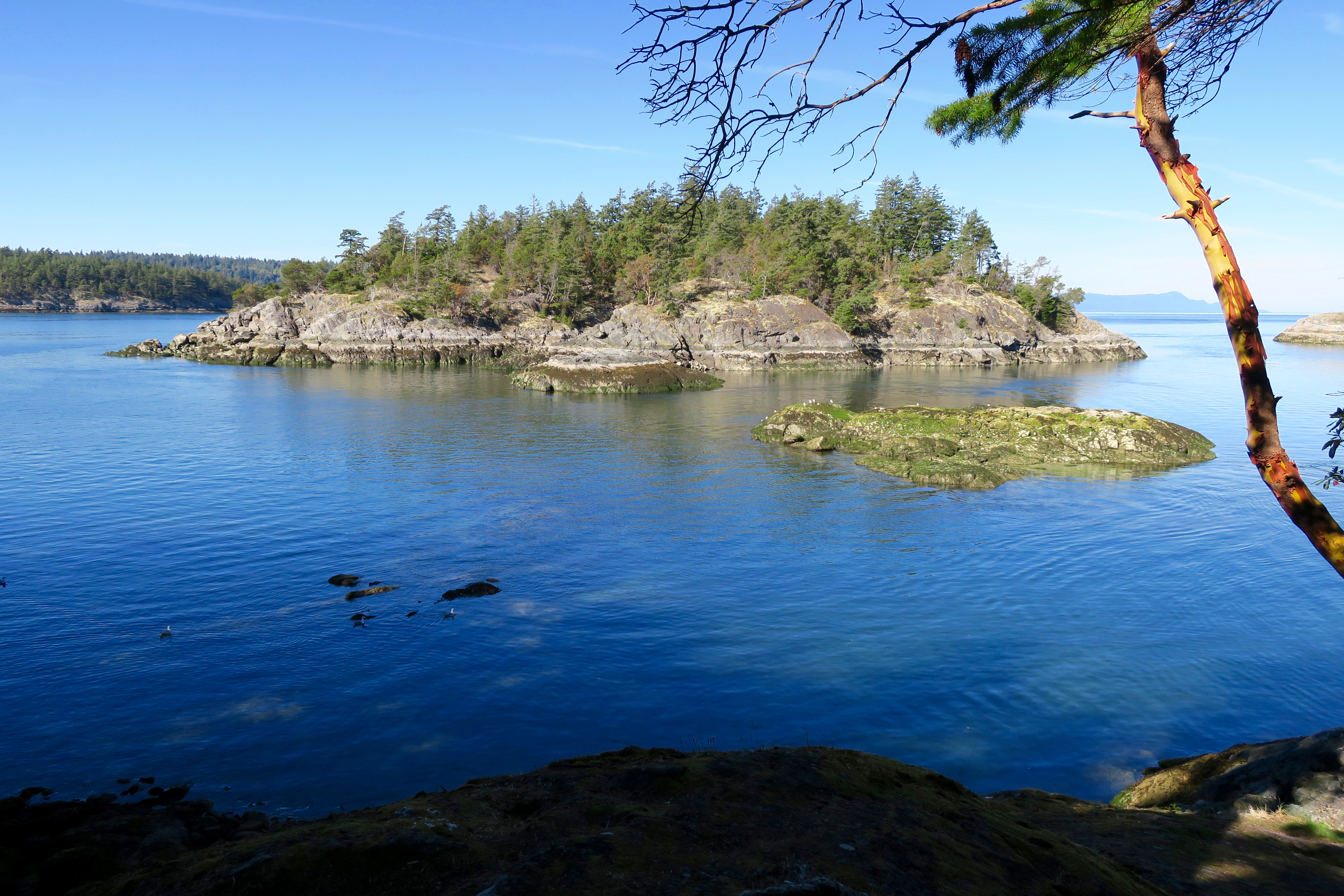
A view of beach, rocks and island in the park

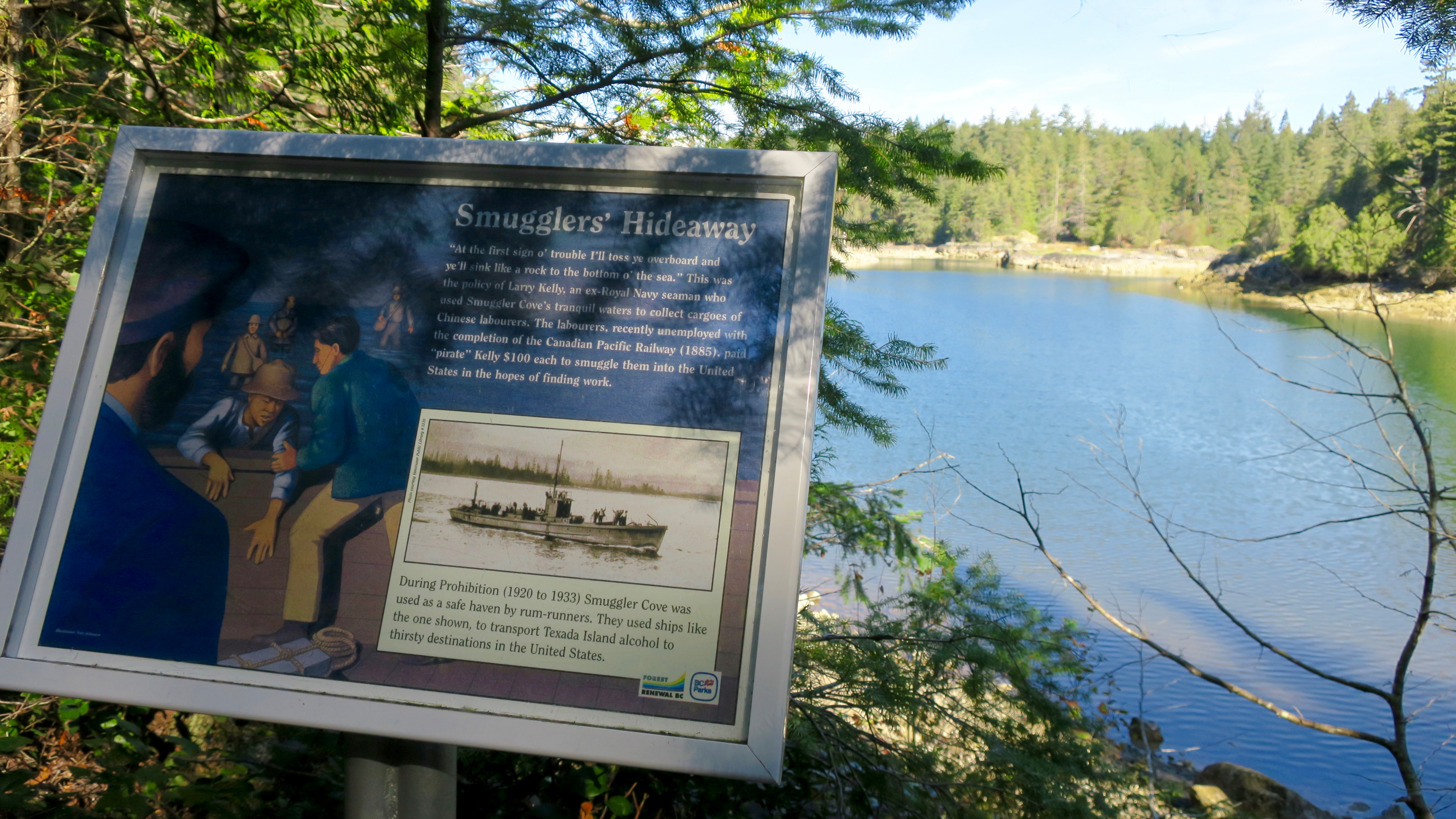
An interpretive sign about the park history

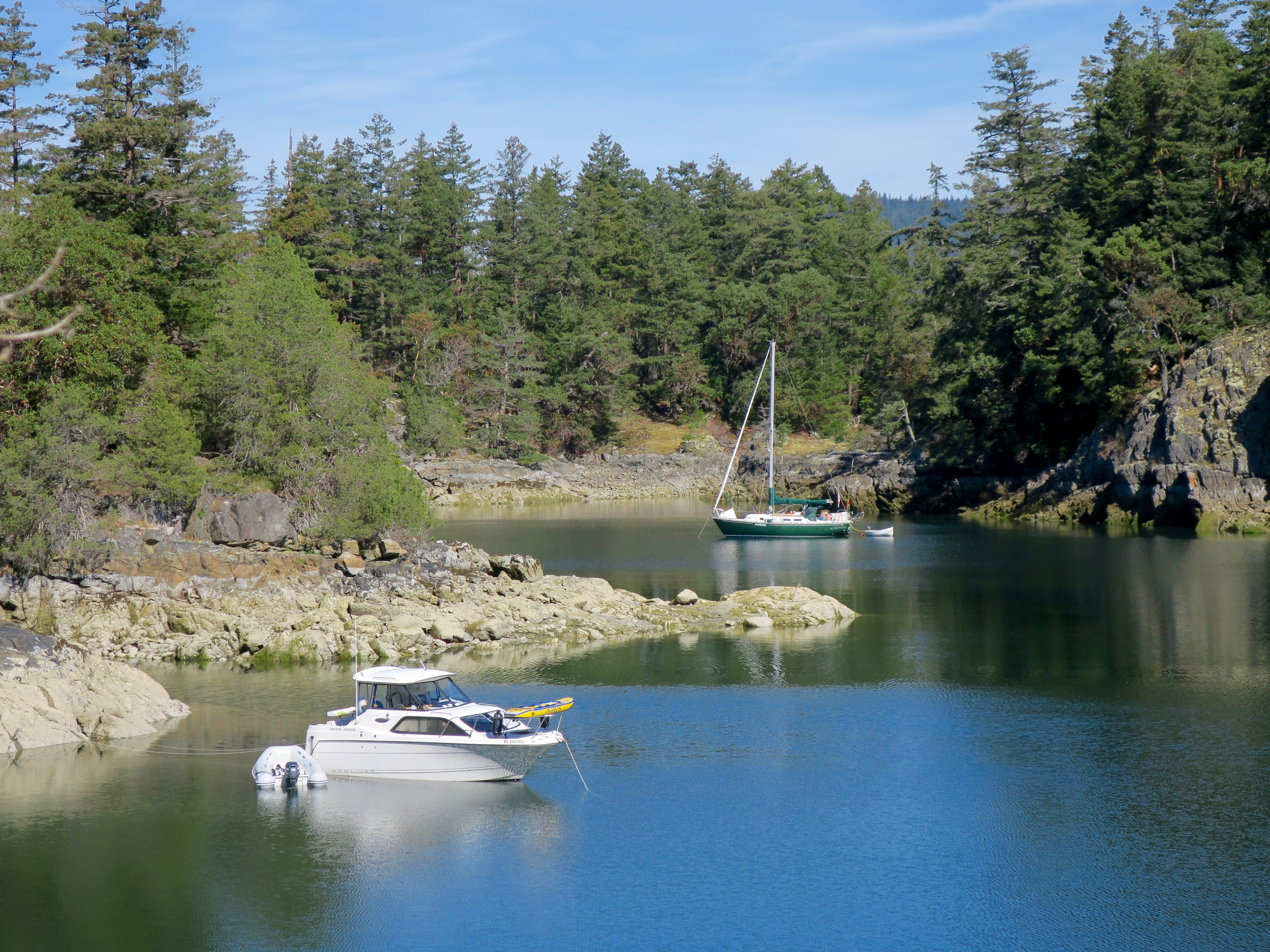
Boats at anchor in the park

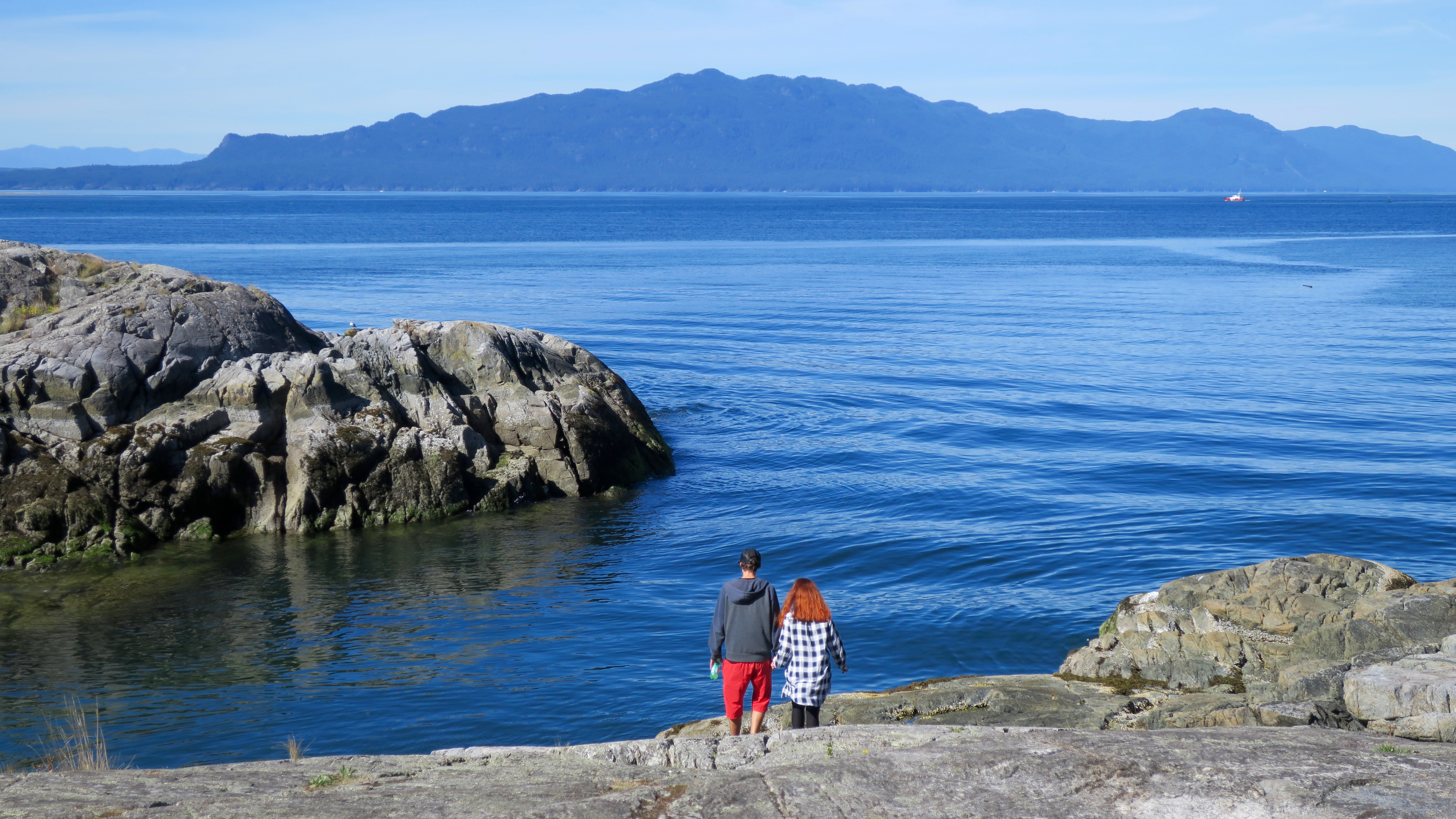
A couple on a rocky beach

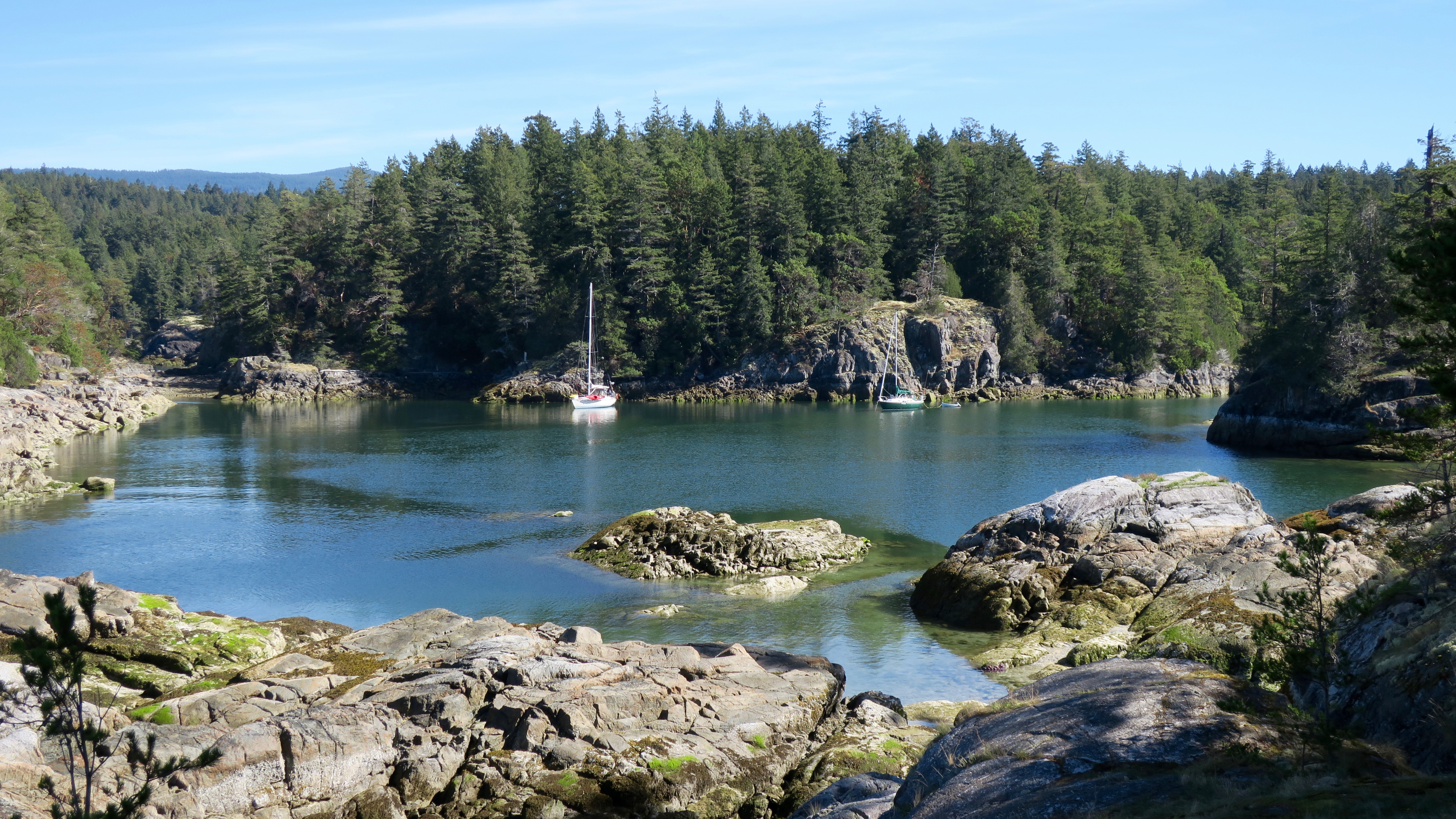
A view of a cove in the park
