= Langdale ferry terminal =

Ferry terminal in British Columbia, Canada

Langdale
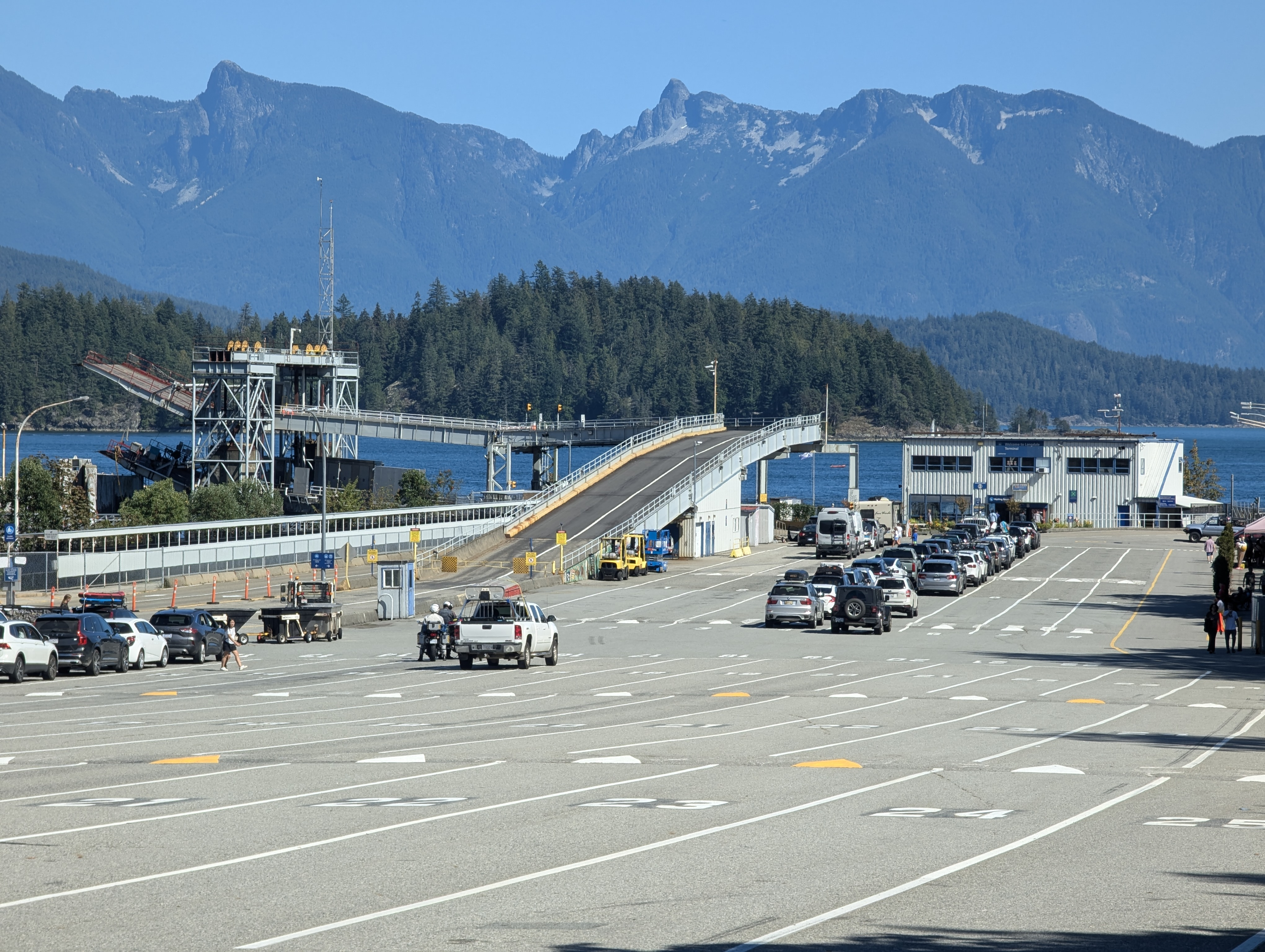

General information
- Location: 1376 Port Mellon Hwy; Langdale, British Columbia; Canada
- Coordinates: 49°26′0.5″N 123°28′19″W
- System: Ferry terminal
- Owner: BC Ferries
- Operator: BC Ferries
- Lines: Route 3–Horseshoe Bay; Route 13–Gambier Island, Keats Island
- Bus routes: 2
- Connections: Sunshine Regional: 1 Sechelt; 90 Sechelt (Express)

Construction
- Parking: 60 short-term spaces 287 long-term spaces

Other information
- Station code: LANG
- Website: www.bcferries.com/travel-boarding/terminal-directions-parking-food/sunshine-coast-langdale/LNG

Passengers
- 2023: 1 392 986 (Note: Figures obtained for 2022 & 2023 from adding the passengers counted at Langdale from the routes 1 and 13 in each month of the calendar year. The figures under "Total Prev Year" are not used because those denote fiscal years instead of calendar years. The total passenger count at Langdale for 2022 was 1 309 642.) ▲6.36%
Location

Langdale is a ferry terminal owned and operated by BC Ferries, which provides ferry services from the Sunshine Coast to the Lower Mainland, Gambier Island, and Keats Island in the Canadian province of British Columbia.

Route 3 is a car/passenger ferry route to Horseshoe Bay in West Vancouver. Route 13 to Gambier Island and Keats Island only offers passenger service.

British Columbia Highway 101 is connected to this terminal through an off-ramp that leads to North Gibsons.

== Incidents and accidents ==
On 26 March 2019, the Queen of Surrey crashed into a dock with 285 passengers on board at around 08:10. As a result, passengers were stuck on board the vessel for eleven hours. At 17:15, BC Ferries received permission from Transport Canada to use a Seaspan tugboat to free the vessel from the dock, and at 18:15, passengers were allowed to disembark. BC Ferries reported that no spills and no injuries ensued from this incident.
