= Saltery Bay =

- Unincorporated community
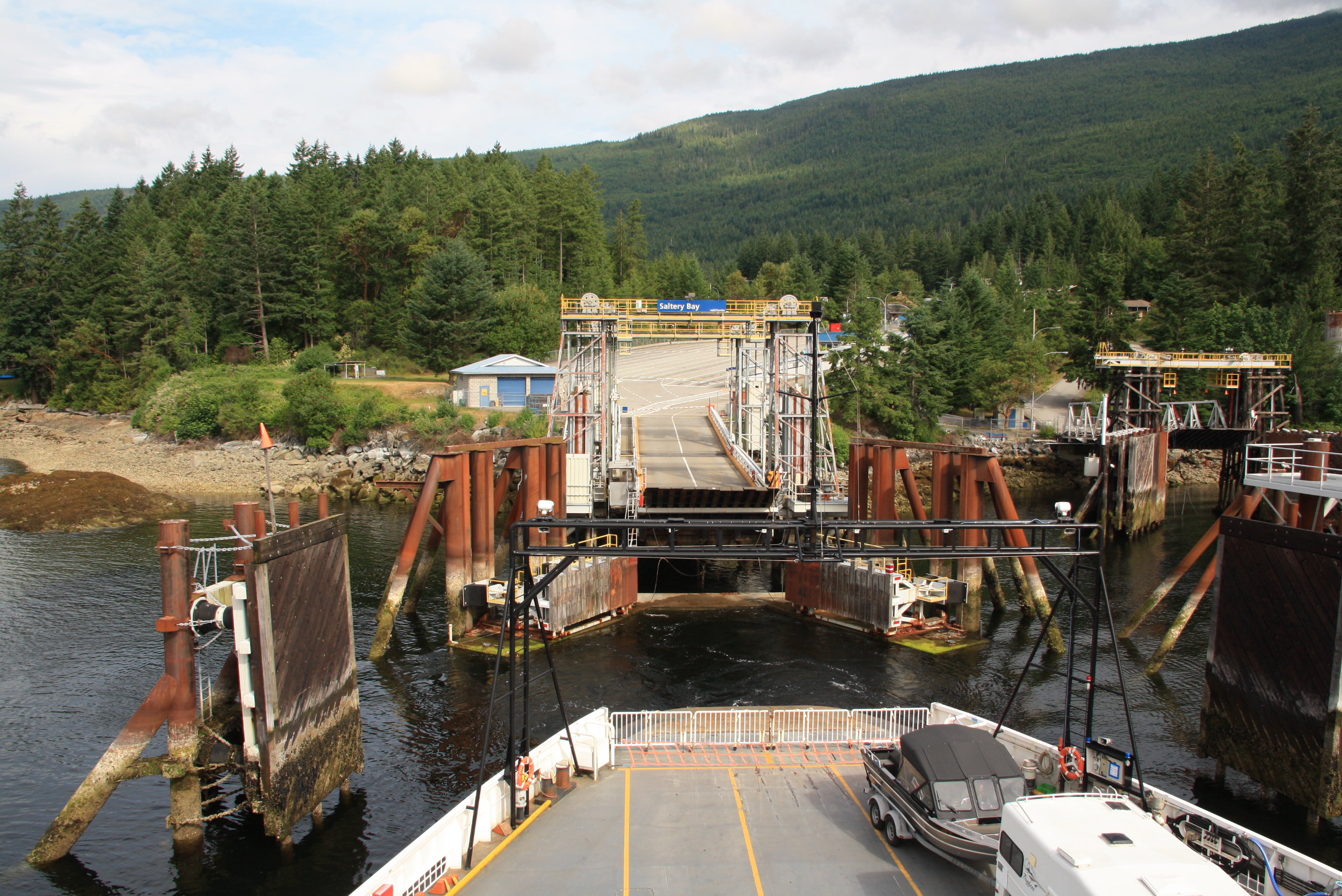
- Saltery Bay Ferry Terminal

- Location in British Columbia
- Coordinates: 49°47′00″N 124°11′00″W
- Country: Canada
- Province: British Columbia
- Regional district: qathet
- Time zone: UTC−07:00 (PT)
- Area code: 604
- Highways: Highway 101

Saltery Bay is an unincorporated community on the Sunshine Coast of southern British Columbia, Canada. It is located about 30 kilometres (19 mi) southeast of the city of Powell River. It is adjacent to Saltery Bay Provincial Park.

== Saltery Bay Ferry Terminal ==
The Saltery Bay Ferry Terminal is a BC Ferries terminal that links British Columbia Highway 101 across Jervis Inlet to Earls Cove. Known as the Sechelt – Powell River (Earls Cove–Saltery Bay) ferry, it is about 9.5 nautical miles (17.6 km) long and is serviced by the Malaspina Sky.
