= Skookumchuck Narrows =

Strait in British Columbia, Canada

Coordinates: 49°44′51″N 123°54′28″W

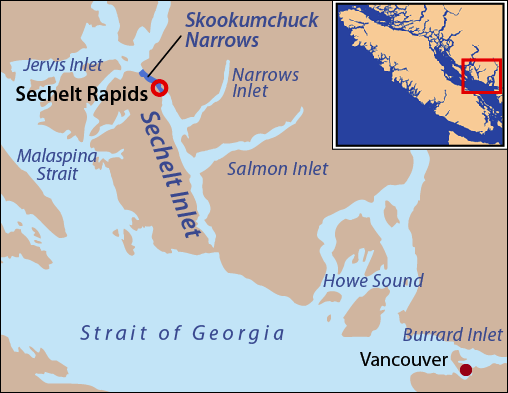
Sechelt Inlet, with Skookumchuck Narrows highlighted and Sechelt Rapids circled.

Skookumchuck Narrows is a strait forming the entrance of Sechelt Inlet on British Columbia's Sunshine Coast in Canada. Before broadening into Sechelt Inlet, all of its tidal flow together with that of Salmon Inlet and Narrows Inlet must pass through Sechelt Rapids. At peak flows, standing waves, whitecaps, and whirlpools form at the rapids even in calm weather. The narrows are also the site of Skookumchuck Narrows Provincial Park.

Each day, tides force large amounts of seawater through the narrows—760,000,000 m^{3} (200×10^{9} US gal) of water on a 3 m (9.8 ft) tide. The difference in water levels on either side of the rapids can exceed 2 m (6 ft 7 in) in height. Current speeds can exceed 16 knots (30 km/h; 18 mph), up to 17.68 kn (32.74 km/h; 20.35 mph).

The tidal patterns keep the water moving at virtually all times in the narrows area, which attracts a plethora of interesting sea life.

The unrelated B.C. town of Skookumchuck is several hundred kilometres east in the East Kootenay region of the province. Another location bearing this name, Skookumchuck Hot Springs, is on the Lillooet River east of Whistler. All locations take their name from Chinook Jargon for "strong water" and the term is common in maritime jargon for any set of strong rapids, particularly those at the mouth of inlets.

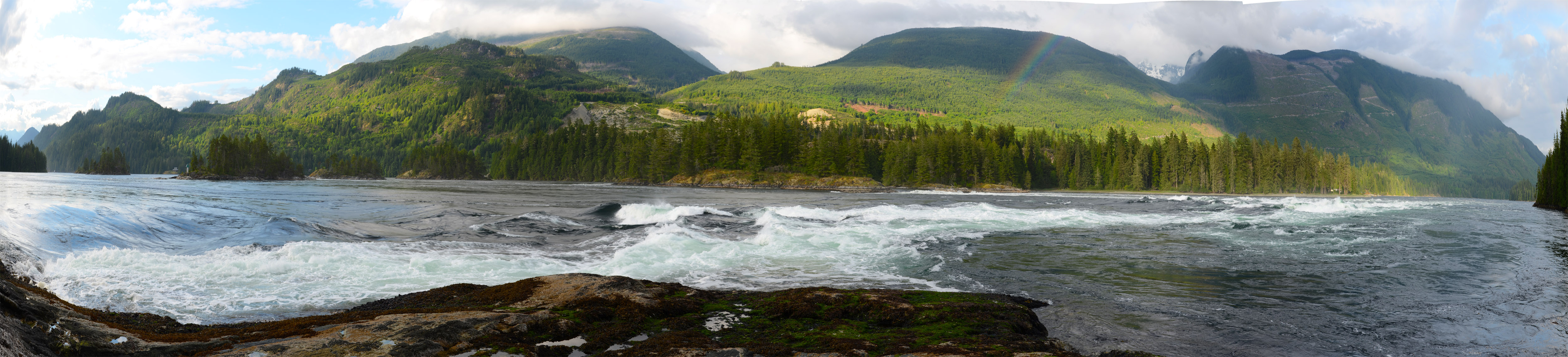
Skookumchuck Narrows at high tide

== In popular culture ==
Skookumchuck Narrows features in the book A Whale Named Henry, the posthumously published second book by M. Wylie Blanchet, author of The Curve of Time.^{;} The book is the story of a small whale who gets trapped behind the rapids.

== See also ==
- List of fjords in Canada
- List of Chinook Jargon place names
- Saltstraumen
- Mount Richardson Provincial Park
