= Langdale, British Columbia =

Langdale
- Unincorporated community
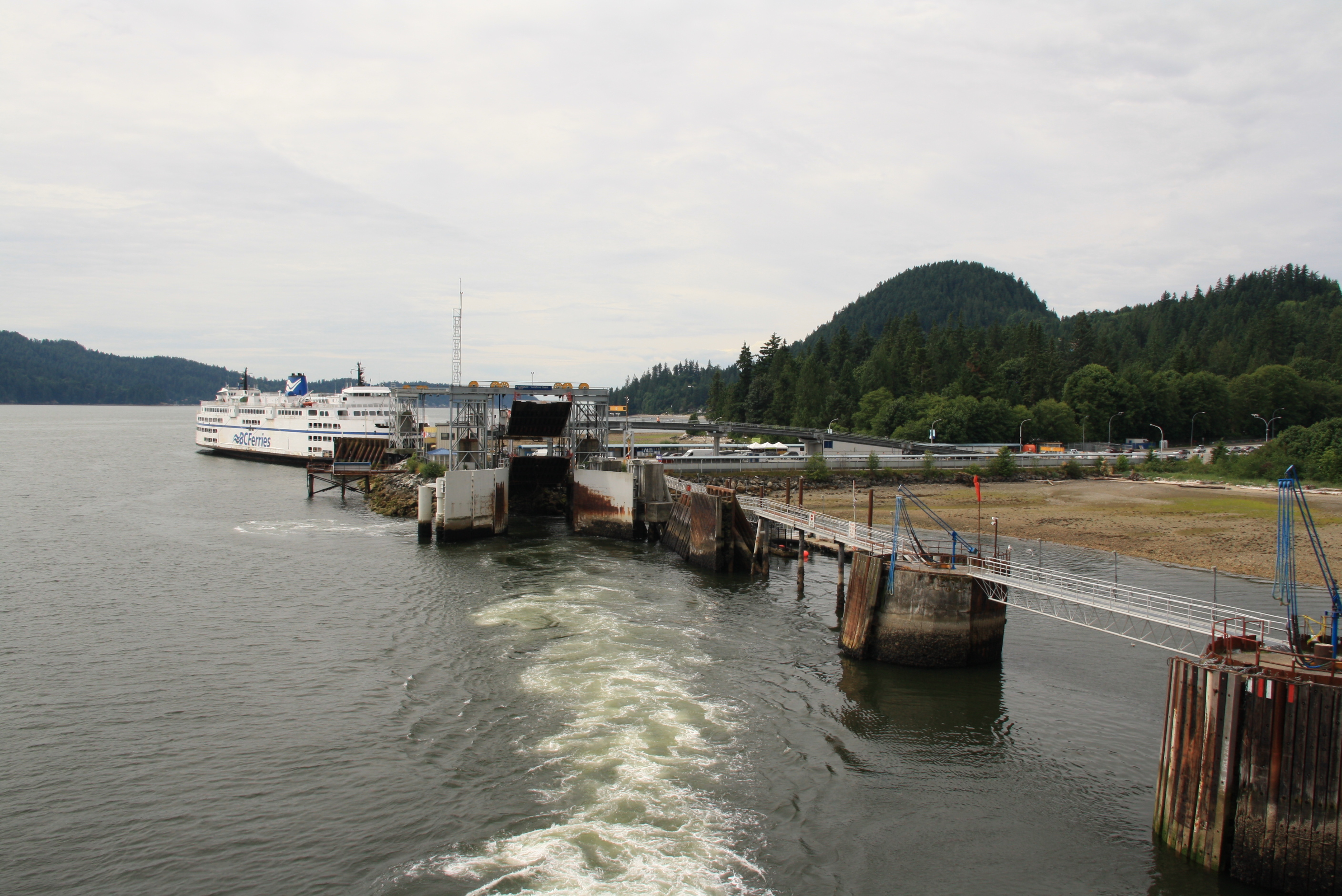
- Langdale ferry terminal

- Location in British Columbia
- Coordinates: 49°26′2″N 123°28′45″W
- Country: Canada
- Province: British Columbia
- Regional district: Sunshine Coast
- Area code: 604

Langdale is a small residential community in British Columbia, Canada, located within the territory of the Squamish Nation, and part of West Howe Sound, Electoral Area F within the Sunshine Coast Regional District (SCRD).

Langdale has no significant industry other than a ferry terminal. It is also the location of School District 46's Langdale Elementary School.

North of Langdale along the Port Mellon Highway is the small community of Williamson's Landing, as well as Port Mellon, home of the Howe Sound Pulp and Paper Mill.

The settlement is named after Robinson Henry Langdale (1835–1908) who preempted land on Langdale Creek in 1892.

== Ferry terminal ==
Langdale Ferry Terminal, operated by BC Ferries, is located in Langdale and is the community's only major commercial activity. The terminal provides vehicle transport connecting the Sunshine Coast region to Vancouver's Horseshoe Bay, as well as foot-passenger service to Keats Island and Gambier Island.

The terminal has two berths, however only one operates full-time with two ramps to access both the lower and higher-level ferry deck simultaneously. The second berth, with a single ramp only, operates seasonally or occasionally as a dock for vessels not in service.

British Columbia Highway 101 is connected to the terminal through an offramp that leads to Gibsons.
