= Ambrose Lake (Algoma District) =

Lake in Algoma District, Ontario, Canada

- Location within Ontario
- Location: Algoma District, Ontario
- Coordinates: 48°13′51″N 85°18′12″W
- Primary outflows: Unnamed creek to Iron Lake
- Basin countries: Canada
- Max. length: 2.4 km (1.5 mi)
- Max. width: .13 km (0.081 mi)
- Surface elevation: 417 m (1,368 ft)

Ambrose Lake is a lake in Algoma District, Ontario, Canada. It is about 2,400 metres (7,874 ft) long and 130 metres (427 ft) wide, and lies between Lake Superior and Highway 17 at an elevation of 417 metres (1,368 ft) about 40 kilometres (25 mi) south of the community of White River and 50 kilometres (31 mi) northwest of Wawa. The primary outflow is an unnamed creek to Iron Lake, part of the Dog River system.

== See also ==
- List of lakes in Ontario
