= Malaspina Sky =

I-class ship owned by BC Ferries

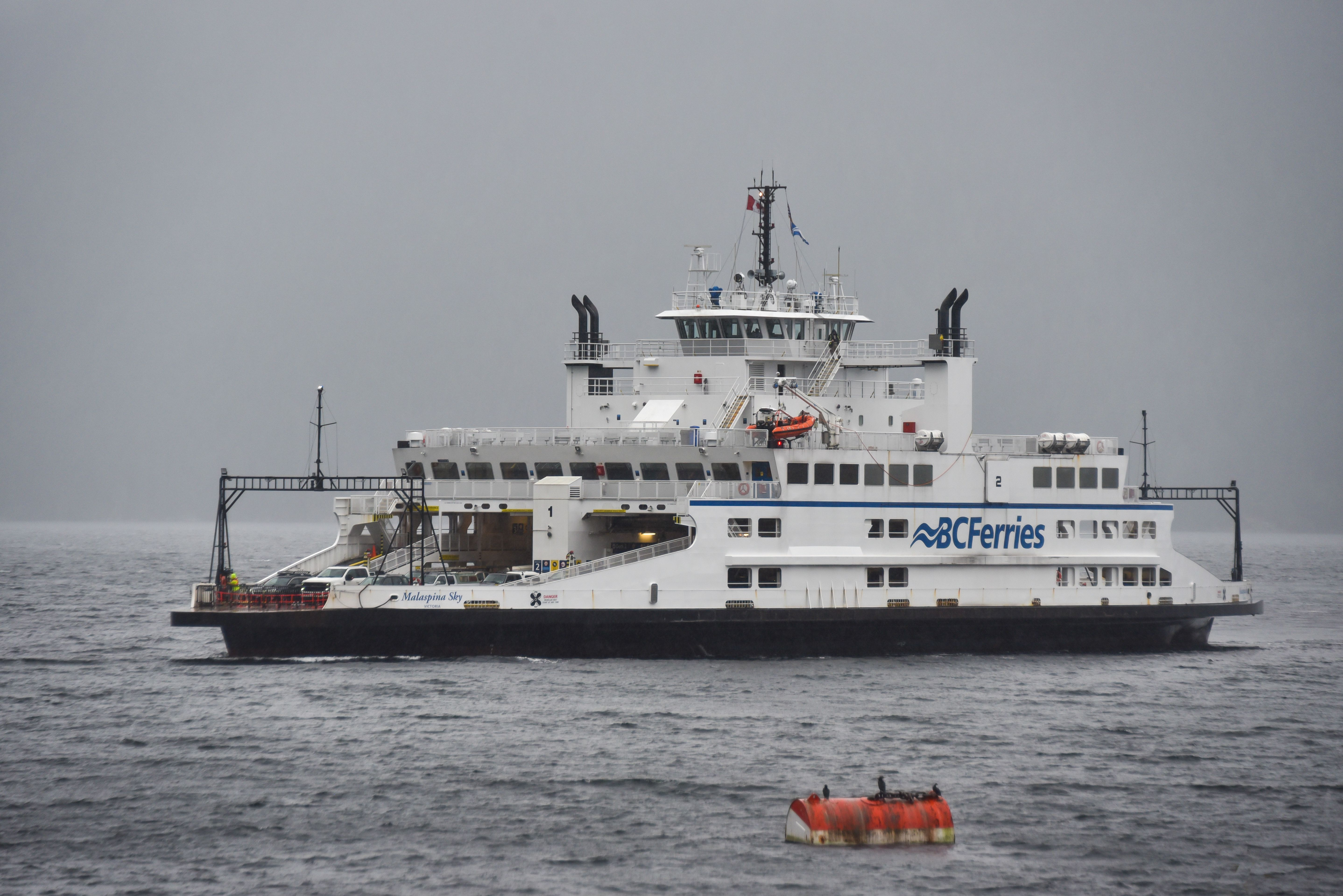
- Malaspina Sky approaching Saltery Bay in rain and mist

History

Canada
- Name: Island Sky (2008–2019) Malaspina Sky (2019–present)
- Owner: BC Ferries
- Operator: British Columbia Ferry Services Inc.
- Route: Earl's Cove-Saltery Bay
- Builder: Washington Marine Group, Esquimalt and North Vancouver
- Launched: 2008
- Completed: December 10, 2008
- In service: February 19, 2009
- Renamed: October 24, 2019
- Identification: IMO number: 9370458; MMSI number: 316012774; Callsign: CFN5148
- Status: in active service

General characteristics
- Class & type: Intermediate-class RORO ferry
- Displacement: 3,397 tonnes
- Length: 102 m (335 ft)
- Installed power: 4,416 hp (3,293 kW)
- Propulsion: Four Niigata 6L25HX
- Speed: 15.5 knots (28.7 km/h; 17.8 mph)
- Capacity: 462 passengers & crew; 125 cars

Malaspina Sky is an Intermediate-class ferry in the BC Ferries fleet built in 2008.

Originally named Island Sky, the ship has operated on the Earl's Cove–Saltery Bay route since its first day of service for BC Ferries on February 19, 2009. However, it was used on the Powell River (Westview) - Little River (Comox) run as the replacement vessel for Queen of Burnaby while the latter was being refitted, and during the upgrades to both those terminals (October 2013 to March 2014). The vessel was temporarily assigned to the Horseshoe Bay to Langdale route (March/April 2017), whilst the dock at Langdale was being upgraded.

The ship was renamed Malaspina Sky in a ceremony on October 24, 2019. The ship was renamed as part of a BC Ferries' initiative to standardize its naming conventions, to release the name, and to prevent confusion with the upcoming Island-class ferries being delivered in 2020.

== Design and construction ==
The passenger section of this ship was built at the Washington Marine Group (WMG) shipyards in Esquimalt, British Columbia, while the engines and hull were assembled at WMG's North Vancouver facility. The ship was built between 2006 and 2009, and was delivered almost ten months later than contracted. Despite some problems delaying her transfer to BC Ferries, she has provided effective and reliable service to date. The contract was fixed price, with penalties for delays, but BC Ferries was not fiscally responsible for any overruns. On December 10, 2008, BC Ferries formally accepted the vessel.
