= Mount Richardson Provincial Park =

Provincial park in British Columbia, Canada

- IUCN category II (national park)
- Location within British Columbia
- Interactive map of Mount Richardson Provincial Park
- Location: British Columbia, Canada
- Nearest city: Sechelt
- Coordinates: 49°34′04″N 123°45′39″W
- Area: 10.01 km^{2} (3.86 sq mi)
- Established: June 28, 1999
- Governing body: BC Parks

Mount Richardson Provincial Park is a provincial park in British Columbia, Canada, located on the lower Sunshine Coast to the north of Sechelt.
