= Agamemnon Channel =

Coordinates: 49°42′00″N 124°04′00″W

Agamemnon Channel (shashishalh lilkw´ émin) is a channel or strait in British Columbia, Canada, at the mouth of Jervis Inlet on the South Coast, separating Nelson Island (W and NW) from the mainland of the Sunshine Coast (E and SE). The ferry terminal and recreational community of Earls Cove is on its mainland side.

== Name origin ==
The channel was named in 1860 by Captain George Henry Richards of HMS Plumper in honour of the 64-gun third rate HMS Agamemnon, the first line-of-battle ship commanded by Horatio Nelson, for whom adjacent Nelson Island was also named.
