= Sunshine Coast Regional District =

Regional district in British Columbia, Canada

Sunshine Coast
- Regional district
- Sunshine Coast Regional District
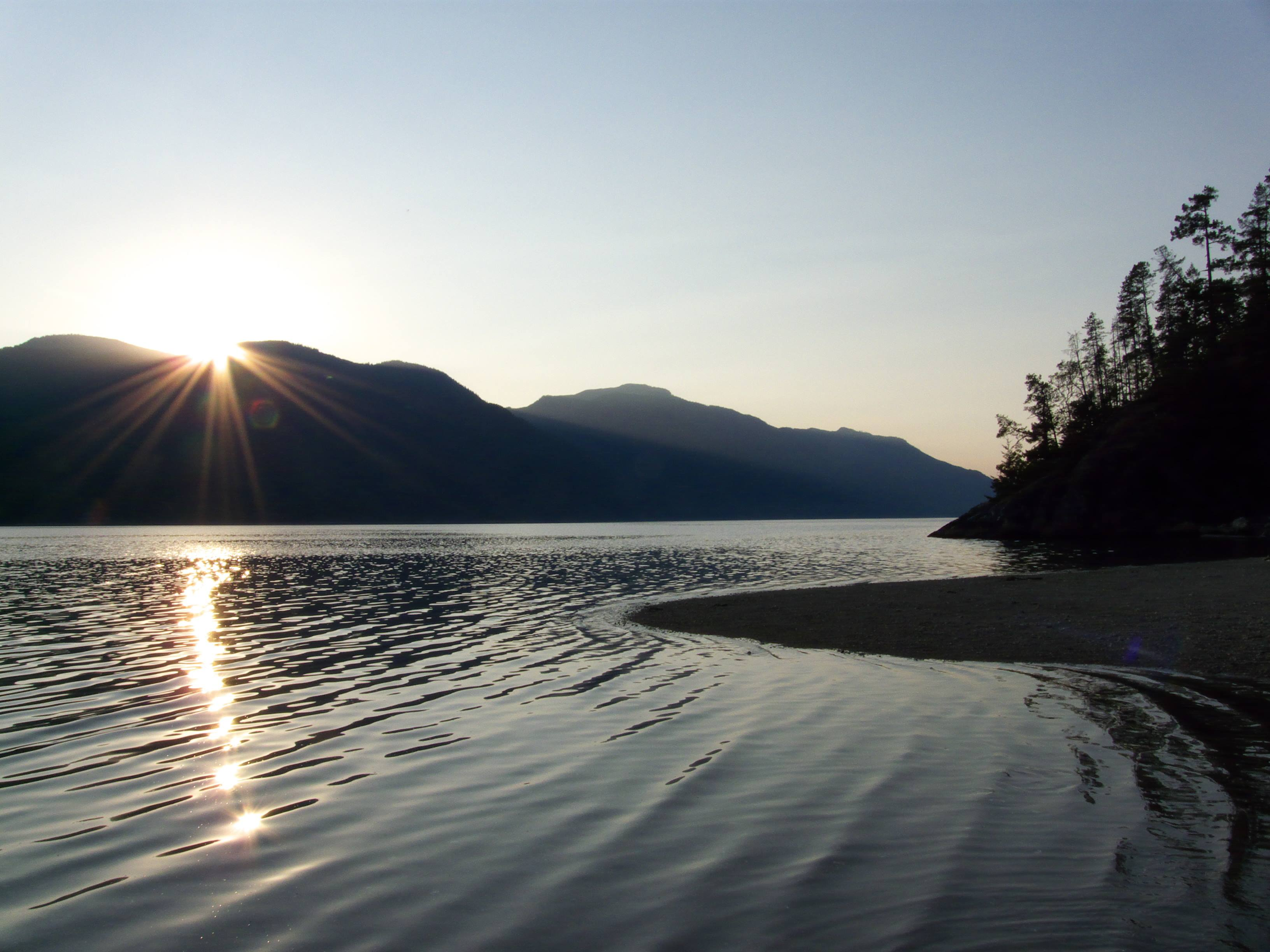
- Sechelt Inlet

- Location in British Columbia
- Coordinates: 50°00′N 123°45′W
- Country: Canada
- Province: British Columbia
- Administrative office location: Sechelt

Government
  - Type: Regional district
  - Body: Board of Directors
  - Chair: Alton Toth (District of Sechelt)
  - Vice Chair: Justine Gabias (Area B)
  - Electoral Areas: A - Egmont/Pender Harbour; B - Halfmoon Bay; D - Roberts Creek; E - Elphinstone; F - West Howe Sound

Area
  - Land: 3,773.73 km^{2} (1,457.05 sq mi)

Population (2021)
  - Total: 32,170
  - Density: 8.5/km^{2} (22/sq mi)
- Website: www.scrd.ca

The Sunshine Coast Regional District is a regional district in British Columbia, Canada. It is located on the southern mainland coast, across Georgia Strait (part of the Salish Sea) from Vancouver Island. It borders on the qathet Regional District to the north, the Squamish-Lillooet Regional District to the east, and, across Howe Sound, the Metro Vancouver District to the south. The regional district offices are located in the District Municipality of Sechelt.

== Geography ==
The majority of the Sunshine Coast is sparsely populated. The Coast Mountains make up the inland area. Population is concentrated along the coast. Midway up the coast, beginning at the town of Sechelt, the coastal area forms a peninsula separated from the inland area by Sechelt Inlet. The 2016 census reported a total population of 29,970 persons living on a land area of 3,778.17 km^{2} (1,458.76 sq mi).

The Sunshine Coast is typically accessed via boat or plane; no roads connect the district with the rest of the province. From Vancouver, ferries run from Horseshoe Bay to Gibsons across Howe Sound. At the northern end of the peninsula, ferries run from Earl's Cove to Saltery Bay.

== Communities ==
=== District municipality ===
- Sechelt - Pop 10,201

=== Town ===
- Gibsons - Pop 4,605

=== First Nations Government District ===
- shíshálh Nation Government District (sNGD) (Partial) - Pop 767 (2021)

=== First Nations Reserve Lands ===
- Chekwelp 26
- Chekwelp 26A
- Schaltuuch 27

=== Unincorporated ===
- Roberts Creek - Pop 3,421
- Halfmoon Bay
- Madeira Park
- Garden Bay
- Egmont
- Hopkins Landing
- Langdale

=== Electoral areas ===
Electoral Area	Pop 2021	% change 2016 - 2021	Pop 2016	Area Km2
A - Pender Harbour/Egmont/Madeira Park	3,039	16.0	2,619	1,898
B - Halfmoon Bay	2,969	8.9	2,726	1,270
D - Roberts Creek	3,523	3.0	3,421	143
E - Elphinstone	3,883	6.0	3,664	22
F - West Howe Sound	2,407	17.8	2,043	381

Sources Statistic Canada Census. Area A revised from 2,678 (2016)

== Demographics ==
As a census division in the 2021 Census of Population conducted by Statistics Canada, the Sunshine Coast Regional District had a population of 32,170 living in 14,935 of its 17,982 total private dwellings, a change of 7.3% from its 2016 population of 29,970. With a land area of 3,767.43 km^{2} (1,454.61 sq mi), it had a population density of 8.5/km^{2} (22.1/sq mi) in 2021.

Panethnic groups in the Sunshine Coast Regional District (2001−2021)
Panethnic group	2021		2016		2011		2006		2001	
Panethnic group	Pop.	%	Pop.	%	Pop.	%	Pop.	%	Pop.	%
European (Note: Statistic includes all persons that did not make up part of a visible minority or an indigenous identity.)	26,370	83.69%	25,320	86.21%	25,220	89.85%	24,770	90.04%	23,515	92.4%
Indigenous	2,270	7.2%	2,020	6.88%	1,430	5.09%	1,485	5.4%	1,215	4.77%
Southeast Asian (Note: Statistic includes total responses of "Filipino" and "Southeast Asian" under visible minority section on census.)	930	2.95%	560	1.91%	490	1.75%	230	0.84%	155	0.61%
East Asian (Note: Statistic includes total responses of "Chinese", "Korean", and "Japanese" under visible minority section on census.)	830	2.63%	800	2.72%	595	2.12%	510	1.85%	340	1.34%
South Asian	435	1.38%	235	0.8%	125	0.45%	95	0.35%	45	0.18%
African	230	0.73%	170	0.58%	115	0.41%	135	0.49%	100	0.39%
Latin American	135	0.43%	100	0.34%	20	0.07%	115	0.42%	55	0.22%
Middle Eastern (Note: Statistic includes total responses of "West Asian" and "Arab" under visible minority section on census.)	85	0.27%	45	0.15%	15	0.05%	60	0.22%	35	0.14%
Other (Note: Statistic includes total responses of "Visible minority, n.i.e." and "Multiple visible minorities" under visible minority section on census.)	230	0.73%	115	0.39%	60	0.21%	90	0.33%	10	0.04%
Total responses	31,510	97.95%	29,370	98%	28,070	98.08%	27,510	99.1%	25,450	99.42%
Total population	32,170	100%	29,970	100%	28,619	100%	27,759	100%	25,599	100%

- Note: Totals greater than 100% due to multiple origin responses.

== Provincial Parks ==
- Mount Richardson Provincial Park
- Tetrahedron Provincial Park
- Spipiyus Provincial Park

== See also ==
- Sunshine Coast (British Columbia)
