= Earls Cove, British Columbia =

Earls Cove
- Locality
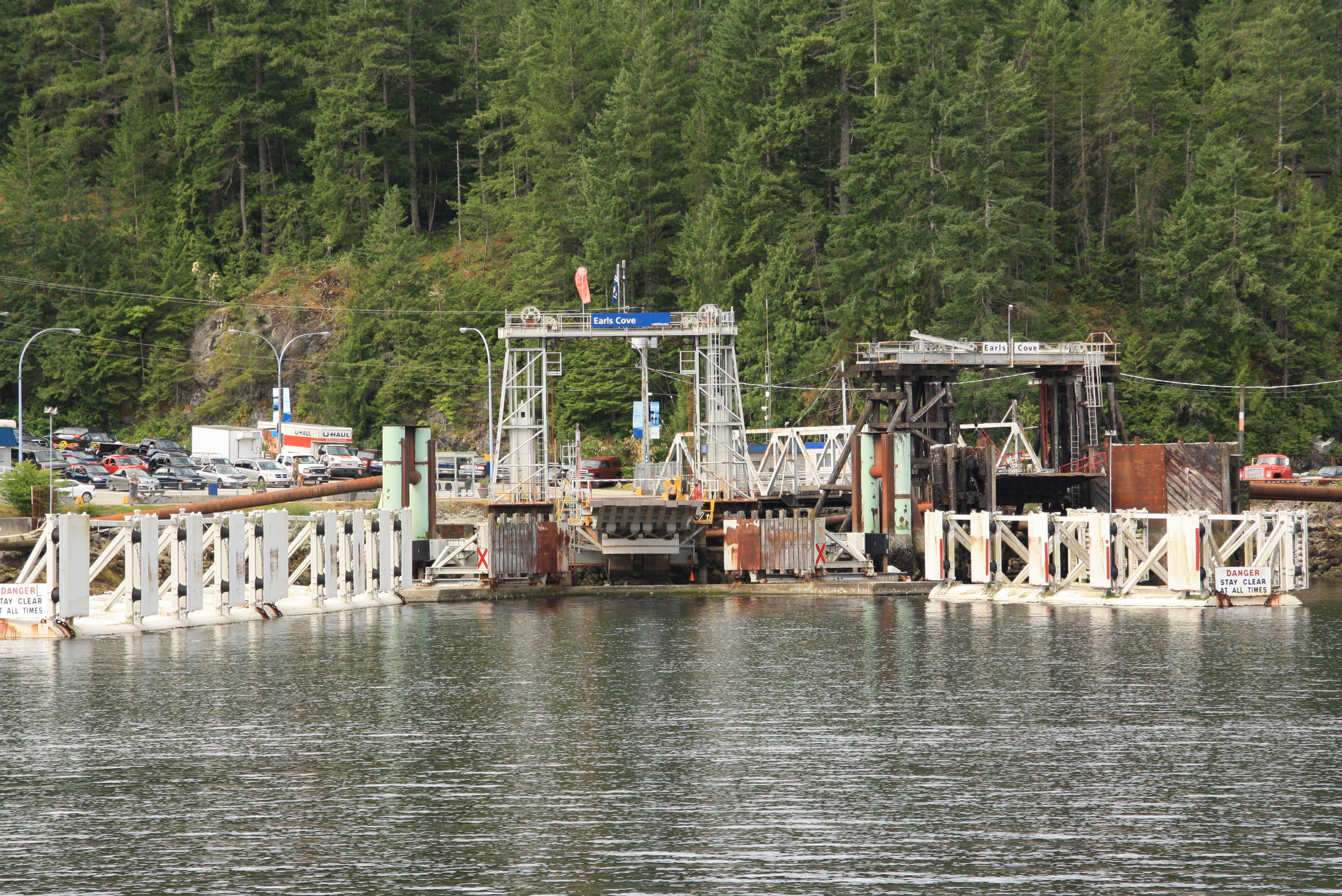
- Earls Cove Ferry Terminal

- Location in British Columbia
- Coordinates: 49°45′07″N 124°00′33″W
- Country: Canada
- Province: British Columbia
- Regional district: Sunshine Coast
- Time zone: UTC−07:00 (PT)
- Area code: 604
- Highways: Highway 101

Earls Cove is a small settlement located on Jervis Inlet in the Sunshine Coast region of British Columbia. It is a terminal for the BC Ferries route across the inlet to Saltery Bay, linking the Lower Sunshine Coast with the Upper Sunshine Coast. Earls Cove is at the north end of the Sechelt Peninsula and on the east side of the mouth of Jervis Inlet, adjacent to Agamemnon Channel, across which is Nelson Island.

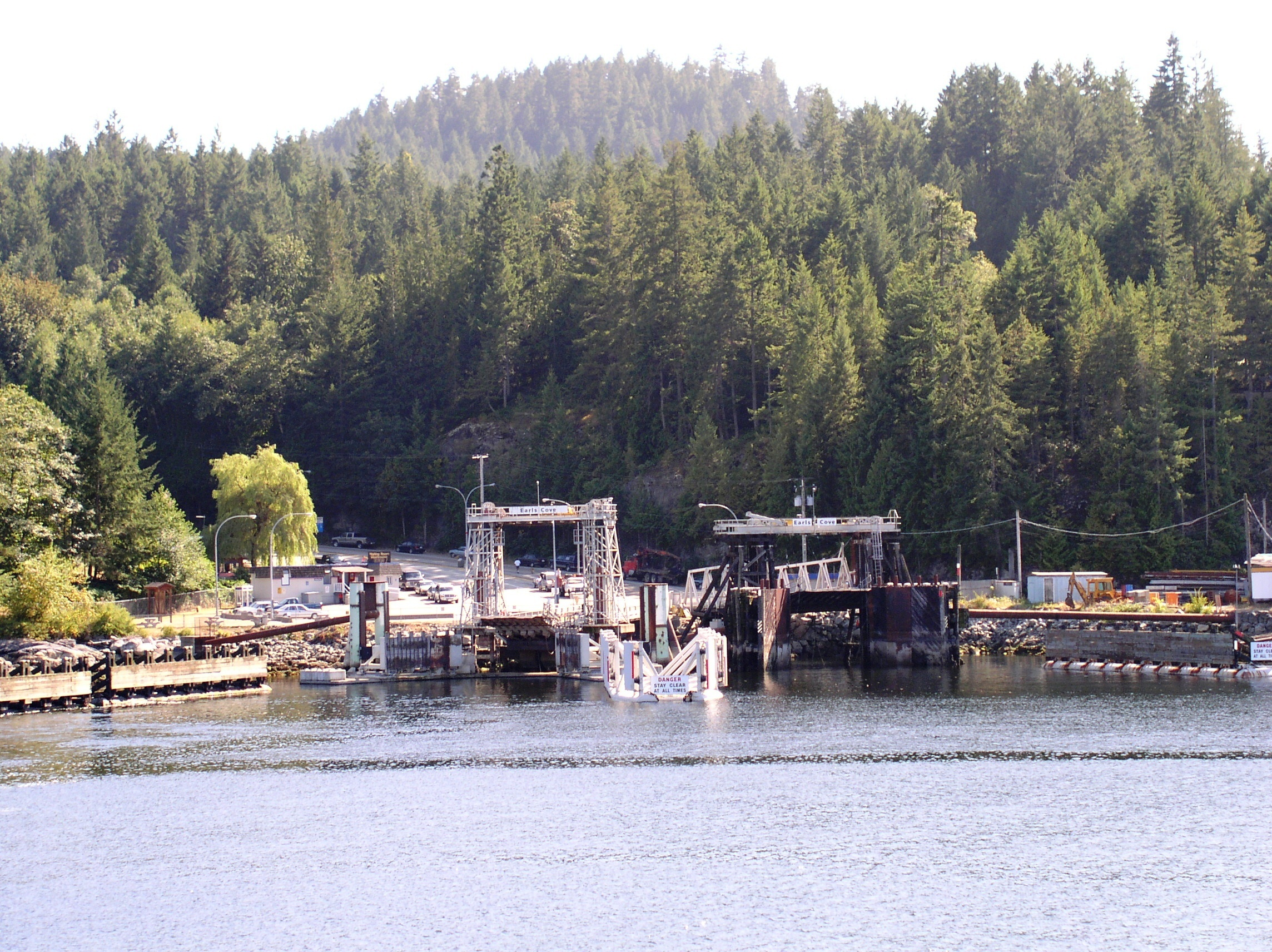
The BC Ferries docks

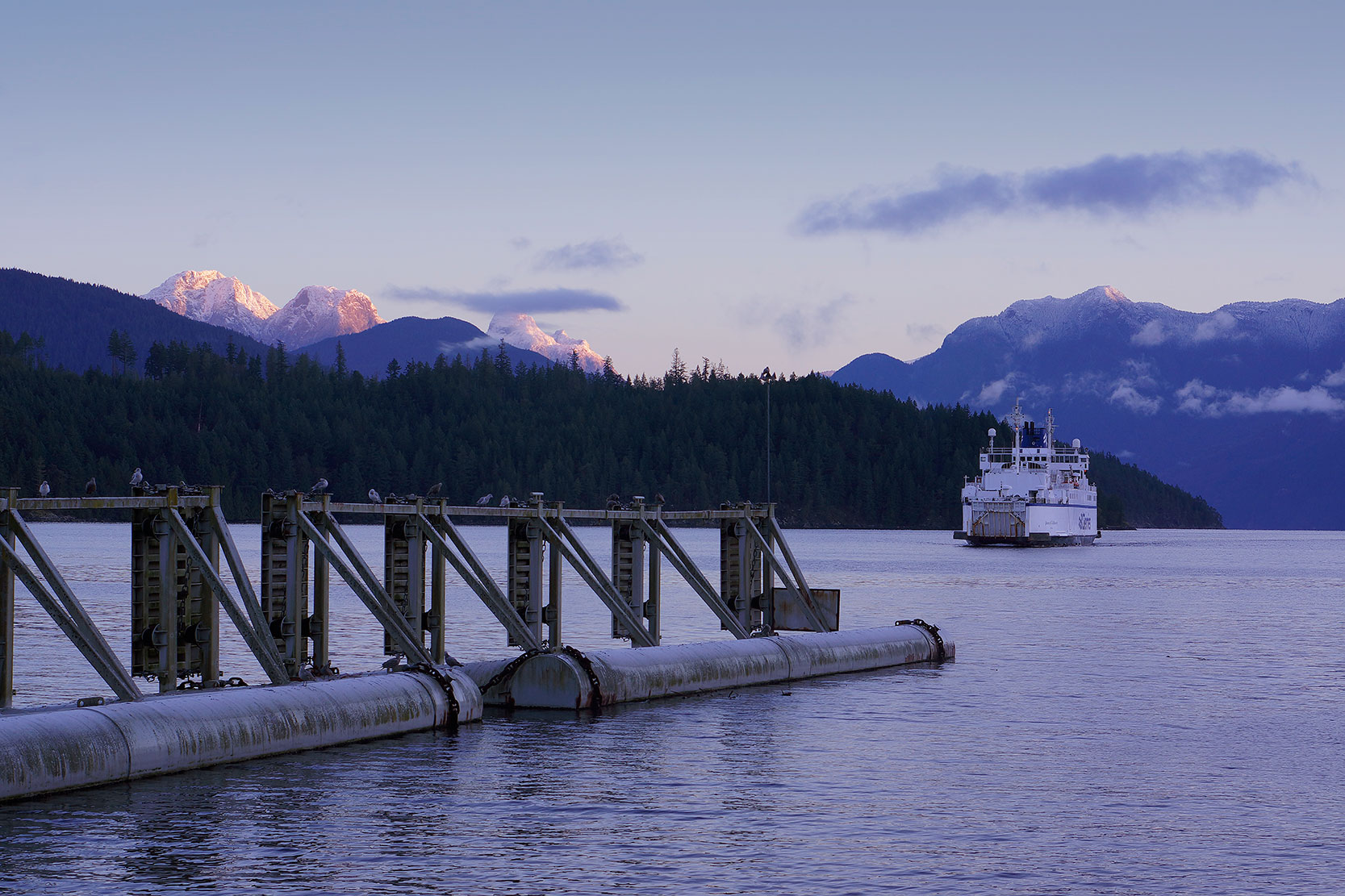
BC Ferry arriving at Earls Cove

== Origin of name ==
Earls Cove was named indirectly after an early pioneer of the area, Mr. Earl: the name was officialized in the plural form (rather than the possessive "Earl's") at the request of the community, as there were several families named Earl in the area.

== Access and transportation ==
Earls Cove is accessed by ferry terminal and paved highway. From the Lower Mainland, BC Ferries provides service from Horseshoe Bay to Langdale. From Langdale, Highway 101 runs to the end of the Sunshine Coast at the community of Lund; Earls Cove, and the ferry from Earls Cove to Saltery Bay, is approximately midway between Langdale and Lund. The distance from Vancouver to Earls Cove is 136 kilometres (85 mi). The ferry trip across the mouth of Jervis Inlet provides passengers with scenery little changed from when Captain George Vancouver explored the area in 1792.

=== Earls Cove Ferry Terminal ===
The Earls Cove Ferry Terminal is a BC Ferries terminal with two berths that links Highway 101 across Jervis Inlet to Saltery Bay. Known as the Sechelt – Powell River (Earls Cove–Saltery Bay) ferry, it is about 9.5 nautical miles (17.6 km) long and serviced by the Malaspina Sky. The trip by ferry from Earls Cove to Saltery Bay takes about 50 minutes.

== Climate ==
The Sunshine Coast lives up to its name - generally winters are mild and wet, and the summers drier than many other coastal areas. Average temperatures range from 4 °C (39 °F) in January to 18 °C (64 °F) in July. Average rainfall is about 100 cm (39 in); mild weather patterns mean that snowfall in the area is very light. The temperate climate has made this a popular area for retirees and vacationers looking for outdoor recreational opportunities of all sorts.

== Attractions ==
Nearby Sakinaw and Ruby Lakes are noted for their trout fishing in season. They are also freshwater havens for canoers and kayakers.

Ruby Lake Lagoon is home to over 80 species of birds, and to other animals. Wildlife watchers can observe Wood Duck, painted turtles, beavers, otters, elk, deer and bears.

The northern terminus of the Suncoaster Trail, a 33 km (21 mi) trail popular with hikers and bikers, is at Klein Lake, just east of Earls Cove. NIHO Land & Cattle Company (owners of recreational land) strongly recommend before attempting any hike in this region you first purchase a hiking guide from a local bookstore.

There are several provincial parks in the area, including Musket Island Marine Park. Ambrose Lake Ecological Reserve preserves a small coastal lake, adjacent bogland, and surrounding forest, and is open to the public for non-destructive pursuits like hiking, nature observation and photography.
