= Lund, British Columbia =

Lund / ƛaʔamɩn (Klah ah men)
- Unincorporated community Tla'amin Land
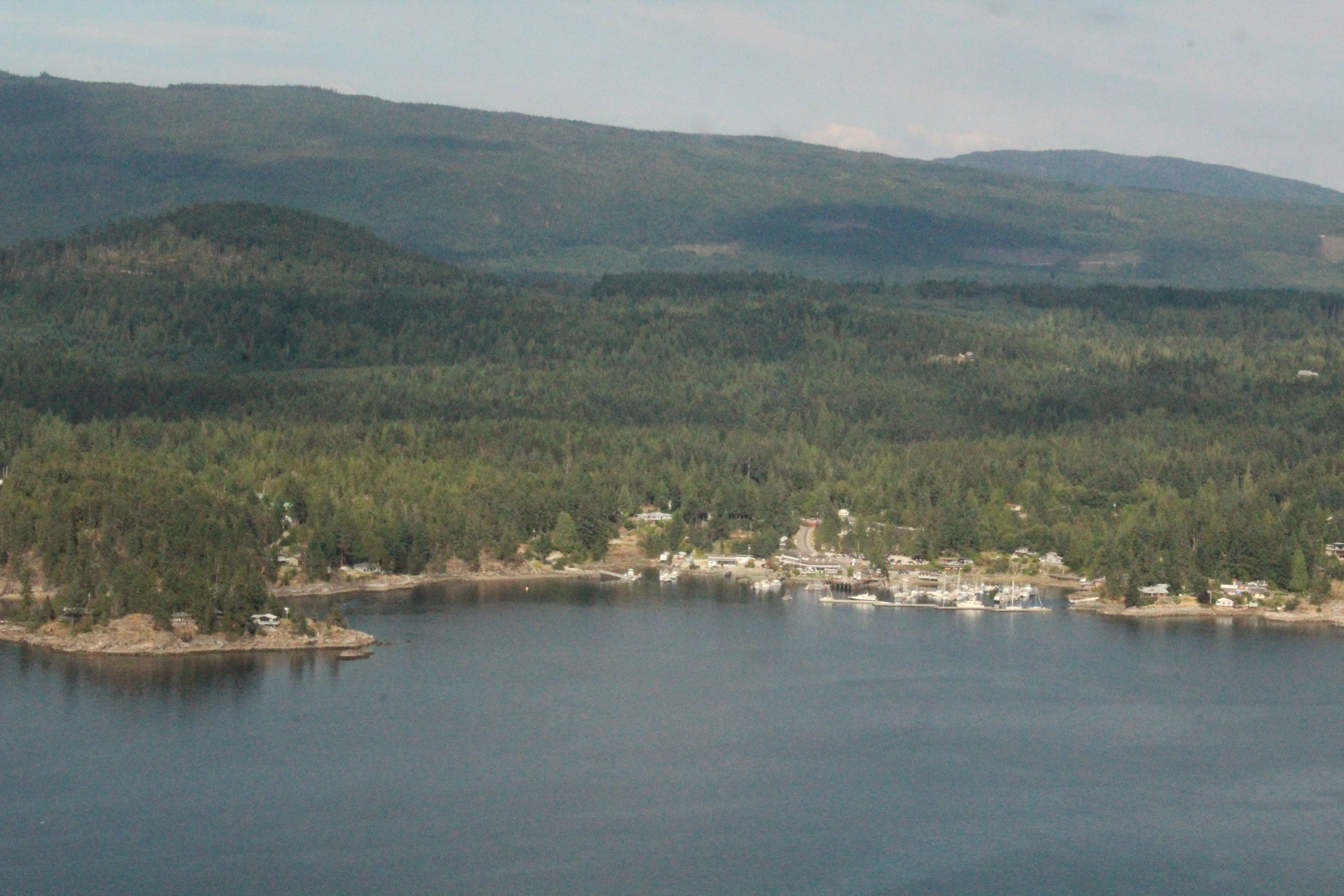
- Lund, seen from a floatplane

- Location of Lund within British Columbia
- Coordinates: 49°58′53″N 124°45′42″W
- Country: Canada
- Province: British Columbia
- Regional District: qathet Regional District
- Founded: 1889

Government
  - MP: Rachel Blaney (NDP)
  - MLA: Nicholas Simons (NDP)

Area
  - Total: 10.57 km^{2} (4.08 sq mi)

Population (2021)
  - Total: 292
  - Density: 27.6/km^{2} (71.5/sq mi)
- Time zone: UTC−07:00 (PT)
- Postal code: V0N 2G0
- Area code: 604

Lund is a small craft harbour and unincorporated village on Tla'amin land in qathet Regional District, British Columbia, Canada. It is along the northern part of the Salish Sea on the mainland BC coast. The main landmark in the village is the Lund Hotel, established in 1905. By boat from Lund, the Copeland Islands (Copeland Islands Marine Provincial Park) and Desolation Sound, (which includes Desolation Sound Marine Provincial Park) are nearby. Lund is home to a number of shops and services, including a general store and multiple restaurants.

== History ==
Lund was named by brothers Frederick and Charles Thulin, who came from Tryserum near Valdemarsvik, Sweden. When they settled at the harbour in December 1889, they named it after Lund, Sweden, because it was Swedish and fairly easy for non-Scandinavians to pronounce. When they arrived, the harbour was a Tla'amin village named ƛaʔamɩn (Klah ah men) . The Thulins built a store and in 1892 a post office was added followed by the first licensed hotel north of Vancouver two years later. Logging and fishing were the source of income in the early years. Transportation was by water. A second hotel, called the Malaspina, was built by the Thulins. When the original hotel was destroyed by a forest fire in 1918, the newer hotel, which continues to operate in the village, was renamed the Lund Hotel. A paved road leading south to Vancouver was completed in 1954 and coastal steamer service ended two years later. The original wharf built by the Thulins was damaged by a storm in 1954 and replaced by a government wharf.

== Transportation ==
Lund is the northern terminus of Highway 101. The highway is locally known as the Sunshine Coast Highway. Powell River is 22 kilometres (14 mi) south by road, from where BC Ferries offers service to Comox on Vancouver Island to the west across the Strait of Georgia. Transportation is also available from Powell River by private aircraft or scheduled service with Pacific Coastal Airlines, which offers half-hour flights to Vancouver. Road access to Vancouver to the south involves two ferry crossings of fjords along the Sunshine Coast.

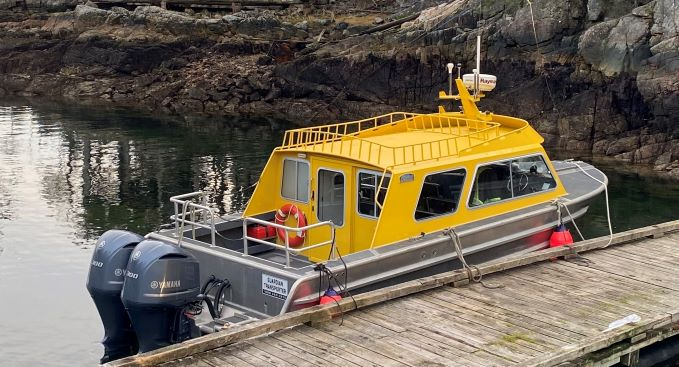
Savary Island Ferry at Dock

Lund harbour provides marine vessel access including regular water taxi service to Savary Island and is accessible by chartered float plane.

== Government and politics ==
As an unincorporated community, municipal government is provided by the qathet Regional District.

Lund is a part of the North Island-Powell River federal riding. Rachel Blaney, of the New Democratic Party of Canada, is the Member of Parliament. She was elected to represent the riding in the 2015 federal election.

Nicholas Simons of the NDP was elected to represent Lund as part of the Powell River-Sunshine Coast constituency in the 2005 BC general election and re-elected in 2009 and in 2013.

Lund’s unofficial sister unincorporated community is Alvin, British Columbia.

The Northside Volunteer Fire Department (NVFD) provides fire and emergency response services to the area from just north of the Village of Lund south to Wilde Road and includes properties on the west side of Okeover Inlet as far north as Penrose Bay.

== Education ==
Since 2010, Puddle Jumpers, a pre-school operating out of the Northside Community Recreation Center runs twice a week with about 13 children on average attending.

== Media ==
The Lund Barnacle is a quarterly magazine published by the Lund Community Society that covers the events and stories of the community. It is available at many shops in Lund and online. It was founded in 1988 and is still completely volunteer-run.

== Arts & Culture ==
Lund is home to a number of galleries and studios including the Tidal Art Centre, the Tug-Guhm Gallery Studio, Three Stone Soup Fibre Studio and Rare Earth Pottery.

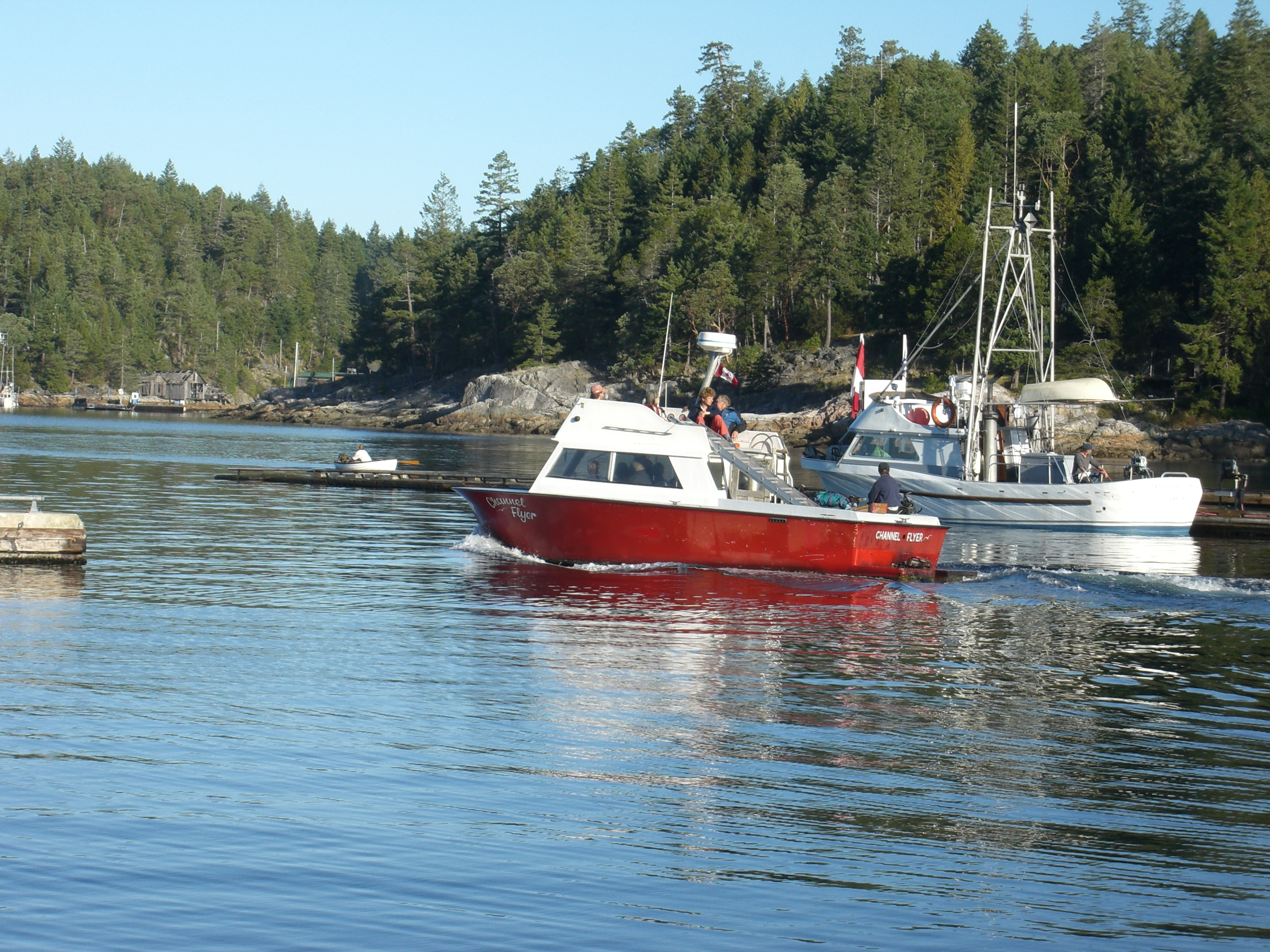
Water Taxi heads out from Lund for Savary Island

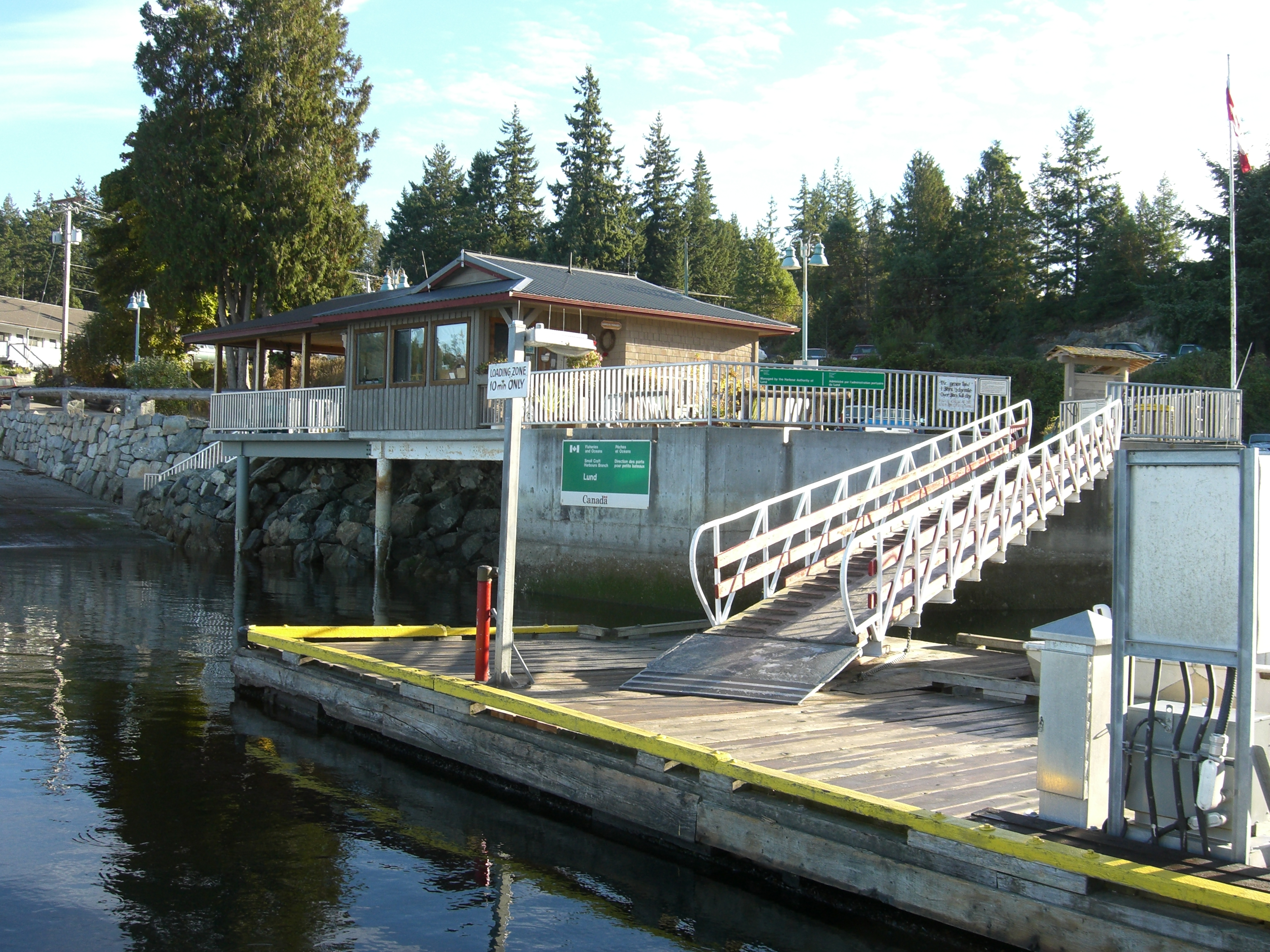
Lund Harbourmaster's Office
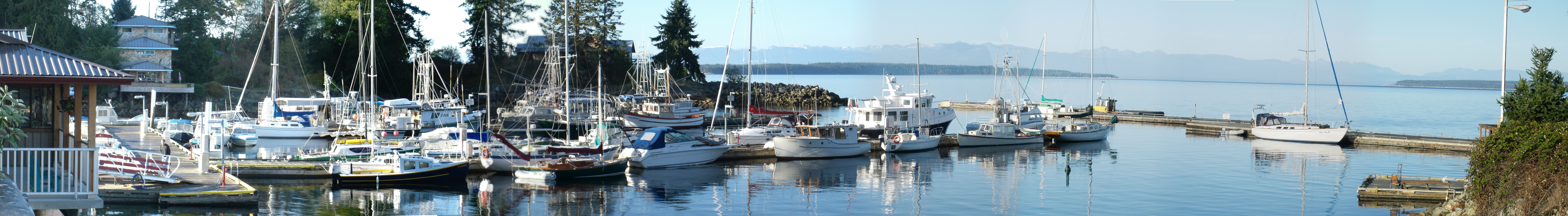
Docks at Lund Harbour
