= Madeira Park =

Community on the Sunshine Coast of British Columbia

Coordinates: 49°37′21″N 124°1′29.7″W

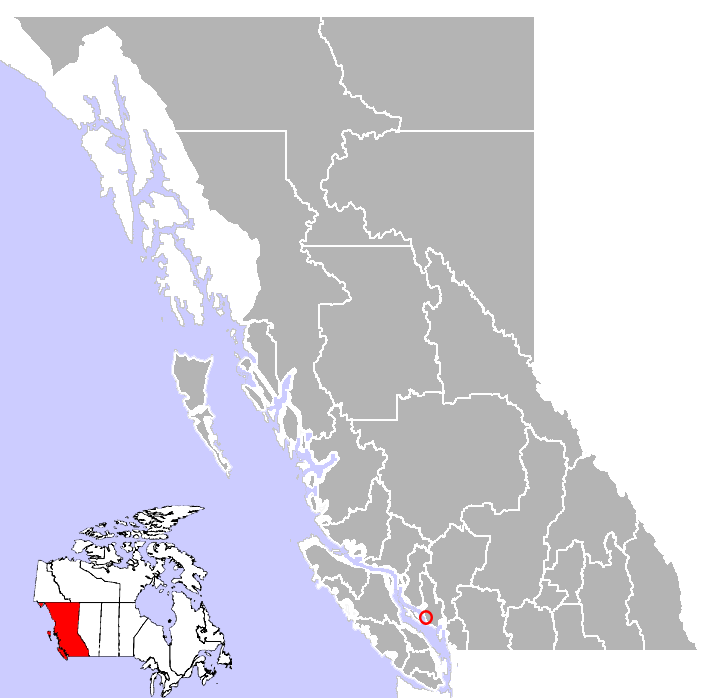
Location of Madeira Park, British Columbia

Madeira Park is an unincorporated community in the area of Pender Harbour on the Sunshine Coast of southwestern British Columbia, Canada.

It is named after the pioneer Jose Gonzalos, a native of the Madeira Islands who settled in the area in the early 1900s.
