= Sunshine Coast (British Columbia) =

Subregion of British Columbia, Canada

- Subregion of British Columbia
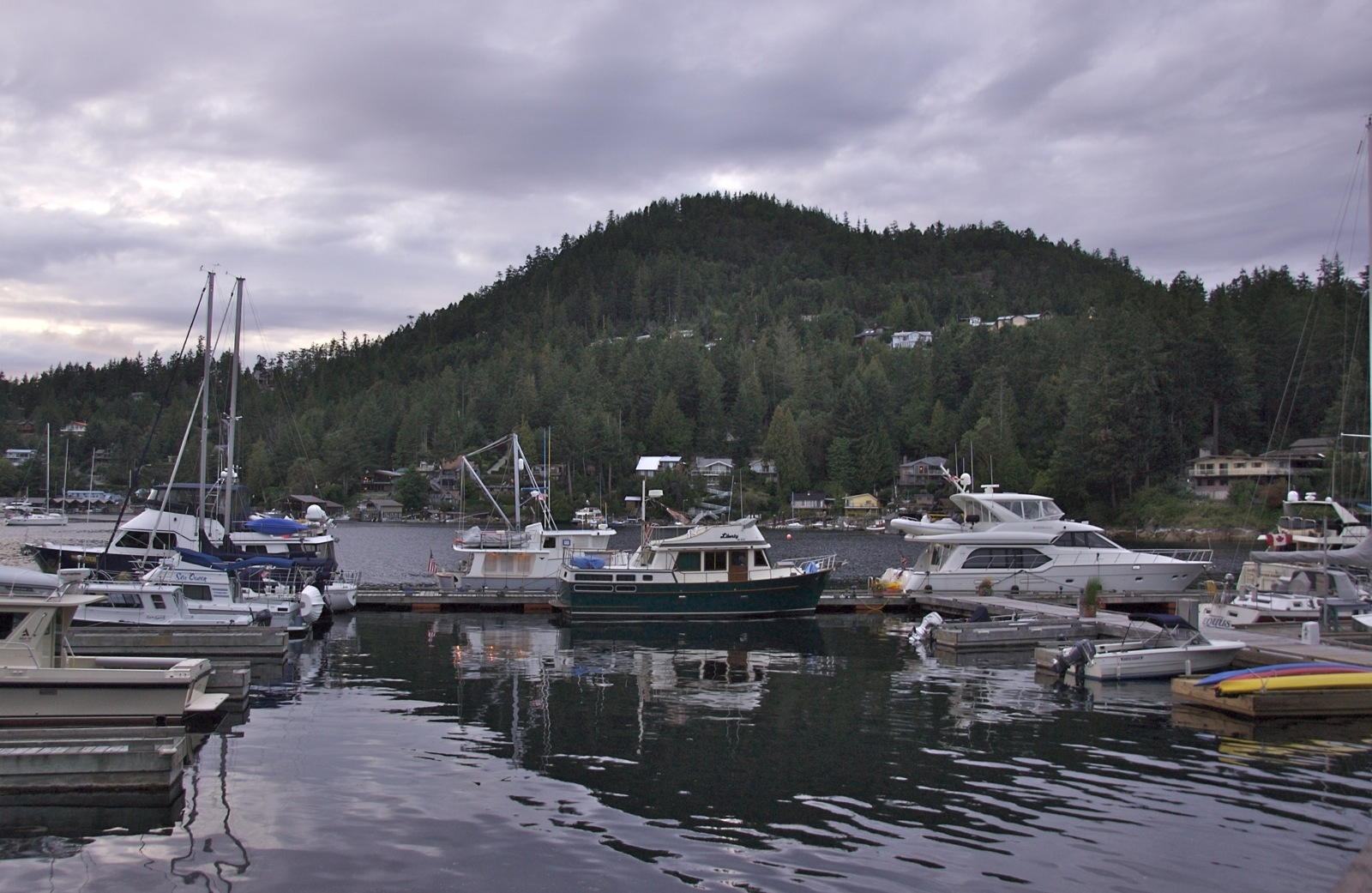
- Pender Harbour
- Interactive map of Sunshine Coast
- Coordinates: 49°41′00″N 124°11′00″W
- Country: Canada
- Province: British Columbia
- Region: British Columbia Coast

Area
  - Total: 8,849.06 km^{2} (3,416.64 sq mi)

Population (2016)
  - Total: 50,040
  - Density: 5.95/km^{2} (15.4/sq mi)
- Time zone: UTC−8 (PST)
  - Summer (DST): UTC−7 (PDT)
- Postal code prefixes: V

The Sunshine Coast is a geographic subregion of the British Columbia Coast that generally comprises the regional districts of qathet and Sunshine Coast.

While populous and frequently visited by tourists, the Sunshine Coast has no access roads built around or across the fjords separating it from the rest of the province. It can be reached only by ferry (BC Ferries), floatplane, commercial aircraft (Pacific Coastal Airlines) using the Powell River Airport (CYPW), or private or chartered aircraft using the Sechelt Aerodrome (CAP3).

== Geography ==
The Sunshine Coast is a subregion of the mainland coast of British Columbia. It is bound by Howe Sound to the southeast, on the other side of which lies the Metro Vancouver Regional District. Continuing with bound areas, Desolation Sound is to the northwest, the Pacific Ranges are to the northeast, and the Strait of Georgia is to the southwest. The region is bisected by Jervis Inlet. The region features a coastal lowland that gradually transitions to steep-sided mountains as you move toward the northeast.

The major islands of the Sunshine Coast include Anvil Island, Gambier Island, Goat Island, Hernando Island, Keats Island, Savary Island, and most of the Northern Gulf Islands.

=== Ecology ===
The Coast's wildlife includes cougars, black bears, wolves, marbled murrelet, orcas, great blue herons, seals, sea lions and bald eagles. There are also abundant tide pools with a variety of molluscs, sea anemones and fish.

=== Climate ===
The lowlands have a warm-summer Mediterranean climate (Köppen: Csb) with warm, dry summers and cool, wet winters. Higher elevations feature a marine west coast climate (Köppen: Cfb) with warm summers, mild winters, and moderate rainfall throughout the year.

== Demographics ==
As of the 2021 Census, the population of the Sunshine Coast totals 53,666:

- 32,170 in the Sunshine Coast Regional District
- 21,496 in Powell River Regional District

=== Major communities ===
The major communities of the Sunshine Coast are as follows:

- Powell River (pop. 13,943)
- Sechelt (pop. 10,847)
- Gibsons (pop. 4,758)
- Roberts Creek (pop. 1,949)

== Economy ==
Historically, the economy of the Sunshine Coast was driven primarily by industries such as logging and mining.

Today, forestry and tourism form much of the local economy.

== Culture ==
The Sunshine Coast is home to more artists per capita than any other Canadian region. Purple flags along the Sunshine Coast Highway and local streets indicate artists's studios where the public is welcome, and which feature many disciplines including painting, pottery and glassblowing.

== Transportation ==
Due to its mountainous terrain, the Sunshine Coast is not directly linked over land to the surrounding coast. Instead, BC Ferries provides ferry service linking the coast to surrounding regions. Notable lines include Horseshoe Bay-Langdale, Little River-Westview, and Earls Cove-Saltery Bay. Minor ferry operators and water taxis provide service to minor islands dotting the strait.

The region is served by British Columbia Highway 101, which runs along the coast between the communities of Langdale and Lund.

== Attractions ==
Some attractions specific to the Sunshine Coast include:

- Copeland Islands Marine Provincial Park
- Desolation Sound Marine Provincial Park
- Hidden Grove/Sechelt Heritage Forest
- Skookumchuck Narrows Provincial Park
- Smuggler Cove Marine Provincial Park
- Spipiyus Provincial Park
- tems swiya Museum - showcasing history and culture of the shíshálh people
- The northern terminus of Highway 101, which is located in the town of Lund

The region also features two notable trails:

- Powell Forest Canoe Route - a 57 km (35 mi) canoeing route through various lakes north of Powell River
- Sunshine Coast Trail - a 180 km (110 mi) long hiking trail between Saltery Bay and Sarah Point

== See also ==
- Lower Mainland
- Sea-to-Sky Corridor
