= List of provincial parks of Mainland British Columbia Coast =

The list of provincial parks of the Mainland British Columbia Coast contains the provincial parks located within this geographic region of the province of British Columbia. It includes parks from the eight regional districts of Central Coast, Kitimat-Stikine, North Coast, qathet, Squamish-Lillooet, Sunshine Coast, and the mainland portions of Mount Waddington and Strathcona. These parks are administered by BC Parks under the jurisdiction of the Ministry of Environment and Climate Change Strategy.

== Parks ==
=== Central Coast Regional District ===
#	Name	Established	Commons category	Picture	Coordinates
1	Codville Lagoon Marine Provincial Park				52.0611°N 127.842°W
2	Oliver Cove Marine Provincial Park	1992-09-16			52.312222222222°N 128.35527777778°W
3	Penrose Island Marine Provincial Park	1992			51.46111111°N 127.73333333°W
4	Sir Alexander Mackenzie Provincial Park	1926-02-10	First Crossing of North America National Historic Site		52.38333333°N 127.46666667°W

=== Kitimat-Stikine Regional District ===
#	Name	Established	Image	Coordinates
1	Bear Glacier Provincial Park	2000-05-11		56.1°N 129.667°W
2	Border Lake Provincial Park			56.3542°N 130.714°W
3	Bulkley Junction Provincial Park			55.2417°N 127.683°W
4	Dala-Kildala Rivers Estuaries Provincial Park			53.835°N 128.504°W
5	Exchamsiks River Provincial Park	1956-03-16		54.335833333333°N 129.29611111111°W
6	Foch-Gilttoyees Provincial Park			53.877°N 129.139°W
7	Gitnadoiks River Provincial Park	1986-12-10		54.166666666667°N 129.16666666667°W
8	Great Glacier Provincial Park	2001		56.8333°N 131.833°W
9	Green Inlet Marine Provincial Park	1992		52.9194°N 128.482°W
10	Hai Lake–Mount Herman Provincial Park	2004-05-17		54.416666666667°N 128.59583333333°W
11	Iskut River Hot Springs Provincial Park	2001		57.0838°N 130.361°W
12	Jackson Narrows Marine Provincial Park	1992		52.5264°N 128.3°W
13	Kinaskan Lake Provincial Park	1987		57.5°N 130.233°W
14	Kitimat River Provincial Park			54.111388888889°N 128.60888888889°W
15	Kitsumkalum Provincial Park	1947-11-25		54.721944444444°N 128.77111111111°W
16	Kitwanga Mountain Provincial Park	1997		55.1083°N 128.142°W
17	Kleanza Creek Provincial Park	1956-03-16		54.598611111111°N 128.39583333333°W
18	Lakelse Lake Provincial Park			54.3833°N 128.517°W
19	Lakelse Lake Wetlands Provincial Park			54.336111111111°N 128.58611111111°W
20	Lava Forks Provincial Park	2001		56.45°N 130.9°W
21	Lower Skeena River Provincial Park	2004-05-17		54.3°N 129.344°W
22	Meziadin Lake Provincial Park	1987		56.068°N 129.279°W
23	Mount Edziza Provincial Park	1972		57.5831°N 130.667°W
24	Nalbeelah Creek Wetlands Provincial Park	2004-05-17		54.144444444444°N 128.57638888889°W
25	Ningunsaw Provincial Park			56.838888888889°N 130.09444444444°W
26	Nisga'a Memorial Lava Bed Provincial Park	1992		55.1167°N 128.867°W
27	Owyacumish River Provincial Park	2004		53.531666666667°N 128.435°W
28	Ross Lake Provincial Park			55.2667°N 127.517°W
29	Seeley Lake Provincial Park	1956-03-16		55.2°N 127.683°W
30	Seven Sisters Provincial Park			54.955555555556°N 128.01305555556°W
31	Seven Sisters Provincial Park and Protected Area	2000-06-29		54.9667°N 128.15°W
32	Sleeping Beauty Mountain Provincial Park	2004		54.591944444444°N 128.76916666667°W
33	Sue Channel Provincial Park	2004		53.727222222222°N 128.84888888889°W
34	Swan Lake Kispiox River Provincial Park	1996		55.9°N 128.583°W
35	Tarahne Provincial Park	1974-05-02		59.578055555556°N 133.70555555556°W

=== North Coast Regional District ===
#	Name	Established	Commons category	Picture	Coordinates
1	Diana Lake Provincial Park	1980			54.228°N 130.163°W
2	Kennedy Island Conservancy	June 27, 2008	Kennedy Island Conservancy		54°02′10″N 130°11′15″W
3	Khutzeymateen Grizzly Bear Sanctuary	1994			54.628°N 129.783°W
4	Kitson Island Marine Provincial Park				54.179166666667°N 130.31694444444°W
5	Klewnuggit Inlet Marine Provincial Park	1993-06-14			53.6858°N 129.702°W
6	Lowe Inlet Marine Provincial Park		Lowe Inlet Marine Provincial Park		53.556388888889°N 129.5875°W
7	Naikoon Provincial Park	1973			53.84°N 131.9°W
8	Prudhomme Lake Provincial Park	June 1, 1964	Prudhomme Lake Provincial Park		54.241°N 130.132°W
9	Pure Lake Provincial Park	1981			53.867222°N 132.085°W
10	Union Passage Marine Provincial Park				53.4125°N 129.44166666667°W

=== Squamish-Lillooet Regional District ===
#	Name	Established	Commons category	Picture	Coordinates
1	Alice Lake Provincial Park	1956-11-23			49.7833°N 123.117°W
2	Big Creek Provincial Park				51.3°N 123.167°W
3	Birkenhead Lake Provincial Park	1963	Birkenhead Lake Provincial Park		50.5833°N 122.75°W
4	Blackcomb Glacier Provincial Park				50.0917°N 122.871°W
5	Brackendale Eagles Provincial Park				49.7667°N 123.175°W
6	Brandywine Falls Provincial Park	1973-01-18	Brandywine Falls Provincial Park		50.0353°N 123.119°W
7	Bridge River Delta Provincial Park				50.8264°N 123.205°W
8	Callaghan Lake Provincial Park	1997-07-23			50.2°N 123.183°W
9	Clendinning Provincial Park	1998			50.4167°N 123.733°W
10	Duffey Lake Provincial Park	1993	Duffey Lake Provincial Park		50.4042°N 122.342°W
11	Fred Antoine Provincial Park	2010			51.09°N 122.428°W
12	French Bar Creek Provincial Park	2010			51.225°N 122.204°W
13	Garibaldi Provincial Park	1920-04-29	Garibaldi Provincial Park		49.9167°N 122.75°W
14	Gwyneth Lake Provincial Park	2010			50.79°N 122.876°W
15	Joffre Lakes Provincial Park	1988-01-07	Joffre Lakes Provincial Park		50.3442°N 122.478°W
16	Murrin Provincial Park				49.6444°N 123.208°W
17	Nairn Falls Provincial Park	1966-04-04			50.2937°N 122.819°W
18	Porteau Cove Provincial Park	1981	Porteau Cove Provincial Park		49.5572°N 123.236°W
19	Seton Portage Historic Provincial Park	1972-03-29			50.7063°N 122.293°W
20	Shannon Falls Provincial Park	1984	Shannon Falls		49.6694°N 123.156°W
21	South Chilcotin Mountains Provincial Park	2010			51.0333°N 123.067°W
22	Spruce Lake Protected Area				51.0639°N 123.036°W
23	Stawamus Chief Provincial Park	1997			49.682°N 123.1403°W
24	Tantalus Provincial Park				49.8417°N 123.283°W
25	Tetrahedron Provincial Park				49.6°N 123.583°W
26	Upper Lillooet Provincial Park	1997-07-23			50.683333333333°N 123.61666666667°W
27	Yalakom Provincial Park				51.09°N 122.428°W

=== Sunshine Coast Regional District ===
#	Name	Established	Commons category	Picture	Coordinates
1	Buccaneer Bay Provincial Park				49.4944°N 123.99°W
2	Francis Point Provincial Park	2004			49.61°N 124.05722222°W
3	Garden Bay Marine Provincial Park				49.6333°N 124°W
4	Halkett Bay Provincial Park	1988-06-16			49.4514°N 123.327°W
5	Hardy Island Marine Provincial Park				49.728333333333°N 124.21611111111°W
6	Harmony Islands Marine Provincial Park	1992			49.8625°N 124.012°W
7	Mount Elphinstone Provincial Park	2000			49.4328°N 123.6128°W
8	Mount Richardson Provincial Park	1999-06-28			49.568055555556°N 123.76111111111°W
9	Musket Island Marine Provincial Park	1992			49.726388888889°N 124.2125°W
10	Plumper Cove Marine Provincial Park	1955			49.40451°N 123.465116°W
11	Porpoise Bay Provincial Park	1971			49.5067°N 123.747°W
12	Princess Louisa Marine Provincial Park				50.2056°N 123.77°W
13	Roberts Creek Provincial Park				49.4417°N 123.6723°W
14	Sargeant Bay Provincial Park	1990			49.4792°N 123.867°W
15	Sechelt Inlets Marine Provincial Park	1980			49.63333333°N 123.8°W
16	Simson Marine Provincial Park	1986			49.4875°N 123.96527777778°W
17	Skookumchuck Narrows Provincial Park				49.73861111°N 123.90805556°W
18	Smuggler Cove Marine Provincial Park	1971			49.516388888889°N 123.9575°W
19	Spipiyus Provincial Park	1999			49.6425°N 123.892°W
