= Ross Lake =

Ross Lake or Lake Ross may refer to:

== Australia ==
- Lake Ross (Queensland), a reservoir in City of Townsville, Queensland

== Canada ==
- Ross Lake Provincial Park, in British Columbia

== Ireland ==
- Ross Lake (Ireland), a lake in County Galway

== New Zealand ==
- Lake Ross (New Zealand)

== United States ==
- Ross Lake (Maine)
- Ross Lake (Crow Wing County, Minnesota)
- Ross Lake Township, Crow Wing County, Minnesota
- Ross Lake (Ohio), a reservoir in Ross County
- Ross Lake (Washington), a reservoir in Washington state and British Columbia
- Ross Lake (Wood County, Wisconsin)
