= Lakelse River =

River in British Columbia

Lakelse River Copper River
- Mouth of the Lakelse River

Location
- Country: Canada
- Province: British Columbia
- District: Range 5 Coast Land District

Physical characteristics
- Source: Lakelse Lake
  - location: Kitimat Ranges
  - coordinates: 54°22′41″N 128°33′36″W
  - elevation: 76 m (249 ft)
- Mouth: Skeena River
  - location: Southwest of Terrace, British Columbia
  - coordinates: 54°26′33″N 128°46′52″W
  - elevation: 43 m (141 ft)
- Length: 24 km (15 mi)
- Basin size: 583 km^{2} (225 sq mi),
- Discharge
  - average: 27.5 m^{3}/s (970 cu ft/s)

Basin features
- Tributaries
  - left: Coldwater Creek, White Creek
  - right: Herman Creek
- Topo map: NTS103I7 Lakelse Lake

The Lakelse River (la-KELS) is a tributary of the Skeena River in northwestern part of the province of British Columbia, Canada. From its source in Lakelse Lake, in the Kitimat Ranges of the Coast Mountains, the Lakelse River flows northwest for about 24 km (15 mi) to empty into the Skeena River about 12 km (7.5 mi) southwest of Terrace, British Columbia.

The Lakelse River's drainage basin covers 583 km^{2} (225 sq mi). The river's mean annual discharge is estimated at 27.5 m^{3}/s (970 cu ft/s). The Lakelse watershed's land cover is classified as 53.5% conifer forest, 12.9% shrubland, 11.8 barren, and small amounts of other cover. The mouth of the Lakelse River is located about 12 km (7.5 mi) southwest of Terrace, British Columbia, about 45 km (28 mi) north of Kitimat, about 100 km (62 mi) east of Prince Rupert, British Columbia, and about 395 km (245 mi) west of Prince George, British Columbia.

The Lakelse River watershed lies within the traditional territory of the Tsimshian Kitselas people. As of 2025 the Kitselas First Nation and the Kitsumkalum First Nation are in the process of finalizing a treaty with the government of British Columbia. By the terms of the treaty agreement the Kitselas will receive several land parcels in the Lakelse watershed.

The name "Lakelse" comes from a Tsimshianic word meaning "fresh water mussel".

== Geography ==
The Lakelse River originates in Lakelse Lake and flows northwest for about 24 km (15 mi) to empty into the Skeena River. Over half of the river's watershed area and streamflow comes from tributaries to Lakelse Lake. The longest and largest of these tributaries is Williams Creek, which is about 45 km (28 mi) long.

Lakelse Lake lies in the Kitimat-Kitsumkalum Valley, also called the Kalum-Kitimat Valley or Trough, about 15 km (9.3 mi) south of Terrace and about 37 km (23 mi) north of Kitimat. The two are linked by British Columbia Highway 37 (known as the Kitimat Highway between Kitimat and Terrace), a Canadian National Railway railway line, and other linear developments like pipelines and electrical transmission lines. The Kitimat-Kitsumkalum Valley, glacially-made and today occupied by the Kitimat River, Lakelse River, and the Kitsumkalum River, is one of the few relatively flat areas connecting the coast of British Columbia to the interior. This has been a motivating factor in the development of a port at Kitimat and infrastructure projects connecting it to the rest of Canada.

Lakelse Lake is about 14.5 km^{2} (5.6 sq mi) large. Its maximum depth is 32 m (105 ft) but most of it is relatively shallow. It is one of the warmest lakes in northern British Columbia. There are a number of hot springs with temperatures up to 85 °C (185 °F) on eastern side of the lake, including Lakelse Hot Springs. For a few centuries at the end of the Last Glacial Period, about 10,000 years ago, the Lakelse Valley was occupied by the sea, up to about 700 m (2,300 ft) deep.

Kitimat is the site of a liquefied natural gas port terminal project named LNG Canada, which is coupled with the Coastal GasLink Pipeline, linking this terminal to the Montney, British Columbia, natural gas field.

There are several protected areas in the Lakelse River watershed, including the provincial parks Hai Lake–Mount Herman Provincial Park, Lakelse Lake Provincial Park, and Lakelse Lake Wetlands Provincial Park. Along upper Williams Creek there is the Williams Creek Ecological Reserve.

== Tributaries ==
The tributaries of Lakelse River are listed below in upstream order, with the basin size and discharge given for each:

- Lakelse River (583 km², 27.5 m³/s)
  - White Creek (35.2 km², 1.66 m³/s)
  - Coldwater Creek (92.6 km², 4.75 m³/s)
    - Chris Creek (6.5 km², 0.39 m³/s)
  - Herman Creek (6.8 km², 0.21 m³/s)
  - Lakelse Lake (383 km², 18.9 m³/s)
    - Ena Creek (2.06 km², 0.07 m³/s)
    - Andalas Creek (16.0 km², 0.576 m³/s)
    - Clearwater Creek (15.1 km², 0.565 m³/s)
    - Schulbuckhand Creek (33.4 km², 1.88 m³/s)
    - Hatchery Creek (32.6 km², 1.83 m³/s)
    - Furlong Creek (11.4 km², 0.53 m³/s)
    - Williams Creek (207 km², 11.4 m³/s)
      - Sockeye Creek (31.1 km², 1.25 m³/s)

The longest and largest tributary emptying into Lakelse Lake is Williams Creek, which flows from the north side of Chist Peak about 45 km (28 mi) to Lakelse Lake.

== History ==
In pre-contact times the Lakelse watershed was occupied by Gitlutzau (also called Killutsal), considered part of the Tsimshian Kitselas people. The Haisla people occupied the flatlands south of Lakelse Lake. Gitlutzau was an important settlement located on the east bank of the Lakelse River at the Lakelse–Skeena confluence. Three other historic documented villages include Lakgeas, a village on the Lakelse River, a summer fishing village near the outlet of Lakelse Lake, and a fishing village at the mouth of Herman Creek.

== Flora and fauna ==
The primary biogeoclimatic zone of the Lakelse watershed is "Coastal Western Hemlock (CWH) zone, merging into the "Mountain Hemlock" (MH) zone at higher altitudes. Historically the watershed's vegetation was dominated by old growth conifer temperate rainforest of western hemlock, western red cedar, and amabilis fir. Sitka spruce is common but not dominant. The mountain hemlock zone is characterized by the presence of mountain hemlock and the absence of red cedar.

The Lakelse watershed has a very high fisheries value and is a major producer of sockeye, coho, and pink salmon, fished both recreationally and commercially. Steelhead and cutthroat trout runs support a major sport fishery. Resident fish species include rainbow trout, Dolly Varden trout, mountain whitefish, prickly sculpin, largescale suckers, redside shiners, northern pikeminnow, peamouth chub, and three-spined stickleback.

Chinook salmon are present but in relatively low numbers. Chum salmon runs are modest. The sockeye salmon runs are among the largest in the Skeena River watershed, although sockeye spawning population has declined, rebounded, and declined again since the 1950s. A Lakelse Sockeye Recovery Process plan was initiated in 2003.

== See also ==
- List of rivers of British Columbia
