= Sugar Lake =

Sugar Lake may refer to:

- Sugar Lake (Aitkin County, Minnesota)
- Sugar Lake (British Columbia), a lake in the upper Shuswap River basin, British Columbia, Canada
- Codville Lagoon Marine Provincial Park, formerly Sugar Lake Provincial Park, British Columbia
- Sugar Lake, a lake in Manchester Township, Freeborn County, Minnesota, United States
- Sugar Lake Division, one of the two land divisions comprising Erie National Wildlife Refuge, Pennsylvania, United States
- Sugar Lake, an alternative name for Lewis and Clark Lake in the Lewis and Clark State Park in Missouri
