= Zymagotitz River =

Tributary of the Skeena River, BC, Canada

- Mouth of Zymagotitz River

Location
- Country: Canada
- Province: British Columbia

Physical characteristics
- Source: Kitimat Ranges
  - location: Coast Mountains
  - coordinates: 54°36′46″N 129°5′17″W
  - elevation: 765 m (2,510 ft)
- Mouth: Skeena River
  - coordinates: 54°28′57″N 128°44′4″W
  - elevation: 45 m (148 ft)
- Length: 45 km (28 mi)
- Basin size: 389 km^{2} (150 sq mi),
- Discharge
  - average: 24.2 m^{3}/s (850 cu ft/s)

The Zymagotitz River is a tributary of the Skeena River located in the North Coast Regional District of the province of British Columbia, Canada. It originates in the Kitimat Ranges of the Coast Mountains, and flows south and west about 45 km (28 mi) to the Skeena River, about 10 km (6.2 mi) downriver from Terrace and about 100 km (62 mi) east of Prince Rupert.

Its watershed covers 389 km^{2} (150 sq mi), and its mean annual discharge is 24.2 m^{3}/s (850 cu ft/s).

The Zymagotitz River's watershed is within the traditional territory of the Tsimshian Kitsumkalum people. As of 2025, part of the watershed is under negotiation for aboriginal title according to the British Columbia Treaty Process, under which the Kitsumkalum First Nation is in the fifth of six stages.

== Geography ==
The Zymagotitz River originates in high, glaciated peaks of the Kitimat Range, such as Mount William Brown, Mount Morris, Mount Kenney, Alice Peak, Mount Treston, Mount Remo, and Sleeping Beauty Mountain. The river flows south, passing by passing by Kitsumkalum Mountain, to the Skeena River, collecting a number of tributary streams including Erlandsen Creek and Molybdenum Creek.

Sleeping Beauty Mountain Provincial Park is located within the Zymagotitz River's watershed, as is part of Kitsumkalum Provincial Park.

The Zymagotitz River's watershed's land cover is classified as 37.7% Coniferous, 25.1% Barren, 14.8% Snow/Glacier, 9.9% Herb, and 8.1% Shrub.

The Indian reserve Zimagord 3, of the Kitsumkalum First Nation, is located near the mouth of the Zymagotitz River.

The river was previously called the Zimacord.

== Natural history ==
The Zymagotitz River supports of runs of salmonids including Chinook salmon, chum salmon, coho salmon, pink salmon, and steelhead trout. Much of the Zymagotitz River's watershed has been subject to logging since the 1950s, including extensive clearcutting starting in the 1970s.

== See also ==
- List of rivers of British Columbia
