= Nelson Island (British Columbia) =

Island in British Columbia, Canada

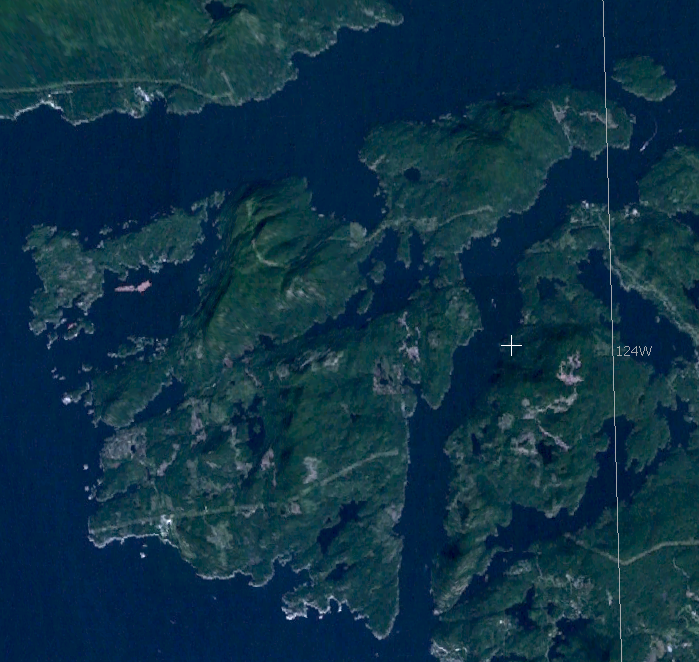
- Interactive map of Nelson Island

Geography
- Location: Strait of Georgia
- Coordinates: 49°42′00″N 124°08′00″W
- Archipelago: Northern Gulf Islands
- Area: 102.8 km^{2} (39.7 sq mi)

Administration
- Canada
- Province: British Columbia

Nelson Island is an island in the Sunshine Coast region of the South Coast region of British Columbia. It is surrounded by Hotham Sound, Agamemnon Channel, and Malaspina Strait. The closest communities are Pender Harbour, British Columbia and Egmont, both on the Sechelt Peninsula.

The island is mostly forested, although there are some clear cut areas inland. Lakes and large mountainous hills define the geography. Hardy Island sits alongside Nelson Island with Blind Bay in between the two. Logging operations and granite quarries were early features of the island, and many buildings in BC were built out of Nelson Granite including the Parliament Buildings in Victoria.

There were once a few homesteads and small logging operations, most of which are now summer cabins. As a consequence, the permanent population is quite small. One of the most well known residents was Harry Roberts, who retired to the island in 1929. The house he built, Sunray, was a cottage with south-facing walls of glass the stretched out like the rays of a sun. It still stands in a cove at Cape Cockburn.

The island is named for the British naval hero, Horatio Nelson, 1st Viscount Nelson. The adjacent island of Hardy Island is named after his Commodore, who was the last man to whom Nelson spoke as he lay dying after the Battle of Trafalgar. The eastern side of Nelson Island is bordered by Agamemnon Channel, named after Nelson's first command and favourite ship, HMS Agamemnon. The southernmost part of the island is Fearney Point, named after Nelson's bargeman William Fearney who took charge of the swords of surrendered Spaniards during the Battle of Cape St Vincent. The scene is commemorated on a bas-relief plaque at the foot of Nelson's Column in Trafalgar Square, London.
