= Perdomo =

Perdomo may refer to:

- Perdomo (surname)
- Perdomo (cigar brand), a brand of cigars produced by Tabacalera Perdomo
- Perdomo (TransMilenio), a railway station in Bogota, Colombia

== See also ==
- Prudhomme (disambiguation)
