= Foch-Gilttoyees Provincial Park =

Provincial park in British Columbia, Canada

- IUCN category II (national park)
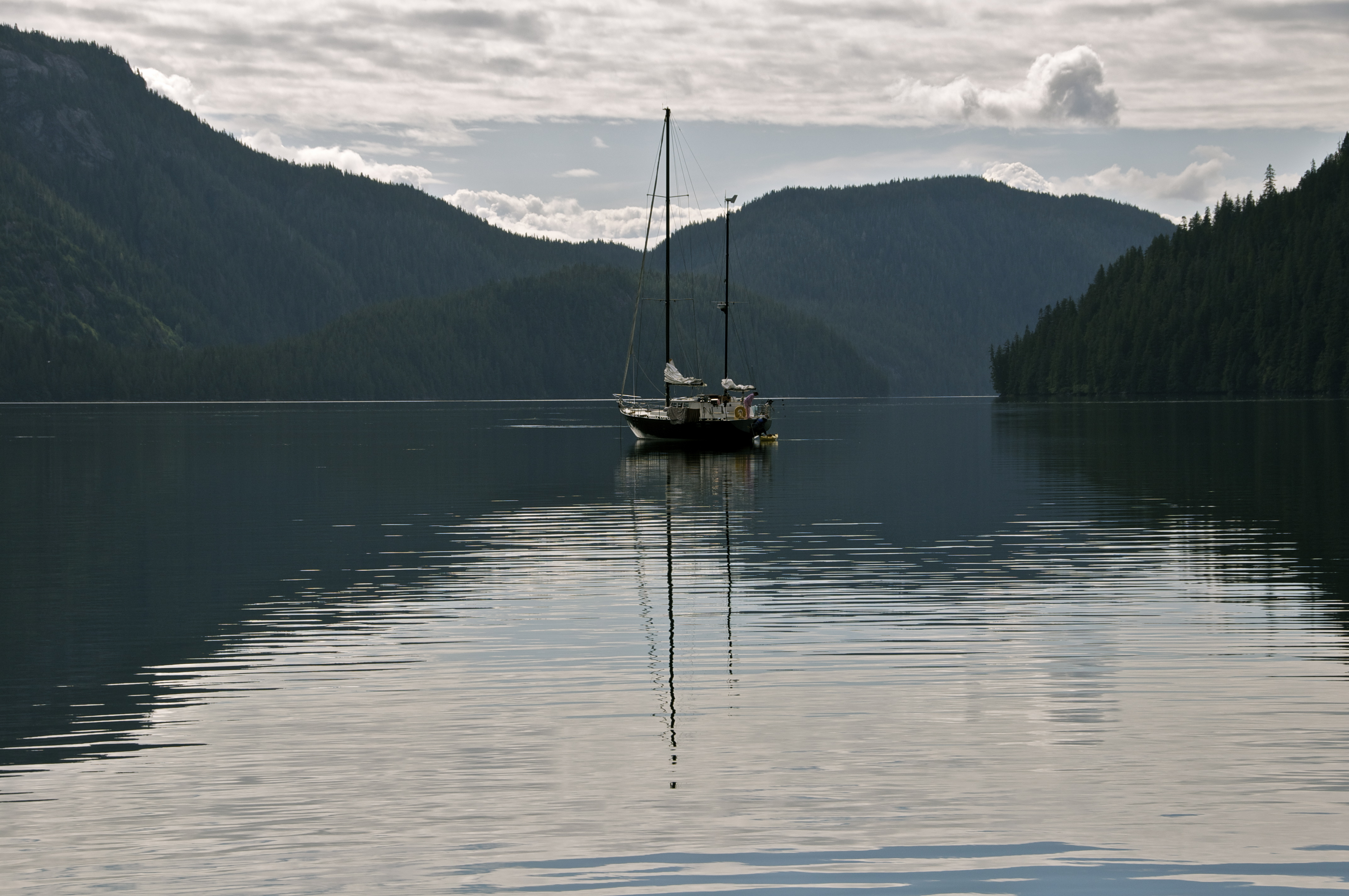

- Location within British Columbia
- Interactive map of Foch-Gilttoyees Provincial Park
- Location: British Columbia, Canada
- Nearest city: Kitimat
- Coordinates: 53°52′59″N 129°07′00″W
- Area: 61,089 ha (150,950 acres)
- Designated: May 20, 2004
- Governing body: BC Parks
- Website: Foch-Gilttoyees Provincial Park

Foch-Gilttoyees Provincial Park is a provincial park in British Columbia, Canada. The park and protected area encompasses 61,089 hectares (150,950 acres) of coastal terrain from sea level up to alpine. The park contains part of the historical First Nations travel path between the Skeena River and the Douglas Channel. The remainder of the route is located in Gitnadoiks River Provincial Park. Together, the two parks provide a continuous protected corridor between the river and the channel.
