= Prudhomme (surname) =

Prudhomme or Prud'homme (sometimes anglicised to Pruden) is a surname of French origin. The surname spread to the Canary Islands where it was Hispanicized to Perdomo. The surname spread to New Spain and is now common in Colombia, Venezuela, Cuba and Honduras.

== Etymology ==
The name is derived from the French term prud'homme.

== People ==
- Alex Prud'homme (born 1961), American nonfiction writer and journalist
- Arthur Prud'Homme (1898–1978), Canadian boxer
- Christian Prudhomme (born 1960), French sports journalist and general director of the Tour de France
- Don Prudhomme (born 1941), American dragster racer
- Donna Prudhomme (died 1991), murder victim found in the Texas Killing Fields
- Emilio Prud'Homme (1856–1932), lyricist of the Dominican national anthem
- Eustache Prud'homme (1818–1891), French-Canadian political figure
- Louis-Marie Prudhomme (1752–1830), French journalist
- Marcel Prud'homme (1934–2017), French-Canadian politician
- Michel Preud'homme (born 1959), Belgian football goalkeeper
- Paul Prudhomme (1940–2015), American celebrity chef
- Sully Prudhomme (1839–1907), French poet, essayist and Nobel laureate in Literature

== Fictional characters ==
- M. and Mme. Joseph Prudhomme, 19th-century cartoon characters created by Henri Monnier

== See also ==
- Prudhomme (disambiguation)
