= Perdomo (surname) =

Perdomo, is a Canary Islander noble family name originally from Normandy, France. The surname Perdomo is a Spanish version of the French surname Prudhomme, and is closely associated with the Bethencourt family of France. "Prudhomme" was a French term meaning a good or wise man used in the Middle Ages to designate local magistrates.

== Origins ==
On May 1, 1402, Jean de Arriete left the port of La Rochelle, France with French explorer Jean de Béthencourt for the conquest of the Canary Islands. After subduing the native population, Arriete was given the title Governor Magistrate of Lanzarote by the new King of the Canary Islands, Jean IV Béthencourt. It was at this time that he hispanicized his name to Juan Arriete Perdomo.

Perdomo would eventually marry Princess Margarita Leonor de Béthencourt, daughter of King Maciot de Béthencourt (nephew and heir to the aforementioned Jean IV Béthencourt) and Princess Maria de Teguise (daughter of the last indigenous king of Lanzarote - Guadarfia).

Juan Perdomo, son of Jean Arriete Perdomo and Margarita Leonor de Béthencourt would assist in the conquest of Gran Canaria and Tenerife. Through him the family name would eventually spread to the new world.

== Notable people ==
- Alexis Vila Perdomo, Cuban mixed martial artist
- Ángel Perdomo, Dominican baseball pitcher
- Carlos Perdomo, Belizean politician
- Cesar Perdomo, Venezuelan baseball pitcher
- Chance Perdomo (1996–2024), American and British actor
- Claudio Roberto Perdomo (born 1964), Honduran politician
- Eneas Perdomo (1930–2011), Venezuelan singer
- Fernando Perdomo (born 1980), American musician
- Fernando Araújo Perdomo (born 1955), Colombian politician
- Geraldo Perdomo (born 1999), Dominican baseball player
- José Perdomo (born 1965), Uruguayan footballer
- Josefa Antonia Perdomo y Heredia (1834–1896), Dominican poet
- Luciano Perdomo (born 1996), Argentine footballer
- Luis Perdomo (baseball, born 1984), Dominican baseball pitcher
- Luis Perdomo (baseball, born 1993), Dominican baseball pitcher
- Luis Perdomo (pianist) (born 1971), American jazz pianist and composer
- Óscar Berger Perdomo (born 1946), Guatemalan politician
- Oscar F. Perdomo (1919-1976), American military pilot
- Richard Perdomo (born 1985), American soccer player
- Ismael Perdomo Borrero, Colombian Archbishop
- Willie Perdomo, American poet

== See also ==
- Prud'homme, French variant
