= Prudhomme =

Prudhomme or Prud'homme may refer to:

- Prudhomme (surname), a surname of French origin. The surname derives from the Old French prud'homme, meaning a wise, honest or sensible man.
- Prud'homme, Saskatchewan, a Canadian village
- Prudhomme Lake Provincial Park, in British Columbia, Canada
- Fort Prudhomme, a French fortification in Tennessee
- Narcisse Prudhomme Plantation in Bermuda, Louisiana

== See also ==
- Perdomo (disambiguation), Spanish variant
- Prod'homme, a French automobile manufactured 1907 to 1908
