= Alice Lake Provincial Park =

Provincial park in British Columbia, Canada

- IUCN category II (national park)
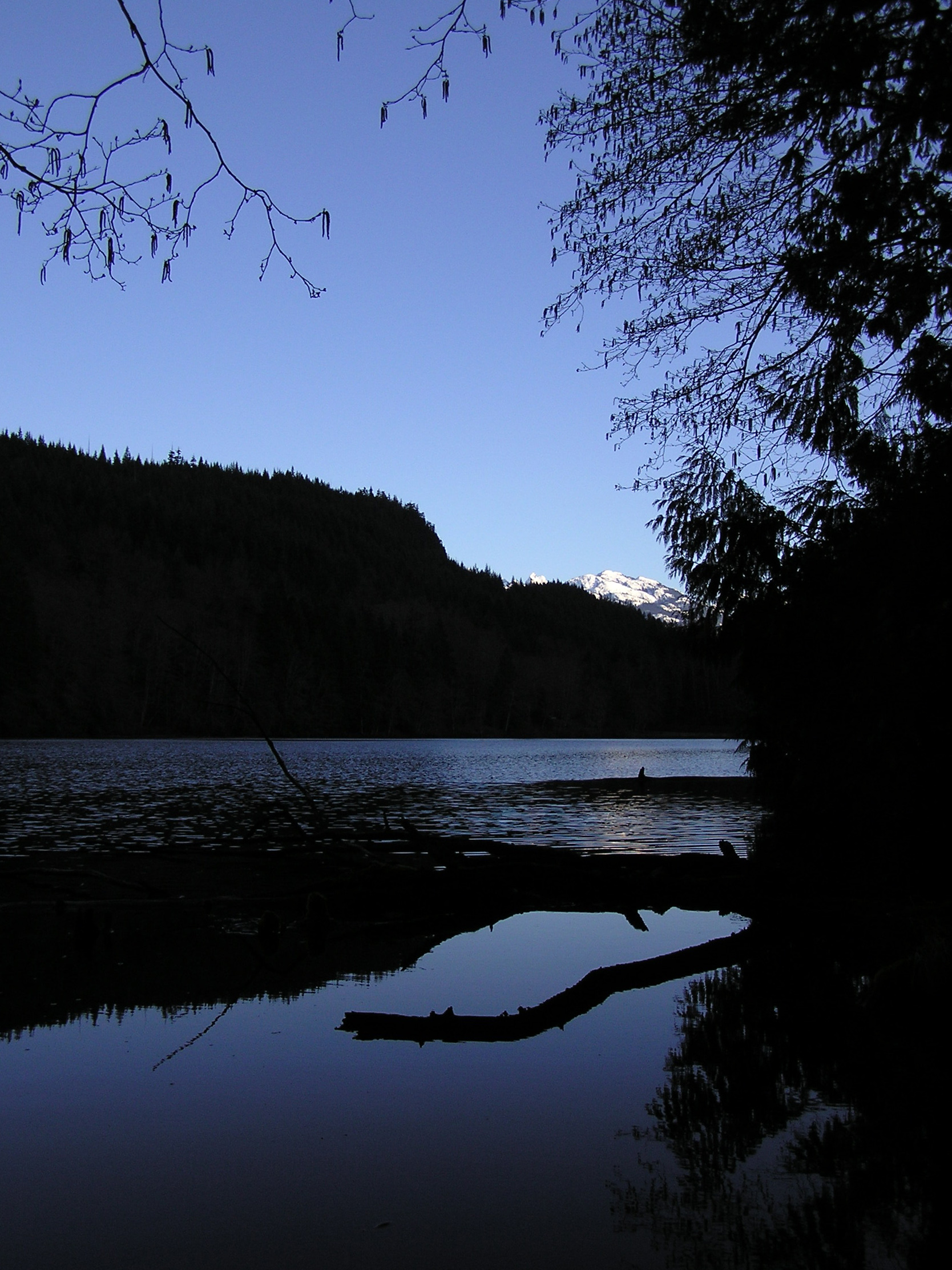
- Alice Lake at twilight

- Location within British Columbia
- Interactive map of Alice Lake Provincial Park
- Location: Squamish, British Columbia, Canada
- Nearest city: Squamish, British Columbia
- Coordinates: 49°46′59″N 123°07′00″W
- Area: 411 ha (1,020 acres)
- Established: November 23, 1956
- Governing body: BC Parks
- Website: bcparks.ca/alice-lake-park/

Alice Lake Provincial Park is a provincial park in British Columbia, Canada.

== History ==
Alice Lake is named for the wife of Charles Rose, who settled in the district about 1888. Although the area was used for logging from the 1880s until the 1920s, Alice Lake and the surrounding area has been a popular recreation destination since the area was settled. The park was established on November 23, 1956, and was expanded on February 14, 1961, to cover 396 ha. It was again expanded on October 20, 2009, with an additional 15 ha to increase the park to its current size of 411 ha.

== Geography ==
Alice Lake Provincial Park is home to four freshwater lakes, those being Alice, Edith, Fawn, and Stump Lakes. The park also hosts a large hill, DeBeck's Hill, that offers views of the Tantalus Range and Mt. Garibaldi.

== Ecology ==
The park is home to a number of mammal species, including squirrels, chipmunks, and raccoons. Bird species that call the park home include Stellar's jays, crows, ravens, ospreys, and great blue herons. Although not inside the park, the Brackendale bald eagle colony is very close to Alice Lake and eagles from there can often be seen in the park. Marine life in and around the lakes include introduced red-eared slider turtles, and native rainbow, Dolly Varden, and cutthroat trout. Trees include Douglas fir, cedar, and hemlock.

== Recreation ==
The park's namesake, Alice Lake, is popular as a swimming spot, as it boasts two beaches and a nearby campground with showers and electricity. There are many trails crossing the park for hiking and mountain biking that connect more broadly to the regional trail network. DeBeck's Hill is a popular trail for its views of the park, the Squamish River and the surrounding area. Canoeing and fishing are permitted on all four lakes. The park also offers interpretation and education programs for visitors.
