= Gitnadoix River =

- Mouth of Gitnadoix River

Location
- Country: Canada
- Province: British Columbia

Physical characteristics
- Source: Kitimat Ranges
  - location: Coast Mountains
  - coordinates: 54°2′35″N 129°13′20″W
  - elevation: 840 m (2,760 ft)
- Mouth: Skeena River
  - coordinates: 54°20′13″N 129°13′12″W
  - elevation: 15 m (49 ft)
- Length: 38 km (24 mi)
- Basin size: 546 km^{2} (211 sq mi)

The Gitnadoix River is a tributary of the Skeena River in the province of British Columbia, Canada. It originates in the Kitimat Ranges, and flows about 38 km (24 mi) north to the Skeena River, about 45 km (28 mi) west of Terrace.

The name "Gitnadoix" comes from a Tsimshian word meaning "people of the swift water". The Gitnadoix River watershed was home to the Tsimshian Gitnadoix First Nation, whose main village was located at the confluence of the Gitnadoix and Skeena Rivers. Today there are eight Tsimshian Lax-kw'alaams First Nation Indian reserves in the Gitnadoix River watershed, which represent some of the important fishery and homeplace locations.

Its drainage basin covers 546 km^{2} (211 sq mi) of mountainous, glaciated landscape, with peaks reaching heights of over 2,000 m (6,600 ft). The entire watershed is contained within Gitnadoiks River Provincial Park and Gitnadoiks River Protected Area. The Gitnadoix River's watershed has never been subjected to any kind of industrial development. Its protected status prohibits forestry, mineral, and hydroelectric development. There are no residences in the watershed. A natural gas pipeline corridor passes through the watershed about 400 m (1,300 ft) above the river's confluence with the Skeena. The main recreational activity is sport fishing, mainly for salmon, steelhead, Dolly Varden trout, and cutthroat trout.

== Course ==
The Gitnadoix River originates at an unnamed lake near Kadeen Mountain, south of Alastair Lake, in the Kitimat Ranges of the Coast Mountains. The river flows north, through Alastair Lake, east of Alastair Peak. Exiting the lake the Gitnadoix River continues north to the Skeena River. The Gitnadoix River collects many tributary streams flowing from the high, glaciated mountains of the region. The largest tributaries are Kadeen Creek, Magar Creek, Dogtag Creek, and Clay Creek, which contribute a significant portion of the Gitnadoix's flow.

The Gitnadoix River flows by the Indian reserves of Alastair 82, Alastair 81, Alastair 80, Tsemknawalqan 79, Iakwulgyiyaps 78, Psacelay 77, and at its mouth, Gitandoiks 76, and Gitandoiks 75, of the Tsimshian Lax-kw'alaams First Nation.

== History ==
The Gitnadoix River watershed was home to the Tsimshian Gitnadoix people, today part of the amalgamated Lax-kw'alaams First Nation. The river valley contains a number of village sites dating back to pre-contact times. In Indian Reserve 77 there was a historic village called Laxpse. Nearby is a late pre-contact village site, called Psacelay, which was used from about 1740 to the early 1800s.

== Natural history ==
The Gitnadoix Valley was a fjord that, since the end of the Pleistocene, has uplifted isostatically and filled with sediment. The floodplain that fills most of the valley bottom is about 1 km (0.62 mi) wide, through which the Gitnadoix meanders, often through multiple braided channels. The valley is U-shaped with steep sides, and avalanches annually sweep the slopes, often reaching the valley floor.

The forests of the Gitnadoix watershed's valleys and slopes up to about 600 m (2,000 ft) are dominated by western hemlock and Sitka spruce, with some stands of western red cedar. At higher altitudes the forest shifts to mountain hemlock and alpine vegetation. North of Alastair Lake the Gitnadoix Valley is swampy, with dispersed cottonwood and patchy conifer stands.

The Gitnadoix River is an important salmon spawning stream. It supports many species of fish, including sockeye salmon, coho salmon, chum salmon, Chinook salmon, pink salmon, steelhead trout, rainbow trout, cutthroat trout, Dolly Varden trout, mountain whitefish, bull trout, largescale sucker, peamouth chub, three-spined stickleback, and prickly sculpin.

Other wildlife living in the Gitnadoix's watershed include moose, beaver, otter, mink, wolf, mountain goat, a variety of waterfowl, shorebirds, eagles, hawks, hummingbirds, swallows, thrushes, crows, woodpeckers, warblers, and sparrows. Trumpeter swans nest in the watershed, which is one of just three confirmed nesting sites in British Columbia.

== See also ==
- List of rivers of British Columbia
