= Hardy Island =

Island of British Columbia, Canada

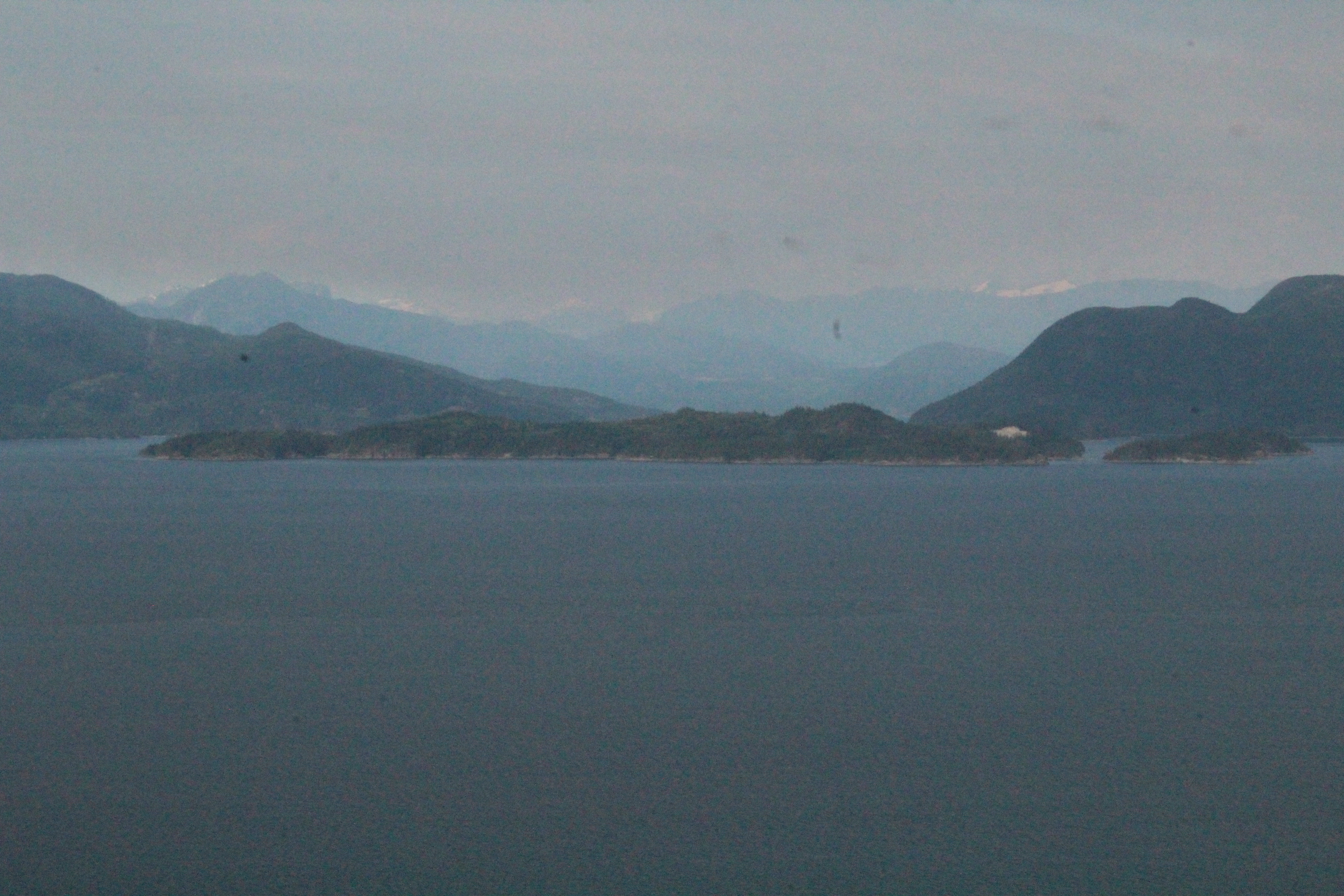
- Hardy Island viewed from the west

- Location within British Columbia

Geography
- Location: Sunshine Coast RD, British Columbia
- Coordinates: 49°44′31″N 124°11′51″W
- Archipelago: Northern Gulf Islands
- Area: 7.25 km^{2} (2.80 sq mi)

Hardy Island is an island of the Northern Gulf Islands archipelago located in the Sunshine Coast region of British Columbia.

== Etymology ==
Hardy Island was named for Sir Thomas Hardy, 1st Baronet who was captain of HMS Victory at the Battle of Trafalgar when Nelson died in his arms.

== Geography ==
The island is surrounded by Jervis Inlet to the north and west, Blind Bay to the east, and Malaspina Strait to the south. The northwestern corner of the island forms the eastern part of the outlet of Jervis Inlet as it empties into Malaspina Strait. The northeastern corner of the island lies no more than 0.25 km (0.16 mi) away from Nelson Island.

Blind Bay is an important anchorage for tugboats, tows and marine pleasure craft escaping the weather in Malaspina Strait.

The island is accessible via ferry or private watercraft.

== Attractions ==
Hardy Island Marine Provincial Park is located near the southern tip of the island.
