= Rosswood, British Columbia =

Rosswood
- Location of Rosswood in British Columbia
- Coordinates: 54°47′59″N 128°46′05″W
- Country: Canada
- Province: British Columbia
- Region: Skeena
- Regional district: Kitimat–Stikine
- Time zone: UTC−07:00 (PT)
- Area codes: 250, 778, 236, & 672
- Highways: Highway 113
- Waterways: Kitsumkalum River

Rosswood is a scattered community in the Skeena region of west central British Columbia, Canada. The place is at the northern tip of Kitsumkalum Lake. Being the meeting point of Kalum Lake Road and the Nisga'a Highway (BC Highway 113), the locality is by road about 39 kilometres (24 mi) north of Terrace.

== Earlier community ==
Annie Ross and her four children came to the area in 1909 and received a pre-emption at the mouth of Wesach Creek in 1912. She was a prospector, trapper, ran a stopping place, and was the inaugural postmaster 1912–1915. The post office closed in 1917, because World War I had drained the area of most of the predominantly male population.

Named in honor of Annie Ross, the first newspaper mention of Rosswood is 1913. The place had a telegraph station, the Dominion Telegraph line to Stewart having been installed through the locality in 1911. The lineman's cabin, built in 1919, is now located in the Terrace Heritage Park Museum.

During the inter-war period, hard-rock mining and placer mining dominated the local economy.

== Post-World War II ==
Logging developed during World War II, and the post-war expansion brought young families into the area. A one-room school existed 1957–1963. Access to Rosswood remained limited to the trail along the lake, or boat in summer, or over the ice in winter.

In 1971, Don Parmenter installed a pipe from a clear spring beside Dry Creek down to a large cottonwood tree beside Kalum Lake Road, just south of the store. The water eventually emerges from a hole drilled through a big cottonwood tree, creating what became known as either "The Water Tree" or "The Peeing Tree". Within months, people were bringing containers to collect the spring water. That year, a logging road was completed up the east side of the lake, which connected with the existing road from Terrace to the south end of the lake. The road, taken over by the province several years later, was paved in 1984.

High water in 1978 took out a bridge and moved a new home 46 metres (150 ft) off its foundations.

The present general store was opened in 1983, and the community hall was erected in the late 1980s.

Transmission lines were installed by BC Hydro in 1999 and by BC Tel in 2001. Prior to this, the general store and others relied upon radiotelephones.

The population numbers about 150 permanent residents. Kitsumkalum Provincial Park lies 10 minutes drive south.

== Maps ==
- Resources near Terrace map. 1925.
- "Standard Oil BC map". www.davidrumsey.com. 1937.
- "Shell BC map". www.davidrumsey.com. 1956.

== Climate ==
Climate data for RosswoodRosedale
Month	Jan	Feb	Mar	Apr	May	Jun	Jul	Aug	Sep	Oct	Nov	Dec	Year
Record high °C (°F)	12 (54)	11 (52)	15.5 (59.9)	25.6 (78.1)	34.5 (94.1)	32.5 (90.5)	35.5 (95.9)	37 (99)	32.2 (90.0)	22 (72)	13.3 (55.9)	9 (48)	37 (99)
Mean daily maximum °C (°F)	−1.5 (29.3)	2 (36)	6.9 (44.4)	12.1 (53.8)	16.3 (61.3)	19.6 (67.3)	21.9 (71.4)	22 (72)	16.9 (62.4)	9.8 (49.6)	2.6 (36.7)	−0.7 (30.7)	10.7 (51.3)
Mean daily minimum °C (°F)	−7.7 (18.1)	−5.4 (22.3)	−2.3 (27.9)	0.8 (33.4)	4.2 (39.6)	7.6 (45.7)	9.9 (49.8)	9.6 (49.3)	6.4 (43.5)	3 (37)	−2.6 (27.3)	−5.9 (21.4)	1.5 (34.7)
Record low °C (°F)	−32.2 (−26.0)	−26.1 (−15.0)	−21.7 (−7.1)	−8.3 (17.1)	−3.5 (25.7)	−1.5 (29.3)	2.5 (36.5)	−1.1 (30.0)	−3.5 (25.7)	−17.5 (0.5)	−28 (−18)	−31 (−24)	−32.2 (−26.0)
Average precipitation mm (inches)	124.3 (4.89)	77.6 (3.06)	46.3 (1.82)	37.9 (1.49)	47.3 (1.86)	53.3 (2.10)	55.5 (2.19)	58.1 (2.29)	107 (4.2)	175 (6.9)	136.5 (5.37)	131.7 (5.19)	1,050.4 (41.35)
Source: Environment Canada
