= Ross Lake Township, Crow Wing County, Minnesota =

Township in Minnesota, United States

Ross Lake Township
- Township
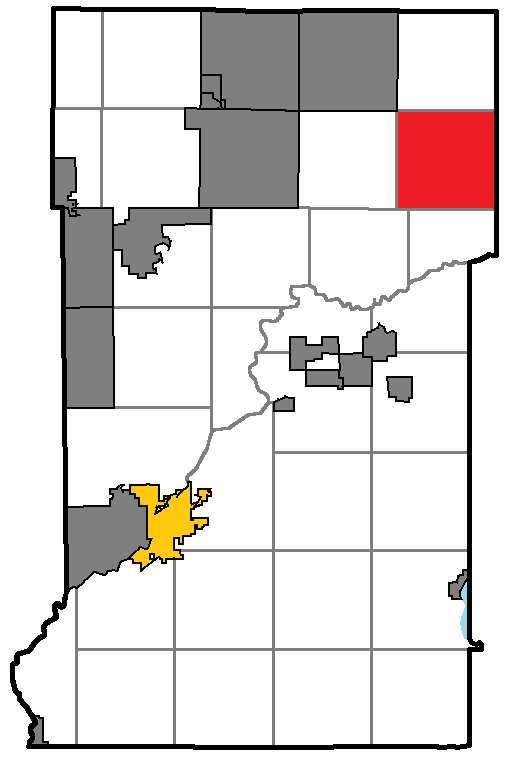
- Location of Ross Lake Township, within Crow Wing County, Minnesota
- Coordinates: 46°40′2″N 93°51′6″W
- Country: United States
- State: Minnesota
- County: Crow Wing

Area
  - Total: 36.2 sq mi (93.8 km^{2})
  - Land: 33.4 sq mi (86.4 km^{2})
  - Water: 2.9 sq mi (7.4 km^{2})
- Elevation: 1,306 ft (398 m)

Population (2020)
  - Total: 163
  - Density: 4.89/sq mi (1.89/km^{2})
- Time zone: UTC-6 (Central (CST))
  - Summer (DST): UTC-5 (CDT)
- FIPS code: 27-55978
- GNIS feature ID: 0665474
- Website: https://www.rosslaketownship.com/

Ross Lake Township is a township in Crow Wing County, Minnesota, United States. The population was 163 at the 2020 census. This township took its name from Ross Lake.

== Geography ==
According to the United States Census Bureau, the township has a total area of 36.2 square miles (93.8 km^{2}), of which 33.4 square miles (86.4 km^{2}) is land and 2.8 square miles (7.4 km^{2}) (7.87%) is water.

== Demographics ==
As of the census of 2000, there were 134 people, 69 households, and 44 families residing in the township. The population density was 4.0 people per square mile (1.6/km^{2}). There were 326 housing units at an average density of 9.8/sq mi (3.8/km^{2}). The racial makeup of the township was 97.76% White, 1.49% African American, and 0.75% from two or more races. Hispanic or Latino of any race were 0.75% of the population.

There were 69 households, out of which 10.1% had children under the age of 18 living with them, 60.9% were married couples living together, 1.4% had a female householder with no husband present, and 36.2% were non-families. 31.9% of all households were made up of individuals, and 15.9% had someone living alone who was 65 years of age or older. The average household size was 1.94 and the average family size was 2.41.

In the township the population was spread out, with 11.2% under the age of 18, 2.2% from 18 to 24, 18.7% from 25 to 44, 35.1% from 45 to 64, and 32.8% who were 65 years of age or older. The median age was 59 years. For every 100 females, there were 116.1 males. For every 100 females age 18 and over, there were 112.5 males.

The median income for a household in the township was $32,500, and the median income for a family was $38,438. Males had a median income of $31,875 versus $36,250 for females. The per capita income for the township was $15,906. There were no families and 2.7% of the population living below the poverty line, including no under eighteens and none of those over 64.
