= Harmony Islands Marine Provincial Park =

Provincial park in British Columbia, Canada

- IUCN category II (national park)
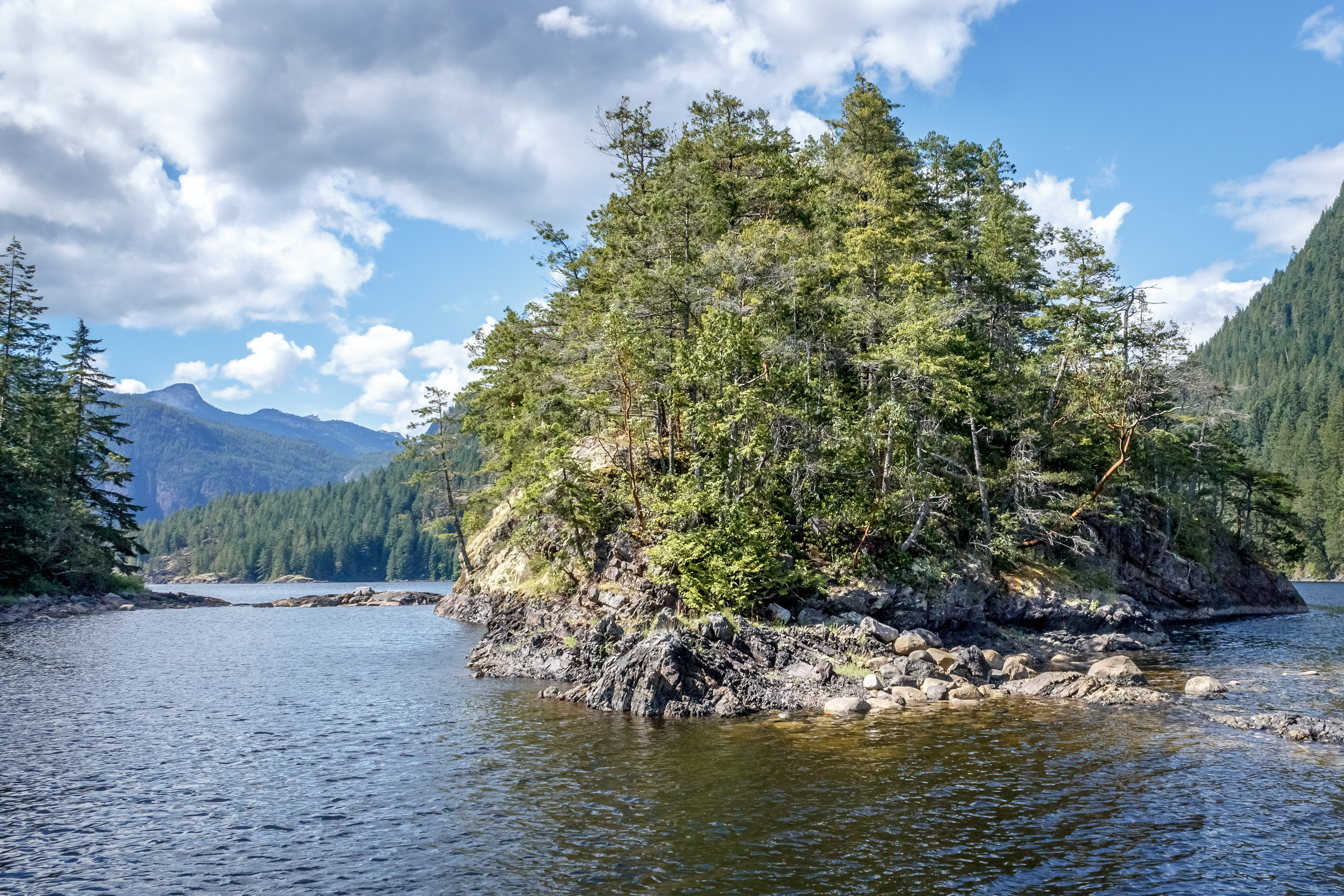
- Harmony Islands marine park

- Location within British Columbia
- Interactive map of Harmony Islands Marine Provincial Park
- Location: New Westminster Land District, British Columbia, Canada
- Nearest city: Powell River, BC
- Coordinates: 49°51′52″N 124°00′52″W
- Area: 43 ha (110 acres)
- Established: September 16, 1971
- Governing body: BC Parks

Harmony Islands Marine Provincial Park is a provincial park in British Columbia, Canada, located on the east side of Hotham Sound, which is a side-inlet of the lower reaches of Jervis Inlet, on that inlet's north side roughly opposite the mouth of Sechelt Inlet.
