= Pure Lake Provincial Park =

Canadian provincial park

- IUCN category II (national park)
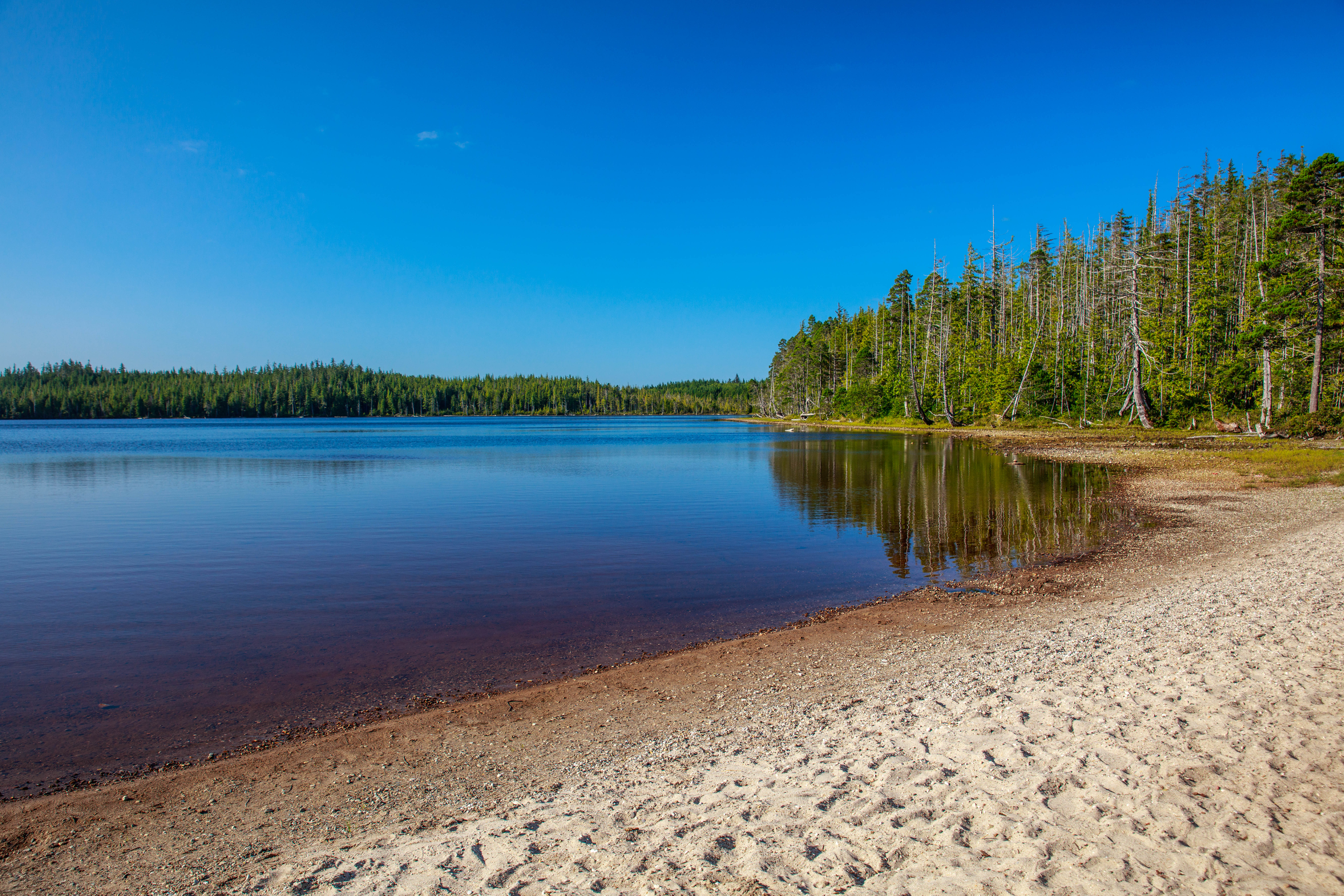
- Pure Lake, Haida Gwaii

- Location within British Columbia
- Interactive map of Pure Lake Provincial Park
- Location: North Coast RD, British Columbia
- Nearest city: Masset
- Coordinates: 53°52′02″N 132°05′06″W
- Area: 142 ha (350 acres)
- Created: 5 November 1981
- Governing body: BC Parks

Pure Lake Provincial Park is a provincial park in British Columbia, Canada. The 142 ha (350 acres) park surrounds and protects Pure Lake.

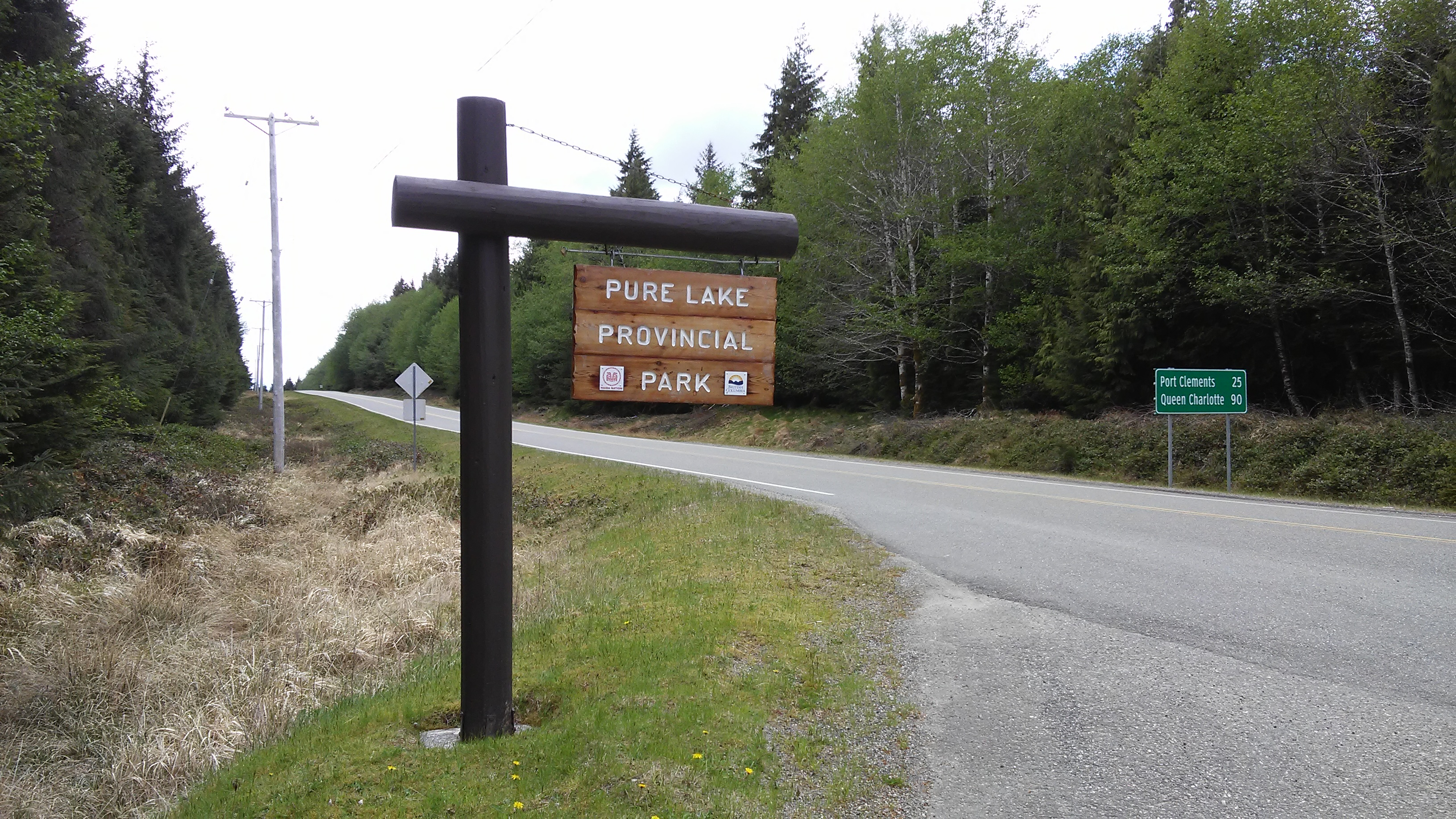
Park welcome sign

== See also ==
- Naikoon Provincial Park
