= Owyacumish River Provincial Park =

Provincial park in British Columbia, Canada

- IUCN category II (national park)
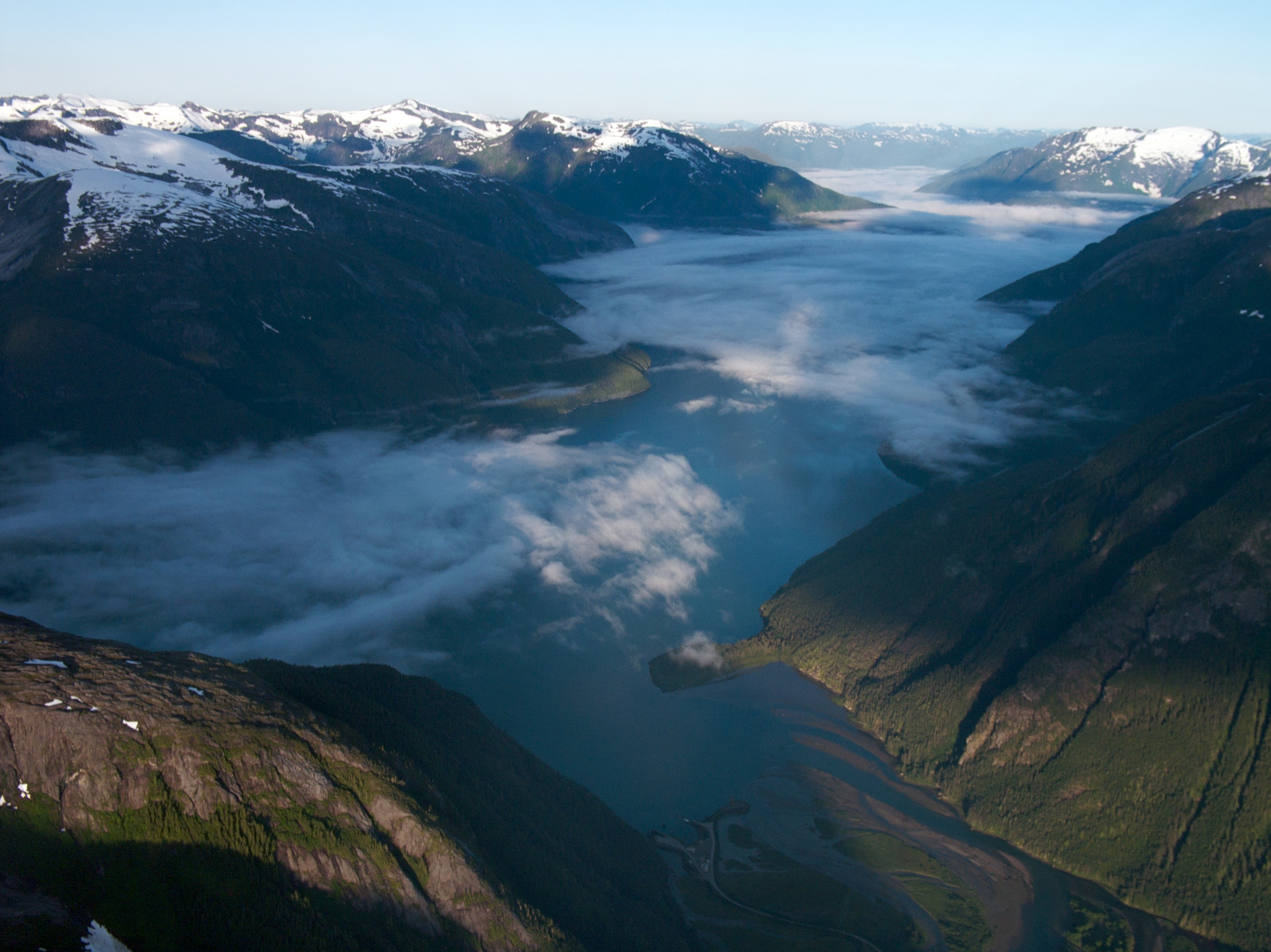
- Panoramic view

- Location within British Columbia
- Interactive map of Owyacumish River Provincial Park
- Location: British Columbia, Canada
- Nearest city: Kitimat
- Coordinates: 53°31′53″N 128°26′06″W
- Area: 8.05 km^{2} (3.11 sq mi)
- Established: May 17, 2004
- Governing body: BC Parks

Owyacumish River Provincial Park is a provincial park in British Columbia, Canada.

Owyacumish River Provincial Park lies to the north of the Gardner Canal. The park is some 15 km west of Kemano Bay. The Kitamaat Village is 70 km to the southeast. The village and the city of Kitimat are the nearest settlements from the park. Although the Owyacumish River is navigable by boat, motor-powered boats are not suitable for it.
