= Lakelse Lake Provincial Park =

Park in British Columbia, Canada

Lakelse Lake
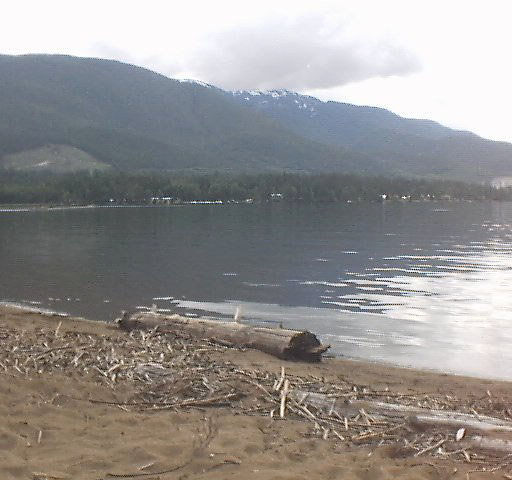

- Location within British Columbia
- Interactive map of Lakelse Lake
- Location: British Columbia
- Coordinates: 54°23′04″N 128°32′15″W
- Basin countries: Canada

Lakelse Lake Provincial Park is a provincial park in British Columbia, Canada, located just west of Highway 37 between Terrace and Kitimat. The name is derived from the Coast Tsimshian language word "LaxGyels" - "fresh water mussel", for the mollusk that is found on the bottom of both Lakelse Lake and Lakelse River. Before Lakelse Lake became a provincial park, Hatchery Creek, which runs throughout the park, was the site of a sockeye salmon hatchery operated by the Canadian Government between 1919 and 1936. Lakelse Lake Provincial Park was established on March 16, 1956.

The park is 3.54 km^{2} (875 acres) in size and is primarily used for camping, boating, canoeing, swimming and nature trail walking.

The nearby Lakelse Hot Springs are located just east of the lake. 54°21′00″N 128°32′00″W
