= Lakelse Hot Springs =

Thermal spring in British Columbia, Canada

- Interactive map of Lakelse Hot Springs
- Location: British Columbia, Canada
- Coordinates: 54°21′34″N 128°32′26″W
- Elevation: 75 m (246 ft)
- Type: Hot springs

The Lakelse Hot Springs, also known as the Mount Layton Hot Springs, are a group of hot springs in the Kalum-Kitimat valley of northern British Columbia, Canada, located 30 km (19 mi) south of Terrace along Highway 37 on the eastern shore of Lakelse Lake. With a maximum temperature of 89 °C, the springs are the hottest in Canada.

The formation of the Lakese Hot Springs is interpreted to be water seeping through hot rocks in faults of the fault-bounded Kalum-Kitimat valley. These faults may also have been the source for the Tseax Cone eruption 250 years ago.

== See also ==
- List of hot springs
- Volcanism of Canada
- Volcanism of Western Canada
