= Lower Skeena River Provincial Park =

Provincial park in British Columbia, Canada

- IUCN category III (natural monument or feature)
- Location within British Columbia
- Interactive map of Lower Skeena River Provincial Park
- Location: British Columbia, Canada
- Nearest city: Terrace, British Columbia
- Coordinates: 54°17′06″N 129°23′41″W
- Area: 582 hectares (1,440 acres)
- Governing body: BC Parks
- Website: Official website

Lower Skeena River Provincial Park is a provincial park in British Columbia, Canada.
