= Sargeant Bay Provincial Park =

Provincial park in British Columbia, Canada

- IUCN category II (national park)
- Location within British Columbia
- Interactive map of Sargeant Bay Provincial Park
- Location: British Columbia, Canada
- Nearest city: Sechelt
- Coordinates: 49°29′12″N 123°52′26″W
- Area: 146 ha (360 acres)
- Established: March 23, 1990
- Governing body: BC Parks

Sargeant Bay Provincial Park, is a provincial park in British Columbia, Canada, located just west of the community of Sechelt on the southern Sunshine Coast. Created in 1990 at 57 ha. in size, the park was expanded to approximately 146 ha. in 1997.

== See also ==
- List of British Columbia provincial parks
