= Jackson Narrows Marine Provincial Park =

Provincial park in British Columbia, Canada

- IUCN category II (national park)
- Location within British Columbia
- Interactive map of Jackson Narrows Marine Provincial Park
- Location: Range 3 Coast Land District, British Columbia, Canada
- Nearest city: Bella Bella, BC
- Coordinates: 52°31′27″N 128°18′06″W
- Area: 67 ha (170 acres)
- Established: September 16, 1992
- Governing body: BC Parks

Jackson Narrows Marine Provincial Park is a provincial park in British Columbia, Canada, located on the west side of Mathieson Channel to the north of the community of Bella Bella. The park can only be accessed by boat.
