= Diana Lake Provincial Park =

Provincial park of British Columbia

- IUCN category II (national park)
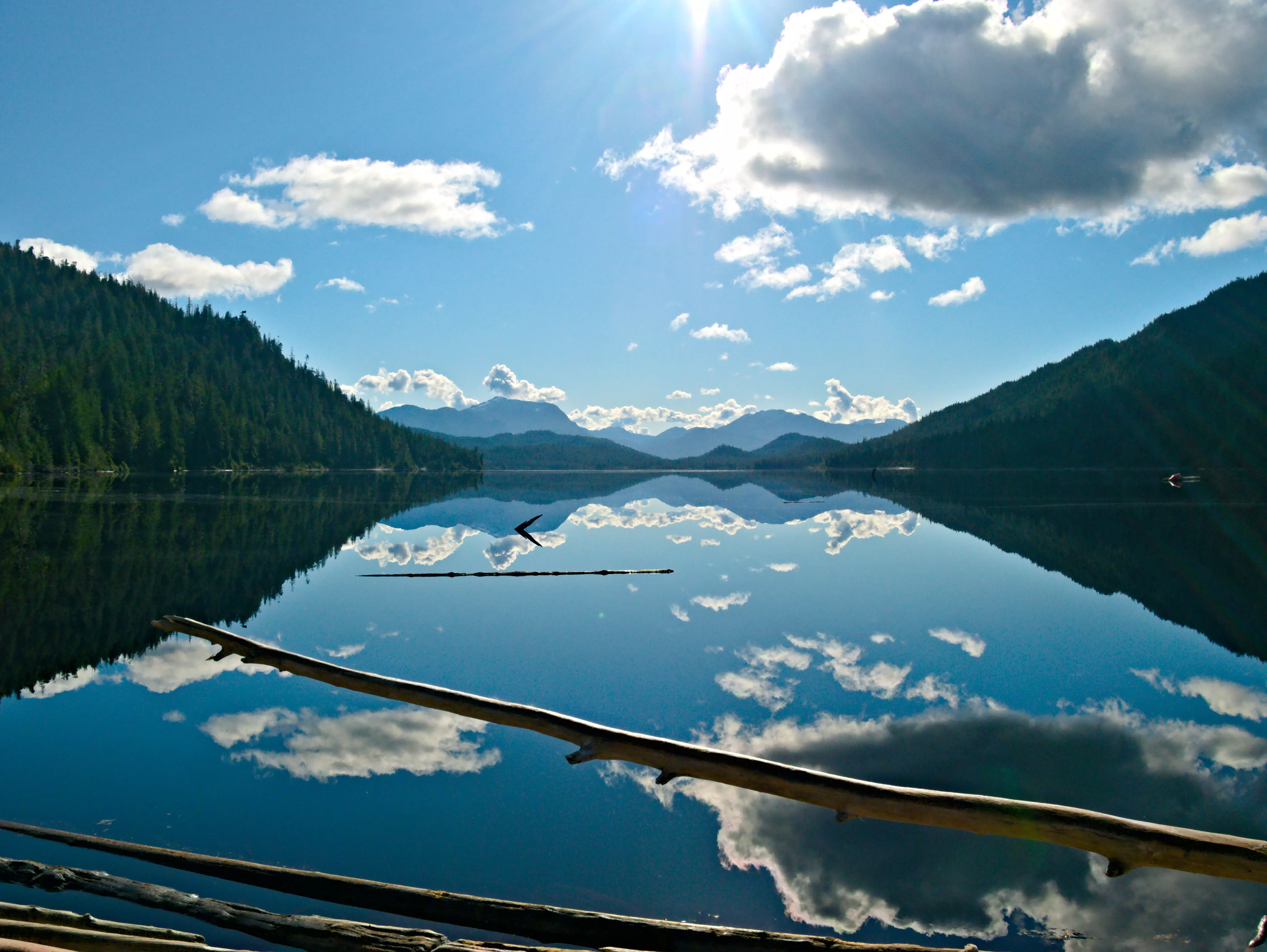
- Calm Morning at Diana Lake Provincial Park

- Location within British Columbia
- Interactive map of Diana Lake Provincial Park
- Location: North Coast RD, British Columbia
- Nearest city: Prince Rupert
- Coordinates: 54°13′44″N 130°09′45″W
- Area: 233 ha (580 acres)
- Created: 4 March 1980
- Governing body: BC Parks

Diana Lake Provincial Park is a 233 hectares (580 acres) provincial park located 16 kilometres east of the city of Prince Rupert in the North Coast Regional District of British Columbia, Canada. The park was established by BC Parks in 1980.

== Description ==
The park provides lake, lakeshore and forest recreation opportunities for local residents and travelers along the Highway 16 corridor. Diana Lake is the primary freshwater recreation site in the region.

Diana Creek nature trail winds along Diana Creek through coastal temperate rainforest. The MacDonald Trail starts in the park, steps through several blanket bogs, and runs up to MacDonald peak.

All five species of pacific salmon, as well as steelhead, rainbow and Dolly Varden trout can be found in the lakes and creeks around this park.

From May 15 to September 15, the day-use area is accessible. This park does not have access to drinkable water.

== Images ==
Media related to Diana Lake Provincial Park at Wikimedia Commons

Diana Creek Rapids

Diana Creek

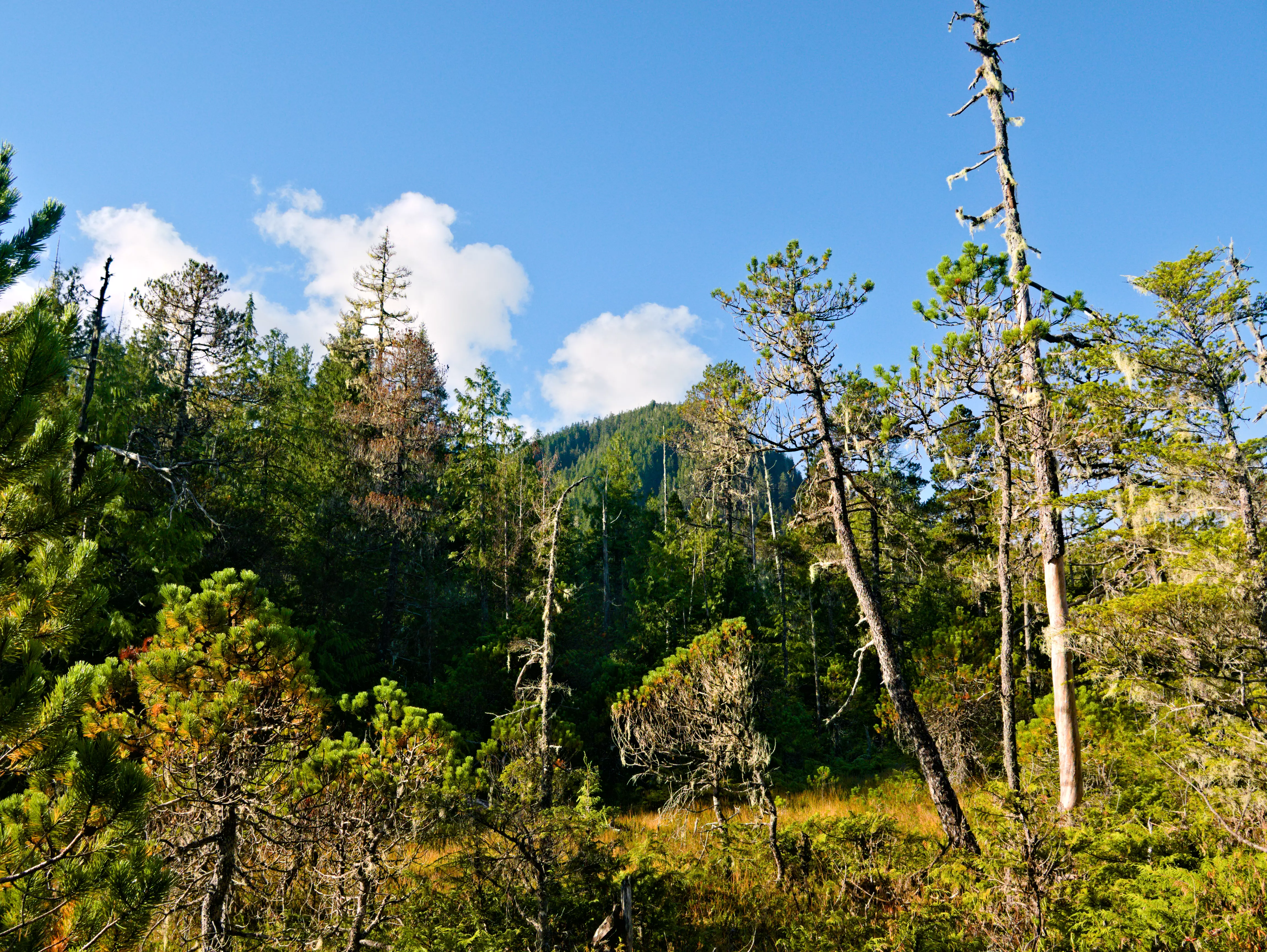
Bog Woodland

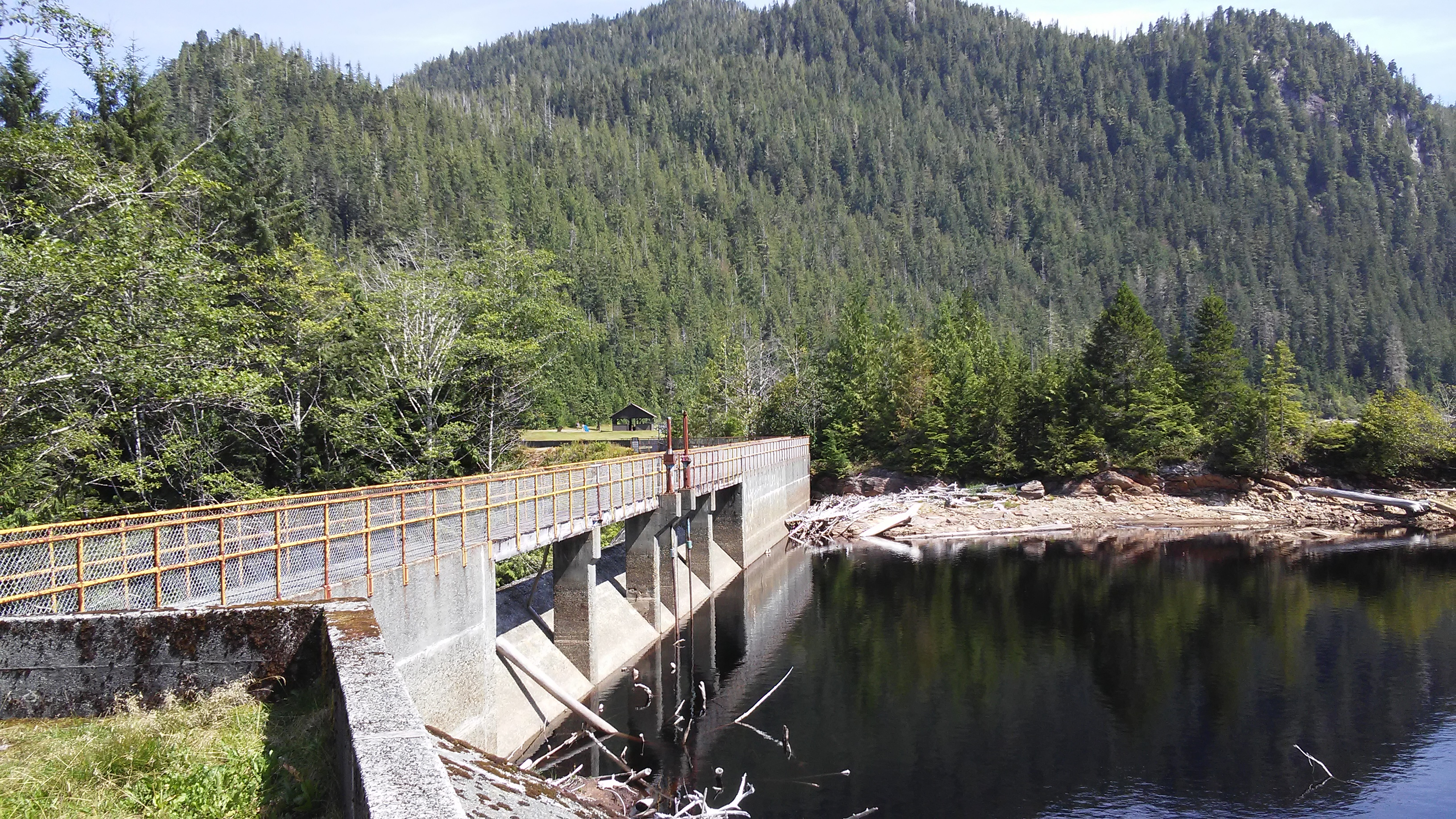
Skeena Cellulose Dam

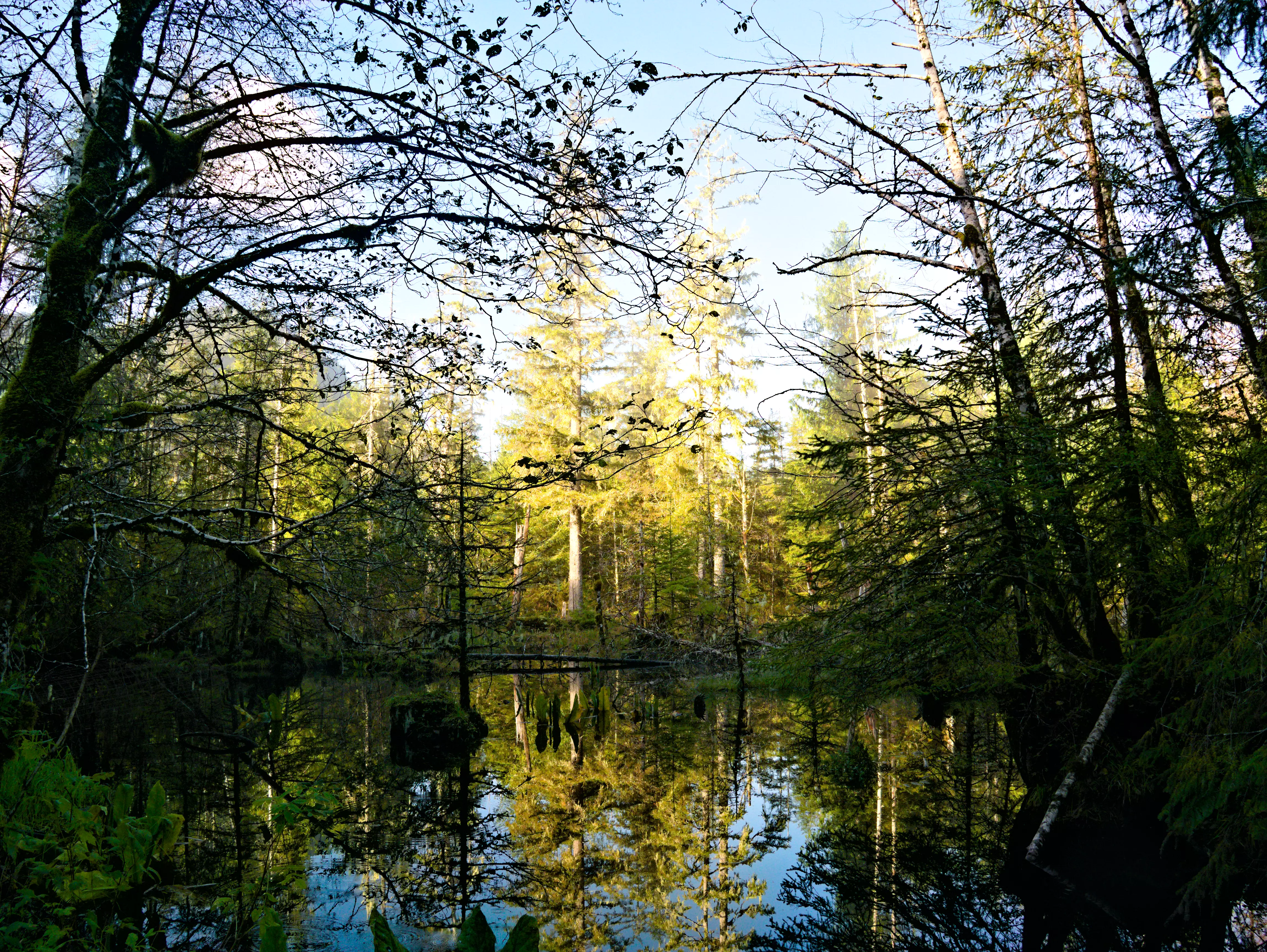
Wetland pond

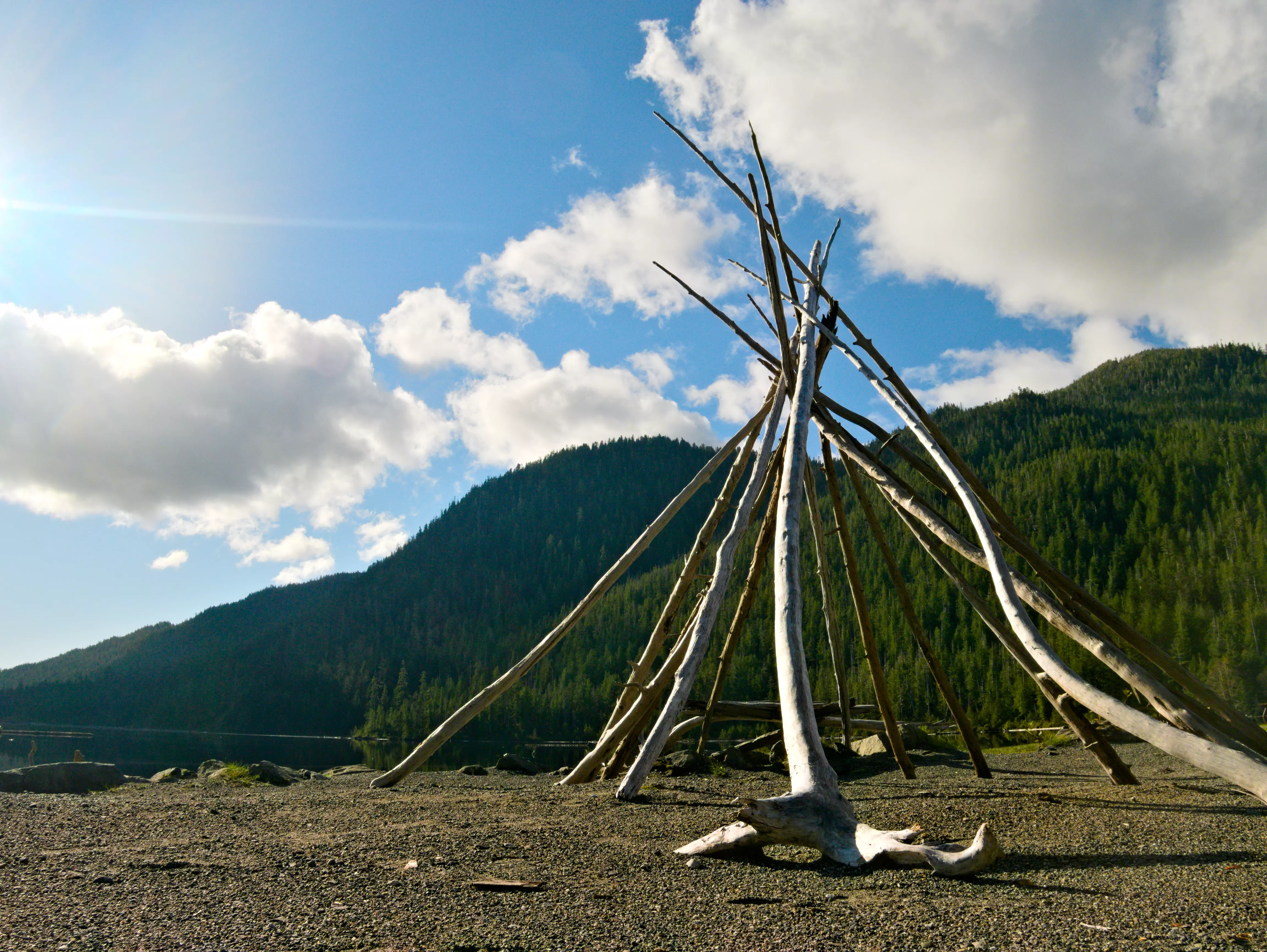
Driftwood sculpture

== See also ==
- Prudhomme Lake Provincial Park
