= Dala-Kildala Rivers Estuaries Provincial Park =

Provincial park in British Columbia, Canada

- IUCN category II (national park)
- Location within British Columbia
- Interactive map of Dala-Kildala Rivers Estuaries Provincial Park
- Location: Range 4 Coast Land District, British Columbia, Canada
- Nearest city: Kitimat, BC
- Coordinates: 53°50′14″N 128°30′15″W
- Area: 741 ha (1,830 acres)
- Established: May 17, 2004
- Governing body: BC Parks

Dala-Kildala Rivers Estuaries Provincial Park is a provincial park of 452 ha. in British Columbia, Canada. It protects the mouth of the Dala River in Kildala Arm.

== Climate ==
Climate data for Dala-Kildala Rivers Estuaries Provincial Park
| Month | Jan | Feb | Mar | Apr | May | Jun | Jul | Aug | Sep | Oct | Nov | Dec | Year |
|---|---|---|---|---|---|---|---|---|---|---|---|---|---|
| Record high °C (°F) | 10 (50) | 9.5 (49.1) | 17 (63) | 24.4 (75.9) | 30 (86) | 31.7 (89.1) | 34.5 (94.1) | 33 (91) | 29.4 (84.9) | 18 (64) | 14.4 (57.9) | 12 (54) | 34.5 (94.1) |
| Mean daily maximum °C (°F) | −0.5 (31.1) | 2.3 (36.1) | 6.3 (43.3) | 10.7 (51.3) | 14.8 (58.6) | 17.6 (63.7) | 20.4 (68.7) | 20.5 (68.9) | 16.2 (61.2) | 9.7 (49.5) | 3.7 (38.7) | 0.5 (32.9) | 10.2 (50.4) |
| Daily mean °C (°F) | −2.5 (27.5) | −0.3 (31.5) | 2.9 (37.2) | 6.3 (43.3) | 10.1 (50.2) | 13.2 (55.8) | 15.7 (60.3) | 15.8 (60.4) | 12.2 (54.0) | 7.2 (45.0) | 1.8 (35.2) | −1.1 (30.0) | 6.8 (44.2) |
| Mean daily minimum °C (°F) | −4.5 (23.9) | −2.9 (26.8) | −0.5 (31.1) | 1.9 (35.4) | 5.4 (41.7) | 8.7 (47.7) | 10.9 (51.6) | 11.1 (52.0) | 8.2 (46.8) | 4.6 (40.3) | 0 (32) | −2.7 (27.1) | 3.3 (37.9) |
| Record low °C (°F) | −23.9 (−11.0) | −18.3 (−0.9) | −15 (5) | −4.4 (24.1) | −2.5 (27.5) | 2.5 (36.5) | 2.8 (37.0) | 2 (36) | −0.6 (30.9) | −12 (10) | −23.5 (−10.3) | −20.6 (−5.1) | −23.9 (−11.0) |
| Average precipitation mm (inches) | 264.7 (10.42) | 195.1 (7.68) | 153.5 (6.04) | 128.5 (5.06) | 84.7 (3.33) | 85.8 (3.38) | 78.7 (3.10) | 100 (3.9) | 179.7 (7.07) | 317.3 (12.49) | 281.1 (11.07) | 289.1 (11.38) | 2,158 (85.0) |
Source: Environment Canada
