= Sugar Lake (Aitkin County, Minnesota) =

Lake in the state of Minnesota, United States

- Location within Minnesota
- Location: Aitkin County, Minnesota
- Coordinates: 46°24′55″N 93°28′34″W
- Type: lake

Sugar Lake is a lake in Aitkin County, Minnesota, in the United States.

Sugar Lake was named from the sugar maple trees growing there.

== See also ==
- List of lakes in Minnesota
