= Ross Lake (Wood County, Wisconsin) =

Lake in the state of Wisconsin, United States

- Location within Wisconsin
- Location: Wood County, Wisconsin
- Coordinates: 44°16′26″N 89°52′54″W
- Type: Reservoir
- Basin countries: United States
- Surface area: 52 acres (21 ha)
- Max. depth: 5 ft (1.5 m)
- Surface elevation: 928 ft (283 m)

Ross Lake is a reservoir in the U.S. state of Wisconsin. The lake has a surface area of 52 acres (21 ha) and reaches a depth of 5 feet (1.5 m).

Ross Lake was named after the local Ross family, who once owned the site.
