= Oliver Cove Marine Provincial Park =

Provincial park in British Columbia, Canada

- IUCN category II (national park)
- Location within British Columbia
- Interactive map of Oliver Cove Marine Provincial Park
- Location: Central Coast RD, British Columbia
- Nearest city: Bella Bella
- Coordinates: 52°18′43″N 128°21′18″W
- Area: 74 ha (180 acres)
- Created: 16 September 1992
- Governing body: BC Parks

Oliver Cove Marine Provincial Park, also known as Port Blackney, is a provincial park at the southwest end of the Don Peninsula on the North Coast of British Columbia, Canada. It is accessible only by boat, but lacks docks or other facilities. The park comprises 26 hectares of marine area and 48 hectares of land area.
