= Ross Lake (Ohio) =

- Location within Ohio
- Location: Ross County, Ohio
- Coordinates: 39°20′30″N 82°54′35″W
- Type: reservoir
- Basin countries: United States
- Surface area: 140 acres (57 ha)
- Surface elevation: 699 ft (213 m)

Ross Lake is a reservoir in Ross County, Ohio, in the United States. The reservoir was created in 1967.

Ross Lake took its name from Ross County.

== See also ==
- List of lakes in Ohio
