= Green Inlet Marine Provincial Park =

Provincial park in British Columbia, Canada

- IUCN category II (national park)
- Location within British Columbia
- Interactive map of Green Inlet Marine Provincial Park
- Location: Range 3 Coast Land District, British Columbia, Canada
- Nearest city: Butedale, BC
- Coordinates: 52°55′13″N 128°28′57″W
- Area: 33 ha (82 acres)
- Established: 1971
- Governing body: BC Parks

Green Inlet Marine Provincial Park is a provincial park in British Columbia, Canada, in the North Coast region to the southeast of Butedale and containing 33 ha.
