= Hotham Sound =

Coordinates: 49°52′05″N 124°02′23″W

Hotham Sound is a sidewater of Jervis Inlet on the South Coast of British Columbia, Canada, located near the mouth of that inlet on the north flank of its lower reaches, roughly opposite the mouth of Sechelt Inlet. There is a deep basin at its entrance reaching a depth of 730 m (2,400 ft). Harmony Islands Marine Provincial Park is located on the east side of Hotham Sound. The spectacular Harmony Falls, also called Freil Lake Falls, plunges a total of 444 m (1,457 ft) into the Sound.
