= Seeley Lake Provincial Park =

Provincial park in British Columbia, Canada

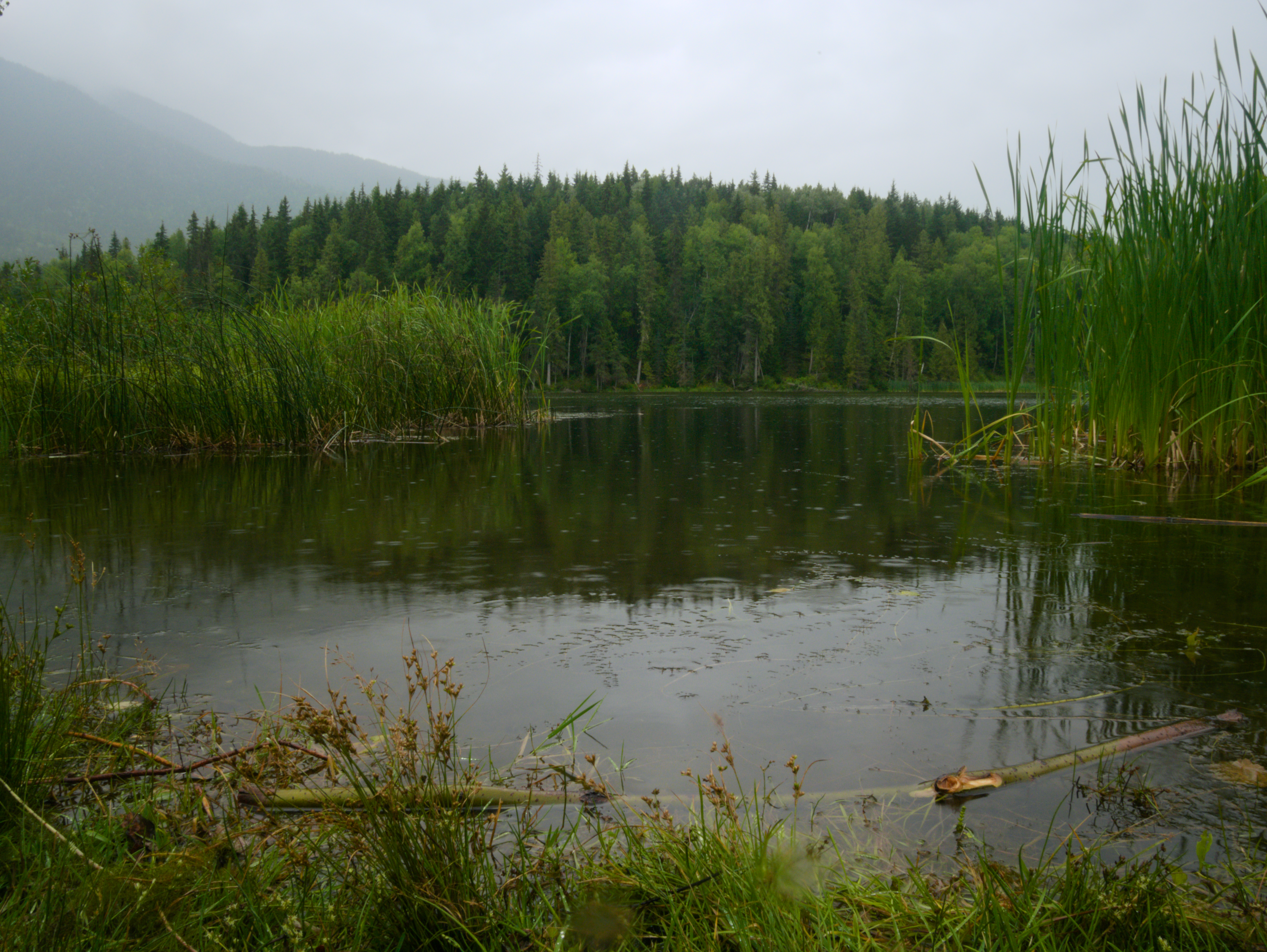
- Rain falls amongst the wetlands on the shores of Seeley Lake

- Location within British Columbia
- Interactive map of Seeley Lake Provincial Park
- Location: Canada
- Nearest city: Hazelton, British Columbia
- Coordinates: 55°11′55″N 127°41′25″W
- Area: 24 ha (59 acres)
- Established: 1956
- Operator: BC Parks

Seeley Lake Provincial Park is a provincial park in British Columbia, Canada, located within the asserted traditional territory of the Gitxsan First Nation, south of the confluence of the Skeena and Bulkley Rivers.

The park offers compelling views of the Hazelton Mountains, and contains wetlands harboring a variety of nesting birds, mammals and reptiles.
