= Garden Bay Marine Provincial Park =

Provincial park in British Columbia, Canada

- IUCN category II (national park)
- Location within British Columbia
- Interactive map of Garden Bay Marine Provincial Park
- Location: New Westminster Land District, British Columbia, Canada
- Nearest city: Pender Harbour, BC
- Coordinates: 49°38′16″N 124°00′21″W
- Area: 163 ha (400 acres)
- Established: May 29, 1969
- Governing body: BC Parks

Garden Bay Marine Provincial Park is a provincial park in British Columbia, Canada at the northwest end of the Sechelt Peninsula on the lower Sunshine Coast, near the community of Madeira Park. Established in 1969, it is approximately 163 ha.

== See also ==
- List of British Columbia provincial parks
