= Sleeping Beauty Mountain Provincial Park =

Provincial park in British Columbia, Canada

- IUCN category II (national park)
- Location within British Columbia
- Interactive map of Sleeping Beauty Mountain Provincial Park
- Location: British Columbia, Canada
- Nearest city: Terrace
- Coordinates: 54°35′30″N 128°46′08″W
- Area: 2.98 km^{2} (1.15 sq mi)
- Established: May 20, 2004
- Governing body: BC Parks

Sleeping Beauty Mountain Provincial Park is a provincial park in British Columbia, Canada located northwest of the city of Terrace. It is located in the watershed of the Zymagotitz River.
