= Hardy Island Marine Provincial Park =

Provincial park in British Columbia, Canada

- IUCN category II (national park)
- Location within British Columbia
- Interactive map of Hardy Island Marine Provincial Park
- Location: Hardy Island, British Columbia
- Nearest city: Powell River
- Coordinates: 49°43′42″N 124°12′58″W
- Area: 17 ha (42 acres)
- Designation: Marine Provincial Park
- Created: 6 March 1992

Hardy Island Marine Provincial Park, formerly Musket Island Marine Provincial Park, is a provincial park located near the southern tip of the Hardy Island in British Columbia, Canada. The park as created by BC Parks on 6 March 1992 to protect local flora and fauna. The park itself becomes a small island during high tide.

== Facilities ==
The park provides a safe anchorage for people recreating in Blind Bay. The park features no developed trails or potable water.
