= Hai Lake–Mount Herman Provincial Park =

Provincial park in British Columbia, Canada

Hai Lake-Mount Herman Provincial Park
- IUCN category II (national park)
- Location within British Columbia
- Interactive map of Hai Lake-Mount Herman Provincial Park
- Location: Range 5 Coast Land District, British Columbia, Canada
- Nearest city: Terrace, BC
- Coordinates: 54°24′59″N 128°35′44″W
- Area: 323 ha (800 acres)
- Established: May 17, 2004
- Governing body: BC Parks

Hai Lake–Mount Herman Provincial Park is a provincial park in British Columbia, Canada. Established in 2004, it is 323 ha. and protects regionally significant bog ecosystems and old-growth forests. The park caters to outdoor pursuits such as day hiking, camping, fishing, and hunting.
