= Lakelse Lake Wetlands Provincial Park =

Provincial park in British Columbia, Canada, located near the city of Terrace

- IUCN category II (national park)
- Location within British Columbia
- Interactive map of Lakelse Lake Wetlands Provincial Park
- Location: British Columbia, Canada
- Nearest city: Terrace
- Coordinates: 54°20′09″N 128°35′10″W
- Area: 12.14 km^{2} (4.69 sq mi)
- Established: May 17, 2004
- Governing body: BC Parks

Lakelse Lake Wetlands Provincial Park is a provincial park in British Columbia, Canada, located near the city of Terrace in that province's Skeena Country. It is 1214 ha. in size.
