= Ross Lake Provincial Park =

Provincial park in British Columbia, Canada

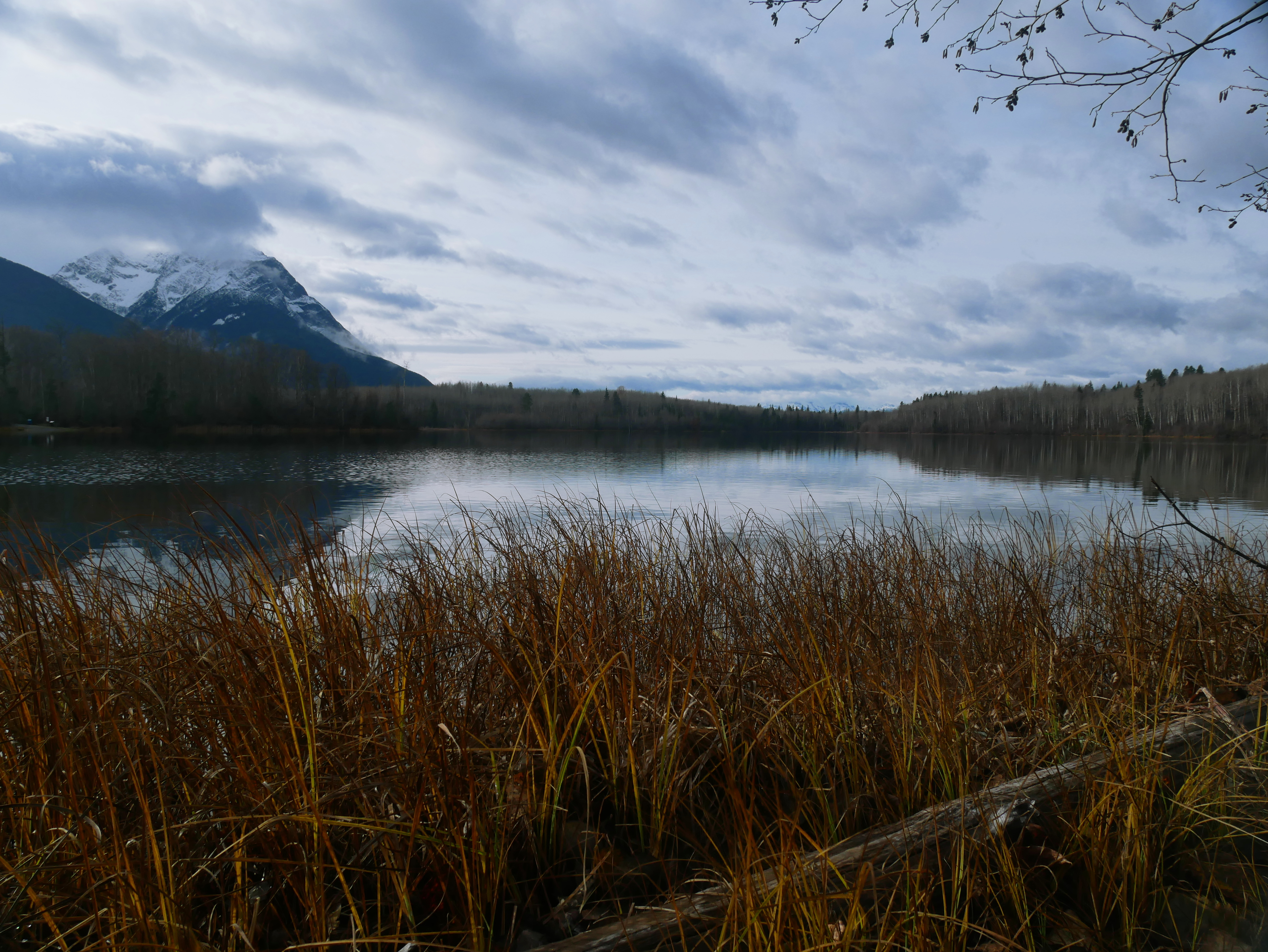
- Autumn View from Ross Lake Provincial Park

- Location within British Columbia
- Interactive map of Ross Lake Provincial Park
- Location: Canada
- Nearest city: Hazelton, British Columbia
- Coordinates: 55°15′39″N 127°31′35″W
- Area: 307 ha (760 acres)
- Established: January 31, 1974
- Operator: BC Parks
- Website: bcparks.ca/ross-lake-park/

Ross Lake Provincial Park is a provincial park in British Columbia, Canada. The park is located within the asserted traditional territory of the Gitxsan people, south of Nine Mile Mountain, just east of Hazelton in the Skeena Country.
