= Brackendale Eagles Provincial Park =

Provincial park in British Columbia, Canada

- IUCN category II (national park)
- Location within British Columbia
- Interactive map of Brackendale Eagles Provincial Park
- Location: New Westminster Land District, British Columbia, Canada
- Nearest city: Squamish, BC
- Coordinates: 49°45′14″N 123°10′29″W
- Area: 765 ha (1,890 acres)
- Established: June 28, 1999
- Governing body: BC Parks

Brackendale Eagles Provincial Park is a provincial park in British Columbia, Canada, located on the Squamish River adjacent to Brackendale, a suburban neighbourhood of Squamish. It is notable for its bald eagle population during the winter months and is inaccessible to visitors.

== History ==
In 1992, the government of British Columbia announced its Protected Areas Strategy that would protect 12% of the province by 2000. The west side of the Squamish River, which is recognized as a critical wintering site for bald eagles, was selected for protection as part of the strategy, and Brackendale Eagles Provincial Park was formally established in 1999. The park is the holder of the world record for bald eagles counted, with 3,769 in 1994.

== Ecology ==
The park is a critical wintering site for bald eagles, who feed off salmon in the Squamish and Cheakamus Rivers during the winter, and the park hosts approximately 148 species of birds. The park is also home to several large mammals species; these are black bear, Roosevelt elk, bobcat, cougar, grey wolf, Columbian black-tailed deer, and coyote. There are many small mammals, such as northern flying squirrels, yellow pine chipmunks, and snowshoe hares. Reptiles and amphibians are also present in the park, although with a smaller variety of species than that of the park's mammals.
