= Codville Lagoon Marine Provincial Park =

Provincial park in British Columbia, Canada

- IUCN category II (national park)
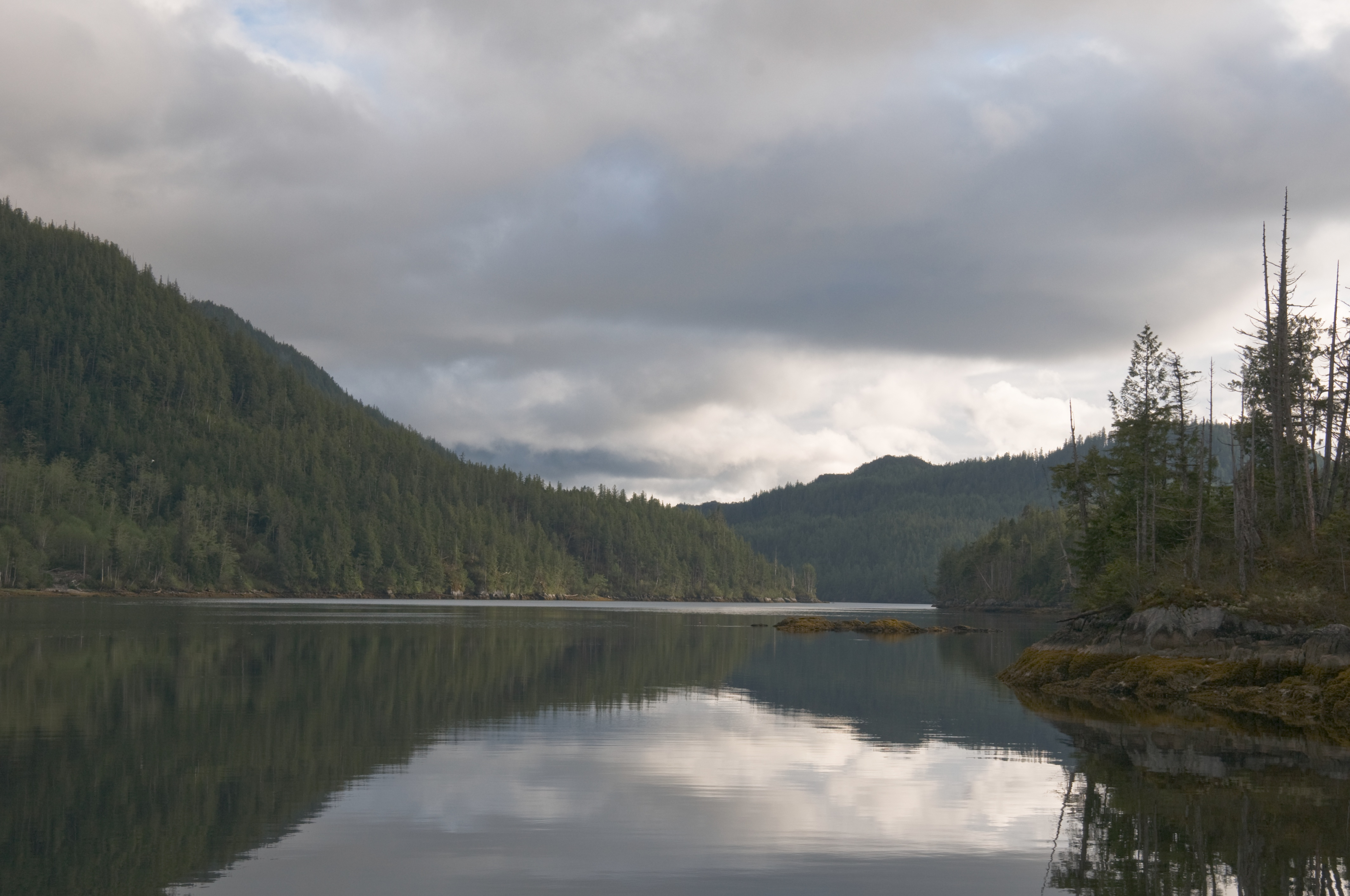
- Codville Lagoon Marine Provincial Park

- Location within British Columbia Location within Canada
- Interactive map of Codville Lagoon Marine Provincial Park
- Location: Central Coast RD, British Columbia
- Nearest city: Bella Bella
- Coordinates: 52°03′40″N 127°50′30″W
- Area: 860 ha (2,100 acres)
- Created: 16 September 1992
- Governing body: BC Parks

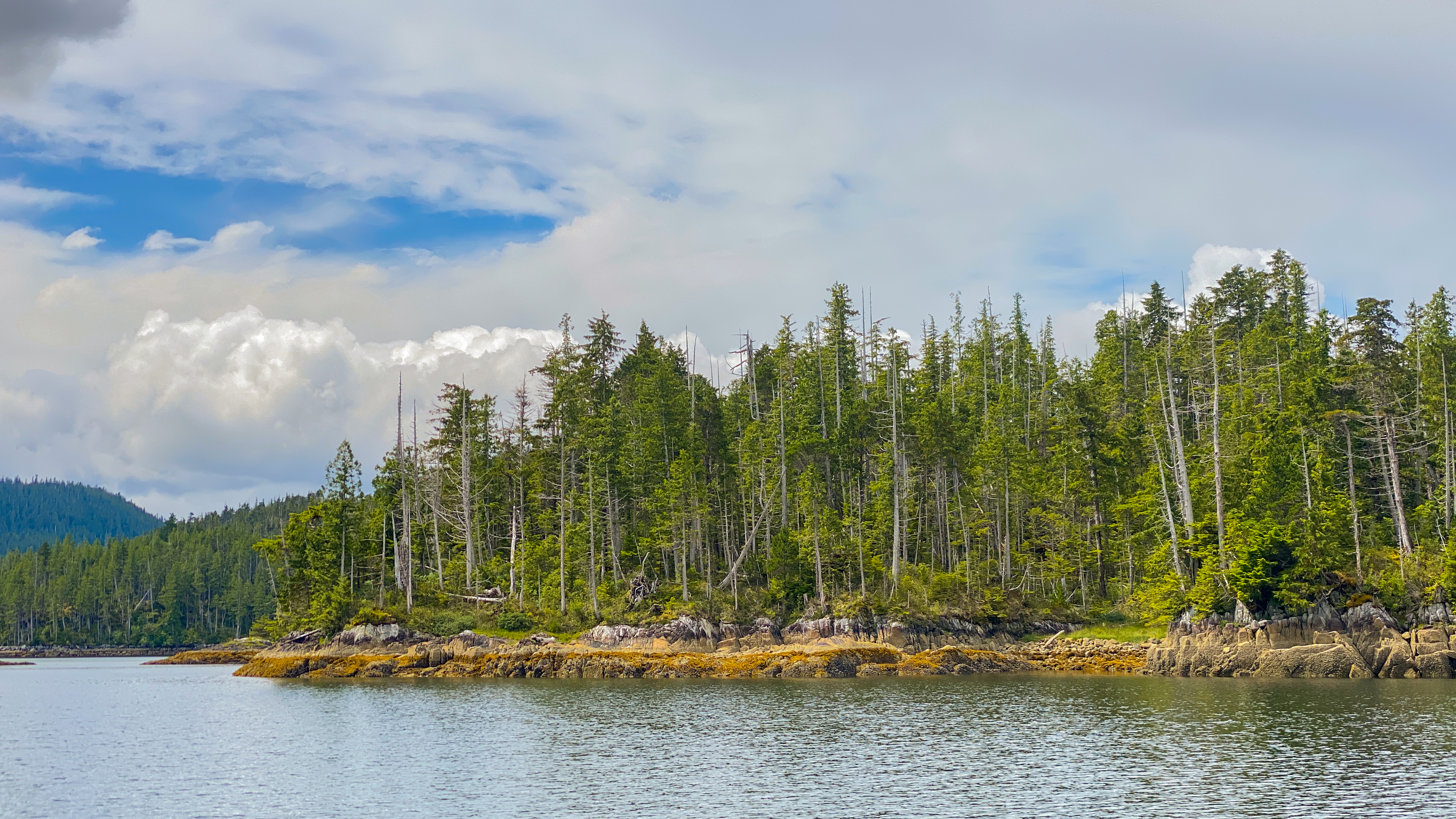
Trees along the shore of Codville Lagoon Marine Provincial Park, 2022

Codville Lagoon Marine Provincial Park is a provincial park in British Columbia, Canada, located on the southwest end of King Island. The park was created in 1965 because it is a significant site to the Heiltsuk people. This park, which is approximately 755 hectares (1,870 acres) in area, has an unmaintained trail to Sagar Lake which has a red sand beach. Created in 1992, it was expanded in 1995 by the incorporation of the former Sugar Lake Provincial Park.
