= Gitnadoiks River Provincial Park =

Provincial park in British Columbia, Canada

- IUCN category Ib (wilderness area)
- Location within British Columbia
- Interactive map of Gitnadoiks River Provincial Park
- Location: Kitimat-Stikine, British Columbia, Canada
- Coordinates: 54°10′00″N 129°10′00″W
- Area: 57,843 ha (223.33 sq mi)
- Established: December 10, 1986
- Governing body: BC Parks

Gitnadoiks River Provincial Park (formerly Gitnadoix River Recreation Area) is a 58,000 hectare provincial park in British Columbia, Canada. It is centred on the Gitnadoix River, a tributary of the Skeena River in Northwestern British Columbia, 50 km west of Terrace.

Within the traditional territory of the Tsimshian people, the park is in a remote, wilderness setting in the Kitimat Ranges of the Coast Mountains and is inaccessible by road.
