= Kitsumkalum Provincial Park =

Provincial park in British Columbia, Canada

- IUCN category II (national park)
- Location within British Columbia
- Interactive map of Kitsumkalum Provincial Park
- Location: British Columbia, Canada
- Nearest city: Terrace
- Coordinates: 54°43′18″N 128°46′15″W
- Area: 40 hectares (99 acres)
- Established: 1946
- Governing body: BC Parks
- Website: Official website

Kitsumkalum Park is in the Skeena region of west central British Columbia, Canada. This provincial park is on the east shore of the Kitsumkalum River at the foot of Kitsumkalum Lake. On Kalum Lake Road, the locality is by road about 29 kilometres (18 mi) north of Terrace.

== Allard/Hart farm ==
Matthew (Matt) Allard arrived in 1905, building his cabin around 1912, when he obtained his pre-emption. He was primarily a trapper and prospector, who worked claims on Maroon Mountain. In 1934, Joseph (Joe) K. Hart came and bought the Allard farm, one of several properties acquired for their timber holdings. He established a mink farm and beaver farm on 12 hectares (30 acres) of cleared land. Sold to Columbia Cellulose in the 1940s for logging, the eastern shore part became a piece of the provincial park. The western shore part became the Hart Farm Recreation Site.

== Ackerman Point ==
In the early 1920s, George Cobb established a hotel as a roadhouse, which catered to miners, homesteaders, and pole cutters, who travelled northward to the lake and beyond. The Kalum Lake Transfer, a rudimentary motor vehicle, carried passengers and freight to Cobb's Landing.

The location, which became known as Ackerman Point, lies at the northern boundary of the provincial park. In 1928, Ethel and Everett Dix, with daughter Vivian, nicknamed Dixie, arrived and the family bought the hotel. That year, they extensively upgraded the lodgings to attract local residents and as a destination for wealthy American tourists drawn by the abundant hunting and fishing. During the summer months, the hotel was open, and during wintertime, the family lived in Terrace. However, that winter, they built a dance hall next to the hotel, holding the first dance in June 1929. With music provided by an orchestra, the dances were popular and attracted people from all over the region. Everett Dix built a good sized boat for the hotel guests in 1931. Following the death of Ethel and the marriage of Dixie in 1933, Everett leased the property in 1934 to R.W. Riley, the Terrace druggist, and relocated.

During World War II, soldiers from the Terrace military camp trained at Kalum Lake. The army had numerous amphibious jeeps which entered the lake near the hotel site.

In 1983, what would become the Terrace Heritage Park Museum was established. Needing a building to house artifacts, the group inspected the abandoned Kalum Lake Hotel, which was experiencing vandalism. The log structure was moved from the lake to Terrace. The giant rosebush from beside the hotel was also successfully replanted at the museum. The unusual features of the dance hall, which was also acquired, comprise vertical logs, a hip roof, and an orchestra pit.

== Ferries ==
During the 1920s, a lengthy raft crossed the river. Called Cobb's Ferry or jokingly the "Queen Mary", the sternwheeler was powered by a circling horse.

In 1935–36, a subsidized small ferry was installed across the river at the outlet from the lake.

The ferry was discontinued in the late 1940s.

== Kalum Lake Road ==
By 1914, a wagon road existed along the east shore of the river from Terrace to the south end of the lake.

In 1971, a logging road was completed up the east side of the lake. This road, taken over by the province several years later, was paved in 1984.

== Park profile ==
In 1946, the province established a 10-hectare (25-acre) park at the location of a former Forest Service recreation site. The park has since expanded to 40 hectares (99 acres). The wildlife habitat includes black bears, grizzly bears, and bald eagles.

== Park and adjacent facilities ==
The user-maintained campground has seven unmarked sites, which cannot be reserved, but are available on a first come, first serve basis. Manoeuvring large RVs is difficult, so the facility is best suited for tenting. Seasonal fishing is popular. Windsurfing boards, canoes, kayaks, and small boats, can be launched from the sandy shoreline. A pit toilet is provided, but potable water, firewood, picnic tables, or shelters are not present. A general store exists 10 minutes drive north at Rosswood.

== Maps ==
- Resources near Terrace map. 1925.
- "Standard Oil BC map". www.davidrumsey.com. 1937.
- "Shell BC map". www.davidrumsey.com. 1956.
