= Ross Lake (Crow Wing County, Minnesota) =

Lake in the state of Minnesota, United States

- Location within Minnesota
- Location: Crow Wing County, Minnesota
- Coordinates: 46°39′46″N 93°50′11″W
- Type: lake

Ross Lake is a lake in Crow Wing County, in the U.S. state of Minnesota, covering 491 acres.

Ross Lake was named for an early lumberman.

== See also ==
- List of lakes in Minnesota
