= Prudhomme Lake Provincial Park =

Canadian provincial park

- IUCN category II (national park)
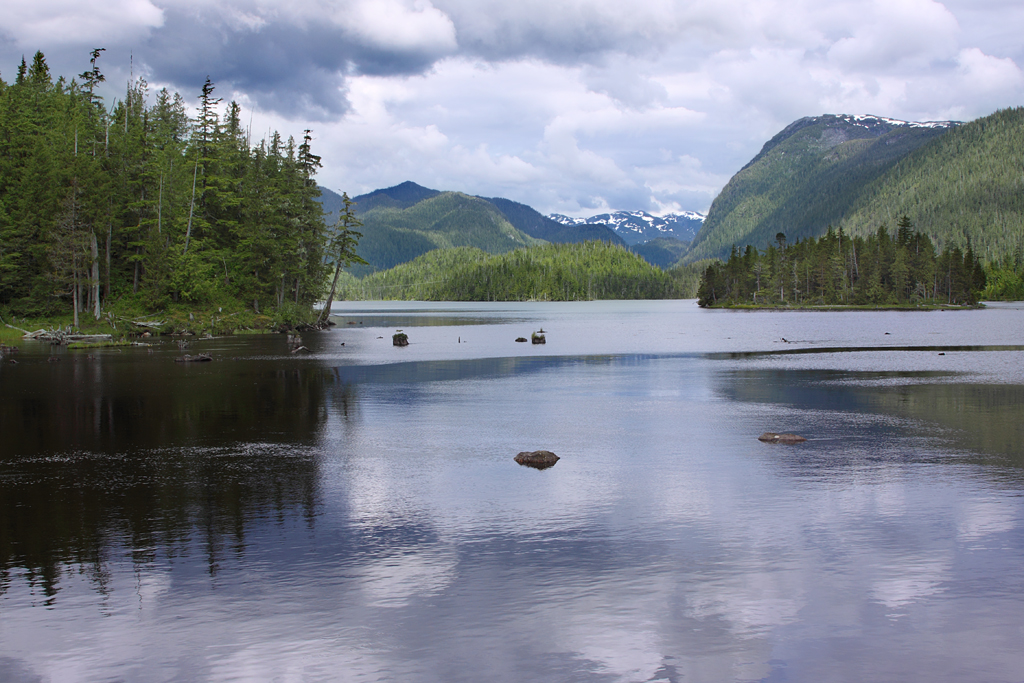
- Prudhomme Lake

- Location within British Columbia
- Interactive map of Prudhomme Lake Provincial Park
- Location: North Coast RD, British Columbia
- Nearest city: Prince Rupert
- Coordinates: 54.241°N 130.132°W
- Area: 9 ha (22 acres)
- Created: 1 June 1964
- Governing body: BC Parks

Prudhomme Lake Provincial Park is a provincial park just east of Prince Rupert in British Columbia, Canada.

== See also ==
- Diana Lake Provincial Park
