= Tzoonie Mountain =

Mountain in British Columbia, Canada

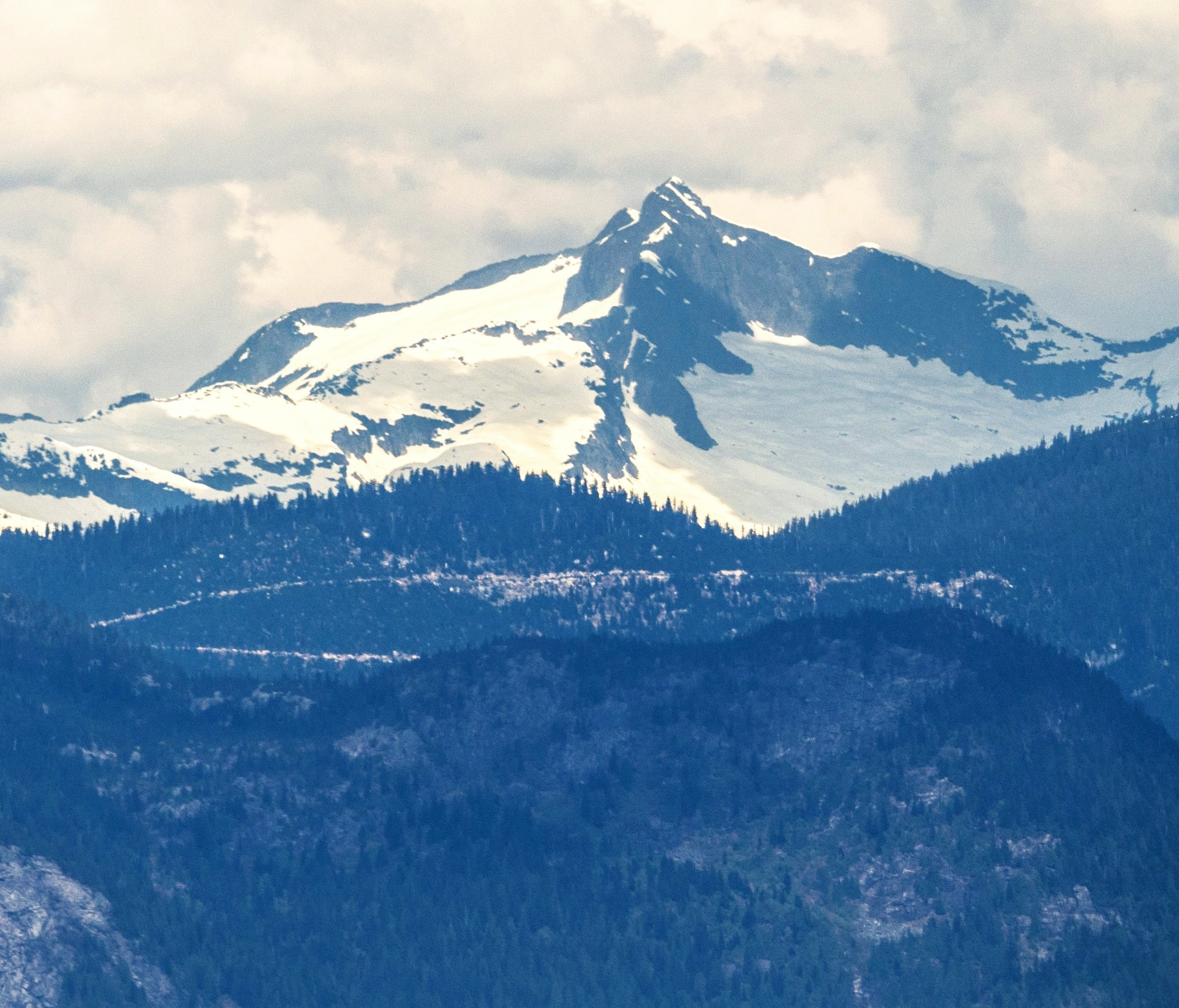
- Southeast aspect of 2,123-metre summit

Highest point
- Elevation: 2,123 m (6,965 ft)
- Prominence: 912 m (2,992 ft)
- Parent peak: Mount Jimmy Jimmy (2,208 m)
- Isolation: 11.79 km (7.33 mi)
- Listing: Mountains of British Columbia
- Coordinates: 49°51′41″N 123°35′14″W

Naming
- Etymology: Tzoonie River

Geography
- Location within British Columbia Location within Canada
- Country: Canada
- Province: British Columbia
- District: New Westminster Land District
- Parent range: Coast Mountains
- Topo map: NTS 92G13 Jervis Inlet

Tzoonie Mountain is a 2,123-metre (6,965-foot) summit in British Columbia, Canada.

== Description ==
Tzoonie Mountain is located in the Coast Mountains, 75 kilometres (47 mi) northwest of Vancouver and 12 kilometres (7.5 mi) southwest of Mount Jimmy Jimmy, which is the nearest higher neighbor. The highest point of the sprawling mountain is set three kilometres (1.9 mi) southwest of the point labeled as Tzoonie Mountain on maps. Precipitation runoff and glacial meltwater from this mountain drains west to the Tzoonie River and east to the Clowhom River. Tzoonie Mountain is more notable for its rise above local terrain than for its absolute elevation as topographic relief is significant with the summit rising over 1,820 metres (5,970 ft) above the Tzoonie River in three kilometres (1.9 mi). The mountain is named in association with the Tzoonie River and the mountain's toponym was officially adopted on May 2, 1955, by the Geographical Names Board of Canada. The indigenous word "Tzoonie" may be a variation of Ts’únay (or Tsonai), the name for a Sechelt people, whose members were based at Deserted Bay on Jervis Inlet.

== Climate ==
Based on the Köppen climate classification, Tzoonie Mountain is located in the marine west coast climate zone of western North America. Most weather fronts originate in the Pacific Ocean, and travel east toward the Coast Mountains where they are forced upward by the range (orographic lift), causing them to drop their moisture in the form of rain or snowfall. As a result, the Coast Mountains experience high precipitation, especially during the winter months in the form of snowfall. Winter temperatures can drop below −10 °C with wind chill factors below −20 °C. This climate supports an unnamed glacier on the north slope of the peak. The months July through September offer the most favorable weather for climbing Tzoonie Mountain.

== See also ==
- Geography of British Columbia
- Geology of British Columbia
