= Sechelt Inlets Marine Provincial Park =

Provincial park in British Columbia, Canada

Sechelt Inlets Provincial Park
- IUCN category II (national park)
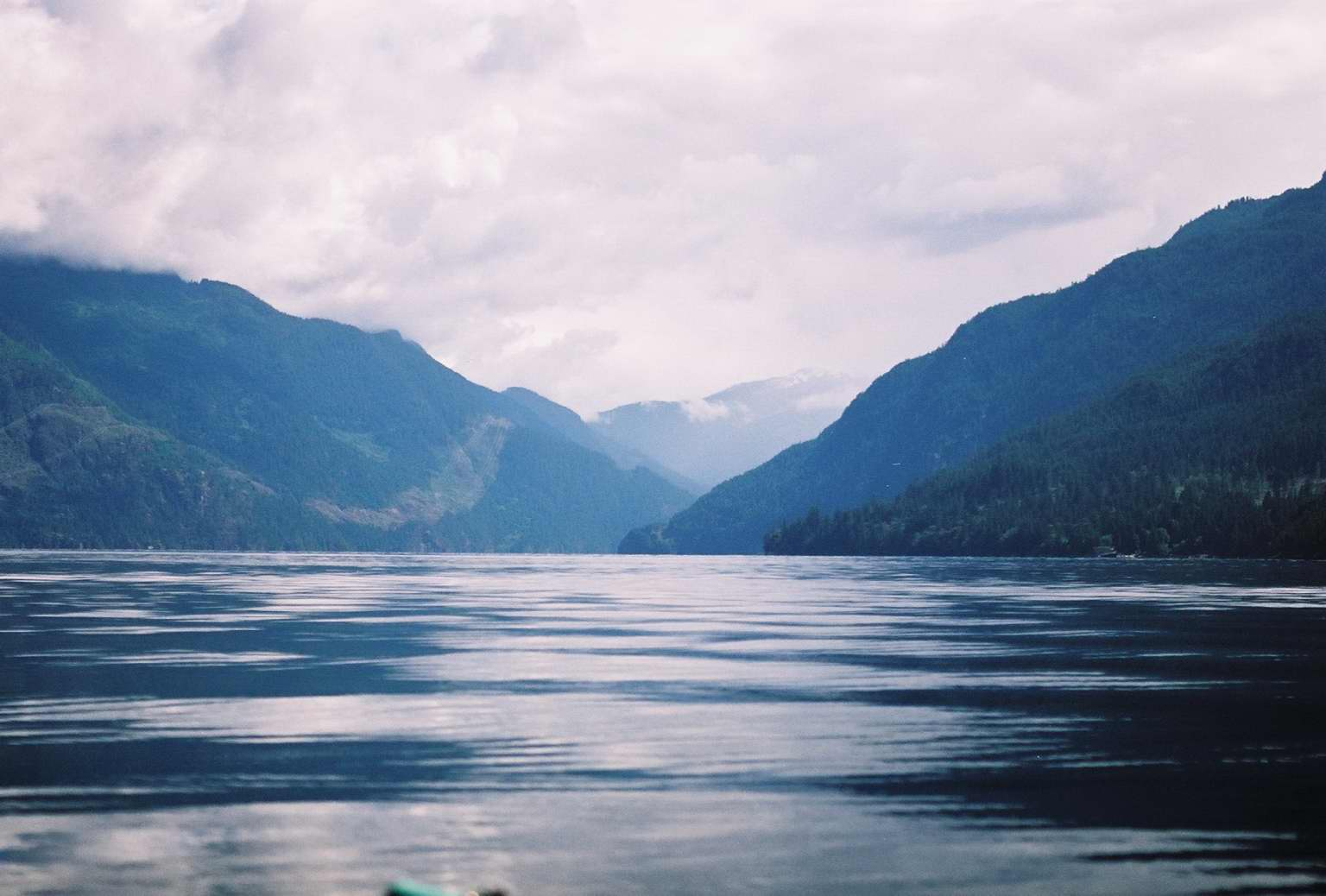
- Sechelt Inlet, 2005

- Location within British Columbia
- Interactive map of Sechelt Inlets Provincial Park
- Location: British Columbia, Canada
- Nearest city: Sechelt
- Coordinates: 49°37′51″N 123°48′22″W
- Area: 1.4 km^{2} (0.54 sq mi)
- Established: July 10, 1980
- Governing body: BC Parks

Sechelt Inlets Marine Provincial Park is a provincial park in British Columbia, Canada, that protects six separate sites along three inlets north of the city of Sechelt. The six sites are located at various locations on Sechelt Inlet and its two side arms, Salmon Inlet and Narrows Inlet. Established initially as a recreation area in 1980, it was converted to a park in 1999, consisting of approximately 140 hectares (350 acres) in total.

The park sites are only accessible by boat or floatplane, and are popular destinations for kayaking, paddling, scuba diving and viewing wildlife. Chaudière Artificial Reef is located near Kunechin Point, one of the six park sites. Sunk in 1992, HMCS Chaudière was the first Canadian Destroyer sunk for use as an artificial reef.

== Geography ==
The six individual sites within the park are:

Site	Location description	Coordinates
Halfway Beach	West side of Sechelt Inlet	49°35′54″N 123°49′15″W
Thornhill Creek	South side of Salmon Inlet	49°39′21″N 123°36′32″W
Kunechin Point	North side of the junction of Sechelt and Salmon Inlets	49°37′48″N 123°48′15″W
Tzoonie Narrows	On Narrows Inlet	49°42′29″N 123°46′56″W
Piper Point	West side of Sechelt Inlet	49°32′40″N 123°47′59″W
Skaiakos Point	West side of Sechelt Inlet	49°35′01″N 123°49′01″W

== See also ==
- HMCS Chaudière (DDE 235)
- Mount Richardson Provincial Park
- Skookumchuck Narrows Provincial Park
- Spipiyus Provincial Park
- List of British Columbia provincial parks
