= Callitropsis =

The genus name Callitropsis has been used for two different genera in the family Cupressaceae:

- Callitropsis Oerst., a monotypic genus with a single species Callitropsis nootkatensis
- Callitropsis Compton, a synonym of Callitris
