= Clowhom Lake =

Reservoir in British Columbia, Canada

- Location within British Columbia
- Location: British Columbia
- Coordinates: 49°45′00″N 123°30′00″W
- Type: reservoir
- Primary inflows: Clowhom River
- Primary outflows: Clowhom River
- Basin countries: Canada
- Average depth: 44 feet (13 m)
- Water volume: 0.1 cubic kilometres (0.024 cu mi)
- Residence time: 53 days
- Shore length^{1}: 26 kilometres (16 mi)
- Surface elevation: 51 metres (167 ft) (168 ft)
- ^{1} Shore length is not a well-defined measure.

Clowhom Lake is a reservoir in the Sechelt Inlet basin, located on the Clowhom River at the upper end of Salmon Inlet, the southern side-inlet of Sechelt Inlet. Formed by Clowhom Dam, the reservoir was formerly two lakes, Upper Clowhom Lake and Lower Clowhom Lake, and had been referred to prior to their merger from inundation as the Clowhom Lakes.

== Climate ==
Climate data for Clowhom Falls (1971–2000)
Month	Jan	Feb	Mar	Apr	May	Jun	Jul	Aug	Sep	Oct	Nov	Dec	Year
Record high °C (°F)	15.0 (59.0)	16.0 (60.8)	20.0 (68.0)	25.0 (77.0)	31.0 (87.8)	35.0 (95.0)	35.5 (95.9)	36.0 (96.8)	31.1 (88.0)	28.0 (82.4)	16.7 (62.1)	15.0 (59.0)	36.0 (96.8)
Mean daily maximum °C (°F)	4.6 (40.3)	6.9 (44.4)	9.8 (49.6)	13.1 (55.6)	16.8 (62.2)	19.8 (67.6)	23.0 (73.4)	23.8 (74.8)	19.4 (66.9)	13.7 (56.7)	7.5 (45.5)	5.0 (41.0)	13.6 (56.5)
Daily mean °C (°F)	2.1 (35.8)	4.0 (39.2)	5.9 (42.6)	8.5 (47.3)	11.8 (53.2)	14.8 (58.6)	17.5 (63.5)	18.2 (64.8)	14.7 (58.5)	10.1 (50.2)	5.1 (41.2)	2.8 (37.0)	9.6 (49.3)
Mean daily minimum °C (°F)	−0.4 (31.3)	1.0 (33.8)	1.9 (35.4)	3.8 (38.8)	6.7 (44.1)	9.7 (49.5)	11.9 (53.4)	12.7 (54.9)	9.9 (49.8)	6.4 (43.5)	2.6 (36.7)	0.5 (32.9)	5.6 (42.0)
Record low °C (°F)	−12.2 (10.0)	−12.0 (10.4)	−6.1 (21.0)	−2.2 (28.0)	−0.6 (30.9)	3.3 (37.9)	4.4 (39.9)	5.6 (42.1)	0.6 (33.1)	−4.0 (24.8)	−11.5 (11.3)	−13.0 (8.6)	−13.0 (8.6)
Average precipitation mm (inches)	256.4 (10.09)	256.4 (10.09)	223.5 (8.80)	138.1 (5.44)	130.1 (5.12)	91.8 (3.61)	63.9 (2.52)	64.2 (2.53)	120.9 (4.76)	247.4 (9.74)	344.6 (13.57)	305.0 (12.01)	2,242.3 (88.28)
Average snowfall cm (inches)	23.0 (9.1)	14.1 (5.6)	3.3 (1.3)	0.7 (0.3)	0.0 (0.0)	0.0 (0.0)	0.0 (0.0)	0.0 (0.0)	0.0 (0.0)	0.3 (0.1)	3.2 (1.3)	14.3 (5.6)	58.9 (23.3)
Average precipitation days (≥ 0.2 mm)	19.4	17.8	18.0	16.3	15.7	13.1	8.7	9.7	12.1	16.2	20.1	19.2	186.3
Average snowy days (≥ 0.2 cm)	2.8	1.8	0.85	0.10	0.0	0.0	0.0	0.0	0.0	0.05	0.85	2.6	9.05
Source: Environment and Climate Change Canada

== See also ==
- List of lakes of British Columbia
