= Browsing (herbivory) =

Type of herbivory

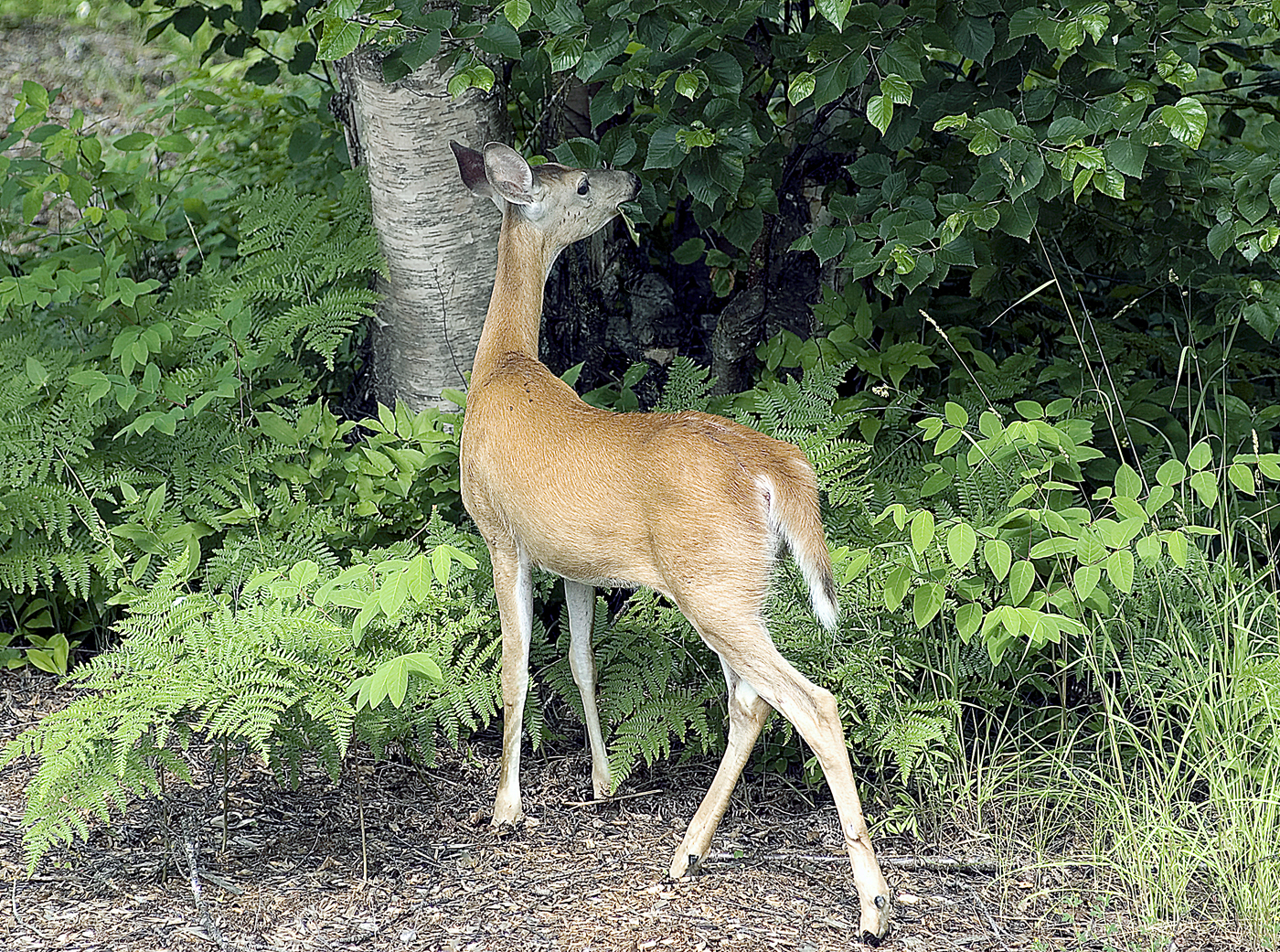
White-tailed deer browsing on leaves in Enderby, British Columbia

Browsing is a type of herbivory in which a herbivore (or, more narrowly defined, a folivore) feeds on leaves, soft shoots, or fruits of high-growing, generally woody plants such as shrubs. This is contrasted with grazing, usually associated with animals feeding on grass or other lower vegetations. Alternatively, grazers are animals eating mainly grass, and browsers are animals eating mainly non-grasses, which include both woody and herbaceous dicots. In either case, an example of this dichotomy are goats (which are primarily browsers) and sheep (which are primarily grazers).

== Browse ==
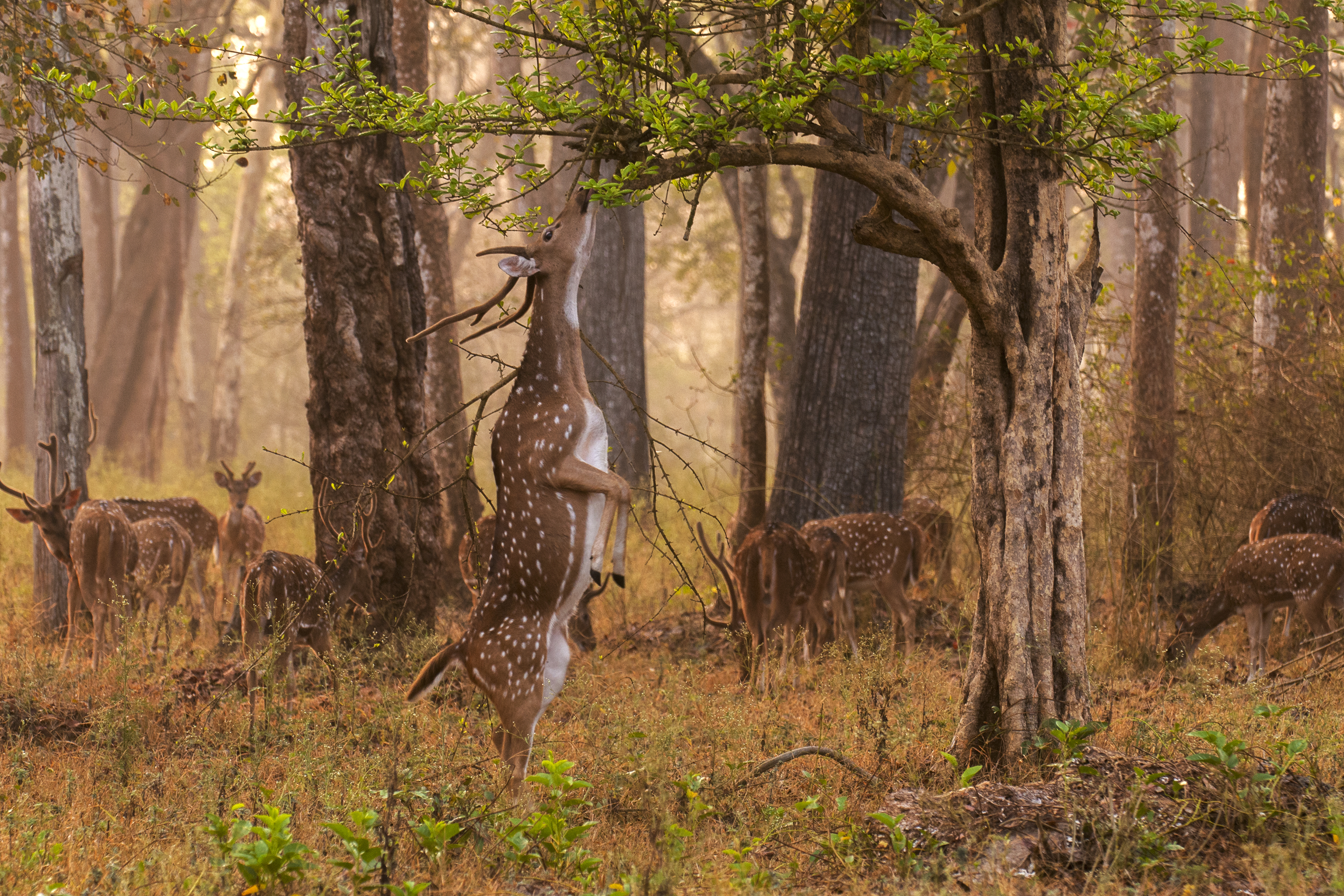
Browsing chital in Nagarhole (Karnataka, India)

The plant material eaten is known as browse and is in nature taken directly from the plant, though owners of livestock such as goats and deer may cut twigs or branches for feeding to their stock. In temperate regions, owners take browse before leaf fall, then dry and store it as a winter feed supplement. In time of drought, herdsmen may cut branches from beyond the reach of their stock, as forage at ground level. In the tropical regions, where population pressure leads owners to resort to this more often, there is a danger of permanent depletion of the supply. Animals in captivity may be fed browse as a replacement for their wild food sources; in the case of pandas, the browse may consist of bunches of banana leaves, bamboo shoots, slender pine, spruce, fir and willow branches, straw and native grasses.

If the population of browsers grows too high, all of the browse that they can reach may be devoured. The resulting level below which few or no leaves are found is known as the browse line. If over-browsing continues for too long, the ability of the ecosystem's trees to reproduce may be impaired, as young plants cannot survive long enough to grow too tall for browsers to reach.

== Overbrowsing ==
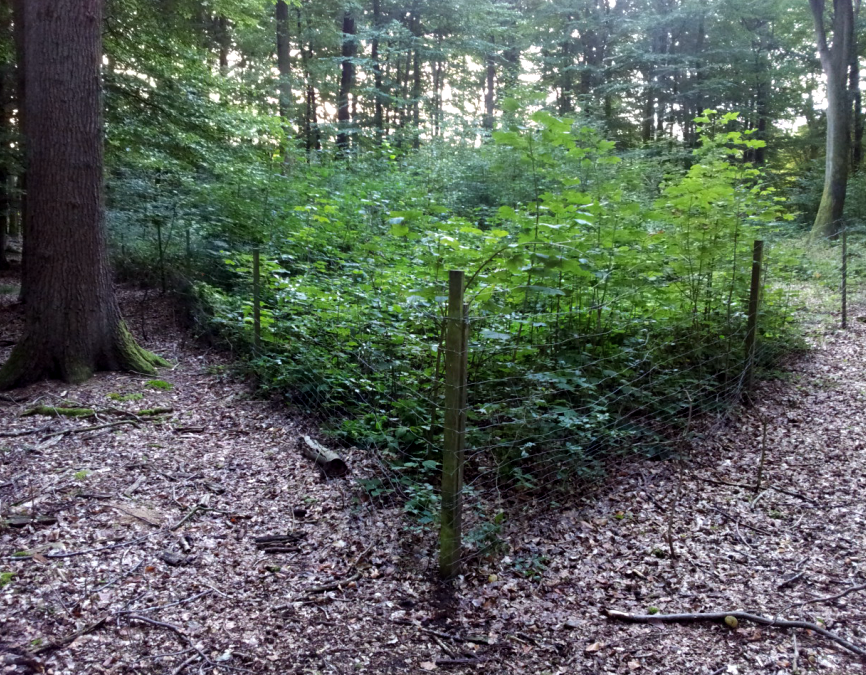
Control fence to assess the impact of browsing by ungulates – outside the fencing, there is a lack of natural forest regeneration

Overbrowsing occurs when overpopulated or densely-concentrated herbivores exert extreme pressure on plants, reducing the carrying capacity and altering the ecological functions of their habitat. Examples of overbrowsing herbivores around the world include koalas in Southern Australia, introduced mammals in New Zealand, and cervids in forests of North America and Europe.

=== Overview ===
Moose exclosures (fenced-off areas) are used to determine the ecological impacts of cervids, allowing scientists to compare flora, fauna, and soil in areas inside and outside of exclosures. Changes in plant communities in response to herbivory reflect the differential palatability of plants to the overabundant herbivore, as well as the variable ability of plants to tolerate high levels of browsing. The heights of plants preferred by herbivores can give indications of the local and regional herbivore density. Compositional and structural changes in forest vegetation can have cascading effects on the entire ecosystem, including impacts on soil quality and stability, micro- and macro- invertebrates, small mammals, songbirds, and perhaps even large predators.

=== Causes ===
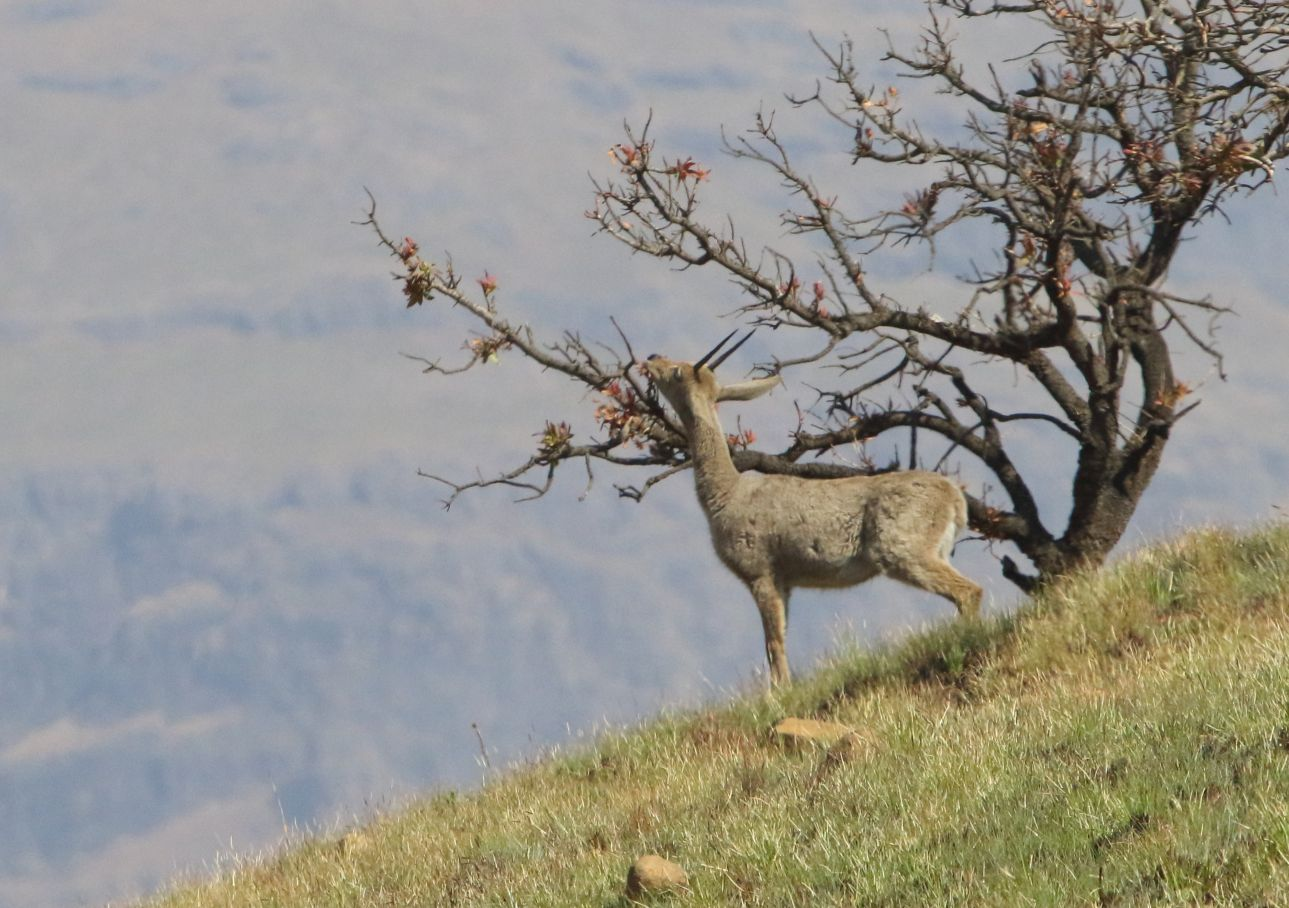
Browsing grey rhebok

There are several causes of overabundant herbivores and subsequent overbrowsing. Herbivores are introduced to landscapes in which native plants have not evolved to withstand browsing, and predators have not adapted to hunt the invading species. In other cases, populations of herbivores exceed historic levels due to reduced hunting or predation pressure. For example, carnivores declined in North America throughout the 19th century and hunting regulations became stricter, contributing to increased cervid populations across North America. Also, landscape changes due to human development, such as in agriculture and forestry, can produce fragmented forest patches between which deer travel, browsing in early successional habitat at the periphery. Agricultural fields and young silvicultural stands provide deer with high quality food leading to overabundance and increased browsing pressure on forest understory plants.

=== Impacts on plants ===
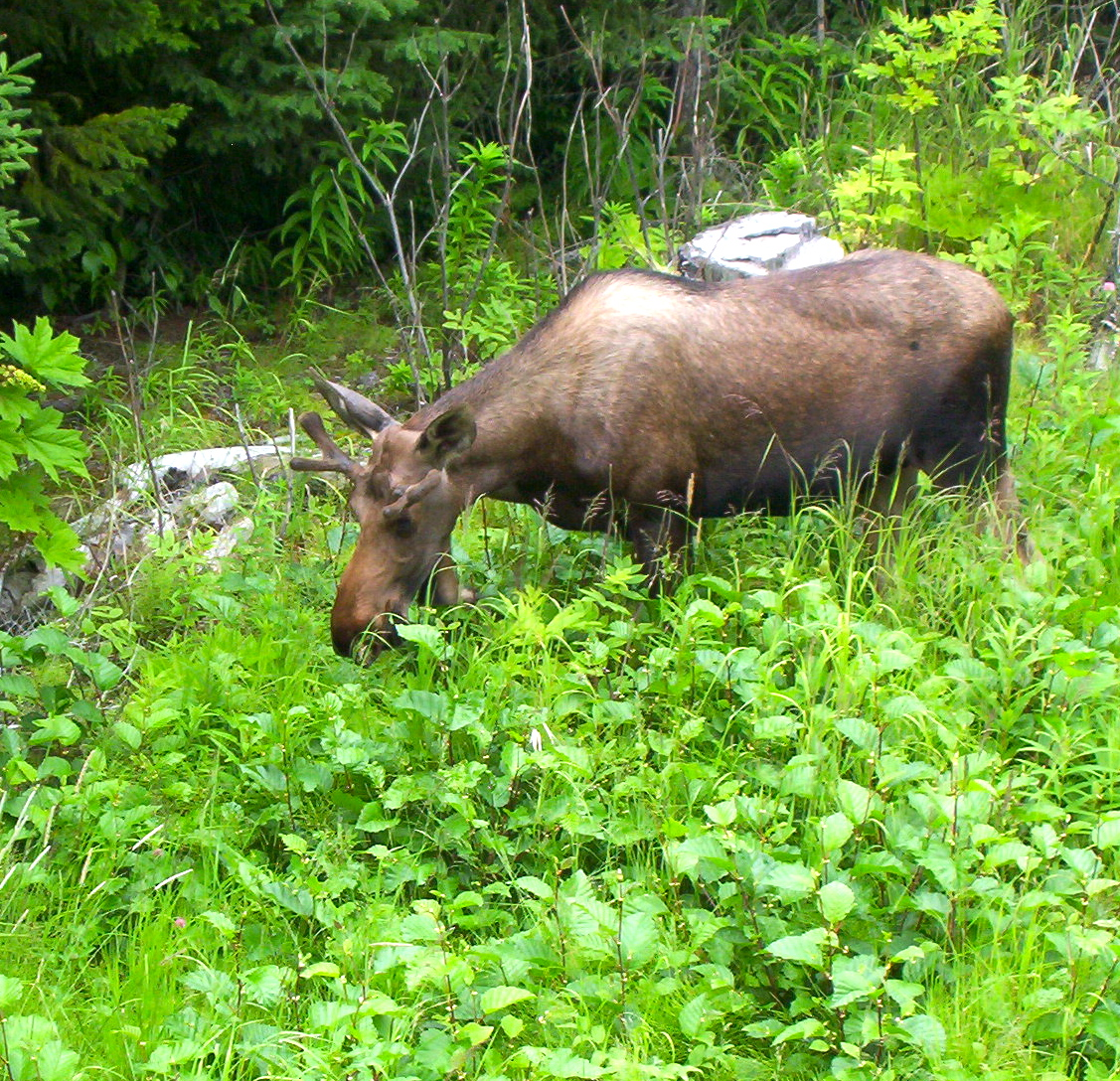
Young Alaska moose browsing on alders

Overbrowsing impacts plants at individual, population, and community levels. The negative effects of browsing are greater among intolerant species, such as members of the genus Trillium, which have all photosynthetic tissues and reproductive organs at the apex of a singular stem. This means that a deer may eat all the reproductive and photosynthetic tissues at once, reducing the plant's height, photosynthetic capabilities, and reproductive output. This is one example of how overbrowsing can lead to the loss of reproductive individuals in a population, and a lack of recruitment of young plants. Plants also differ in their palatability to herbivores. At high densities of herbivores, plants that are highly selected as browse may be missing small and large individuals from the population. At the community level, intense browsing by deer in forests leads to reductions in the abundance of palatable understory herbaceous shrubs, and increases in graminoid and bryophyte abundance which are released from competition for light.

==== Browsing Pressure and Plant Palatability ====
The intensity of browsing pressure often varies depending on the palatability of plant species to herbivores. Some plant species may be heavily browsed due to their high palatability, while others may be avoided or less affected.

==== Effects on Plant Reproduction ====
Browsing can affect plant reproduction by reducing the availability of leaves for photosynthesis and flowers for pollination. Overbrowsing can lead to a decrease in seed production, hinder the recruitment of new individuals and alter the genetic diversity of plant population.

=== Impacts on other animals ===
Overbrowsing can change near-ground forest structure, plant species composition, vegetation density, and leaf litter, with consequences for other forest-dwelling animals. Many species of ground-dwelling invertebrates rely on near-ground vegetation cover and leaf litter layers for habitat; these invertebrates may be lost from areas with intense browsing. Further, preferential selection of certain plant species by herbivores can impact invertebrates closely associated with those plants. Migratory forest-dwelling songbirds depend on dense understory vegetation for nesting and foraging habitat; reductions in understory plant biomass caused by deer can lead to declines in forest songbird populations. Finally, loss of understory plant diversity associated with ungulate overbrowsing can impact small mammals that rely on this vegetation for cover and food.

=== Management and recovery ===
Overbrowsing can lead plant communities towards equilibrium states which are only reversible if herbivore numbers are greatly reduced for a sufficient period, and actions are taken to restore the original plant communities. Management to reduce deer populations has a three-method approach: (1) large areas of contiguous old forest with closed canopies are set aside, (2) predator populations are increased, and (3) hunting of the overabundant herbivore is increased. Encouragement of tree recovery by promoting seed sources of native trees is an important aspect of managing recovery from overbrowsing. Refugia in the form of windthrow mounds, rocky outcrops, or horizontal logs elevated above the forest floor can provide plants with substrate protected from browsing by cervids. These refugia can contain a proportion of the plant community that would exist without browsing pressure, and may differ significantly from the flora found in nearby browsed areas. If management efforts were to reduce cervid populations in the landscape, these refugia could serve as a model for understory recovery in the surrounding plant community.

== See also ==
- Consumer–resource interactions
- Silvopasture
- Tree shelter
- Yellow-cedar decline
