= Tzoonie River =

- Mouth of Tzoonie River

Location
- Country: Canada
- Province: British Columbia
- District: New Westminster Land District

Physical characteristics
- Source: Tzoonie Lake
  - location: West of Mount Jimmy Jimmy
  - coordinates: 49°54′34″N 123°34′24″W
  - elevation: 1,346 m (4,416 ft)
- Mouth: Narrows Inlet
  - location: West of Squamish
  - coordinates: 49°47′04″N 123°43′26″W
  - elevation: 0 m (0 ft)

The Tzoonie River is a remote, short river that enters the head of the Narrows Inlet about 36.6 km north of Sechelt, British Columbia.

== Course ==
The Tzoonie River originates at the outlet of Tzoonie Lake, a remote lake about 6.3 km west of Mount Jimmy Jimmy and 5.5 km north of Tzoonie Mountain. The river drops steeply from the lake's outlet, with a major waterfall possibly just below the lake. It flows southwest for about 3.9 km until it enters an unnamed lake. From the outlet of that lake, it continues southwest for about 7.4 km to its confluence with one of its two named tributaries, Chickwat Creek, where it turns south. From there, it flows south for about 5.5 km to its mouth at the head of the Narrows Inlet.

== Tributaries ==
- Tyson Creek: Flows northwest from the Tyson Lakes to meet with the Tzoonie about 0.4 km above the mouth of Chickwat Creek.
- Chickwat Creek: Meets the river about 0.4 km below the mouth of Tyson Creek.

== See also ==
- List of rivers of British Columbia
- Sechelt Inlet
