= Spipiyus Provincial Park =

Provincial park in British Columbia, Canada

Spipiyus Lake Provincial Park
- IUCN category II (national park)
- Location within British Columbia
- Interactive map of Spipiyus Lake Provincial Park
- Location: British Columbia, Canada
- Nearest city: Sechelt
- Coordinates: 49°39′43″N 123°55′16″W
- Area: 29.79 km^{2} (11.50 sq mi)
- Established: June 28, 1999
- Governing body: BC Parks

Spipiyus Provincial Park (also known as the Caren Range) is a 29.79 square kilometres (11.50 sq mi) provincial park in British Columbia, Canada. The park is north of Halfmoon Bay on the Sechelt Peninsula. It protects pockets of old-growth forest that are habitat for the marbled murrelet.

== Major attractions ==
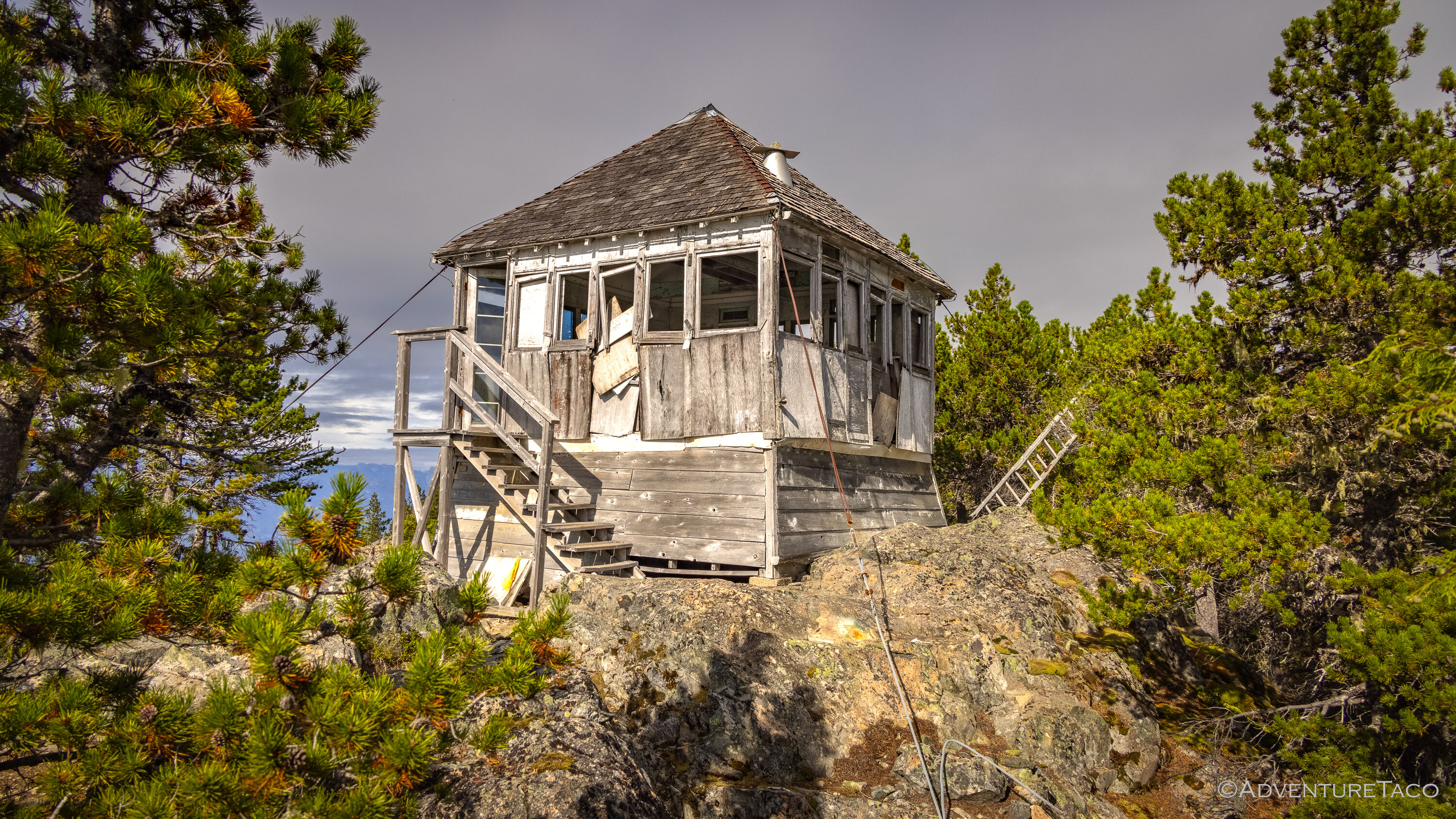
Historic fire lookout tower on Mount Hallowell in Spipiyus Provincial Park.

The park contains more than 55 kilometres (34 mi) of high-clearance 4WD trails that circumnavigate the higher elevations, allowing access to hiking trails, lakes, and views of Pender Harbour, the Strait of Georgia and Vancouver Island.

=== Hiking ===
The park features two peaks over 1,200 metres (3,900 ft), Mount Hallowell at 1,228 metres (4,029 ft), and Spipiyus Peak at 1,259 metres (4,131 ft)

The 1.5 kilometres (0.93 mi) trail to the summit of Mount Hallowell is well-maintained and ends at the historic Mount Hallowell Fire Lookout Tower. Views from the summit include Pender Harbour, the Strait of Georgia and Vancouver Island.

Much of the 0.8 kilometres (0.50 mi) trail to the summit of Spipiyus Peak (also known as Caren Peak) is not maintained and requires bushwacking. Views of Narrows Inlet that were once visible from the summit are now blocked by trees.

=== Driving ===
A single road, the Halfmoon-Carlson Forest Service Road, traverses the upper elevations of the park. Once used for logging operations, the road branches to many historic logging platforms with views of the Sechelt Inlet, Narrows Inlet, the Strait of Georgia, Vancouver Island, and Sakinaw Lake. A high-clearance, 4WD vehicle is required to navigate this road.
