= Mount Ossa =

Mount Ossa may refer to:

- Mount Ossa (Greece), a mountain in Greece also known as Kissavos
- Mount Ossa (Tasmania), a mountain in Tasmania
- Mount Ossa, Queensland, a locality in Queensland
- Mount Ossa National Park, a park in Queensland

== See also ==
- Ossa Mountain, a summit in British Columbia, Canada
