= Salmon Inlet =

Fjord in British Columbia

Coordinates: 49°38′46″N 123°41′19″W

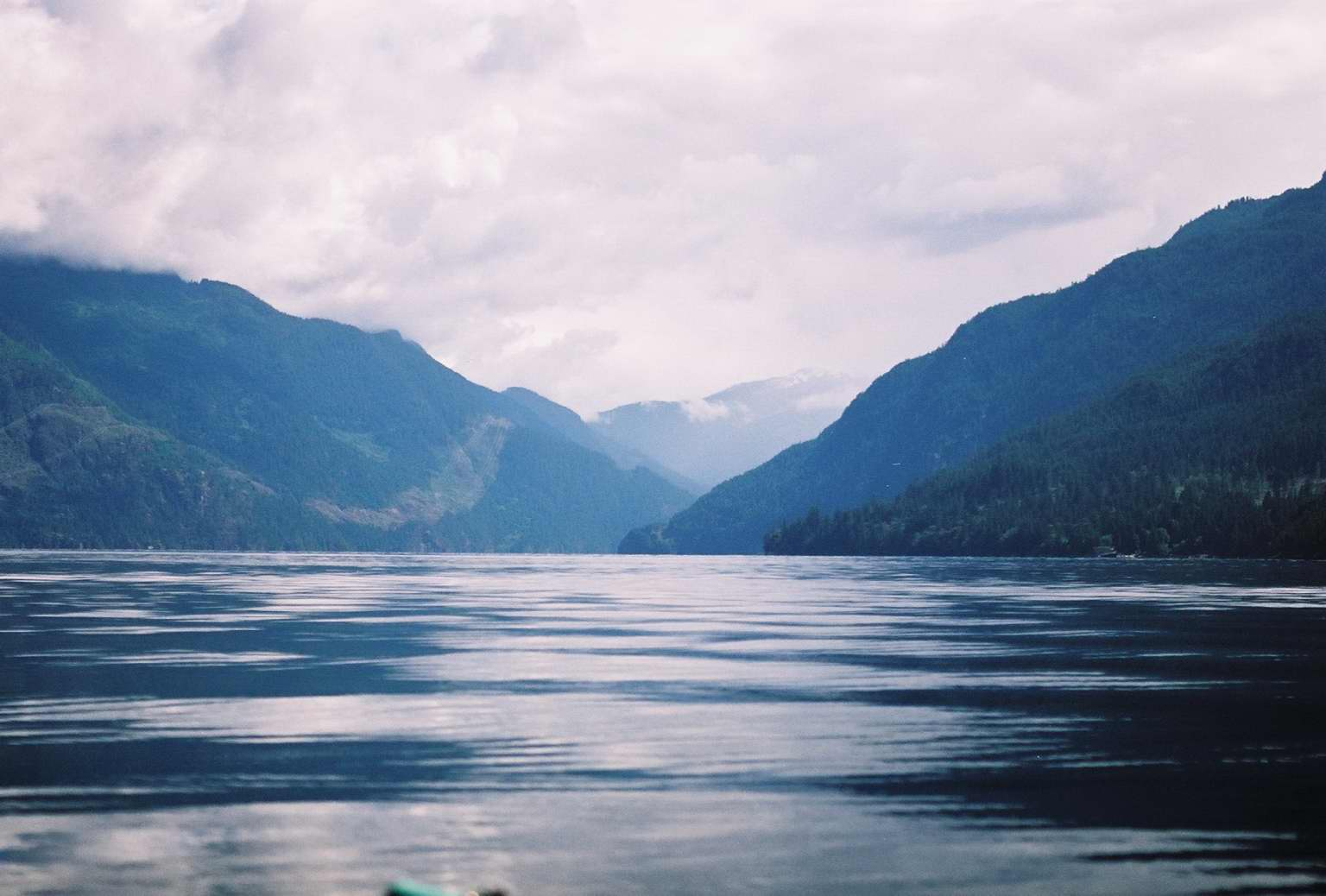
Looking up Salmon Inlet from Sechelt Inlet

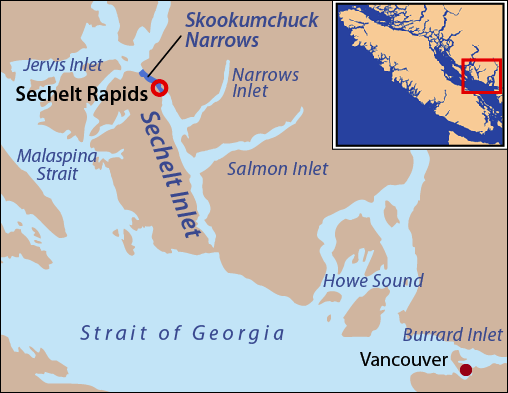
Sechelt Inlet with Salmon Inlet in centre

Salmon Inlet, formerly Salmon Arm, is a fjord branching east from Sechelt Inlet in British Columbia, Canada. Its companion, Narrows Inlet, another side-inlet of Sechelt Inlet, lies roughly 10 km (6.2 mi) north. Misery and Sechelt Creeks flow freely into the inlet, while the Clowhom River flows in from the artificial Clowhom Lake, formed by a small hydroelectric power development. The fjord is 23 km (14 mi) long; Clowhom Lake, covering a waterfall on the Clowhom River, stretches a further 12 km (7.5 mi) to the western base of Mount Tantalus, which is best known from the direction of Squamish and the Cheakamus Canyon stretch of British Columbia Highway 99. Heavily affected by logging and milling operations, the inlet is split almost into two portions by an alluvial fan spreading from the mouth of Sechelt Creek.

== See also ==
- Sechelt Inlets Marine Provincial Park
