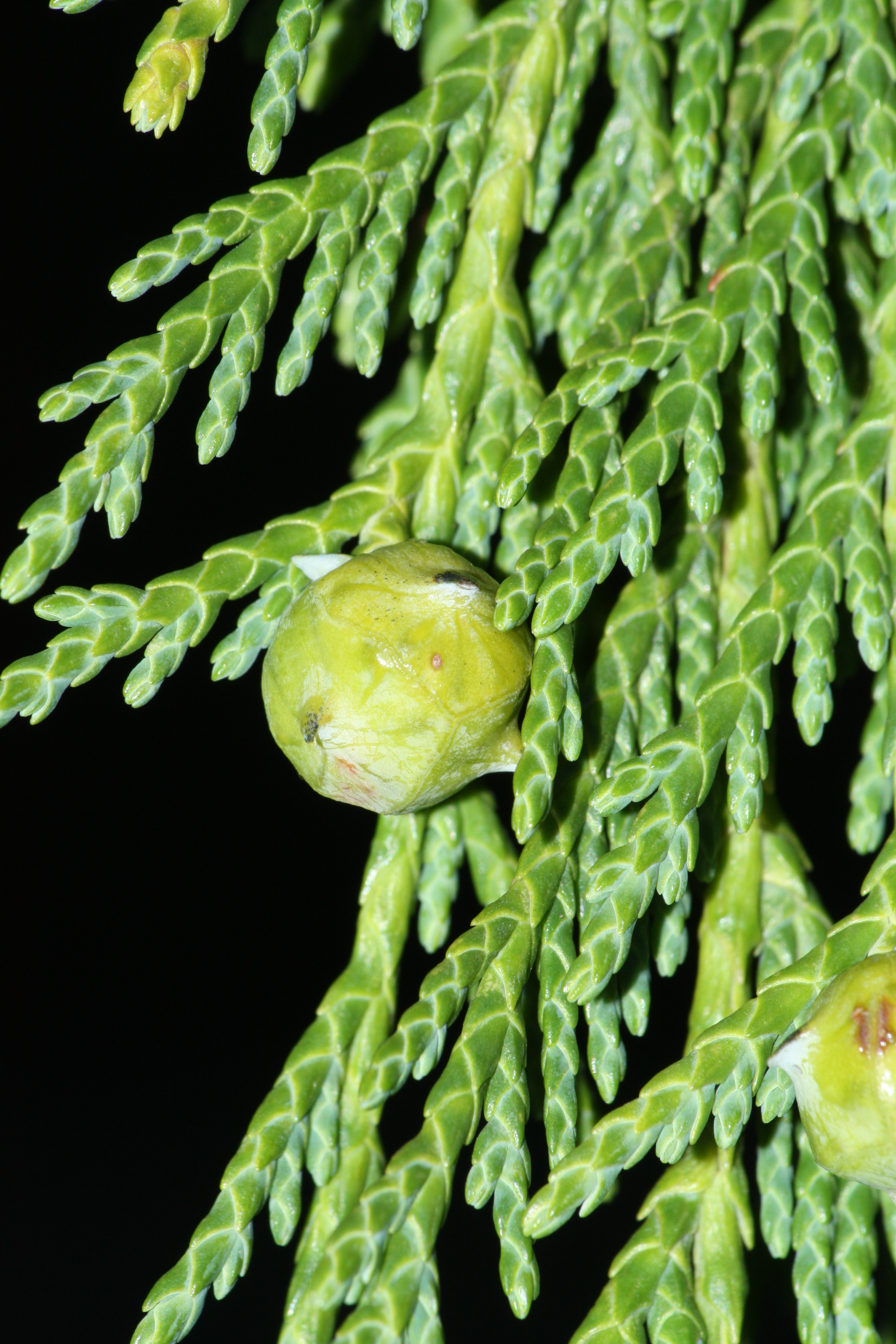
- Foliage and green cone, Mount Rainier National Park

Conservation status
- Least Concern (IUCN 3.1)

- Apparently Secure (NatureServe)

Scientific classification
- Kingdom: Plantae
- Clade: Tracheophytes
- Clade: Gymnosperms
- Division: Pinophyta
- Class: Pinopsida
- Order: Cupressales
- Family: Cupressaceae
- Genus: Callitropsis; Oerst.
- Species: C. nootkatensis

Binomial name
- Callitropsis nootkatensis (D.Don) Oerst.
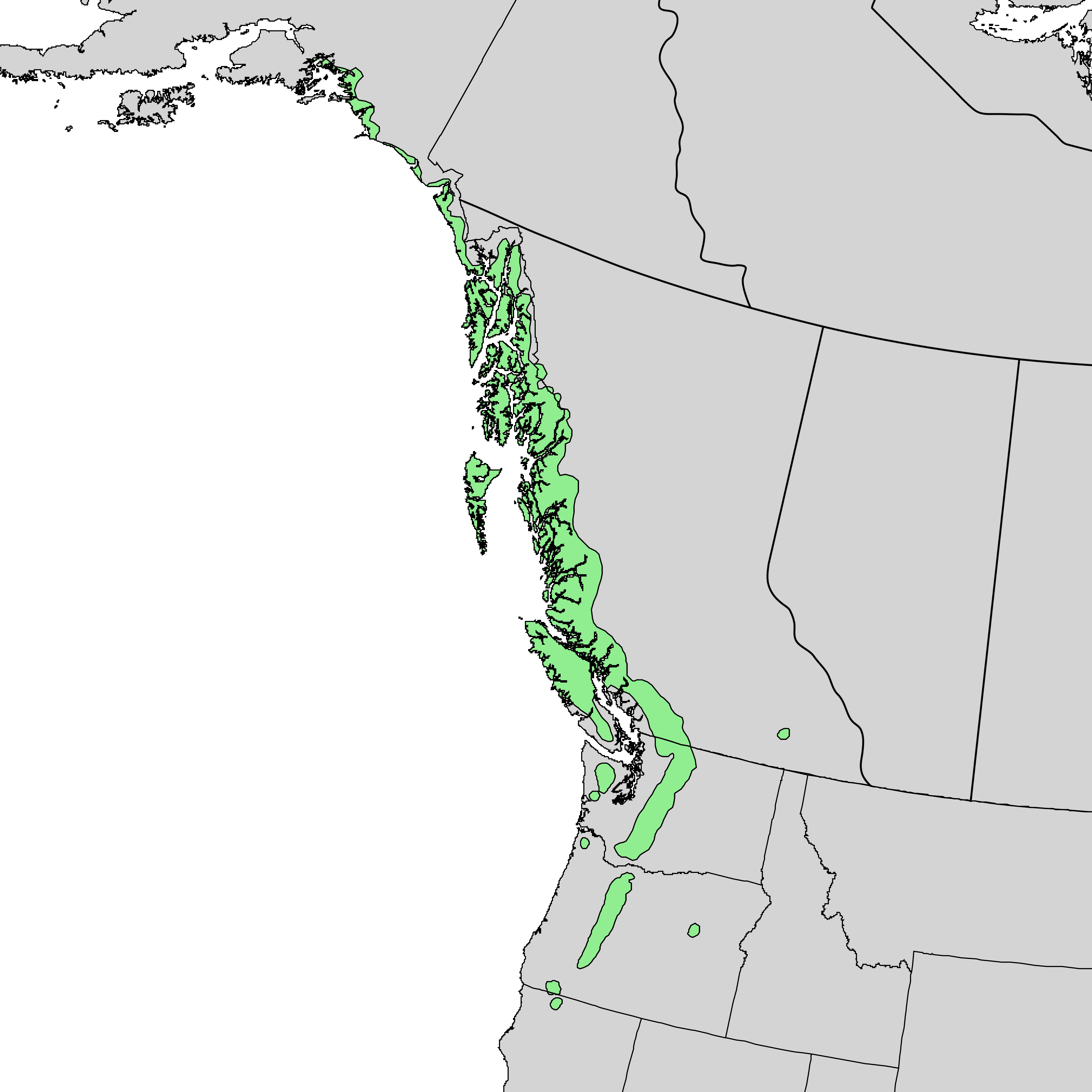
- Natural range of Callitropsis nootkatensis

Synonyms
- Callitropsis nootkatensis (D.Don) Oerst. ex D.P.Little; Callitropsis nootkatensis (D. Don) Florin; Chamaecyparis nootkatensis (D. Don) Sudw.; Chamaecyparis nootkatensis (D.Don) Spach; Chamaecyparis nutkaensis Lindl. & Gordon; Cupressus americana Trautv.; Cupressus nootkatensis D.Don; Cupressus nutkatensis Hook.; Thuja excelsa Bong.; Thujopsis borealis Carrière; Thujopsis cupressoides Carrière; Thujopsis tchugatskoyae Carrière; Xanthocyparis nootkatensis (D.Don) Farjon & D.K.Harder

= Callitropsis nootkatensis =

Species of conifer

Callitropsis nootkatensis is a species of coniferous tree in the cypress family, Cupressaceae, native to the coastal regions of northwestern North America. It is the sole species in the monotypic genus Callitropsis.

This species has many common names, including: Nootka cypress, yellow cypress, Alaska cypress, Nootka cedar, yellow cedar, Alaska cedar, and Alaska yellow cedar. The specific epithet nootkatensis is derived from the species being from the area of Nootka Sound on the west coast of Vancouver Island, Canada. Both locations are named for the older European name Nootka, referring to the Nuu-chah-nulth First Nation.

== Description ==
Callitropsis nootkatensis is a coniferous tree that usually grows to 40 meters (131 ft) tall, and exceptionally to 60 m (200 ft), with diameters up to 3.4 to 4 m (11 to 13 ft). The bark is thin, smooth and purplish when young, turning flaky and gray. The branches are commonly pendulous, with foliage in flat sprays and dark green scale-leaves measuring 3–5 millimeters (1/8–3/16 in) long. The cones, maturing biannually, have 4 (occasionally 6) scales, and resemble the cones of Cupressus lusitanica (another species which can show foliage in flat sprays), except being somewhat smaller, typically 8–14 mm (5/16–9/16 in) in diameter; each scale has a pointed triangular bract about 1.5–2 mm long, again similar to other Cupressus and unlike the crescent-shaped, non-pointed bract on the scales of Chamaecyparis cones. The winged seeds are small, thus dispersing at a close range; additionally, only a small percentage is viable.

The Caren Range on the west coast of British Columbia is home to the oldest Nootka cypress specimens in the world, with one specimen found to be 1,834 years old; some specimens may be over 3,000 years old.

Callitropsis nootkatensis is one of the parents of the hybrid Leyland cypress; the other parent, Monterey cypress (Hesperocyparis macrocarpa), was also considered to be in the genus Cupressus, but in the North American Hesperocyparis clade, which has generally been found to be phylogenetically closer to C. nootkatensis than the Old World clade Cupressus sensu stricto.

== Taxonomy ==
First described in the genus Cupressus as Cupressus nootkatensis in 1824 based on a specimen collected "ad Sinum Nootka dictum", which translates to "said Bay of Nootka". It was transferred to Chamaecyparis in 1841 on the basis of its foliage being in flattened sprays, as in other Chamaecyparis, but unlike most (though not all) other Cupressus species. However, this placement does not fit with the morphology and phenology of the cones, which are far more like Cupressus, maturing in two years rather than one. Genetic evidence, published by Gadek et al., strongly supported its return to Cupressus and exclusion from Chamaecyparis.

Farjon et al. (2002) transferred it to a new genus Xanthocyparis, together with the newly discovered Vietnamese golden cypress (Xanthocyparis vietnamensis); this species is remarkably similar to Nootka cypress and the treatment has many arguments in its favour, as while they are not related to Chamaecyparis, neither do they fit fully in Cupressus despite the many similarities. Little et al. confirmed this relationship with further evidence and pointed out that an earlier nomenclatural combination in the genus Callitropsis existed, as Callitropsis nootkatensis (D.Don) Oerst., published in 1864 but overlooked or ignored by other subsequent authors. Little et al. therefore synonymised Xanthocyparis with Callitropsis, the correct name for these species under the ICBN when treated in a distinct genus. The name Xanthocyparis has now been proposed for conservation, and the 2011 International Botanical Congress followed that recommendation.

In 2010, Mao et al. performed a more detailed molecular analysis and placed Nootka cypress back in Cupressus. This was disputed, as the tree would compose a monophyletic subgenus, but the Gymnosperm Database suggested that it could comprise a monotypic genus as Callitropsis nootkatensis. In 2021, a molecular study by Stull et al. found the species to indeed belong to the distinct genus Callitropsis and recovered this as the sister genus to Hesperocyparis. The clade comprising both was found to be sister to Xanthocyparis (containing only the Vietnamese golden cypress), and the clade containing the three genera was found to be sister to a clade containing Juniperus and Cupressus sensu stricto.

== Distribution and habitat ==
The species grows in moist areas of coastal mountains of the Pacific Northwest, including those of the Cascades, from the Kenai Peninsula in Alaska to the Klamath Mountains in northernmost California. It can be found at elevations higher than those reached by Thuja plicata (western redcedar), sometimes in a krummholz form, and even occupying very rocky sites (near the California-Oregon border). It can be found at elevations of 600 to 750 m (1,970 to 2,460 ft) in Southeast Alaska and between 750 and 2,000 m (2,460 and 6,560 ft) from coastal British Columbia into Oregon. Isolated groves near Nelson, British Columbia, and John Day, Oregon, may be the descendants of local populations dating to the Last Glacial Period.

== Ecology ==
The tree benefits from annual precipitation exceeding 150 centimeters (59 in), particularly in deep snow though with temperatures not often dropping below −18 °C (0 °F). Snow tends not to break the flexible branches. It is shade tolerant, but less so than associated mountain hemlock (Tsuga mertensiana) and Pacific silver fir (Abies amabilis), and grows slowly. Anti-fungal chemicals within the tree aid in its longevity. It is also rarely afflicted by insects, although is susceptible to heart rot.

In Alaska, where the tree is primarily referred to as "yellow cedar", extensive research has been conducted into large-scale die-offs of yellow cedar stands. These studies have concluded that the tree has depended upon heavy coastal snowpacks to insulate its shallow roots from cold Arctic winters. The impacts of climate change have resulted in thinner, less-persistent snowpacks, in turn causing increased susceptibility to freeze damage. This mortality has been observed over 7% of the species range, covering approximately 10 degrees of latitude from northern southeast Alaska to southern British Columbia. Substantial future mortality is likely due to warming temperatures and decreasing snowpacks. The U.S. Fish & Wildlife Service is reviewing whether to designate the species as threatened or endangered.

== Uses ==
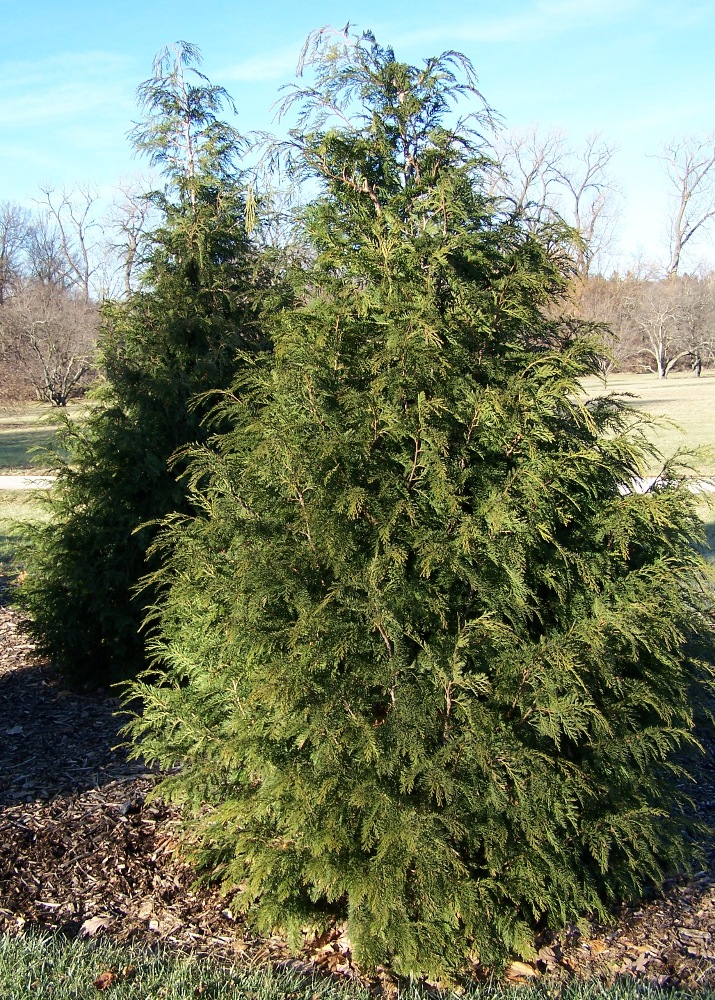
Cultivated specimens at Morton Arboretum

The Nootka cypress is used extensively by the indigenous peoples of the Pacific Northwest Coast, along with another cypress, Thuja plicata (western redcedar). While the wood and inner bark of western redcedar was preferred for larger projects like houses and canoes, the stronger inner bark of Nootka cypress was used for smaller vessels and utensils, including canoe paddles and baskets, as well as thread for clothing and blankets.

This species has been considered to be one of the finest timber trees in the world and has been exported to China during the last century. The wood has been used for flooring, interior finish and shipbuilding. The tree has extreme heartwood qualities that make it one of the most desired sources of firewood on the West Coast. It burns very hot and lasts a long time as embers. A tree can still be used for firewood up to 100 years after its death.

=== Construction ===
The various physical properties of the wood make it an attractive material for both general construction and boatbuilding. Due to its slow growth it is hard and, like other cypress woods, it is durable; it therefore offers good dimensional stability and is resistant to weather, insects, and contact with soil. It works easily with hand or machine tools, turning and carving quite well. It can be fastened with glues, screws, and nails. Nootka cypress's texture, uniform color, and straight grain will take a fine finish. It resists splintering and wears smoothly over time. When fresh cut it has a somewhat unpleasant bitter scent, but when seasoned it has barely any discernible odor, hence its traditional use in face masks.

Due to its expense, it is used mainly for finished carpentry. Typical uses include exterior siding, shingles, decking, exposed beams, glue-laminated beams, paneling, cabinetry, and millwork. In historic preservation it can be used as a substitute for Thuja plicata (western redcedar) and Taxodium distichum (bald cypress), due to current difficulties in obtaining quality timber of those species due to environmental concern and past over-exploitation, although this applies equally to Nootka cypress.

Other uses for Nootka cypress include saunas, and battery containers due to its resistance to acids. Traditionally, paddles, masks, dishes, and bows were made from the wood.

=== Landscaping ===
The drooping branchlets give the tree a graceful weeping appearance. It makes an attractive specimen tree in parks and open spaces. It can also be used as a tall hedge. It will grow in USDA plant hardiness zones 5–9, but can be difficult to grow. Best growth is in light or heavy soil, preferably well drained, and in climates with cool summers. It prefers semi-shade to full sun. It can also be used in bonsai.

Under the synonym Xanthocyparis nootkatensis the cultivar C. nootkatensis 'Pendula' has gained the Royal Horticultural Society's Award of Garden Merit.

== In Indigenous culture ==
A legend amongst the Nootka peoples of the Hesquiaht First Nation tells of the origins of the Nootka cypress. In the legend, a raven encounters three young women drying salmon on the beach. He asks the women if they are afraid of being alone, or of bears, wolves, and other animals. Each woman responded "no". But when asked about owls, the women were indeed afraid of owls. Hearing this, the trickster raven hid in the forests, and made the calls of an owl. The terrified women ran up the mountains, but turned into Nootka cypress trees when they were out of breath. According to the Nootka, this is why Nootka cypress grows on the sides of mountains, and also why the bark is silky like a woman's hair, and the young trunk is smooth like a woman's body.

In Tlingit culture the story of Natsilane describes how a Nootka cypress was used to carve the world's first killer whale.

== Gallery ==
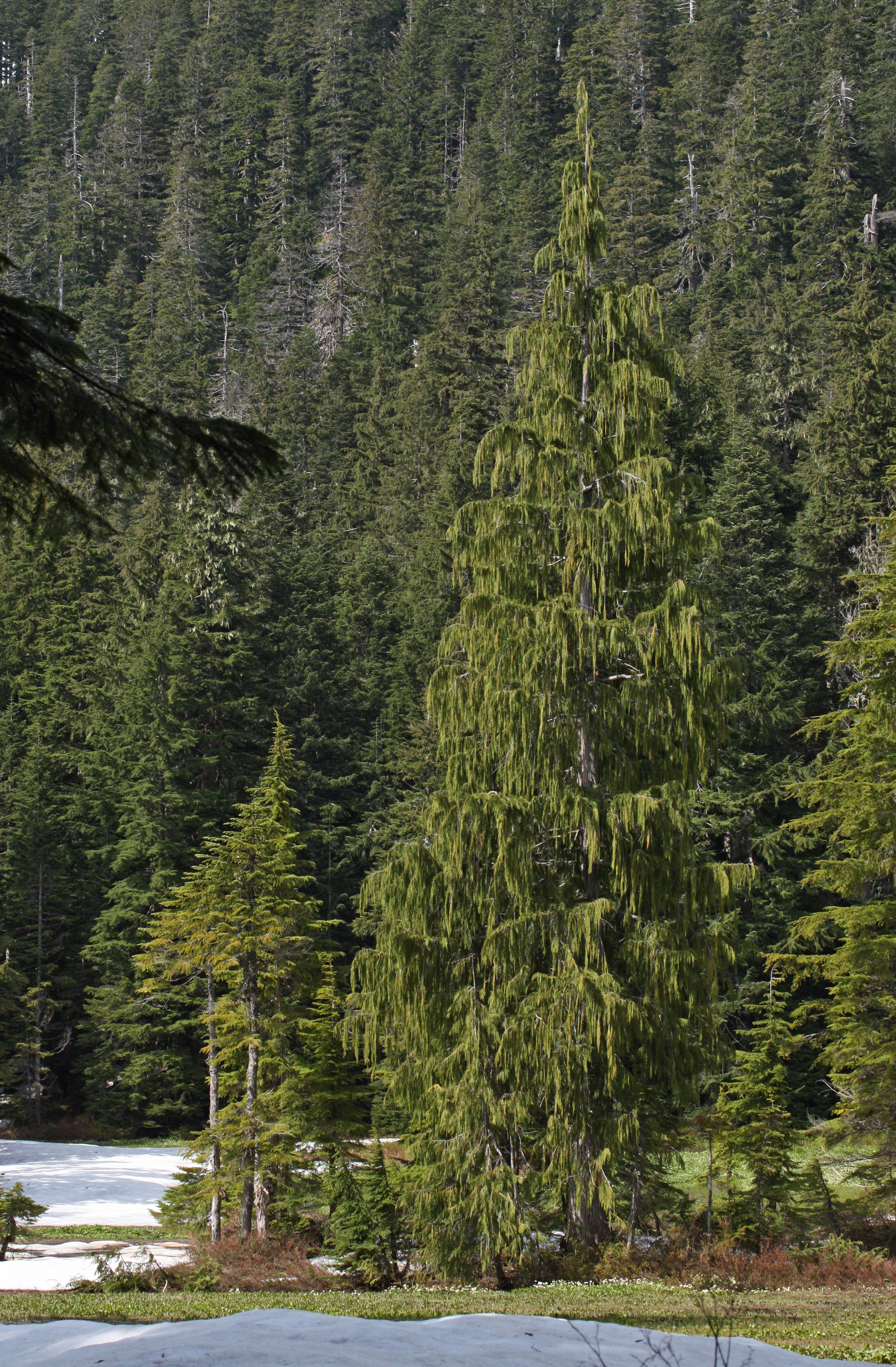
Mature individual with foliage in flat sprays hanging from branches

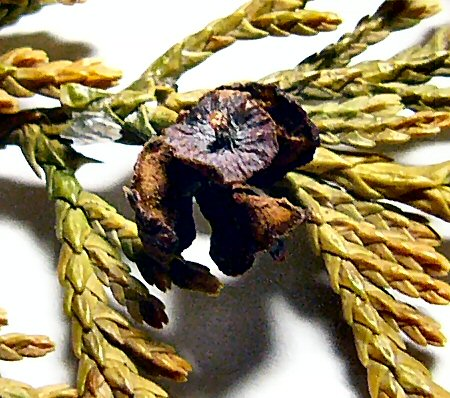
Cone detail

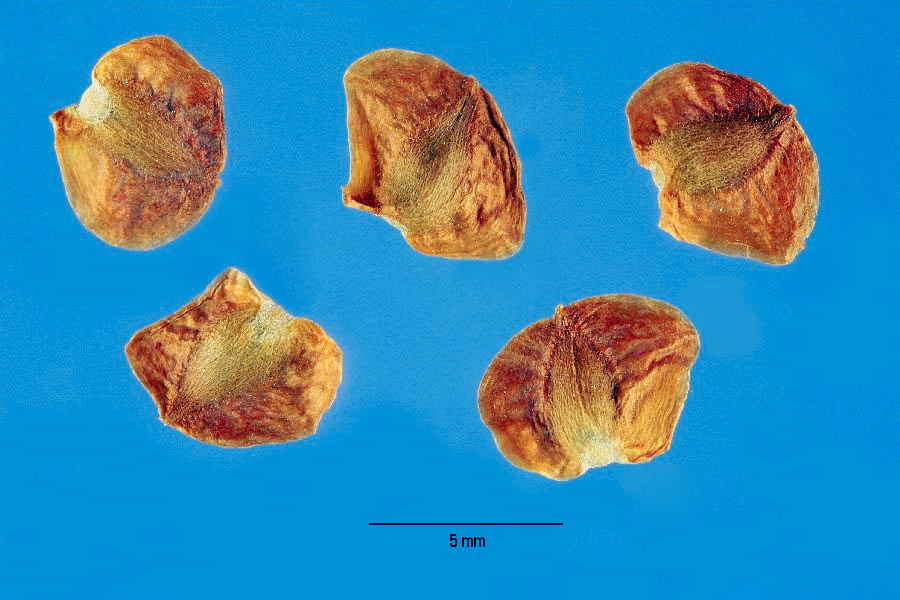
Seeds

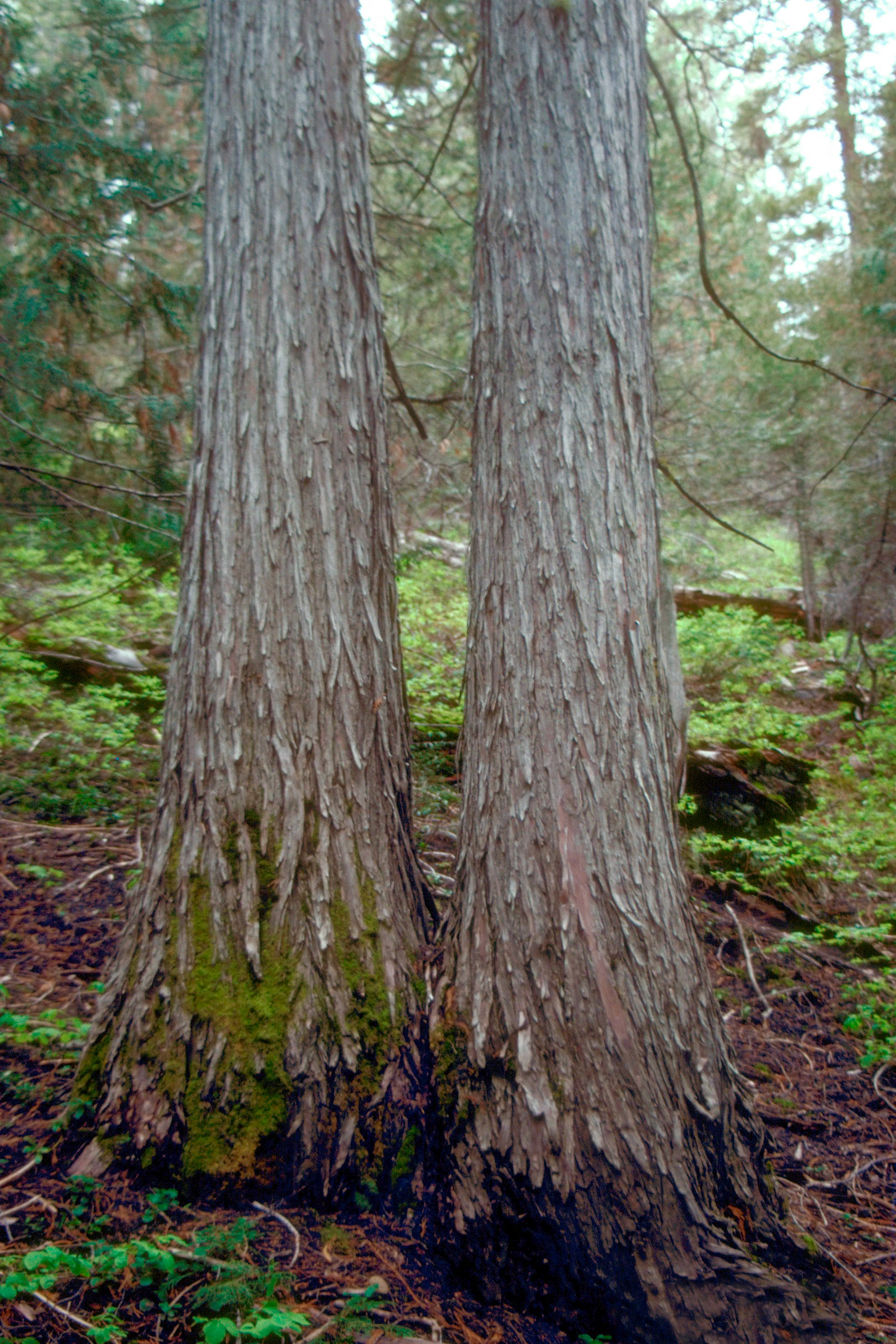
Bark

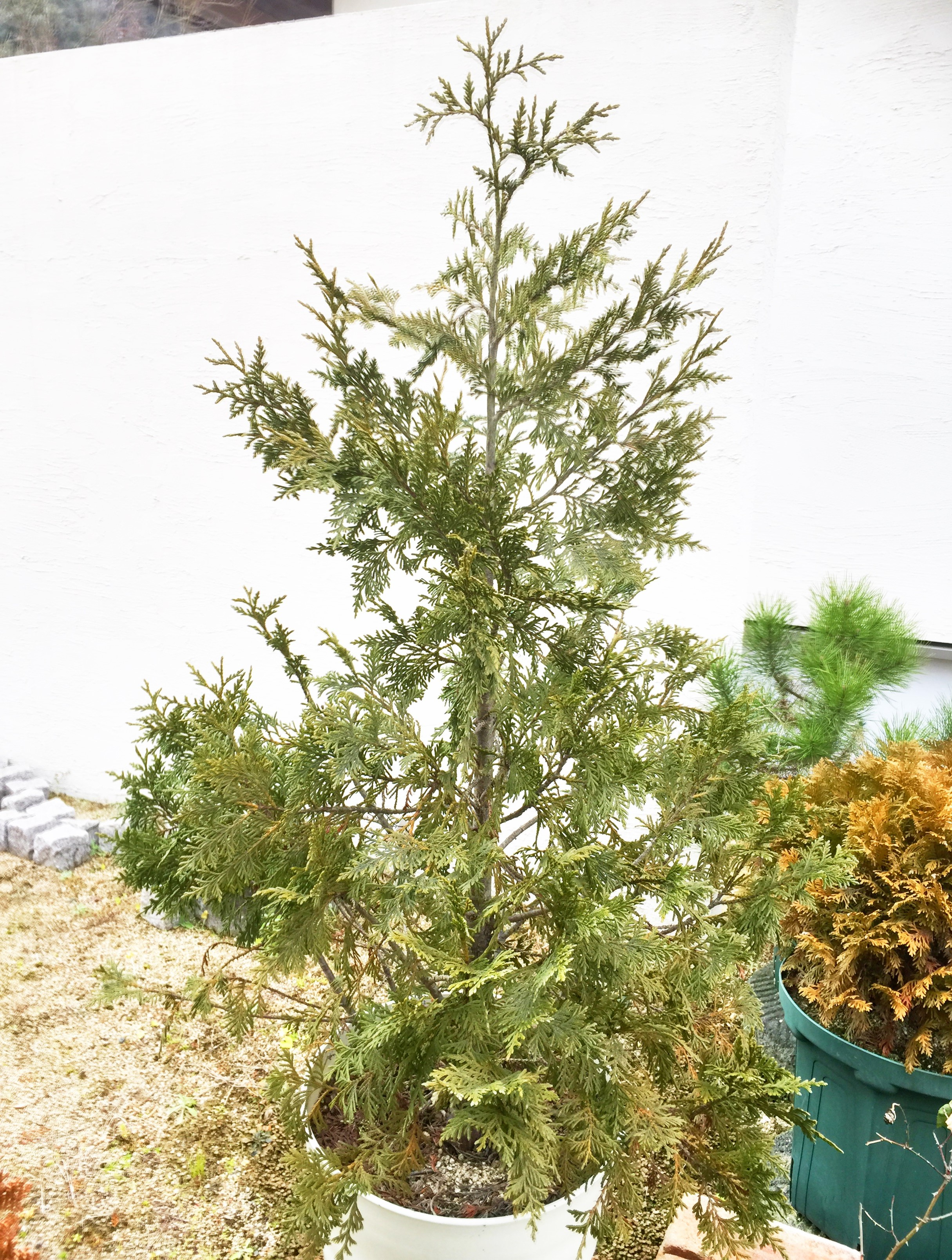
C. nootkatensis 'Glauca'
