= Mount Jimmy Jimmy =

Mountain in British Columbia, Canada

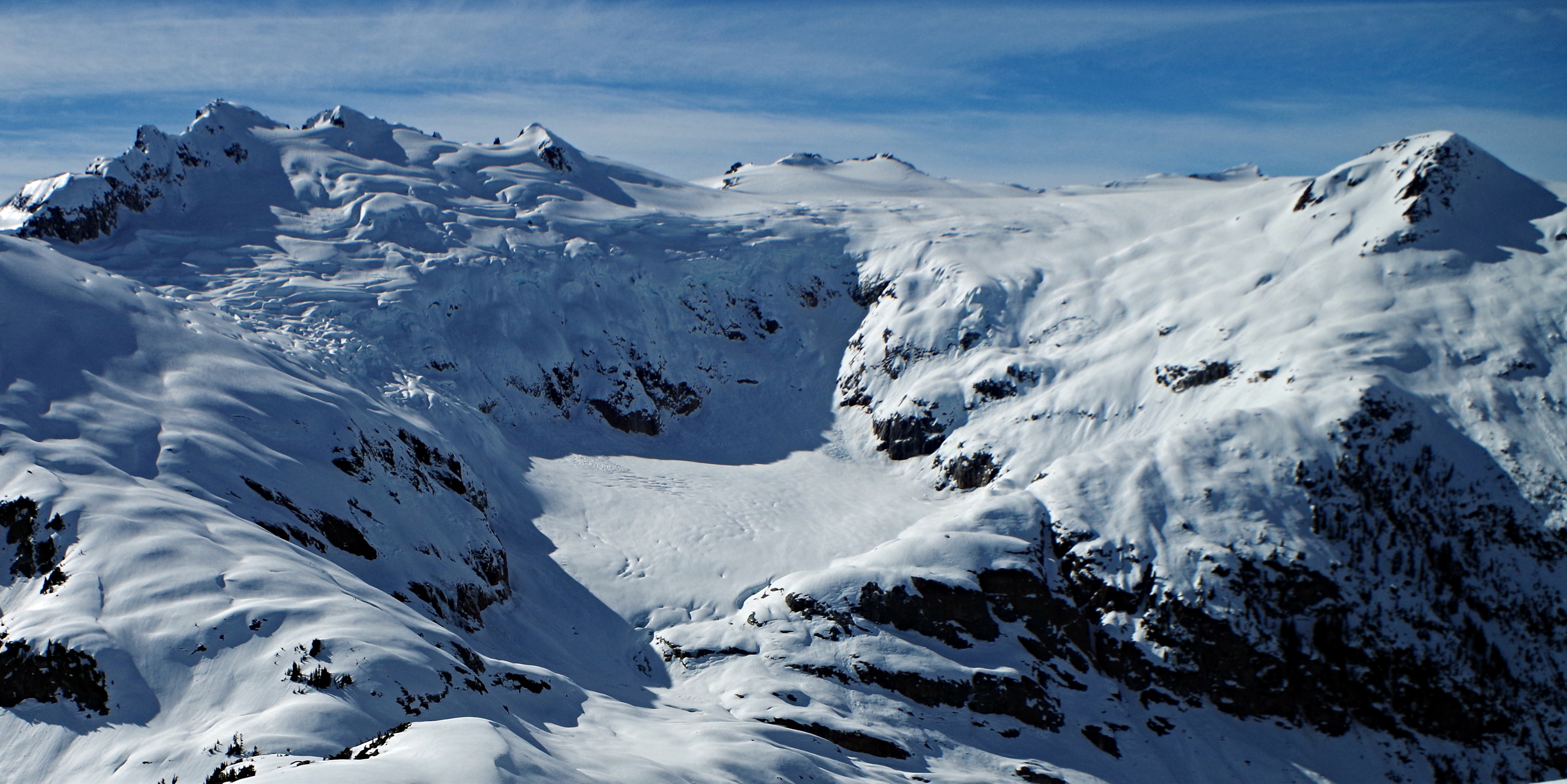
- Mount Jimmy Jimmy, eastern aspect

Highest point
- Elevation: 2,208 m (7,244 ft)
- Prominence: 1,018 m (3,340 ft)
- Parent peak: Ossa Mountain (2261 m)
- Listing: Mountains of British Columbia
- Coordinates: 49°54′35″N 123°29′13″W

Geography
- Location within British Columbia Location within Canada
- Interactive map of Mount Jimmy Jimmy
- Country: Canada
- Province: British Columbia
- District: New Westminster Land District
- Parent range: Coast Mountains
- Topo map: NTS 92G14 Cheakamus River

Climbing
- First ascent: 1952 Survey Party
- Easiest route: Scrambling, Glacier travel

Mount Jimmy Jimmy is a 2,208-metre (7,244 ft) glaciated mountain located in the Coast Mountains in southwestern British Columbia, Canada. It is situated 32 kilometres (20 mi) northwest of Squamish, and 10 km (6 mi) northwest of Ossa Mountain, which is its nearest higher peak. Mt. Jimmy Jimmy is the highest point of the Tzoonie-Clowhom Divide. Precipitation runoff from the peak and meltwater from its immense glaciers drains into tributaries of the Squamish River and Clowhom River. The mountain was named for Chief Jimmy Jimmy (native name Swahsh), a leader of the Squamish Nation, who had traplines in the vicinity of the mountain and was a skilled paddler. The mountain's name was officially adopted on June 6, 1957, by the Geographical Names Board of Canada.

== Climate ==
Based on the Köppen climate classification, Mount Jimmy Jimmy is located in the marine west coast climate zone of western North America. Most weather fronts originate in the Pacific Ocean, and travel east toward the Coast Mountains where they are forced upward by the range (Orographic lift), causing them to drop their moisture in the form of rain or snowfall. As a result, the Coast Mountains experience high precipitation, especially during the winter months in the form of snowfall. Temperatures can drop below −20 °C with wind chill factors below −30 °C. July through September offer the best months to catch favorable weather for climbing Mount Jimmy Jimmy.

== See also ==
- Geography of British Columbia
- Geology of British Columbia
