= Yellow-cedar decline =

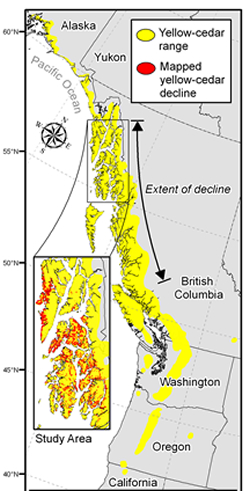
Yellow-cedar range and decline map

Yellow-cedar decline is the accelerated decline and mortality of yellow cedar (Chamaecyparis nootkatensis) occurring in the Pacific Northwest Temperate Rainforest of Southeast Alaska and British Columbia in North America. This phenomenon has been observed on over 200,000 hectares of forest and is believed to be due to reduced winter snowpacks and increased soil freezing.

== Setting ==
Yellow cedar ranges from the Klamath Mountains of California to Prince William Sound in Alaska. Limited to higher elevations throughout most of its natural range The climate in Southeast Alaska and western British Columbia is hyper-maritime, with frequent low-intensity precipitation. Snow levels in this area are highly variable due to near freezing temperatures in the winter time. Forests here are dominated by Sitka spruce (Picea stichensis), western hemlock (Tsuga heterophylla), mountain hemlock (Tsuga mertensiana), shore pine (Pinus contorta), western redcedar (Thuja plicata), and yellow cedar. Decline of this species has affected over 200,000 hectares of forest in Alaska and 50,000 hectares in British Columbia, approximately 8% of the species range

== Causes ==
It is currently generally accepted that increased regional temperature and associated reduction in snow-pack depth and duration are some of the drivers behind yellow-cedar decline. However, other causes of decline are being investigated by researchers. Current evidence suggests that yellow-cedar decline is not biologically driven or caused by direct anthropogenic pollution or atmospheric pollution. Researchers have investigated the effects of soil saturation and soil chemistry on yellow-cedar decline and have yet to reveal any conclusive data, other than the fact that these parameters may indirectly influence cedar mortality. Elevation also seems to play a role in cedar decline, as it was found in one study that yellow cedar trees growing above 130 meters (430 ft) were more cold hardy than those growing below 130 meters.

=== Freezing injury ===
Yellow-cedar decline began in about 1880 which coincides with a warming of the climate after the Little Ice Age. The mechanics of this process are still hypothetical, but evidence suggests that soil exposure to cold temperatures due to lack of canopy cover or wetness of soils can lead to freezing injury of yellow cedar. Open canopy conditions in the forest expose soils to freezing temperatures. As regional temperatures warm, precipitation falls as rain more often than snow in the winter. Snow packs in the winter offer some insulation to root systems from freezing, the absence of this snow pack allows for soil freezing. As soils freeze, root tissues, especially those in wet soils, suffer damage and can lead to tree mortality. Yellow cedar is found to be significantly less cold hardy than tree species surrounding it, such as the western hemlock, which was found to deharden at almost 13 °C less than the yellow cedar in comparable conditions.

== Management and conservation ==
Management and conservation of yellow cedar in light of its declining state could be divided into three management areas: the maladapted, the persistent, and migration. Maladapted being those areas in which yellow cedar will lose in competition with resident and exotic species. Persistent being those ecosystems in which yellow cedar has managed to compete with resident species that will require special attention for maintenance. And migration being those areas which are suitable, but do not presently contain yellow-cedar populations.

=== Maladapted ===
Conservation and restoration in areas that are maladapted for yellow cedar are futile. Areas that have already been maladapted for yellow cedar are important as sources of economic value. Dead regions of yellow cedar are still available for harvest even 80 years after death. Harvest of these areas represent a large opportunity for wood resources, shifting from logging of healthy yellow cedar in suitable habitat to those in maladapted regions could be beneficial to the conservation of this species. It seems that, following the decay of yellow cedar, western red cedar will succeed the dead forest. The red cedar offers many of the very same economic and ecological values as yellow cedar. Areas of lower elevation in Southeast Alaska and British Columbia that have seen yellow-cedar decay have been succeeded by red cedar. However, more research will need to take place as this problem persists to evaluate the economic and ecological value of subsidizing red cedar in these areas.

=== Persistent ===
Areas that are predicted with future climate change models to be suitable for sustained yellow-cedar habitation could be considered persistent from a management standpoint. It is important to accurately model these areas in order to develop effective management strategies. At a landscape level, areas with well-drained soils are most likely to host yellow cedar into the future. These are the areas that see the highest rates of production among trees in the Pacific Northwest temperate rainforest, and are thusly the areas that are targeted for timber harvest. For this reason, these areas are hotspots for active management of yellow cedar into the future, as they represent the main areas that are able to achieve conservation goals.

=== Migration ===
Some conservationists propose that assisted migration into areas uninhabited by yellow cedar will be an effective management strategy. Assisted migration is the introduction of species and genotypes into areas that are projected to be suitable for those species/genotypes. This can be controversial, mainly because it is seen as introducing invasive species into ecosystems, which could bring undesirable results. Researchers have attempted the introduction of yellow cedar in areas that it does not grow, but are within its range. A trial planting in Yakutat, Alaska, yielded first-year survival rates of over 90%, meaning that targeted migration can be used as an effective management strategy.
