= Caren Range =

Mountain range in British Columbia, Canada

- Location within British Columbia

Dimensions
- Area: 169 km^{2} (65 mi^{2})

Geography
- Country: Canada
- Region: British Columbia
- Range coordinates: 49°38′N 123°54′W
- Parent range: Pacific Ranges

The Caren Range is a low and mostly tree-covered mountain range in the Pacific Ranges of the Coast Mountains in southwestern British Columbia, Canada. It lies along the eastern shore of the Sechelt Peninsula, southeast of Sakinaw Lake, about 74 km northwest of Vancouver. It has an area of 169 km^{2} and contains Spipiyus Provincial Park. The name of the range is a long-standing misinterpretation of Carew. It was named for Benjamin Hallowell Carew. The range is noted for its ancient trees.
