= Ossa Mountain =

Mountain in British Columbia, Canada

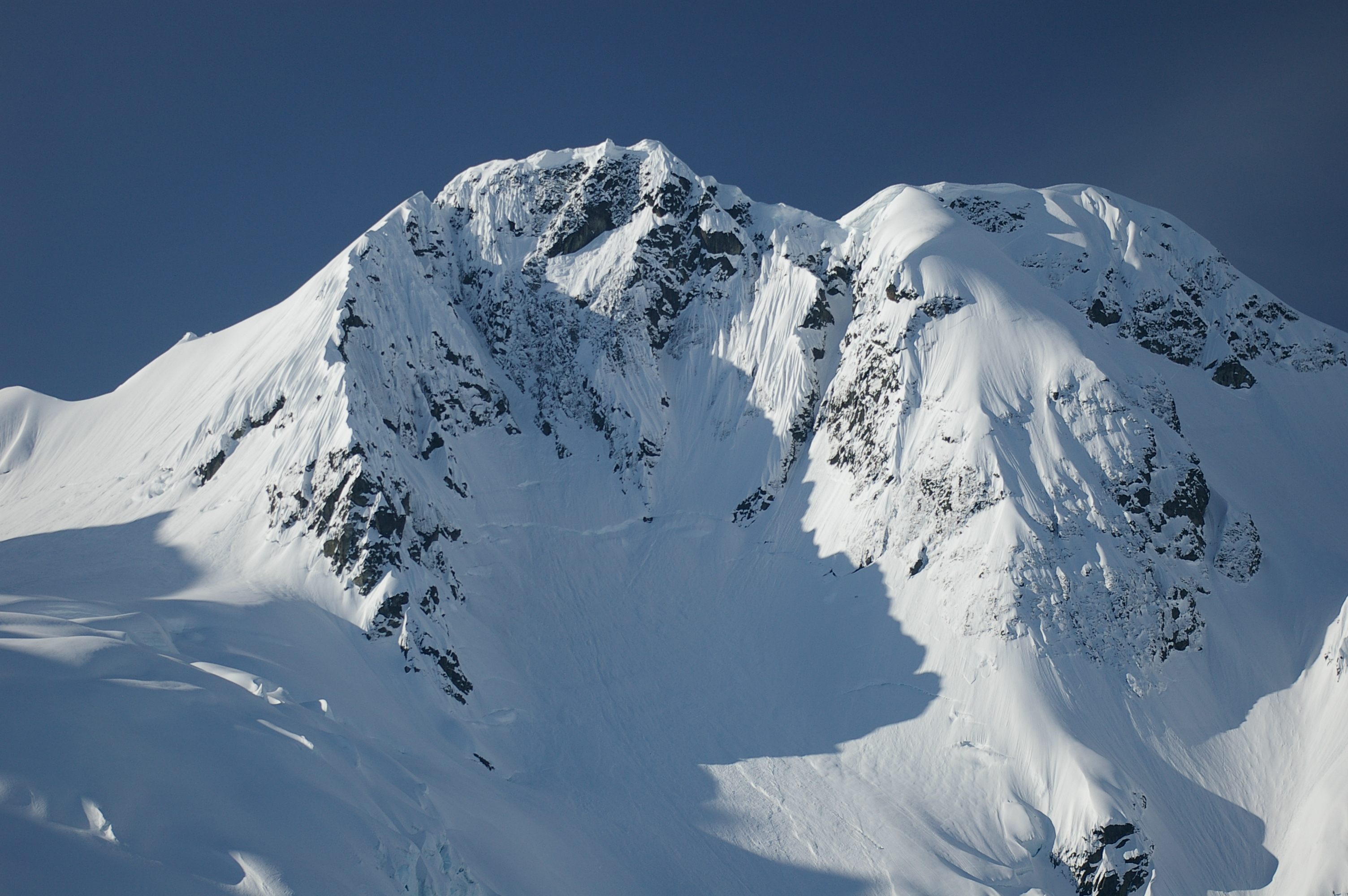
- Ossa Mountain, northeast aspect

Highest point
- Elevation: 2,261 m (7,418 ft)
- Prominence: 176 m (577 ft)
- Parent peak: Pelion Mountain (2312 m)
- Listing: Mountains of British Columbia
- Coordinates: 49°51′48″N 123°22′02″W

Geography
- Location within British Columbia Location within Canada
- Interactive map of Ossa Mountain
- Location: Tantalus Provincial Park; British Columbia, Canada
- Country: Canada
- Province: British Columbia
- District: New Westminster Land District
- Protected area: Tantalus Provincial Park
- Parent range: Tantalus Range; Coast Ranges
- Topo map: NTS 92G14 Cheakamus River

Climbing
- First ascent: 1960 by R. Chambers, J. Bryan, H. Rode
- Easiest route: Scrambling

Ossa Mountain is a 2,261-metre (7,418-foot) summit located in the Tantalus Range, in Tantalus Provincial Park, in southwestern British Columbia, Canada. It is situated 21 km (13 mi) northwest of Squamish, and 3.54 km (2 mi) north-northwest of Mount Tantalus, which is the highest peak in the Tantalus Range. Its nearest higher peak is Pelion Mountain, 0.77 km (0 mi) to the east. Unnamed glaciers lie on the northern and eastern slopes. Precipitation runoff from the peak drains into tributaries of the Squamish River and Clowhom River. The first ascent of the mountain was made on July 25, 1960, by Dick Chambers, Jack Bryan, and Howie Rode via the east ridge. The mountain names in the Tantalus Range have a Greek mythology theme, and Ossa Mountain was named for legendary Mount Ossa in Thessaly, upon which the Aloadaes are said to have attempted to pile Mount Pelion on top of Mount Ossa in their attempt to scale Olympus, home of the Greek gods. The mountain's name was officially adopted on June 6, 1957, by the Geographical Names Board of Canada.

== Climate ==
Based on the Köppen climate classification, Ossa Mountain is located in the marine west coast climate zone of western North America. Most weather fronts originate in the Pacific Ocean, and travel east toward the Coast Mountains where they are forced upward by the range (Orographic lift), causing them to drop their moisture in the form of rain or snowfall. As a result, the Coast Mountains experience high precipitation, especially during the winter months in the form of snowfall. Winter temperatures can drop below −20 °C with wind chill factors below −30 °C. The months July through September offer the most favorable weather for climbing Ossa.

== Climbing Routes ==
Established rock climbing routes on Ossa Mountain:

- East Ridge - class 4 First Ascent 1960
- West Ridge - class 4 FA 1967
- Northeast Face - FA 1968
- North Face - FA 1999
- Northwest Buttress - class 5.7 FA 2016

== Gallery ==
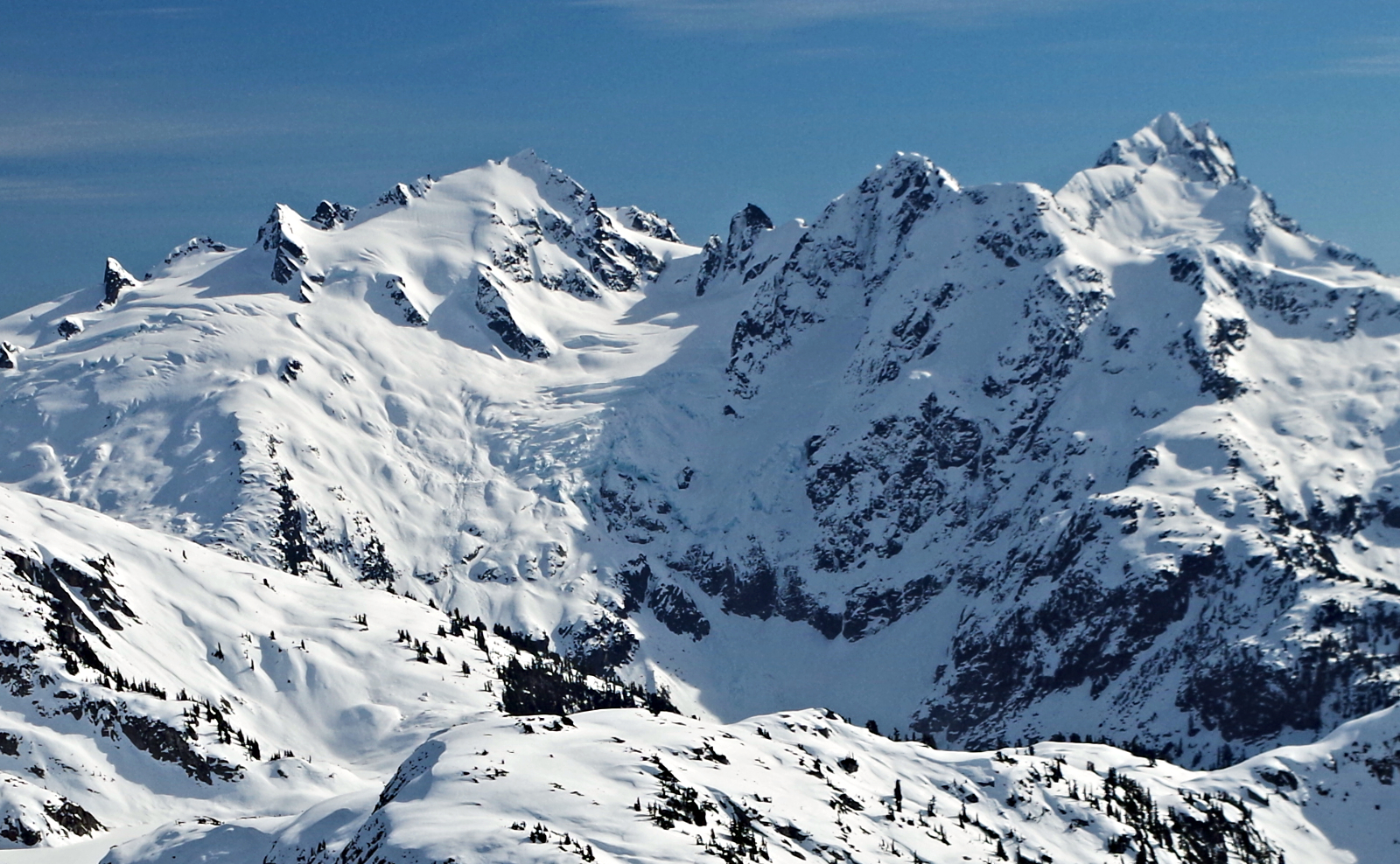
Pelion, Ossa, and Tantalus seen from the northwest on Coin Peak

== See also ==
- Geography of British Columbia
- Geology of British Columbia
