= Narrows Inlet =

Fjord in British Columbia

Coordinates: 49°42′40″N 123°46′47″W

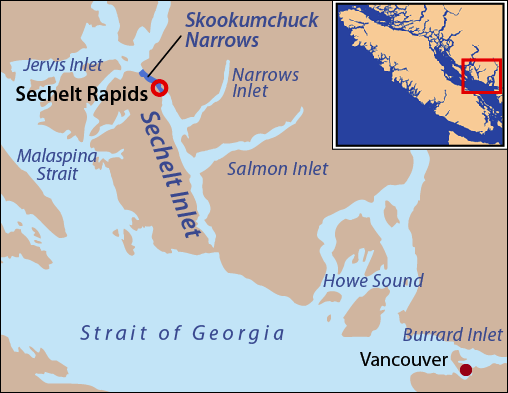
Sechelt Inlet with Narrows Inlet in centre

Narrows Inlet formerly Narrows Arm is a fjord branching east from Sechelt Inlet in British Columbia, Canada. Its companion, Salmon Inlet, another side-inlet of Sechelt Inlet, lies roughly 10 km (6.2 mi) south.

About halfway up the inlet lies the Tzoonie Narrows site of Sechelt Inlets Marine Provincial Park.
