= Clowhom River =

- Mouth of Clowhom River

Location
- Country: Canada
- Province: British Columbia
- District: New Westminster Land District

Physical characteristics
- Source: An unnamed lake
  - location: Mount Jimmy Jimmy
  - elevation: 5,732 ft (1,747 m)
- Mouth: Salmon Inlet
  - location: West of Squamish
  - elevation: 0 ft (0 m)

The Clowhom River is a short, 19.8-kilometre (12.3 mi) river in British Columbia. It flows into the head of the Salmon Inlet about 26.2 km west of Squamish.

== Course ==
The Clowhom originates at the outlet of a tiny, unnamed lake on the south slopes of Mount Jimmy Jimmy. It flows south from there for about 4.4 km until it enters remote Phantom Lake. The river turns east upon exiting Phantom Lake and very soon drops over tall Phantom Falls, which is rumored to stand at least 500 feet high. From Phantom Falls, the river runs east for about 4.4 km before turning south for about 5.7 miles and then southwest for about 5 km before entering the north end of Clowhom Lake. The river flows through a dam upon exiting the south end of Clowhom Lake. It only flows about 0.3 km from the lake outlet as it soon reaches its mouth in the Salmon Inlet.

== Clowhom Dam ==
The dam has a 21.0 meter high crest with an elevation of 55 meters above sea level, it was built in 1953 to provide 33MW of power to the pulp mill at Port Mellon near Gibsons. There is a 310 meter long penstock leading to a single turbine just above sea level, due to limited water it is considered a peaking plant. The reservoir was formerly two lakes, Upper Clowhom Lake and Lower Clowhom Lake, and is now referred to as Clowhom Lake. The location of the dam is 32 km northeast of the town of Sechelt and is operated by BC Hydro.49°42′41″N 123°32′7″W

=== Sechelt Creek Generating Station ===
Five kilometers down the BC Hydro Clowhom-Sechelt transmission line is another hydroelectric plant, completed in 1997 and owned by Regional Power Incorporated. This run-of-river project has a long penstock which drops 360 meters to two 8.3 Mw turbines on Salmon Inlet. Electricity generated is sold to BC Hydro.

== Tributaries ==
The Clowhom River has 4 major named tributaries. The first is Red Tusk Creek, which flows into the river just above Clowhom Lake, the second is Taquat Creek, which enters the lake just below its inlet, the third is Dempster Creek, which enters not far down the lake's shore from the mouth of Taquat Creek and the last one is Bear Creek, a river-sized creek that enters the lower reaches of the lake.

== See also ==
- List of rivers of British Columbia
- Sechelt Inlet
