= Sechelt Inlet =

Inlet in British Columbia, Canada

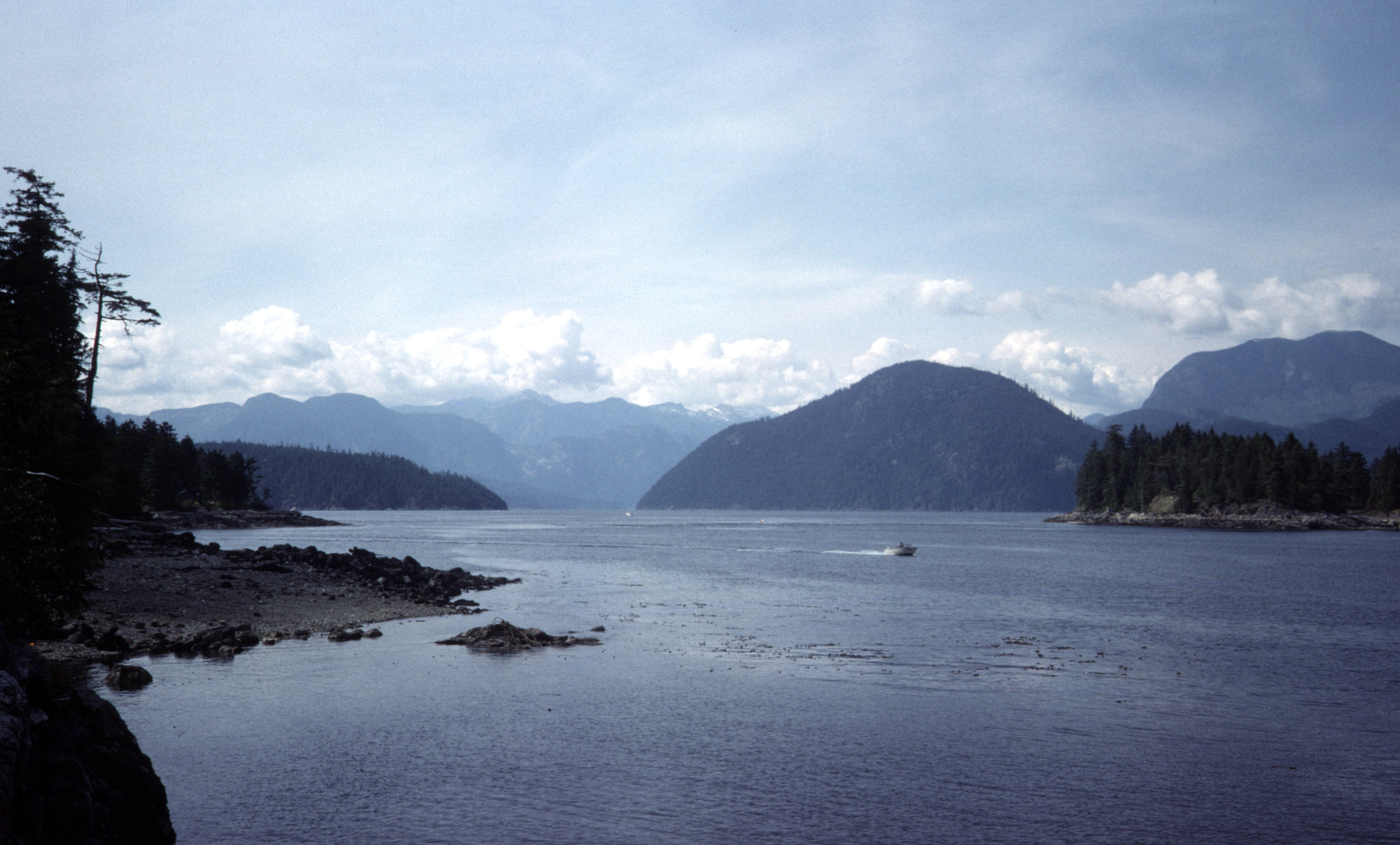

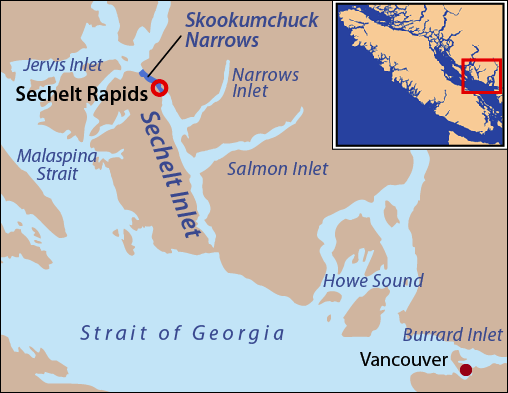

- Location within British Columbia
- Location: Sunshine Coast, British Columbia
- Coordinates: 49°37′46″N 123°45′46″W
- Type: Fjord
- Etymology: Named for the Shishalh people
- Part of: Salish Sea
- Primary inflows: Salmon Inlet, Narrows Inlet
- Primary outflows: Jervis Inlet

Sechelt Inlet formerly Seechelt Inlet is one of the principal inlets of the British Columbia Coast. The inlet is significant in that it almost makes an island of what is instead the Sechelt Peninsula, whose isthmus is at the town of Sechelt at the head of the inlet. The isthmus is less than 1.2 km (0.75 mi) in length. Sechelt Inlet's mouth is at Jervis Inlet, inland from the Malaspina Strait.

Also significant about Sechelt Inlet are, near the inlet's mouth, the Sechelt Rapids within the Skookumchuck Narrows, which rage with near waterfall-like fury during tidal flow, both incoming and outgoing. Other fjords on the British Columbia Coast have similar rapids, also called skookumchucks (strong waters in the Chinook Jargon, the old coastal trade language), which like Sechelt Inlet are caused by the typical shallows and narrows near the mouth of a fjord as the volume of water inside the fjord's depths tries to pour out to, or in from, the more open waters beyond. In Sechelt Inlet's case, the Skookumchuck Narrows are exactly as its name describes - narrow - forcing the water to an even greater torrent than is typical elsewhere.

Sechelt Inlet has two side-inlets, Salmon Inlet, which ends at a small power dam at the mouth of the Clowhom River and is about 23 km (14 mi) in length, and Narrows Inlet, which ends at the mouth of the Tzoonie River and includes the Tzoonie Narrows. The latter is about 15 km (9.3 mi) in length and emerges on the main inlet just inside the inner mouth of the Skookumchuck Narrows.

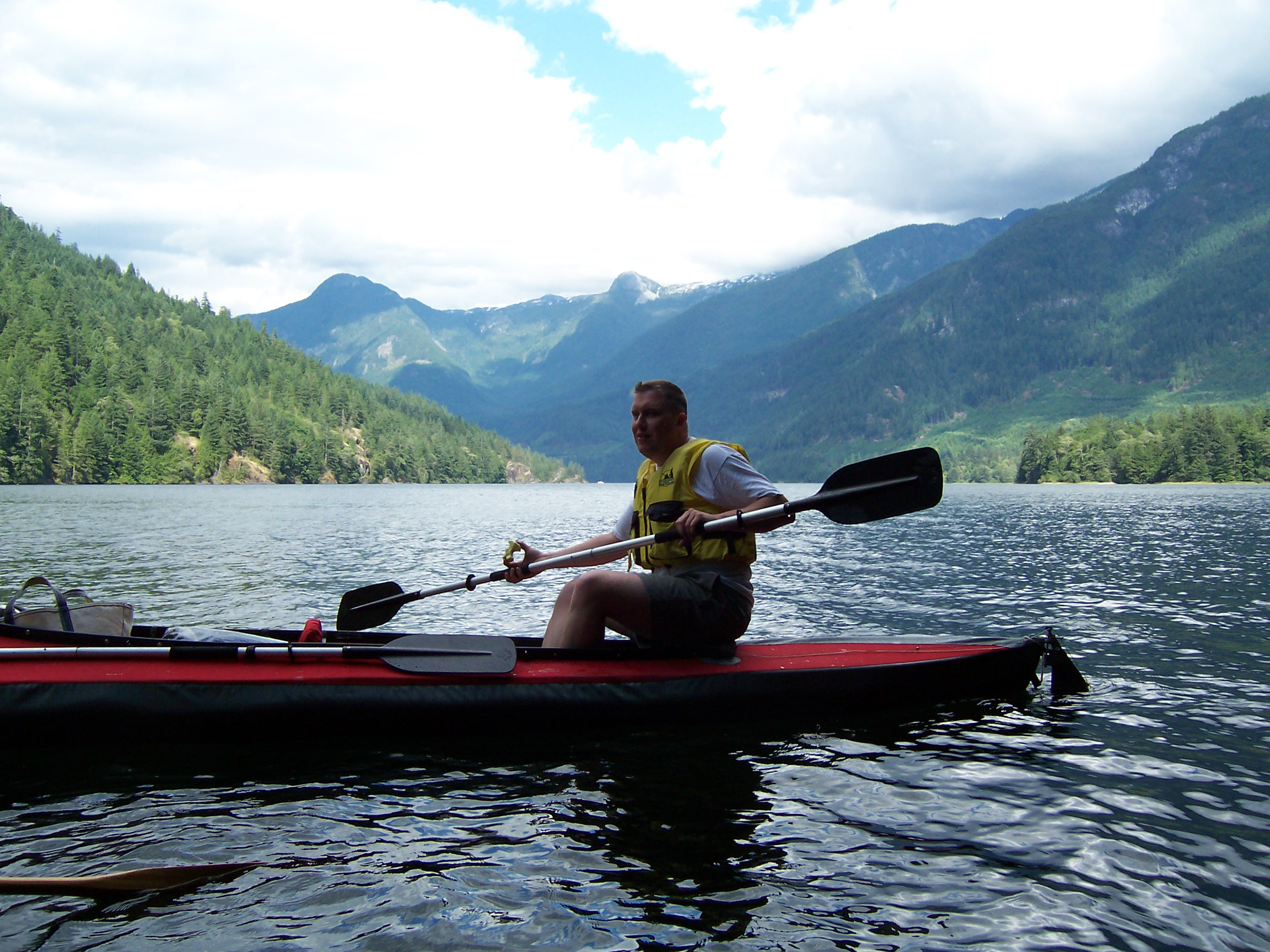
Kayaking through Tzoonie Narrows

From early April to late September 2007, the inlet was a habitat for over 200 Pacific white-sided dolphin. These social mammals seemed to enjoy seeking the attention of their human observers.

== See also ==
- List of fjords in Canada
- Mount Richardson Provincial Park
- Porpoise Bay Provincial Park
- Lighthouse Pub
