= Sechelt (disambiguation) =

Sechelt is a district municipality in British Columbia, Canada.

Sechelt could also refer to:

- Sechelt (steamboat), also known as Hattie Hanson
- Shishalh, a First Nations group in the region, also known as the Sechelt
- Sechelt language, the language spoken by the Shishalh
- Sechelt Aerodrome
- Sechelt Inlet, an inlet
- Sechelt Peninsula, a peninsula created by the inlet
- Sechelt Indian Band
- Sechelt Indian Government District, a municipality
