= North Thormanby Island =

Island in British Columbia, Canada

Coordinates: 49°30′10″N 124°00′10″W

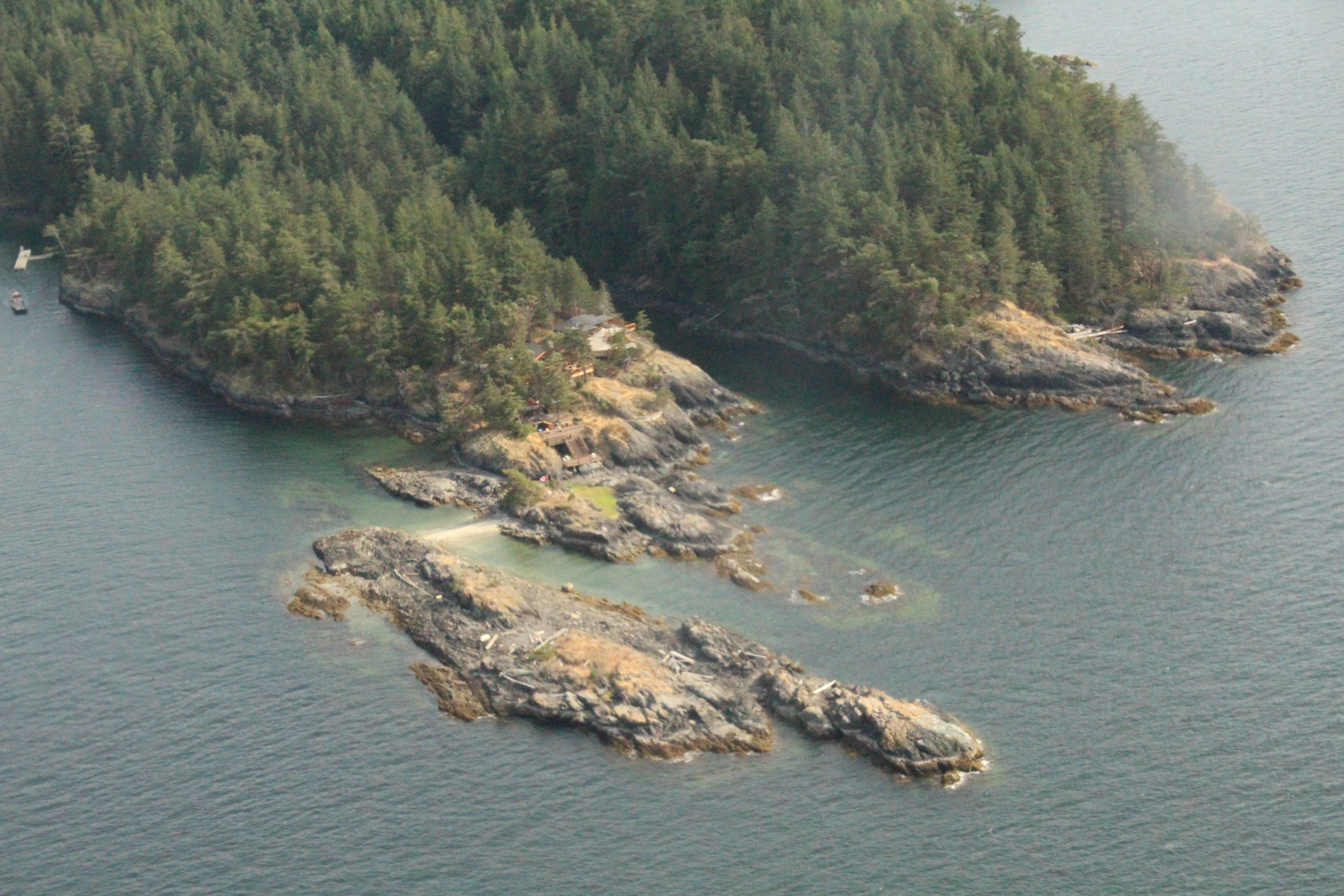
Northern tip of South Thormanby Island, seen from a floatplane

North Thormanby Island (sxwelap in she shashishalhem) is an island off of the Sunshine Coast of British Columbia, Canada, located 17 km west of Sechelt, and within the shared territories of the Tla'amin Nation and the shíshálh Nation.

The island is noted for its sandy beaches and is a popular anchorage for small boats cruising the Salish Sea.

The community of Vaucroft, located on the island, may be accessed via private water taxi services from nearby Halfmoon Bay, British Columbia.

== Geography ==
North Thormanby Island forms part of the Gulf Islands. At low tide, the island is connected to its neighbouring island, South Thormanby Island, by a sand bridge. It is possible to walk on the beach all around the island at low tide without trespassing, as the foreshore or intertidal zone is not private property in British Columbia.

Some landmarks in the area include:

- Buccaneer Bay Provincial Park (North Thormanby Island)
- Simson Provincial Park (South Thormanby Island)
- Water Bay (South Thormanby Island)
- Smuggler Cove Marine Provincial Park (Halfmoon Bay, on the mainland)
- Frenchman's Cove (Halfmoon Bay, on the mainland)

== Ecology ==
The coastal sand ecosystem found on the Thormanby Islands is a unique and rare ecosystem that supports a number of provincially Red-listed (endangered or threatened) Ecological Communities (BC Conservation Data Centre). Both water birds and migratory songbirds heavily depend on this habitat for seasonal and year-round nesting, foraging, and refuge during storms and weather events.

There are two coastal sand ecosystem sites on the Thormanby Islands. On the south island, Gill Beach in Buccaneer Bay has a large sand plain and salt marsh. Buccaneer Bay stretches from Gill Beach north to Buccaneer Bay Provincial Park. Coastal sand ecosystems are found all along this stretch of Buccaneer Bay. On the northeastern side of North Thormanby Island is Vaucroft Beach. This area is on a crescent-shaped sand deposit with a main access dock in the middle. To the south of the dock is the current access point for unloading barges with vehicles. The coastal sand ecosystem area of interest is primarily to the south of the dock.

The interior of the island is heavily forested, with predominantly second-growth Douglas-fir and Western red cedar. Other common tree species include Western hemlock, red alder, arbutus, lodgepole pine, and bigleaf maple. Many edible berries grow in the forest understory, including salal, salmonberry, thimbleberry, red huckleberry, and blackberries (both the native trailing blackberry, and invasive Himalayan blackberry). In marshy areas of the island, bulrushes and swamp grasses may be found.

An estimated population of approximately 300 Columbian black-tailed deer inhabits the islands. Other small animals include mink, raccoons, squirrels, chipmunks, and birds of all sorts. There have also been beavers inhabiting the lake and, in recent memory, black bear and cougar have been sighted on the island, though they are not believed to be presently established. The area is well known for its fishing, especially salmon fishing.

== History ==
South and North Thormanby Islands (together known as sxwelap in she shashishalhem) are located within the shared territories of the Tla'amin Nation and the shíshálh Nation. There are at least five known archaeological shell middens on South Thormanby Island.

Spanish naval officer José María Narváez was the first European to visit the island on July 12, 1791. He named the island "Isla de San Ignacio".

The name "Thormanby" was later given to the islands in 1860 by Captain George Henry Richards. The name commemorates the racehorse who won the Epsom Derby that year. Several other place names on the island also commemorate Richards' interest in horse racing. For example, the name Buccaneer Bay honours another race horse who won the Royal Hunt Cup at Ascot in 1861.

The island was uninhabited and forested until 1905, when John William (Jack) Vaughan built the first cabin and a wharf on the island. At the time of World War One, Vaughan sold the north east corner of the island to the BC Telephone Company, which developed a small resort there with rowboats, boat houses, a lodge, a telephone and cabin there. Upon returning from the first world war in 1919, Vaughan bought back the development from BC Tel, opening it to the public as a resort in 1923, while the Union Steamship Company daily service to North Thormanby Island.

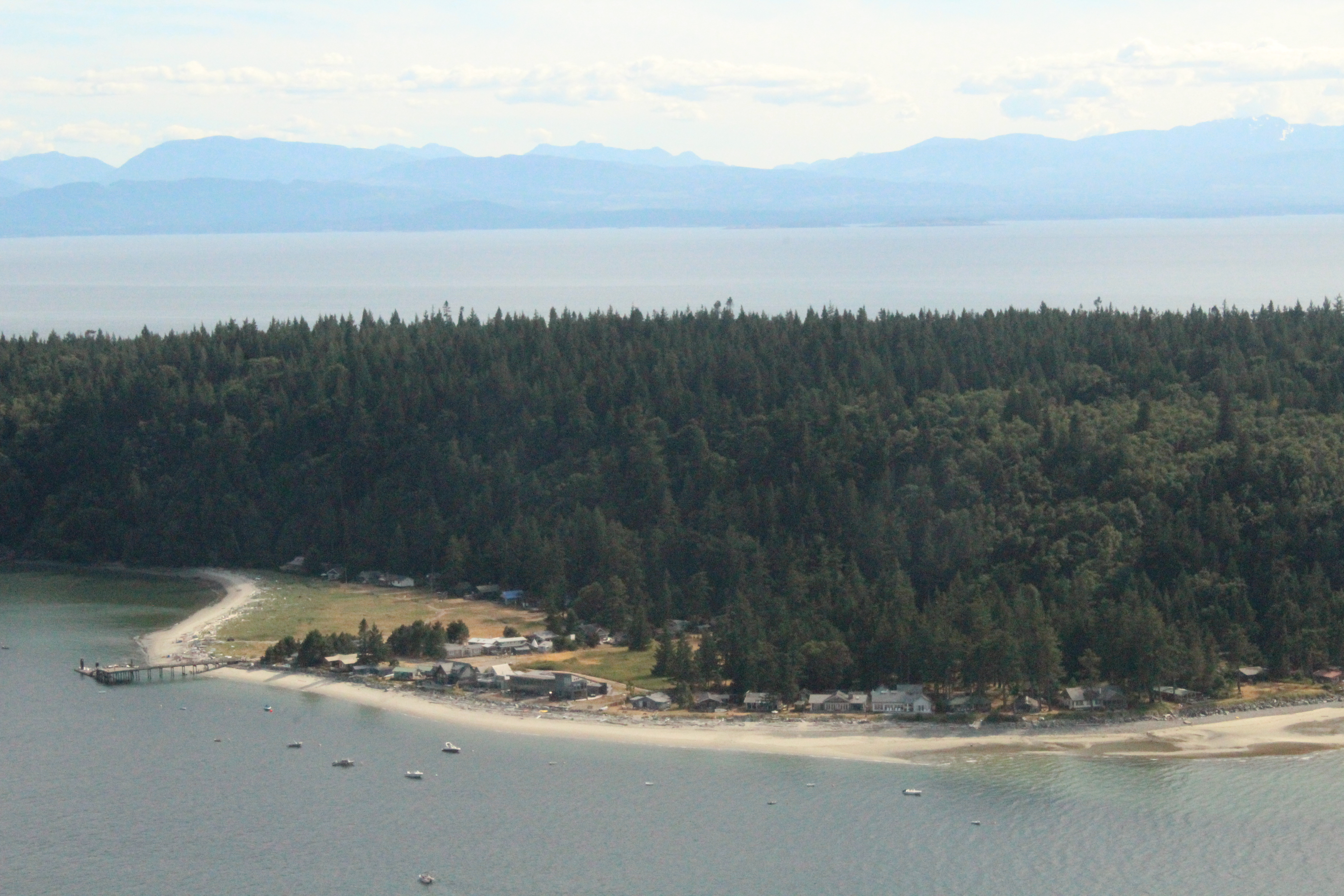
Vaucroft Beach

During the 1930s, a small recreational community of cottages was built along Vaucroft beach on the Buccaneer Bay side of the island. The Union Steamship Company halted its service to the Thormanby Islands in 1946, after which logging operations of the old growth trees on the top of the island were carried out.

Starting in the late 1960s, the island gradually was subdivided into recreational properties. The present wharf on North Thormanby island is known as the Vaucroft port facility. This wharf has been administered by the Sunshine Coast Regional District since 2001.

On the southern tip of the island is the Buccaneer Bay Provincial Park. On the northern tip of the island is the small community of Vaucroft Beach. The island is connected to South Thormanby Island by a sand bridge at low tide.
