= Simson Marine Provincial Park =

Provincial park in British Columbia, Canada

- IUCN category II (national park)
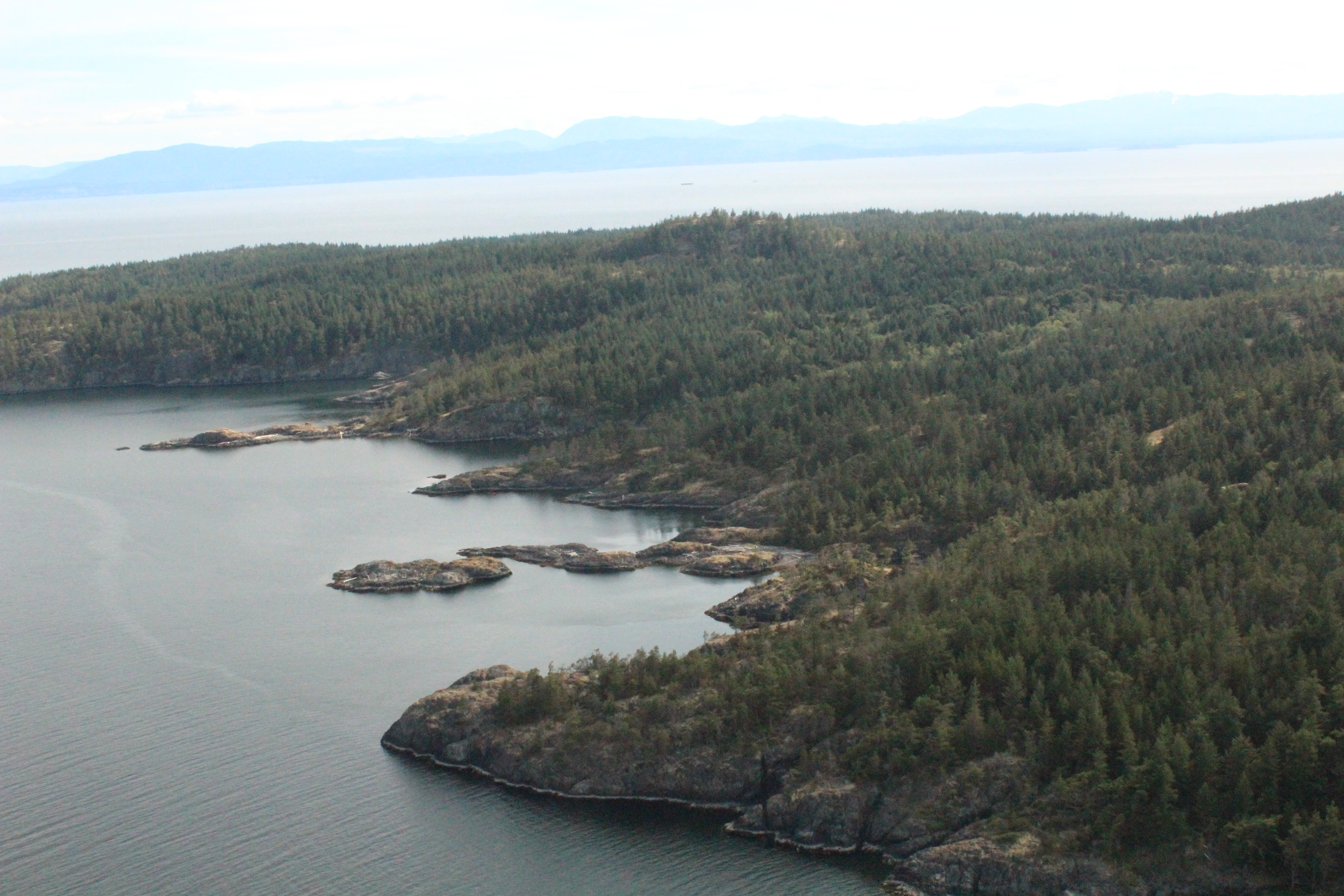
- Panoramic view

- Location within British Columbia
- Interactive map of Simson Marine Provincial Park
- Location: British Columbia, Canada
- Nearest city: Sechelt
- Coordinates: 49°29′14″N 123°57′55″W
- Area: 4.61 km^{2} (1.78 sq mi)
- Established: March 19, 1986
- Governing body: BC Parks

Simson Provincial Park is a provincial park in British Columbia, Canada.

The Simson Provincial Park is located on the southern half of South Thormanby Island and is opposite Halfmoon Bay, British Columbia. The park is 461 acres (1.87 km^{2}) of mostly forested land, though it also contains the remains of an abandoned farm and orchard. The park is only accessible by sea. It takes its name from pioneer Calvert Simson whose family donated the land in order to create the park.
