= Islands Trust =

Federation of local governments on islands in British Columbia

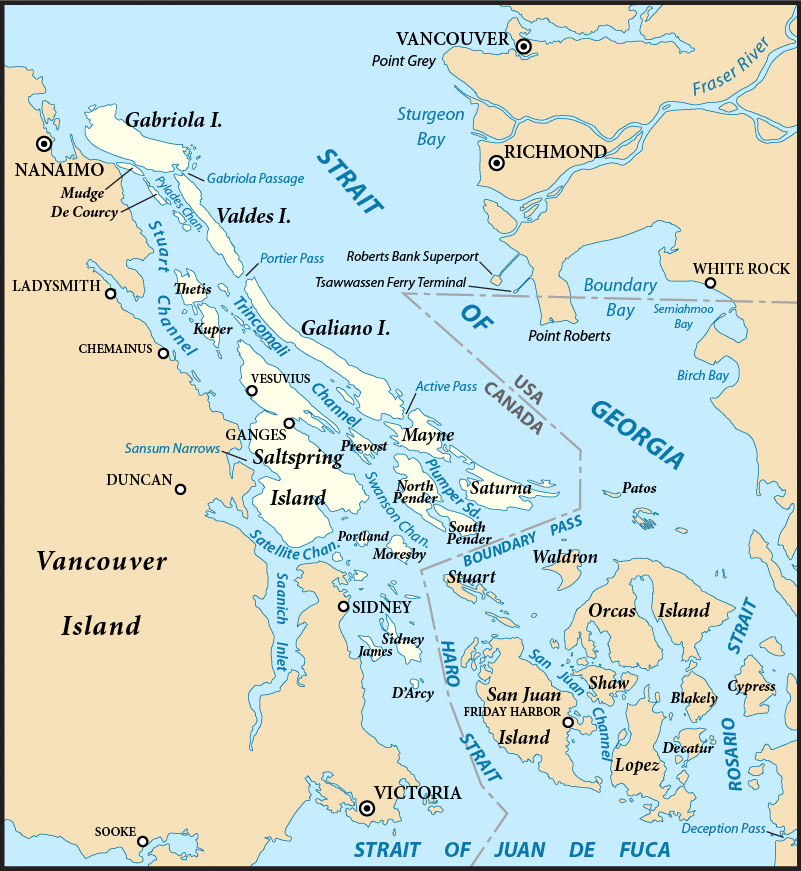
The Southern Gulf Islands of the Strait of Georgia are under the jurisdiction of the Islands Trust. Other Islands in the Northern Strait of Georgia and Howe Sound are also part of Islands Trust.

The Islands Trust is a federation of local governments on the islands in the Strait of Georgia, Howe Sound and Haro Strait in British Columbia. It was established by, and is operated under, the Islands Trust Act, enacted by the Government of British Columbia in 1974. The goal of the Islands Trust is to "preserve and protect the Trust Area and its unique amenities and environment for the benefit of the residents of the Trust Area and of British Columbia". The conservation arm, Islands Trust Conservancy, works to preserve and protect landscapes across the Trust Area. Through conservation covenants and nature reserves, the Conservancy protects over 110 properties totaling 1,375 hectares.

The Islands Trust is subdivided into various local trust areas, each responsible for land use planning and regulation for respective islands and nearby minor islands. The municipality of Bowen Island is also within the jurisdiction of the Islands Trust. Gambier Island Local Trust Committee does land use planning as well for Keats Island and for North Thormanby Island and South Thormanby Island.

== Local Trust Areas ==
Local Trust Area	Island	Population	Total
Ballenas-Winchelsea		?	?
Bowen	Bowen	4256	4256
Denman	Denman	1391	1391
Gabriola	Gabriola	4500	4640
Gabriola	Mudge	140	4640
Galiano	Galiano	1396	1408
Galiano	Parker	12	1408
Gambier	Gambier	430	476
Gambier	Anvil	6	476
Gambier	Keats	40	476
Gambier	North Thormanby	?	476
Gambier	South Thormanby	?	476
Hornby	Hornby	1225	1225
Lasqueti	Lasqueti	498	498
Lasqueti	Jedediah	0	498
Mayne	Mayne	1310	1310
North Pender	North Pender	2470	2476
North Pender	James	~4	2476
North Pender	Moresby	2	2476
Salt Spring	Salt Spring	11,635	11,674
Salt Spring	Piers	39	11,674
Salt Spring	Prevost	?	11,674
Saturna	Saturna	465	465
Saturna	Samuel	?	465
South Pender	South Pender	306	306
Thetis	Thetis	379	691
Thetis	Penelakut	302	691
Thetis	Valdes	10	691
Total			30,816+
