= St. Augustine's Indian Residential School =

School in Sechelt, British Columbia, Canada

Coordinates: 49.474°N 123.751°W

St. Augustine's Indian Residential School was a school in Sechelt, British Columbia, Canada, from 1904 to 1975, which was part of the Canadian Indian residential school system. Former pupils include actor Pat John who played in The Beachcombers for 19 years. The school was within 0.25 miles (0.40 km) of the commercial centre of Sechelt, and was also known as Sechelt Residential School, Sechelt Industrial School and Our Lady of Lourdes.

== History ==
In 1899, the shíshálh Nation requested a school for their children and were refused; again in 1901 and 1903, the government had said that no action could be taken on a school. In 1903, Nation Members began to build a schoolhouse with room for 50 boys and girls with the support of the Roman Catholic Bishop of New Westminster and Oblate missionaries. The school opened on July 28, 1904, under the administration of the Roman Catholic Church. In 1905, it became funded by the Government of Canada.

The school was managed by the Sisters of the lnstruction of the Child Jesus from 1904 to 1924, and members of that order held posts in the school until 1975. From 1924 to 1969, the Missionary Oblates of Mary Immaculate managed the school, and members of that order were also posted there until 1975. The government took over the employment of teachers in 1954 and the management of the school in 1969.

There were 46 students enrolled in 1905, rising to 80 in 1922 and peaking at 153 in 1956; in 1975 there were 85 students enrolled.

The school building burned down on May 29, 1917; the school reopened in December 1918 and a new building was formally opened on June 15, 1922. In August 1923, the Nation sent a petition complaining of "poor education", "poor food" and "over-punishment", and the majority of the students did not return for the next term. In response a new, male, principal was appointed and the grant to the school was increased.

The school closed on June 30, 1975.

=== Student deaths ===
The National Centre for Truth and Reconciliation acknowledged the deaths of five students who attended the school. In 2021, in the light of discussion of Canadian Indian residential school gravesites and in particular deaths at Kamloops Indian Residential School, Chief Warren Paull of the shíshálh Nation said "As far as deaths go, I know that's not even close to the approximate number. They just weren't recorded," and Chief Darren Blaney of the Homalco First Nation said in 2021, "There's a whole generation of Homalco people (who) didn't come home from that residential school ... They're buried somewhere in Sechelt." An investigation of the school site using ground penetrating radar began in February 2022.

== Later use of site ==
The last remains of the school building were burned in 2008. The site is now occupied by the administrative and cultural centre of the shíshálh Nation, including the tems swiya Museum and the Raven's Cry Theatre.

== Notable former students ==
- Pat John (1953-2022), actor in long-running television series The Beachcombers
