= Buccaneer Bay Provincial Park =

Park in Canada

- IUCN category II (national park)
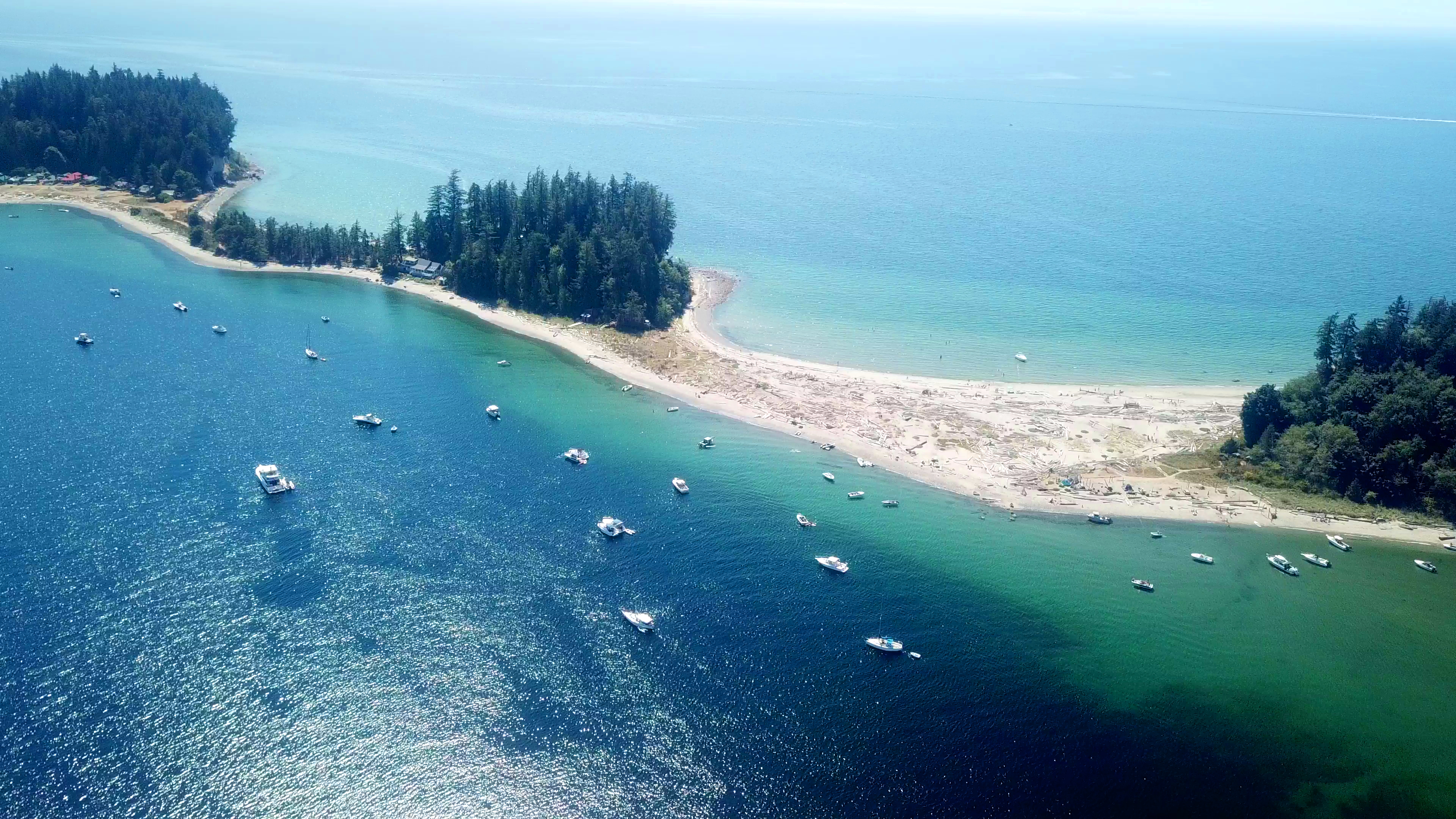
- Photograph of Buccaneer Bay taken from a drone

- Location within British Columbia
- Interactive map of Buccaneer Bay Provincial Park
- Location: New Westminster Land District, British Columbia, Canada
- Nearest city: Sechelt, BC
- Coordinates: 49°29′41″N 123°59′27″W
- Area: 45 ha (110 acres)
- Established: August 10, 1989
- Governing body: BC Parks

Buccaneer Bay Provincial Park is a provincial park in British Columbia, Canada. It is located 17 km west of Sechelt on North Thormanby Island, offshore from the community of Halfmoon Bay.
