= South Thormanby Island =

Island in British Columbia, Canada

Coordinates: 49°29′10″N 123°58′10″W

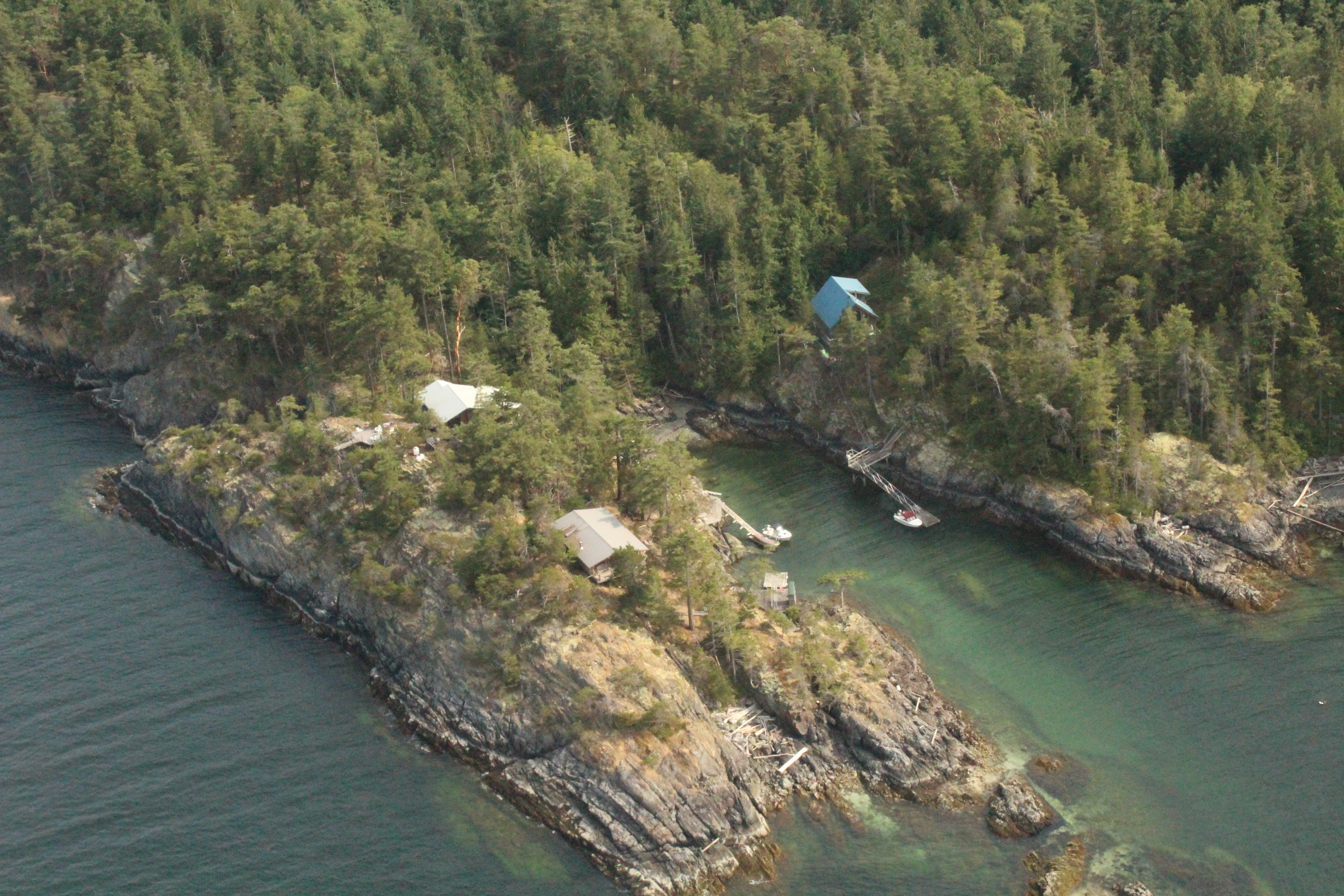
South Thormanby Island, seen from a floatplane

South Thormanby Island (sx̱welap in she shashishalhem) is an island off the Sunshine Coast of British Columbia, Canada, located 17 km west of Sechelt, and within the shared territories of the Tla'amin Nation and the shíshálh Nation.

Simson Provincial Park, established in 1986 and named after pioneer Calvert Simson, occupies the majority of the southern part of South Thormanby Island. The northern half of the island is predominately private property, with a concentration of seasonal cottages along Buccaneer Bay and Water Bay.

== Geography ==
South Thormanby Island forms part of the Gulf Islands, and is separated from the mainland of the Sunshine Coast by Welcome Passage. At low tide, the island is connected to its neighbour, North Thormanby Island, by a sand bridge.

There are two main hills on the island: Mount Seafield in the south and Spy Glass Hill in the north. South of Mount Seafield, there is a large lake in an area known locally as "The Farm". The south island is much rockier than its northern neighbour. Tattenham Ledge, a long shallow underwater shelf of rock, extends from the northern side of the island and is a hazard to navigation.

There are several small islands attached to South Thormanby island including Pirate Rock and Merry Island (nepshilin in she shashishalhem) to the south.

== Ecology ==
The Thormanby Islands are located within the Coastal Douglas-fir (CDF) biogeoclimatic zone, the smallest and most at-risk of British Columbia's 16 biogeoclimatic zones. The CDF contains more species at risk than any other biogeoclimatic zone in BC, including 24 globally imperiled species and 282 species that are provincially-listed species at risk, as well as 44 ecological communities at risk. For example, the provincially red-listed Douglas-fir/dull Oregon grape ecological community is dispersed throughout both islands. The grand fir/three-leaved foamflower ecological community, also on the provincial red-list, is found in parts of the north island.

A rare coastal sand ecosystem that supports two additional red-listed ecological communities is found along some beaches, including Buccaneer Bay and Vaucroft Beach. These communities are the large-headed sedge ecological community and dune wildrye/beach pea ecological community. Additionally, a unique sand plain and salt marsh is found on the south island at Gill Beach. Both water birds and migratory songbirds heavily depend on these habitats for seasonal and year-round nesting, foraging, and refuge during storms and weather events.

The interior of the island is heavily forested, with predominantly second-growth Douglas-fir and Western red cedar. Other common tree species include Western hemlock, red alder, arbutus, lodgepole pine, and bigleaf maple. Many edible berries grow in the forest understory, including salal, salmonberry, thimbleberry, red huckleberry, and blackberries (both the native trailing blackberry, and invasive Himalayan blackberry). In marshy areas of the island, bulrushes and swamp grasses may be found.

An estimated population of approximately 300 Columbian black-tailed deer inhabits the islands. Other small animals include mink, raccoons, squirrels, chipmunks, and birds of all sorts. There have also been beavers inhabiting the lake and, in recent memory, black bear and cougar have been sighted on the island, though they are not believed to be presently established. The area is well known for its fishing, especially salmon fishing.

== History ==
South and North Thormanby Islands (together known as sx̱welap in she shashishalhem) are located within the shared territories of the Tla'amin Nation and the shíshálh Nation. The village of klayahkwohss, in what is today known as Buccaneer Bay, served as a primary location for winter dances and ceremonies along with the nearby village of sex̱wʔamin (Garden Bay) to the north. There are at least five known archaeological shell middens on South Thormanby Island.

Spanish naval officer José María Narváez was the first European to visit the islands, which he named "Isla de San Ignacio," on July 12, 1791.

The name "Thormanby" was later given to the islands in 1860 by Captain George Henry Richards. This name commemorates the racehorse who won the Epsom Derby that year. Several other place names on the island also commemorate Richards' interest in horse racing. For example, the name Buccaneer Bay honours another race horse who won the Royal Hunt Cup at Ascot in 1861

In 1892, rights to the majority of land on the island was secured by Calvert Simson, a shopkeeper of the Hastings Mill Store in Gastown, through a crown grant. Around 1912, he cleared the swamp on the southern part of the island to establish a farm and orchard. The farm was later abandoned in 1948 and the original buildings were demolished in the 1960s and 1970s. Some semi-wild apple and cherry trees, remnants of the old orchard, can still be found in this area.

During the 1920s and 1930s, the Union Steamship Company constructed a float in Buccaneer Bay and made regular trips to the island from Vancouver. At this time, trails were constructed throughout the island and the various bays were named.

From 1951 until 1981, South Thormanby Island was subject to selective logging. Approximately 75% of the trees harvested were Coastal Douglas-fir and 25% were Western red cedar and balsam poplar. Most of the old trees that remain today were not harvested as they were not suitable for merchantable timber. Today, a second-growth forest has established throughout the island.

Beavers were introduced to the island in 1984 and 1985. They dammed part of the meadow at the former Simson Farm, creating the lake that currently exists there.
