= Roberts Creek Provincial Park =

Provincial park in British Columbia, Canada

- IUCN category II (national park)
- Location within British Columbia
- Interactive map of Roberts Creek Provincial Park
- Location: British Columbia, Canada
- Nearest city: Roberts Creek
- Coordinates: 49°26′31″N 123°40′22″W
- Area: 40 ha (99 acres)
- Established: November 21, 1947
- Governing body: BC Parks

Roberts Creek Provincial Park is a provincial park in British Columbia, Canada, located northwest of the community of Roberts Creek, between Gibsons and Sechelt. First created in 1947 with an area of 100 acres (0.40 km^{2}), it was modified in size in 2000 to approximately 40 ha.

== See also ==
- List of British Columbia provincial parks
