= Pat John =

First Nations actor from Canada (1953–2022)

- Born: March 1953; Vancouver, British Columbia, Canada
- Died: 13 July 2022 (age 69); Sechelt, British Columbia, Canada
- Occupation: Actor
- Years active: 1971–1990; 2002

Pat John (March 1953 – 13 July 2022) was a First Nations actor from Canada. He played Jesse for 19 years on The Beachcombers, the second-longest running series in Canadian television history.

John, a member of the shíshálh Nation, was one of the first Indigenous people to appear on television in a non-caricature role. He played Jesse Jim, business partner with Bruno Gerussi in "The Persephone" log-salvaging business on the CBC series. The show became an international hit.

John joined the series in 1972, staying until it ended in 1990. His only other film credit was in the 2002 made-for-TV movie The New Beachcombers where he appeared alongside Marianne Jones who played his wife Laurel in the original series.

He was a student at St. Augustine's Indian Residential School in Sechelt, British Columbia, part of the Canadian Indian residential school system, which involved forced removal and widespread abuse. When he left, he got work at a local sawmill. When The Beachcombers ended, he started clam and shellfish harvesting.

Pat John died at a relative's house in Sechelt on July 13, 2022, aged 69.
