= School District 46 Sunshine Coast =

School district in British Columbia, Canada

- School District 46 Sunshine Coast logo

Location
- Gibsons Gibsons, Sechelt in Metro/Coast Canada

District information
- Superintendent: Kate Kerr
- Schools: 14
- Budget: CA$64.54 million

Students and staff
- Students: 3,533

Other information
- Website: www.sd46.bc.ca

School District 46 Sunshine Coast is a school district in British Columbia, Canada. It covers an area in the Sunshine Coast region northwest of Greater Vancouver, including the communities of Gibsons, and Sechelt.

The school district has a significant number of students with First Nations, Métis, and Inuit ancestry. It operates within the traditional territories of the shíshálh Nation and the Skwxwu7mesh uxwumixw (Squamish Nation) and works with these First Nations to provide Aboriginal Programs and Services, including the sháshishálhem (shíshálh) Language and Culture Program. In partnership with the shíshálh Nation Education Department, these are offered at both elementary and secondary schools.

== Schools ==
School	Location	Grades	School number	School type	Staff	Enrollment (2024)
Cedar Grove Elementary School	Gibsons	K-7				234
Chatelech Secondary School	Sechelt	8-12	4646017	Public high school		617
Davis Bay Elementary School	Sechelt	K-5				195
Elphinstone Secondary School	Gibsons	8-12	4646008	Public high school		568
Gibsons Elementary School	Gibsons	K-7				349
Halfmoon Bay Elementary School	Halfmoon Bay	K-7				177
Kinnikinnick Elementary School	Sechelt	K-7				240
Langdale Elementary School	Gibsons	K-7				120
Madeira Park Elementary School	Madeira Park	K-6				113
Pender Harbour Elementary-Secondary School	Madeira Park	7-12				76
Roberts Creek Elementary School	Roberts Creek	K-7				305
Sechelt Elementary School	Sechelt			Closed in 2010		
Sunshine Coast Alternative School	Gibsons	8-12	4699076	Public high school	11	107
West Sechelt Elementary School	Sechelt	K-7				277
SPIDER	Online	K-12				123
Continuing Ed	n/a					32

== School board ==
The current school board was elected in October 2022 for a four-year term. However, Trustee Haines resigned from the board September 13th, 2023, prompting a by-election. Following the December 9th election, Tracey Lynn McClelland was elected to the Board for the duration of the term.

- Amanda Amaral (Board Chair)
- Sue Giraard
- Tracey Lynn McClelland
- Maria Hampvent
- Stacia Leech (Vice-chair)
- Pammila Ruth (BCPSEA Trustee Representative)
- Ann Skelcher

Former Board Member:

- Samantha Haines (resigned)

== See also ==
- List of school districts in British Columbia
