= Roberts Creek, British Columbia =

Roberts Creek
- Community
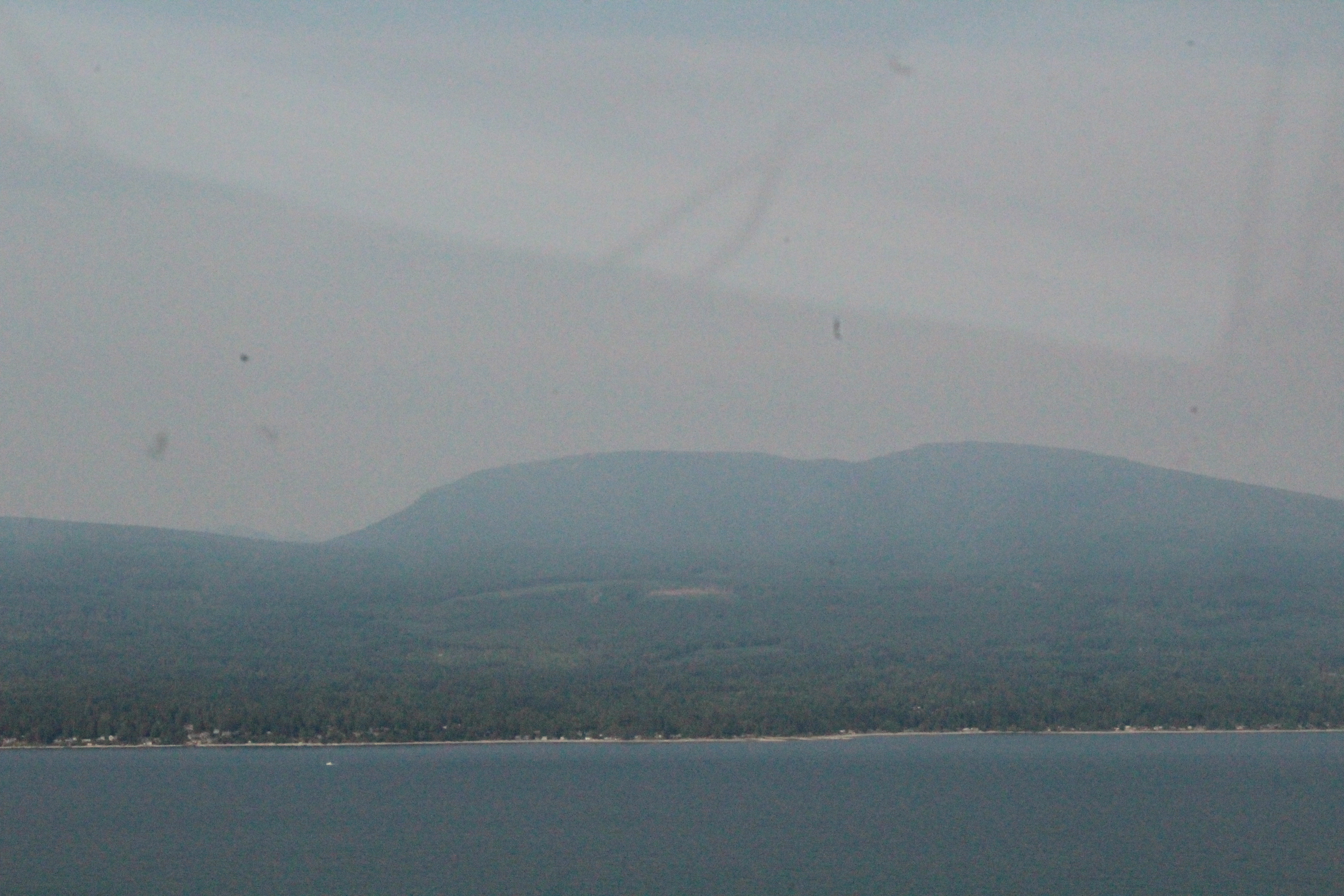
- Roberts Creek from the BC Ferry

- Location within British Columbia
- Coordinates: 49.42397°N 123.64795°W
- Country: Canada
- Province: British Columbia
- Regional District: Sunshine Coast

Area
  - Total: 20.97 km^{2} (8.10 sq mi)
- Elevation: 45 m (148 ft)

Population (2016)
  - Total: 3,421.
  - Density: 163.1/km^{2} (422.5/sq mi)
- Time zone: UTC−07:00 (PT)
- Area code: 604
- Website: www.robertscreek.com

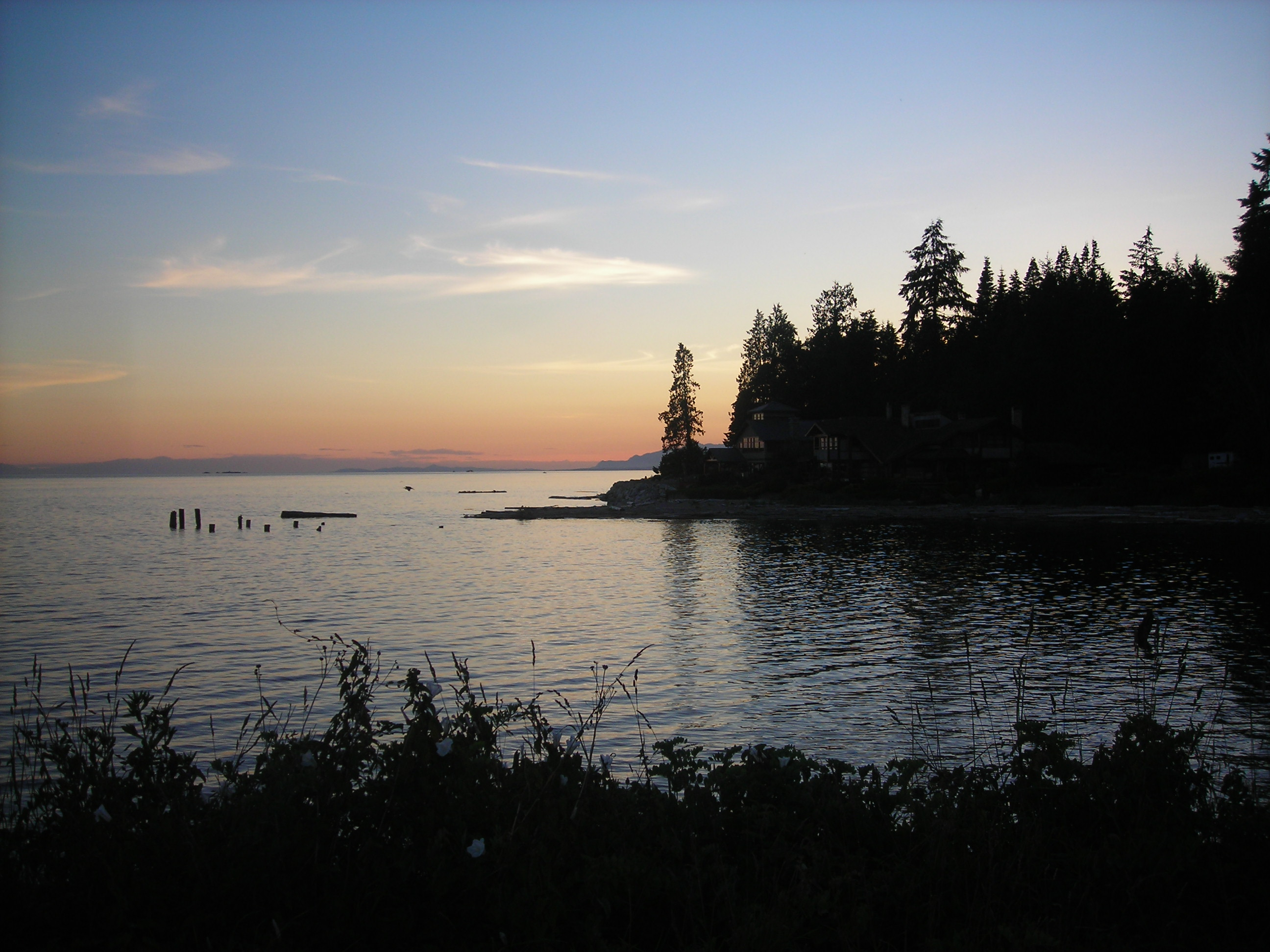
Sunset view from Roberts Creek

Roberts Creek (shíshálh Language: xwesam) is a community on the southern Sunshine Coast, in British Columbia, Canada, and within Electoral Area D of the Sunshine Coast Regional District.

Roberts Creek sits on the border of the shíshálh swiya (land, birthplace, "Territory" of the shíshálh Nation) and the territory of the Squamish Nation, roughly halfway between the Town of Gibsons and the District of Sechelt, the region's two main population centres.

== History ==
For thousands of years prior to European settlement, Roberts Creek was utilized seasonally by both the shíshálh and Sḵwx̱wú7mesh peoples. Several salmon-bearing creeks drain into the Salish Sea here, providing an excellent source of food.

Roberts Creek is named for William Roberts, the first European settler in the area.

During the 1960s and 70s, many American draft dodgers fleeing the Vietnam War settled in Roberts Creek. Several well-known communes formed here during this time period.

== Infrastructure ==
"Downtown" Roberts Creek (aka. 'The Heart of the Creek') is located near the beach where Lower Road, Roberts Creek Road, and Beach Avenue meet. It is home to the elementary school, the Royal Canadian Legion Branch 219, a post office, library, general store, cafe, restaurant, and other small businesses. Roberts Creek is also home to several bed and breakfast locations, farms, and other small community-run locations. The volunteer fire department and Roberts Creek Hall, home to live music, dances, community events and craft fairs, are situated at the top of Roberts Creek Road at the highway.

Roberts Creek Provincial Park is a popular campground. Roberts Creek is also home to several beaches including Roberts Creek Beach (bottom of Roberts Creek Road), the Roberts Creek Picnic Site (bottom of Flume Road at Beach Avenue), Henderson Beach and Stephens beach.

The Province, in collaboration with shíshálh Nation, completed the installation of dual-language she shashishalhem-English road signs along Highway 101 in 2020. Roberts Creek can be located by its traditional name, xwesam.

== Government ==
Roberts Creek is an unincorporated community. It is represented in the Sunshine Coast Regional District by a regional director, currently (2022) Kelly Backs, past (2019) Andreas Tize (since October 2018). Roberts Creek is a part of School District No. 46 (Sunshine Coast).

== Demographics ==
According to the 2016 census, the total population of the electoral area of Roberts Creek was 3,421. The population density was 23.8 people per square kilometre (143.6/km^{2}). There were 1,508 occupied private dwellings. The population grew by 5.5% from the 2011 census.

The 2016 census identified two separate areas: the 'Population centre' ['PC']; and the 'Designated place' ['DP']. The population centre had a population of 1,848; while the designated place had 1,867 people. Despite a nearly-equal population, the land area of the "Downtown" incorporated population centre (3.93/km^{2}) is much smaller than the unincorporated part of town (20.97/km^{2}). Like in many small West Coast Canadian communities, the average age in Roberts Creek (46.4 PC, 45.8 DP) is older than the national average (41.0 years).

== Arts and culture ==
Roberts Creek has an arts community, including a yearly Art Crawl, and a collection of artists and writers.

Roberts Creek's annual festival, Creek Daze, is held in mid-August and includes the Higgledy-Piggledy parade, a second-hand book sale in support of the notable local library, live music at the beach mandala and sales tables with crafts and food. Live music, craft shows and other events are held regularly at the community centre, Roberts Creek Hall.

Earth Day is held at the beach in April and is a popular event with the locals. Speakers, info tables and music celebrate the Earth and humanity's relationship with it.

The Day Out of Time Celebration is held on July 25 of each year. It is preceded by the yearly painting of the Roberts Creek Mandala (an all ages community art project), and culminates in a yearly dedication of the new mandala with a unique and inspiring community dance.

Roberts Creek is known for its horse area above the Highway 101, with riding trails all over the mountains, including a main feeder route to Electric Ranch. A horse arena club entertains the public at intervals at the end of this route on B+K Road. Many hundreds of horses use this route.

The xwesam/Roberts Creek Community Association (xRCAA) has been a cornerstone of the community since becoming a registered non-profit society in 1958. Their mission is to educate, entertain, and empower the 3,400 residents who proudly call “the Creek” home. For over six decades, the xRCAA has been the steward of key community spaces, including the Roberts Creek Community Hall, the Roberts Creek Community Library, and the downtown greenspace with its iconic gazebo. The xRCCA holds numerous community events annually, including Earth Day, Creek Daze, Eek the Creek family Halloween party, Christmas Community Dinner at the Hall, and photos with Santa.

== Notable people ==
- Julia Budd, mixed martial artist
