= The Grieving Mother =

The Grieving Mother may refer to:

- Our Lady of Sorrow or Mater Dolorosa, one of the names of Mary in the Catholic Church
- The Grieving Mother (sculpture), also known as Our Grieving Mother, prehistoric sculpture of the shíshálh First Nation in Canada
