= Buccaneer Bay =

Buccaneer Bay may refer to:

- Buccaneer Bay (radio play), a 1944 Australian radio play by Alexander Turner
- Buccaneer Bay, a pirate themed children's play area at Wet'n'Wild Gold Coast
- Buccaneer Bay, a pirate themed children's play area at Zoombezi Bay
- Buccaneer Bay, a pirate themed children's play area at Six Flags White Water
- Buccaneer Bay, a pirate themed children's play area at Oceans of Fun
- Buccaneer Bay, a water park at Weeki Wachee Springs
- Buccaneer Bay, an area with nightly staged pirate battles at Treasure Island Hotel and Casino
- Buccaneer Bay, an unincorporated community in Cass County, Nebraska

== See also ==
- Tampa Bay Buccaneers, an American football team
- Buccaneer Bay Provincial Park, in British Columbia, Canada
- Bay City Buccaneers, a member American football team of Gridiron Victoria
