= Tems swiya Museum =

First Nations museum in Canada

Coordinates: 49.474°N 123.751°W

The tems swiya Museum is a First Nations museum owned and operated by the shíshálh Nation, and located in Sechelt (ch'atlich), British Columbia, Canada.

The museum's name means "Our World" in she shashishalhem, the shíshálh language. Its collection includes cedar baskets, art, photographs, audio recordings, and archaeological collections which include stone tools and the prehistoric sculpture known as The Grieving Mother. The museum is part of a cultural and administrative complex on the site of the former St. Augustine's Indian Residential School, which closed in 1975, the last remains of which were burned in 2008.

== The Grieving Mother ==
The Grieving Mother or Our Grieving Mother is considered the museum's "most exceptional artifact" and Wilson Duff called it "the outstanding prehistoric sculpture in British Columbia". It is a mortuary stone about 3,500 years old, commemorating a chief's wife who drowned herself after the death of her only son. The stone was discovered in 1921 and was sold to the Museum of Vancouver (MOV) by chief Dan Paull in 1926 for $25 for its safekeeping. In the MOV it was known as the Sechelt Image. The shíshálh had requested its return in 1976 but at that time had no suitable accommodation for it, and the MOV offered to make a replica for them. The tems swiya Museum opened in 1994 and negotiations for the stone's return resumed in 2010. The stone was returned to the shíshálh in October 2010. Leaders went to the museum to prepare the stone for its journey with prayers and rituals, and it was wrapped in a hand-woven Salish blanket and packaged in a crate lined with cedar. Its return to the shíshálh's land was celebrated with a ceremony and feast.
