= Halfmoon Bay, British Columbia =

Human settlement in British Columbia, Canada

Coordinates: 49°31′N 123°55′W

Halfmoon Bay (xwilkway in she shashishalhem) is a small community in British Columbia, Canada, within the shíshálh swiya (the lands, birthplace, or "Territory" of the shíshálh Nation), and Electoral Area B of the Sunshine Coast Regional District. The population consists of approximately 2,800 people, including a large number of seasonal residents. The community is named for the large scalloped bay on which it sits, which is sheltered by South Thormanby Island and Vancouver Island.

The community can be accessed via Redrooffs Road, so-named after a popular local resort which once featured a cluster of cabins, all with red roofs. Some homes are also located off Highway 101.

Halfmoon Bay Elementary School, the community's only elementary school, has 200–300 students ranging from kindergarten to grade seven. The school performs extremely well for one of its size, achieving BC Foundation Skills Assessment (FSA) scores above those of many private schools. Halfmoon Bay secondary students may choose to attend one of the three local high schools: Pender Harbour Secondary, Chatelech Secondary, and Elphinstone Secondary.

Halfmoon Bay was once named Priestland Bay after the Priestland family who settled in the area in 1899. Its present-day English name comes from the shape of the bay.

== Climate ==
Halfmoon Bay has one of the mildest climates in Canada and is classified as zone 9b on the Cold Hardiness Map. It has a pleasant climate that supports many subtropical plants.

Climate data for Halfmoon Bay (1981-2010)
| Month | Jan | Feb | Mar | Apr | May | Jun | Jul | Aug | Sep | Oct | Nov | Dec | Year |
|---|---|---|---|---|---|---|---|---|---|---|---|---|---|
| Record high °C (°F) | 14.5 (58.1) | 14.3 (57.7) | 17.5 (63.5) | 21.0 (69.8) | 28.4 (83.1) | 30.2 (86.4) | 30.0 (86.0) | 32.2 (90.0) | 26.6 (79.9) | 21.1 (70.0) | 15.6 (60.1) | 14.0 (57.2) | 32.2 (90.0) |
| Mean daily maximum °C (°F) | 7.1 (44.8) | 7.7 (45.9) | 9.6 (49.3) | 12.4 (54.3) | 16.1 (61.0) | 19.0 (66.2) | 21.4 (70.5) | 21.3 (70.3) | 18.1 (64.6) | 12.9 (55.2) | 9.0 (48.2) | 6.8 (44.2) | 13.5 (56.3) |
| Daily mean °C (°F) | 5.4 (41.7) | 5.7 (42.3) | 7.3 (45.1) | 9.7 (49.5) | 13.0 (55.4) | 16.0 (60.8) | 18.2 (64.8) | 18.2 (64.8) | 15.2 (59.4) | 10.8 (51.4) | 7.3 (45.1) | 5.2 (41.4) | 11.0 (51.8) |
| Mean daily minimum °C (°F) | 3.6 (38.5) | 3.6 (38.5) | 4.9 (40.8) | 6.9 (44.4) | 10.0 (50.0) | 12.9 (55.2) | 14.9 (58.8) | 15.1 (59.2) | 12.3 (54.1) | 8.7 (47.7) | 5.5 (41.9) | 3.5 (38.3) | 8.5 (47.3) |
| Record low °C (°F) | −7.2 (19.0) | −10.1 (13.8) | −3.6 (25.5) | −1.1 (30.0) | 2.5 (36.5) | 5.6 (42.1) | 9.0 (48.2) | 8.9 (48.0) | 3.9 (39.0) | −0.4 (31.3) | −7.3 (18.9) | −11.7 (10.9) | −11.7 (10.9) |
| Average precipitation mm (inches) | 135.5 (5.33) | 92.2 (3.63) | 90.1 (3.55) | 69.9 (2.75) | 62.5 (2.46) | 53.9 (2.12) | 34.7 (1.37) | 35.7 (1.41) | 48.7 (1.92) | 106.1 (4.18) | 165.0 (6.50) | 134.5 (5.30) | 1,028.8 (40.50) |
Source: Environment Canada
