= Porpoise Bay Provincial Park =

Provincial park in British Columbia, Canada

- IUCN category II (national park)
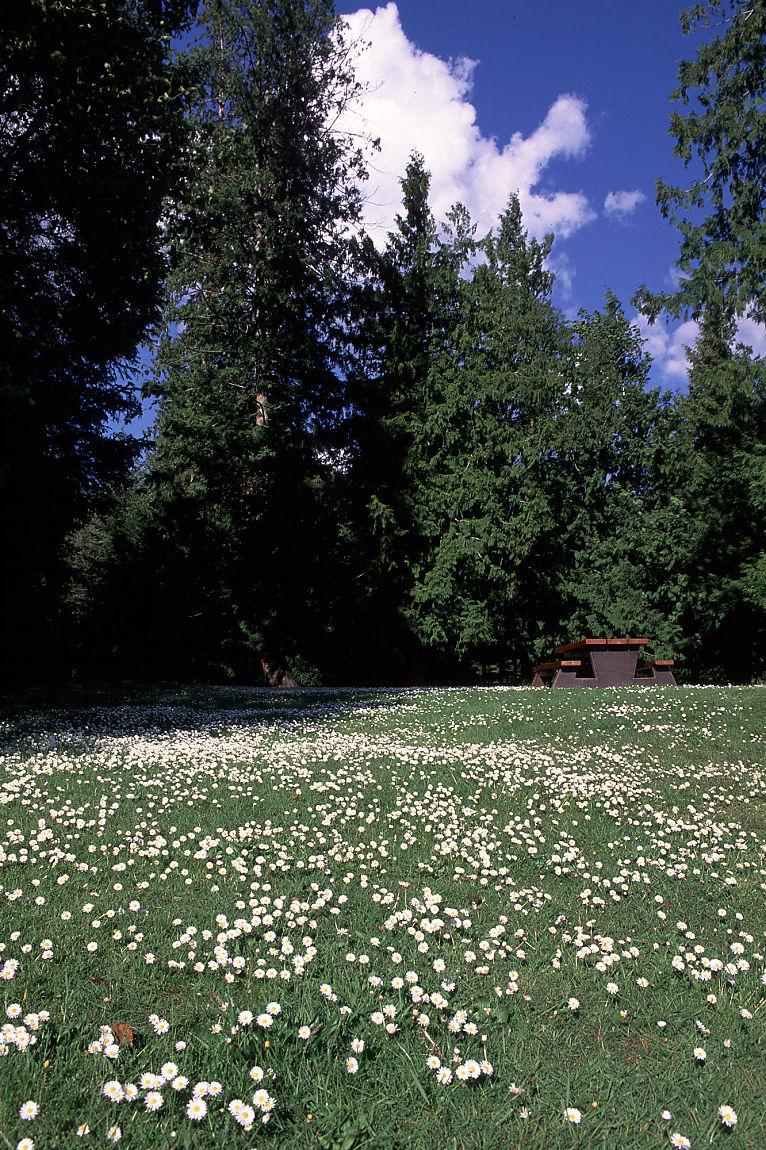
- Panoramic view

- Location within British Columbia
- Interactive map of Porpoise Bay Provincial Park
- Location: British Columbia, Canada
- Nearest city: Sechelt
- Coordinates: 49°30′26″N 123°44′57″W
- Area: 0.61 km^{2} (0.24 sq mi)
- Established: January 29, 1971
- Governing body: BC Parks
- Website: bcparks.ca/porpoise-bay-park/

Porpoise Bay Provincial Park is a provincial park in British Columbia, Canada near the town of Sechelt. Features of the park include a campsite with group and walk-in camping opportunities, as well as opportunities for paddling, swimming and observing nature.

The area of Porpoise Bay Provincial Park has historically been used by peoples of the Shíshálh Nation. The park was established on January 29, 1971 after the land was purchased from a family in 1966.

Second-growth forests are found in the park, with Douglas fir, western hemlock, cedar, maple and alder trees. Chum and Coho salmon may be found spawning in waterways in the park. An estuary in the park also supports and number of shorebird species.
