= Shíshálh Nation Government District =

shíshálh Nation Government District
- First Nations government district
- Interactive map of shíshálh Nation Government District
- Coordinates: 49.6812°N 124.1833°W
- Country: Canada
- Province: British Columbia
- Region: Sunshine Coast
- Regional district: Sunshine Coast qathet
- Incorporated: March 17, 1988

Government
  - lhe hiwus (Chief): yalxwemult (Lenora Joe)
  - hihewus (Councillor): Raquel Joe
  - hihewus (Councillor): Rochelle Jones
  - hihewus (Councillor): Keith Julius
  - hihewus (Councillor): Philip Paul

Area (2011)
  - Total: 11.04 km^{2} (4.26 sq mi)

Population (2011)
  - Total: 819
  - Density: 28.6/km^{2} (74.2/sq mi)
  - Sunshine Coast portions: 797
  - Sunshine Coast portions density: 73.8/km^{2} (191/sq mi)
  - Powell River portion: 22
  - Powell River portion density: 90.5/km^{2} (234/sq mi)
- Time zone: UTC−07:00 (PT)
- Website: Official website

Shíshálh Nation Government District, formerly known as Sechelt Indian Government District, is a First Nations government district administered by the shíshálh Nation, and located in the Sunshine Coast region of southwest British Columbia, Canada. It was incorporated on March 17, 1988 and consists of 33 separate land parcels, of which 32 are located within the Sunshine Coast Regional District and one located within the qathet Regional District.

== Demographics ==
In the 2021 Census of Population conducted by Statistics Canada, the shíshálh Nation Government District had a population of 765 living in 333 of its 377 total private dwellings, a change of 9.8% from its 2016 population of 697. With a land area of 11.03 km^{2} (4.26 sq mi), it had a population density of 69.4/km^{2} (179.6/sq mi) in 2021.

== See also ==
- List of communities in British Columbia
- List of Indian reserves in British Columbia
- List of municipalities in British Columbia
