= Sechelt =

Town on the Sunshine Coast of British Columbia, Canada

Sechelt ch'atlich
- District municipality
- District of Sechelt
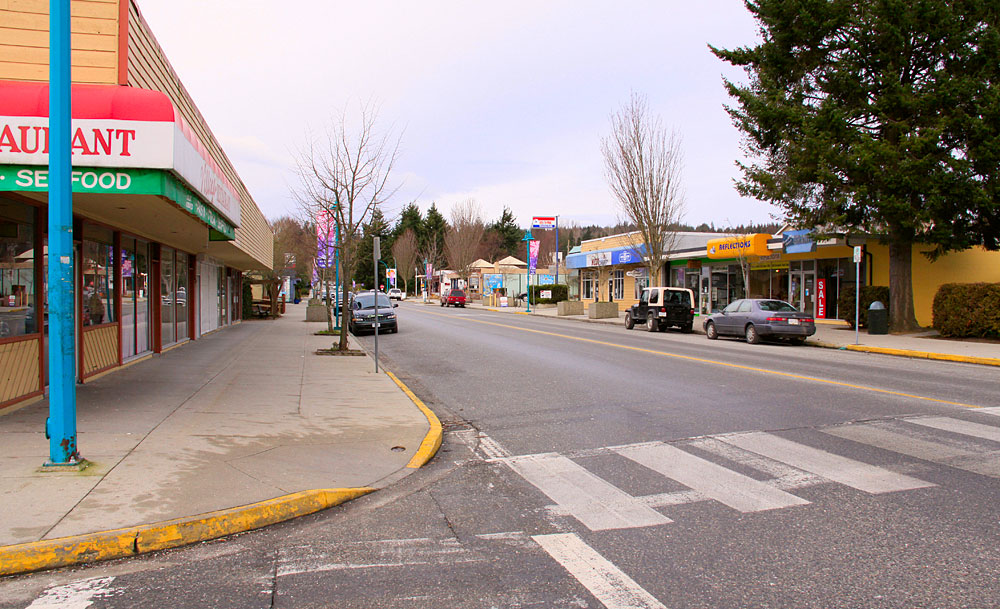
- Downtown Sechelt in 2011
- Motto: Blessed by Sun and Seas
- Location of Sechelt in British Columbia
- Coordinates: 49°28′27″N 123°45′15″W
- Country: Canada
- Province: British Columbia
- Region: Sunshine Coast
- Regional District: Sunshine Coast RD
- Founded: 1862 (Roman Catholic mission)
- Incorporated (Village): Feb. 15, 1956
- District Municipality: June 30, 1986

Government
  - Mayor: John Henderson
  - Governing body: Sechelt Municipal Council
  - MLAs: Randene Neill, NDP

Area
  - Total: 39.71 km^{2} (15.33 sq mi)
- Elevation: 8 m (26 ft)

Population (2021)
  - Total: 10,847
  - Density: 212.9/km^{2} (551/sq mi)
- Time zone: UTC−07:00 (PT)
- Postal code span: V7Z and V0N 3A0
- Area code: +1-604
- Website: www.sechelt.ca

Sechelt (/ˈsiːʃɛlt/; Sechelt: ch'atlich) is a district municipality located on the lower Sunshine Coast of British Columbia. Approximately 50 kilometres (31 mi) northwest of Vancouver, it is accessible from mainland British Columbia by a 40-minute ferry trip between Horseshoe Bay and Langdale, and a 25-minute drive from Langdale along Highway 101, also known as the Sunshine Coast Highway. The name Sechelt is derived from the she shashishalhem word shíshálh, the name of the First Nations people who first settled the area thousands of years ago.

The original Village of Sechelt was incorporated on February 15, 1956. Sechelt later expanded its boundaries in 1986 with the inclusion of a number of adjacent unincorporated areas. The District of Sechelt, as it is known today, encompasses 39.71 square kilometres (15.33 sq mi) at the isthmus of the Sechelt Peninsula, between the southern tip of Sechelt Inlet (Porpoise Bay) and the Strait of Georgia that separates the provincial mainland from Vancouver Island.

Sechelt is a seaside community with approximately 35 kilometres (22 mi) of Pacific Ocean shoreline that extends primarily along the coastline of the Sunshine Coast, and is bounded to the west and east by the unincorporated communities of Halfmoon Bay and Roberts Creek, respectively. The 2016 Canadian census placed its population at 10,200. The regional offices of the Sunshine Coast Regional District of British Columbia are located in Sechelt.

Although its population is relatively small for its geographical area, Sechelt has several distinct neighbourhoods. From east to west, they are ts'uḵw'um (Wilson Creek), Davis Bay, Selma Park, the original Village of Sechelt, and West Sechelt. Several neighbourhoods around Sechelt Inlet were also included in Sechelt's 1986 incorporation as a district; these include West Porpoise Bay, East Porpoise Bay, Sandy Hook, Tillicum Bay and Tuwanek. The shíshálh Nation Government District, which contains a substantial commercial district, is immediately east of Sechelt's "downtown" village.

== History ==
The original inhabitants of Sechelt are the shíshálh Nation, a British Columbian First Nation. The town of Sechelt is known as "ch'atlich" in she shashishalhem (the shíshálh language). For thousands of years, the shíshálh People practiced a hunting and gathering subsistence strategy, making extensive use of the natural food resources located around ch'atlich, and its strategic location for access into the Sechelt Inlet.

Europeans began settling in the ch'atlich area in the 1860s and by the 1880s, developing an active centre of the logging and fishing industries with the construction of sawmills and wharves. With sustained contact with European settlers, the shíshálh People's semi-nomadic way of life began to be substituted for a more sedentary life in Sechelt, a change heavily influenced by the establishment of a Roman Catholic church by the Oblates of Mary Immaculate. Our Lady of the Rosary was completed in 1890 and cost the Sechelt people a sum of $8,000 to construct. In 1906, this church was destroyed in a fire, and a year later another church was erected in its place called Our Lady of Lourdes, but this too was destroyed by fire in October, 1970.

The natural beauty of the Sunshine Coast soon attracted tourists, who arrived at the wharves at Trail Bay via steamship. The construction of the original provincial highway in 1952, Highway 101, now also known as Sunshine Coast Highway, and the accompanying commencement of ferry service to Horseshoe Bay (near Vancouver) and Powell River (hence to Vancouver Island) accelerated tourism and residential growth, which continues today.

In 2019, the Seawatch subdivision was evacuated due to a risk of sinkholes. The subdivision was built in 2006 and covenants were placed on the land to release Sechelt from claims relating to the land, including sinkholes. Since the evacuation, multiple lawsuits have been filed between the 14 homeowners, Sechelt, the province of British Columbia, and the property developer over issues including an unnecessarily long state of emergency (awards granted to 2 residents), Sechelt's claim that residents have an obligation to repair infrastructure and pay legal fees (ongoing), Sechelt's withholding of documents (set of documents released to resident), covenants on the properties (deemed valid), and Sechelt's approval of the subdivision (negligence not found).

== Geography ==
Sechelt is a municipality on the Sunshine Coast, west northwest of Vancouver BC. Sechelt is located on an isthmus, a narrow strip of land that bridges between the Sechelt Peninsula and the BC mainland. This isthmus is bounded on the north by the Sechelt Inlet, and on the south by the Strait of Georgia.

The municipality consists of 3 non-contiguous areas, all separated by the shíshálh Nation Government District.

=== Climate ===
Sechelt's climate is Cfb (Temperate Oceanic) according to the Köppen climate classification, and is designated as USDA Plant Hardiness Zone 9a (8b inland) by Environment Canada. It has the warmest nights in Canada.

Climate data for Merry Island Lightstation (1981–2010 normals, extremes 1960–present) (Note: 1981–2010 normals are for Merry Island Lightstation, while extreme high and low temperatures are from Sechelt Aut (August 2007 to present), and Merry Island Lightstation (February 1960 to present).)
Month	Jan	Feb	Mar	Apr	May	Jun	Jul	Aug	Sep	Oct	Nov	Dec	Year
Record high humidex	15.3	13.3	14.9	19.4	33.3	46.0	38.0	37.0	35.0	22.1	16.3	12.2	46.0
Record high °C (°F)	14.5 (58.1)	14.3 (57.7)	17.5 (63.5)	21.0 (69.8)	28.4 (83.1)	40.8 (105.4)	35.3 (95.5)	35.4 (95.7)	33.0 (91.4)	21.1 (70.0)	15.6 (60.1)	14.0 (57.2)	40.8 (105.4)
Mean daily maximum °C (°F)	7.1 (44.8)	7.7 (45.9)	9.6 (49.3)	12.4 (54.3)	16.1 (61.0)	19.0 (66.2)	21.4 (70.5)	21.3 (70.3)	18.1 (64.6)	12.9 (55.2)	9.0 (48.2)	6.8 (44.2)	13.5 (56.3)
Daily mean °C (°F)	5.4 (41.7)	5.7 (42.3)	7.3 (45.1)	9.7 (49.5)	13.0 (55.4)	16.0 (60.8)	18.2 (64.8)	18.2 (64.8)	15.2 (59.4)	10.8 (51.4)	7.3 (45.1)	5.2 (41.4)	11.0 (51.8)
Mean daily minimum °C (°F)	3.6 (38.5)	3.6 (38.5)	4.9 (40.8)	6.9 (44.4)	10.0 (50.0)	12.9 (55.2)	14.9 (58.8)	15.1 (59.2)	12.3 (54.1)	8.7 (47.7)	5.5 (41.9)	3.5 (38.3)	8.5 (47.3)
Record low °C (°F)	−7.2 (19.0)	−10.1 (13.8)	−3.6 (25.5)	−1.1 (30.0)	2.5 (36.5)	5.6 (42.1)	9.0 (48.2)	8.9 (48.0)	3.9 (39.0)	−0.4 (31.3)	−7.3 (18.9)	−11.7 (10.9)	−11.7 (10.9)
Record low wind chill	−15	−13	−7	0	0	0	0	0	0	0	−14	−21	−21
Average precipitation mm (inches)	135.5 (5.33)	92.2 (3.63)	90.1 (3.55)	69.9 (2.75)	62.5 (2.46)	53.9 (2.12)	34.7 (1.37)	35.7 (1.41)	48.7 (1.92)	106.1 (4.18)	165.0 (6.50)	134.5 (5.30)	1,028.8 (40.50)
Average rainfall mm (inches)	130.1 (5.12)	88.5 (3.48)	87.8 (3.46)	69.9 (2.75)	62.4 (2.46)	53.9 (2.12)	34.7 (1.37)	35.7 (1.41)	48.7 (1.92)	106.0 (4.17)	161.3 (6.35)	127.0 (5.00)	1,006 (39.61)
Average snowfall cm (inches)	5.3 (2.1)	3.8 (1.5)	2.4 (0.9)	0.1 (0.0)	0.1 (0.0)	0 (0)	0 (0)	0 (0)	0 (0)	0.1 (0.0)	3.6 (1.4)	7.5 (3.0)	22.8 (9.0)
Average precipitation days (≥ 0.2 mm)	20.0	15.6	18.0	15.0	13.2	11.0	6.3	6.8	8.7	16.2	20.7	19.8	171.3
Average rainy days	19.0	14.9	17.7	14.9	13.2	11.0	6.3	6.8	8.7	16.1	20.2	19.0	167.8
Average snowy days (≥ 0.2 cm)	1.7	1.3	0.5	0.1	0.1	0.0	0.0	0.0	0.0	0.1	0.9	1.2	5.9
Mean monthly sunshine hours	54.1	87.0	130.3	180.6	228.3	220.7	282.0	270.8	214.6	117.4	57.4	50.4	1,893.6
Percentage possible sunshine	20.1	30.5	35.4	43.9	48.0	45.4	57.5	60.6	56.6	35.0	20.9	19.7	39.5

== Demographics ==
In the 2021 Canadian census conducted by Statistics Canada, Sechelt had a population of 10,847 living in 5,128 of its 5,738 total private dwellings, a change of 6.2% from its 2016 population of 10,216. With a land area of 39.02 km^{2} (15.07 sq mi), it had a population density of 278 people per square kilometre (720 people/sq mi) in 2021.

=== Ethnicity ===
Panethnic groups in the District of Sechelt (2001–2021)
Panethnic group	2021		2016		2011		2006		2001	
Panethnic group	Pop.	%	Pop.	%	Pop.	%	Pop.	%	Pop.	%
European (Note: Statistic includes all persons that did not make up part of a visible minority or an indigenous identity.)	8,805	82.99%	8,500	84.92%	8,345	91.65%	7,665	92.02%	7,290	94.68%
Indigenous	525	4.95%	605	6.04%	330	3.62%	280	3.36%	240	3.12%
Southeast Asian (Note: Statistic includes total responses of "Filipino" and "Southeast Asian" under visible minority section on census.)	455	4.29%	315	3.15%	245	2.69%	95	1.14%	35	0.45%
East Asian (Note: Statistic includes total responses of "Chinese", "Korean", and "Japanese" under visible minority section on census.)	355	3.35%	325	3.25%	130	1.43%	115	1.38%	80	1.04%
South Asian	250	2.36%	110	1.1%	25	0.27%	10	0.12%	15	0.19%
Middle Eastern (Note: Statistic includes total responses of "West Asian" and "Arab" under visible minority section on census.)	80	0.75%	25	0.25%	0	0%	40	0.48%	0	0%
African	70	0.66%	30	0.3%	0	0%	55	0.66%	35	0.45%
Latin American	45	0.42%	25	0.25%	0	0%	60	0.72%	0	0%
Other/multiracial (Note: Statistic includes total responses of "Visible minority, n.i.e." and "Multiple visible minorities" under visible minority section on census.)	95	0.9%	85	0.85%	0	0%	30	0.36%	10	0.13%
Total responses	10,610	97.82%	10,010	97.98%	9,105	98%	8,330	98.53%	7,700	99.04%
Total population	10,847	100%	10,216	100%	9,291	100%	8,454	100%	7,775	100%
Note: Totals greater than 100% due to multiple origin responses.

=== Religion ===
According to the 2021 census, religious groups in Sechelt included:

- Irreligion (5,955 persons or 56.1%)
- Christianity (4,010 persons or 37.8%)
- Buddhism (170 persons or 1.6%)
- Sikhism (150 persons or 1.4%)
- Islam (75 persons or 0.7%)
- Judaism (95 persons or 0.9%)
- Hinduism (40 persons or 0.4%)
- Other (125 persons or 1.2%)

== Attractions ==
The village itself, the original locus of Sechelt, includes Clayton's Heritage Market (a grocery store named after its pioneering family owners) in Trail Bay Mall. A new public library with municipal hall opened in 1997, and a combined provincial courthouse and Royal Canadian Mounted Police (RCMP) building, and a public recreation aquatic centre serving Sechelt and the surrounding area, have also been completed since that time.

Immediately to the east of the downtown village is the shíshálh Nation Government District municipality, home of the tems swiya Museum and gift shop, a shopping centre, movie theatre.

Other Sechelt area landmarks include:

- Sechelt (shíshálh) Hospital (originally St. Mary's, the Sunshine Coast's first hospital, renamed in 2015)
- A satellite campus of Capilano University
- The local regional government offices of the Sunshine Coast Regional District
- Sechelt airport, presently a small regional aerodrome, a few kilometres (miles) east of the downtown village in the ts'uḵw'um (Wilson Creek) neighbourhood
- Davis Bay, with a public seawall walk, wharf, and lands for a public waterfront park, presently known as Mission Point Park
- Sechelt Quarry, operated by Heidelberg Materials, one of the largest open-pit gravel quarries in North America.

== Recreation and tourism ==
Like other parts of the Sunshine Coast, Sechelt is known for its natural beauty, and is a popular destination for outdoor activities that include kayaking, diving, snowshoeing and skiing, hiking and backpacking, camping and mountain biking. There is an 18-hole public golf course, and a number of small marinas are available around Sechelt Inlet. Sechelt has several municipal parks, and larger provincial parks are nearby.

Auto enthusiasts come from around the Pacific Northwest for Sechelt's annual Sleepy Hollow Rod Run, and the "Show and Shine" held in conjunction with the August drag races at Sechelt Airport.

== Notable parks and conservation areas ==
=== Hidden Groves ===
The Hidden Groves area of old growth forest adjoins the Sandy Hook neighbourhood, 6 km (4 miles) from downtown Sechelt and 2 km (1¼ miles) from Porpoise Bay Provincial Park. It has trails for walkers and hikers of various abilities, from easy walks of around 15 minutes to more strenuous treks of 3 or 4 kilometres (about 2 miles). A wheelchair-accessible trail of 480 metres (525 yards) into the Ancient Grove area is also suitable for people with walkers, strollers, and those not so fit. A second 400-metre (yard) accessibility trail loops from the entrance kiosk through pristine forest and back.

The entrance kiosk features a large map of the trails. All trails are well-marked and maintained. There are signs at all intersections with directions, maps and guides.

The Groves includes giant ancient trees, maple wetland, and rocky promontories with views of Vancouver Island and Sechelt Inlet. There is parking at the entrance to the trails. It is a legal off-leash area for dogs.

The Sechelt Heritage Forest portion of the Groves is a protected interpretive forest as designated by the Province. Hidden Grove is currently part of the BC Forest and under a special tenure to the Sechelt Community Forest, which has declared the Grove a special high-priority recreational area and mandated it shall not be logged. Volunteers provide daily maintenance.

=== Porpoise Bay Provincial Park ===
Porpoise Bay Provincial Park is some 4 km (2½ miles) north of downtown Sechelt, on the east side of Sechelt Inlet. It is characterized by second-growth forest, open grassy areas and sandy beaches.

== Education ==
The School District 46 Sunshine Coast operates public schools in the region.

The Conseil scolaire francophone de la Colombie-Britannique operates two Francophone schools in that city: the école du Pacifique primary school and école secondaire Chatelech.

== Gallery ==
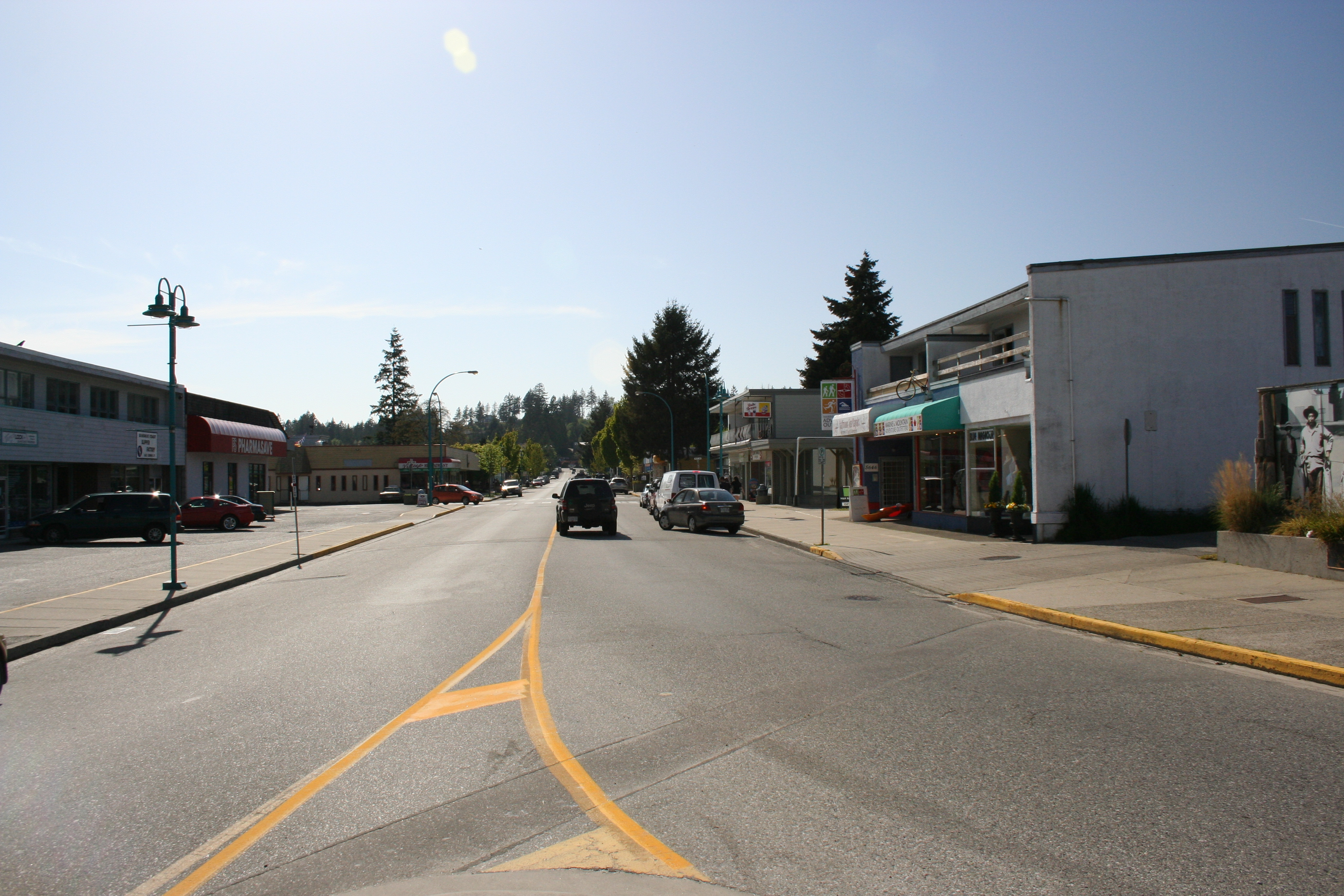
Cowrie Street, the main village thoroughfare

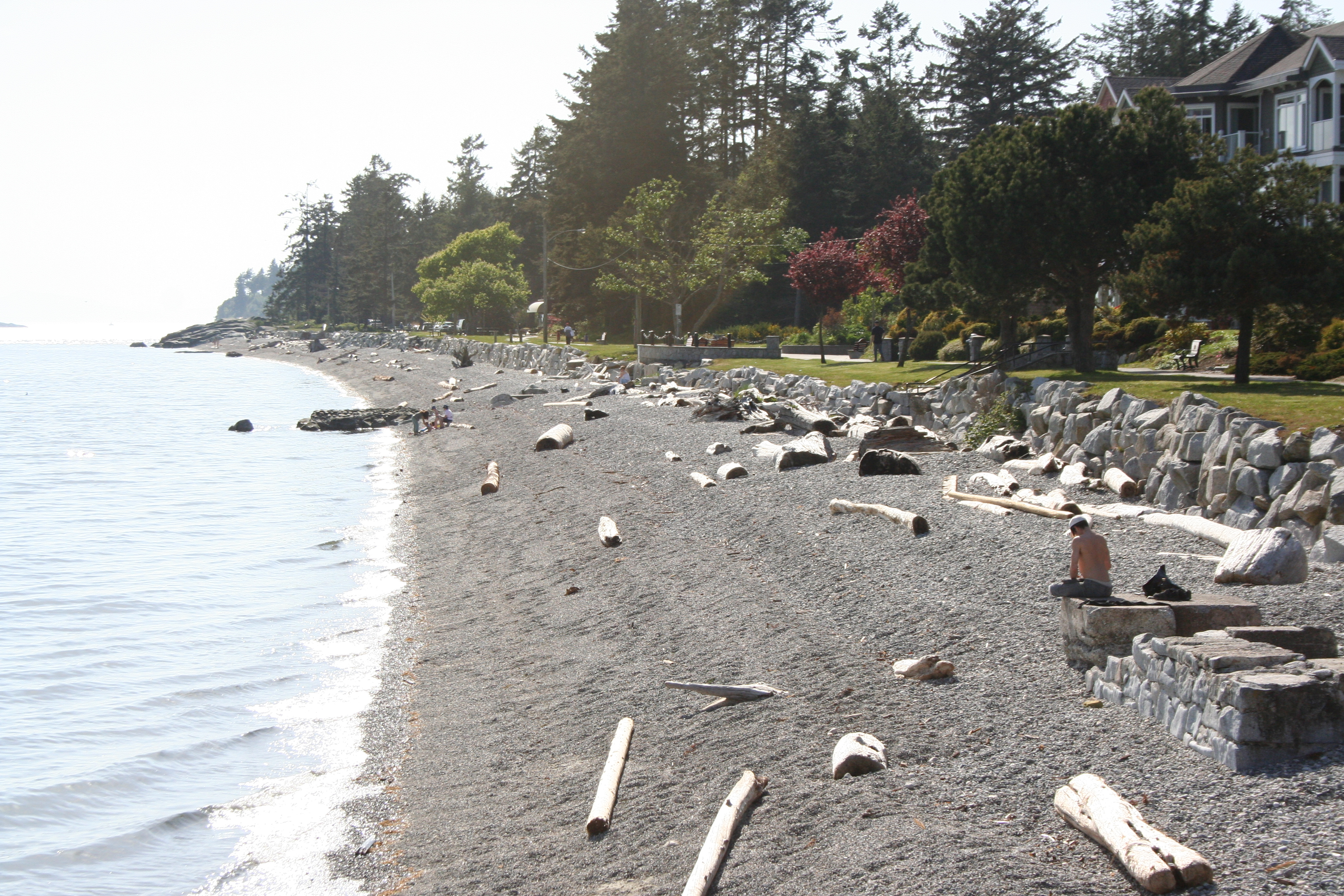
Trail Bay, and the seawall which runs alongside it, at the southern end of the village.

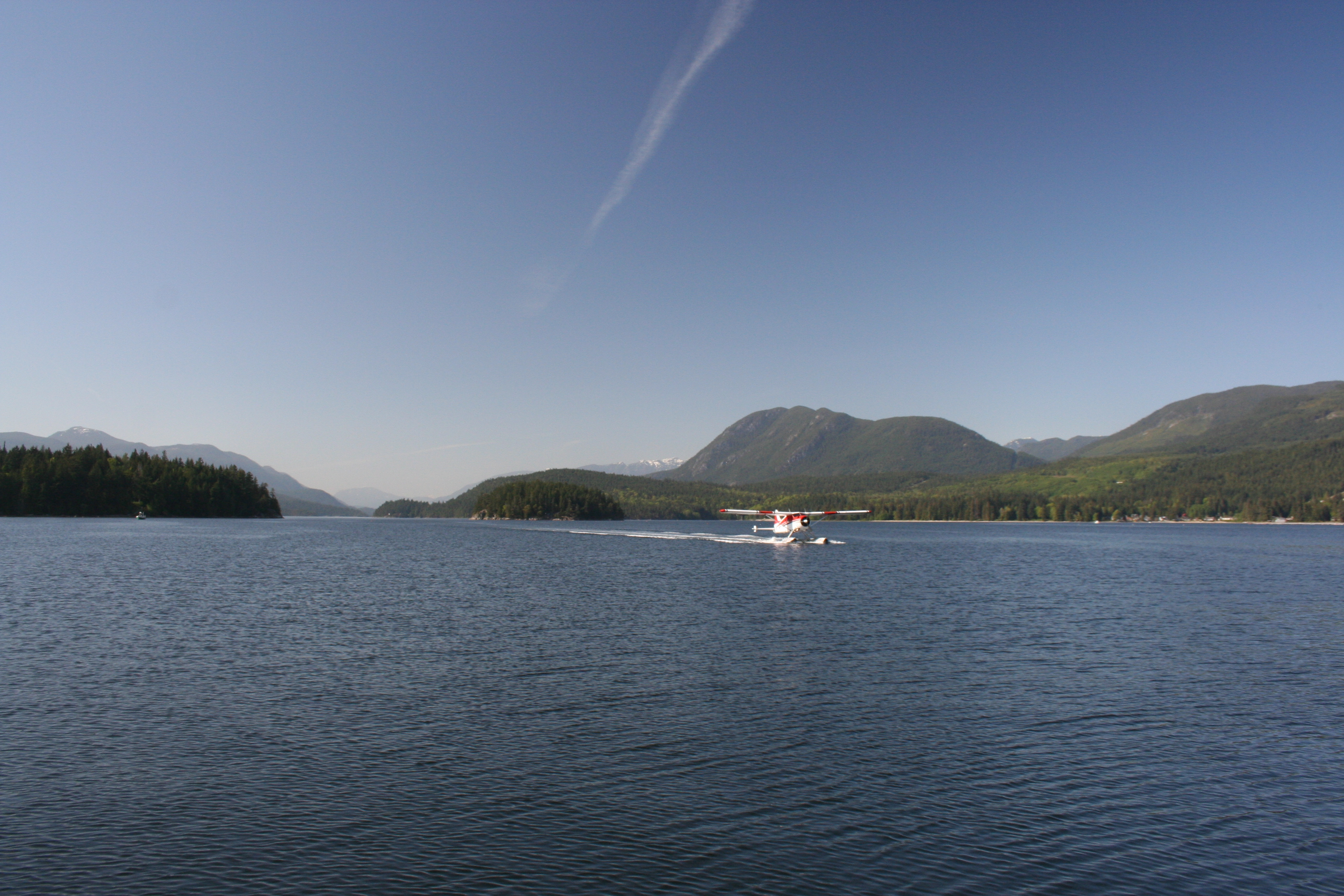
Porpoise Bay, at the southern end of Sechelt Inlet, located on the north end of the village.

== See also ==
- Sechelt Peninsula
- Sechelt Inlet
- Porpoise Bay Provincial Park
- Mount Richardson Provincial Park
