= Shíshálh Nation =

First Nation in British Columbia, Canada

shishálh Nation
- Band No. 551

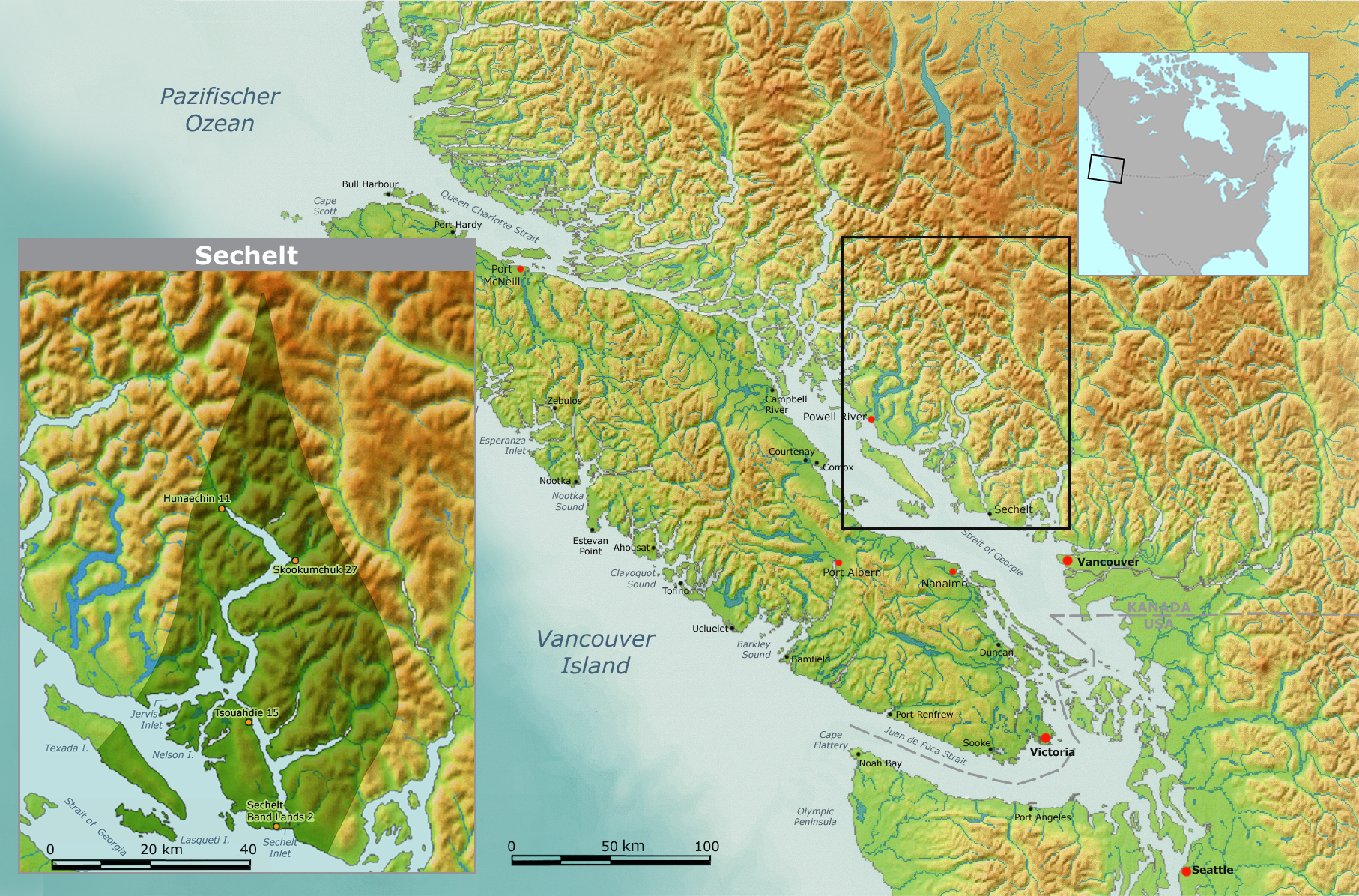
- The shíshálh Nation swiya (world, "Territory") is located to the northwest of Vancouver, British Columbia (left inset)
- People: Coast Salish
- Headquarters: ch'atlich (Sechelt)
- Province: British Columbia

Land
- Main reserve: Sechelt 2
- Reserves: List: Bargain Harbour 24; Boulder Island 25; Chelohsin 13; Chickwat 9; Cokqueneets 23; Egmont 26; Hunaechin 11; Klaalth 5; Klayekwim 6, 6A, 7, 8; Oalthkyim 4; Paykulum 14; Sallahlus 20, 20A; Saughanaught 22; Sawquamain 19A; Sekaleton 21, 21A; Shannon Creek 28; Skookumchuck 27; Skwawkweehm 17; Slayathlum 16; Smeshalin 18; Suahbin 19; Swaycalse 3; Swaywelat 12, 12A; Tchahchelailthetenum 10; Tsawcome 1; Tsooahdie 15
- Land area: 10.3 km^{2} (4.0 sq mi)

Population (2025)
- On reserve: 607
- On other land: 31
- Off reserve: 1054
- Total population: 1692

Government
- Chief: Lenora Joe
- Council: 2023-2026: Keith Julius; Raquel Joe; Rochelle Jones; Philip Paul

Website
- shishalh.com

- People: shíshálh
- Language: she sháshíshálhem
- Country: shíshálh swíya

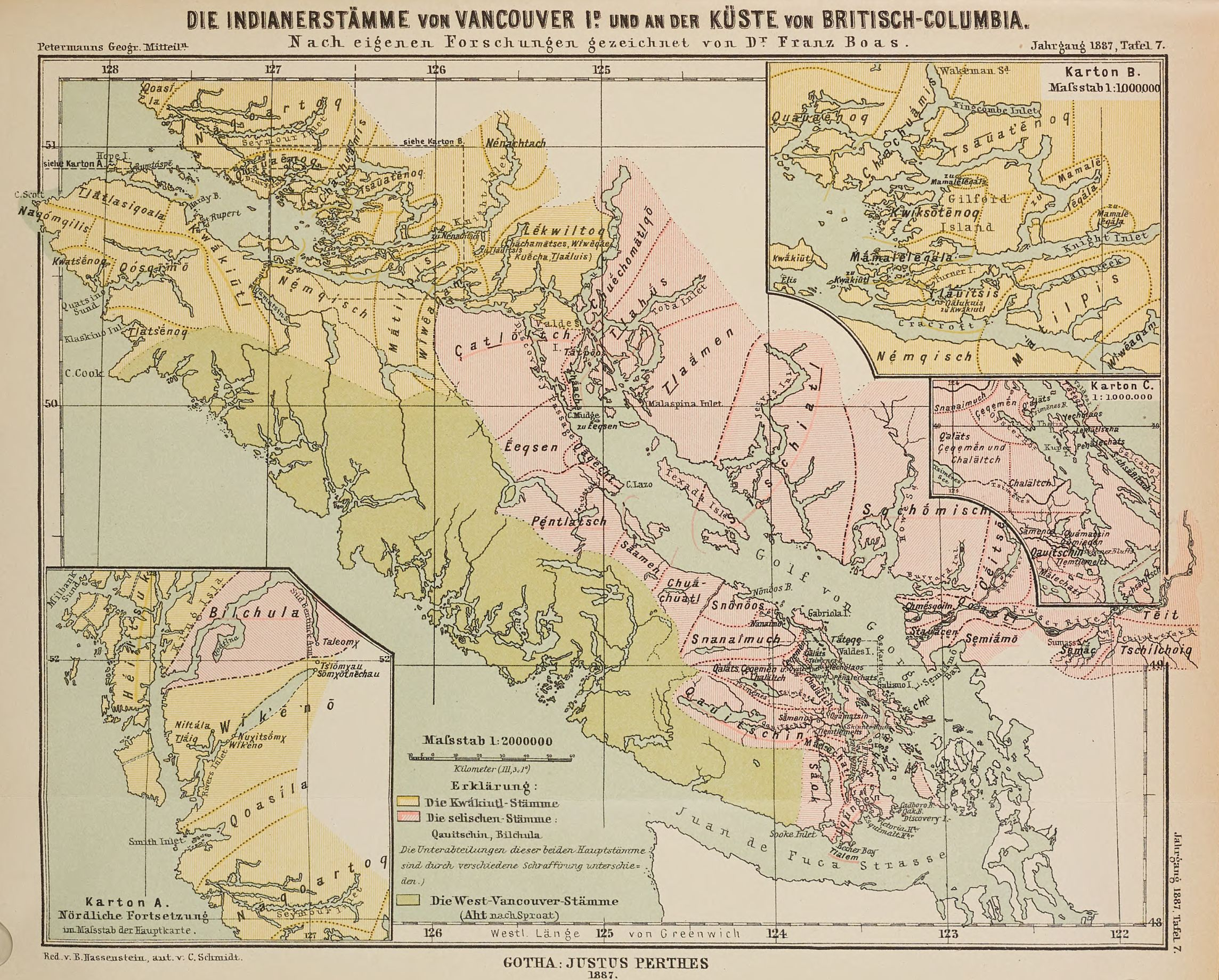
Dr. Franz Boas 1887 map showing Sechelt territories

The shíshálh Nation (also spelled Shishalh) is a First Nation located on the Sunshine Coast of British Columbia, Canada. Their swiya (world, 'Territory’) comprises 515,000 hectares that stretches from xwesam (Roberts Creek) in the southeast, to x̱enichen (Jervis Inlet) in the north, to kwekwenis (Lang Bay) in the southwest.

== Language ==
The language of the shíshálh people is she shashishalhem or Sechelt, a Coast Salish language most closely related to Squamish, Halkomelem, and Nooksack. In the 1970s, nation elders began efforts to revive the she shashishalhem language. The band collaborated with University of British Columbia linguist Ron Beaumont to create a Sechelt Dictionary.

== Culture ==
=== tems swiya Museum ===
The tems swiya Museum is a cultural heritage museum owned and operated by the shíshálh Nation and located within their administrative complex in ch’atlich (Sechelt), British Columbia.

== History ==
Historically, there were four main shíshálh settlements at ḵalpilin (Pender Harbour), ts’unay (Deserted Bay), x̱enichen, and tewankw near alhtulich (Porpoise Bay).

As the Europeans arrived in the region, the shíshálh people experienced numerous changes. Disease (especially smallpox) became rampant, and resulted in a severe decrease of the shíshálh population at their various ancestral settlements.

== Governance ==
=== Chief & Council ===
shíshálh Nation is governed by an elected Chief and Council. In she shashishalhem, the word for "chief" is hiwus, and the word for councilor is hihewus. The Nation holds an election every three years.

=== Self-Government Act ===
In 1986, shíshálh Nation became the first indigenous government in Canada to regain self-government under the shíshálh Nation Self-Government Act (formerly known as the Sechelt Indian Self-Government Act). The Act established the shíshálh Nation Government District (sNGD), a First Nations government district comprising 33 former "Indian Reserve" parcels, now known as 'shíshálh Nation Lands' or 'SNL'. The Act further enabled the sNGD to qualify for municipal benefits available to other municipalities in BC, such as to enact laws, bylaws, and taxes.

=== BC Treaty Process ===
shíshálh Nation entered into negotiations independently with Canada and British Columbia under the BC Treaty Process in 1994, and reached Stage 3, Negotiation of a Framework Agreement, by August, 1995. Negotiations stalled thereafter in Stage 4 and the Nation is listed as "Not Currently Negotiating" by the BC Treaty Commission.

=== shíshálh-B.C. Foundation Agreement ===
On October 4, 2018, shíshálh Nation and the Province of British Columbia signed a landmark reconciliation agreement that supports self-determination and shíshálh self-government. The agreement is a commitment to working together to protect the environment, as well as promote economic opportunity and growth for the shíshálh Nation and the entire Sechelt region.

The agreement included the transfer of lands, as well as commitment to a framework of shared decision-making for forestry, moorages, and other land and resource authorizations within the shíshálh swiya.

== Demographics ==
- Number of Band Members: 1,237

== See also ==
- shíshálh Language
- shíshálh Nation Government District

== Members ==
Pat John (1953–2022), actor in The Beachcombers
