= Sechelt language =

Coast Salish language in British Columbia

Sechelt
- sháshíshalh-em
- Pronunciation: /ʃaʃiʃaɬəm/
- Native to: Canada
- Region: British Columbia
- Ethnicity: 1,200 Sechelt people (shíshálh) (2014)
- Native speakers: 1 (2019)
- Language family: Salishan: Coast Salish; Central; Sechelt

Language codes
- ISO 639-3: sec
- Glottolog: sech1246
- ELP: She shashishalhem (Sechelt)
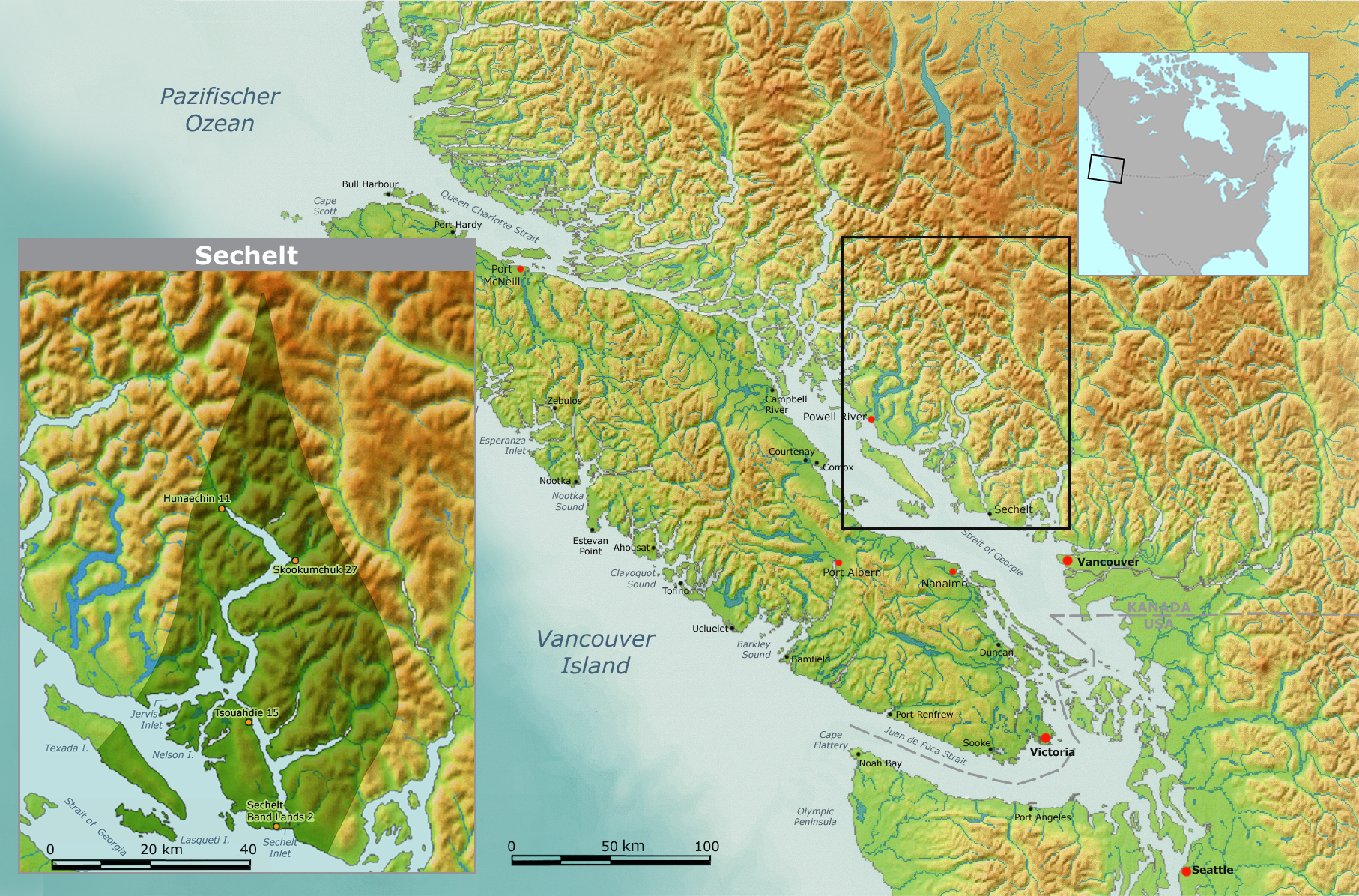
- The historical extent of Sechelt territory (swiya)

- Sechelt is classified as Critically Endangered by the UNESCO Atlas of the World's Languages in Danger.

- People: shíshálh
- Language: sháshíshálh-em
- Country: shíshálh swíya

Sechelt (/ˈsiːʃɛlt/; also called she shashishalhem; Sechelt: sháshíshalh-em, IPA: [ʃaʃiʃaɬəm]) is a Coast Salish language spoken by the Sechelt (shíshálh) people of the shíshálh Nation in British Columbia. Originally spoken across the lands (swiya) of the Sechelt people, the language today is nearly extinct; as of 2019 Margaret Joe Dixon was the last native speaker. Sechelt continues to be taught in local elementary schools and in higher education, including Capilano University.

Sechelt is most closely related to the Squamish, Halkomelem, and Nooksack languages.

== History ==
=== Modern era ===
In 1999, the language was spoken by fewer than forty elderly people. A grammar guide for the language was published by linguist Ron Beaumont in 1985, based on the Sechelt language course he helped design for local high schools participating in the Native Environmental Studies Program. In 2011, he further published a one thousand-page dictionary.

In 2014, the Coastal Corridor Consortium, "an entity made up of board members from First Nations and educational partners to improve aboriginal access to and performance in postsecondary education and training", created a Sechelt Nation language certificate that is offered at Capilano University Sunshine Coast Campus in Sechelt.

In January 2019, after the death of Yvonne Joe kekshiwa and Anne Quinn sempatkwa, sonee, only one elderly fluent speaker, Margaret Joe Dixon, remained. Many teachers are working with children and adults to revitalize the language in local schools, from preschool to post-secondary. Both University of British Columbia and Capilano University offer Sechelt language courses, along with Kinnikinnick Elementary School and Chatelech Secondary School.

== Phonology ==
=== Consonants ===
For those IPA symbols that do not match their orthographic counterparts, the orthographic representation is in brackets. This is based on the alphabet created by Randy Bouchard in 1977.

		Bilabial	Alveolar			Palatal	Velar		Uvular		Glottal
		Bilabial	median	sibilant	lateral	Palatal	plain	rounded	plain	rounded	Glottal
Plosive/ Affricate	voiceless	p	t	ts		tʃ ⟨ch⟩	k	kʷ	q ⟨ḵ⟩	qʷ ⟨ḵw⟩	ʔ
Plosive/ Affricate	ejective	pʼ	tʼ	tsʼ	tɬʼ ⟨tl⟩	tʃʼ ⟨ch'⟩	kʼ	kʷʼ	qʼ ⟨ḵ'⟩	qʷʼ ⟨ḵw'⟩	ʔ
Fricative				s	ɬ ⟨lh⟩	ʃ ⟨sh⟩	x	xʷ	χ ⟨x̱⟩	χʷ ⟨x̱w⟩	h
Sonorant		m	n		l	j ⟨y⟩		w			

=== Vowels ===
	Front	Central	Back
Close	i		
Mid		ə	o
Open		a	

The four vowels have numerous allophones when in certain phonetic contexts.

When the /i/ is between voiced back consonants and /ʔ/ it is realized as [e], while when it is between two other consonants it is realized as [i]. If it is between a combination of the two groups it is realized as a vowel in between [i] and [e], usually closer to [e]. The vowel is also realized as [e] when the syllable is unstressed.

The /ə/ is realized as [ɪ] when after ⟨y, ch, ch', sh, k, k'⟩. After consonants with lip rounding it is realized as [ʊ], and after ⟨h, k, ḵ', m, p', t', tl', x̱, ʔ⟩ it is realized as [ʌ]. When /ə/ is in an unstressed syllable between two voiceless consonants it is also voiceless.

The /o/ is realized as a [u] when preceded or followed by a consonant with lip rounding.

The /a/ is realized as [ɒ] when preceded by a consonant with lip rounding and realized as [æ] after the consonants ⟨y, ch, ch', sh, k, k'⟩.

The vowels may also be subject for lengthening, but this is purely for rhetorical purposes. The longer a vowel is held, the more emphatic or dramatic the intended meaning is.

=== Stress and syllable structure ===
All Sechelt words have at least one stressed syllable, but some words have stress on every syllable. This gives the language its characteristic "choppy" cadence.

In Sechelt, no word can start with a vowel. The glottal stop is used at the beginning of words that would otherwise start with vowels. Further, there can never be two vowel sounds in a row. The glottal stop is often inserted between the two consecutive vowels, such as at the end of a word root and beginning of a suffix. Another solution for consecutive vowels is to omit whichever vowel is unstressed.

== Alphabet ==
a ch chʼ e h i k kʼ kw kwʼ ḵ ḵʼ ḵw ḵwʼ l lh m n p pʼ s sh t tʼ tlʼ ts tsʼ u w x xw x̱ x̱w y ˀ ʔ

== Morphology ==
Like other members of the Salish language family, Sechelt is agglutinative with affixes added to nouns and verbs.

For verbs, suffixes are added to mark the subject and tense, as well as to make the statement a question or add adverbial information. All pronouns in Sechelt are suffixes, while adverbs may be suffixes or their own word that comes before the verb and can take on suffixes of its own. This can be exemplified by two different wordings of the question "Were you afraid?", with the first one emphasizing the word "afraid" and the second emphasizing that it happened in the past.

ch’ásxém -ulh -á -chexw?
afraid -COMPL -Q -you?
'Were you afraid?'

ku -á -chexw ch’asxém?
PST -Q -you afraid?
'Were you afraid?'

For nouns and verbs, lexical markers are used to convey related meanings. This can be seen in variations on the verb ts'exw 'get clean/washed':

ts'exw -ál-its'á
get.clean/washed -clothes
'wash clothes; laundry, washing'

ts'ixwálits'á -ten
laundry -device/container
washing machine; washtub'

ts'exw -am -ten
get.clean dish -device/container
'dishpan, sink'

ts'exw -áwtxw
get.clean -room
'bathroom; washroom'

For nouns, possessive markers can be separate words, suffixes, or be both prefixes and suffixes. Forms may differ due to the object's gender and whether it is visible or invisible.

nelh ten sila.
It my grandfather.
'It's my grandfather'

nelh-a tl'ems-tan-s lhems sila?
That-Q house-her our grandma
'Is that our grandmother's house?'

nelh-a ?e s-ch'enu-elap?
it-Q your dog-your?
'Is this your dog?'

=== Infixes ===
Commonly in Sechelt, there is no suffix on the verb to convey that the subject is third person singular or plural. However, if the speaker would like to emphasize that the subject is plural they may add -áw- or -íw- as an infix in the middle of the verb or -aw after the verb.

‘é’ílhten
he/she is eating

‘é’ílh-⟨íw⟩-ten
they are eating

== Syntax ==
=== Word order ===
Sechelt has a Verb-Subject-Object word order, with only select adverbs that are able to go before the verb in a sentence. There is no case marking in the language and a noun's role in the sentence is determined by word order.

While there are both transitive and intransitive verbs in Sechelt, transitive forms are often derived from intransitive forms and have a different ending. For example, the word "kánám" means "to listen" while the word "kánám-mít" means "to listen to/hear." You can see this below in this sentence that illustrates the word order.

kánám-mít -chen che xwch’énam wéwúm
hear(trans) I the dogs barking
'I hear the dogs barking'

kánám -á -chexw
listen(intrans) question-mkr you
'Are you listening?'

While there is no conjugation in Sechelt, nouns can be differentiated based on gender (male or female) and whether the object is visible. This only affects articles and possessive pronouns.

== See also ==
- Shíshálh Nation
- Sechelt, British Columbia
